= History of Tufts University =

The history of Tufts University, originally Tufts College, can be traced back to 1847 when the Universalist Church set up convention for the creation of a university for the parish. In 1858, the college was established when Boston businessman Charles Tufts donated 20 acres of land to the church to establish the college. It is the third oldest college that was founded in the Boston area. During the 19th century the college grew. The official college seal, bearing the motto Pax et Lux (Peace and Light) was adopted in 1857. The school colors of brown and blue were selected in 1876. Tufts' mascot became Jumbo when P.T. Barnum gave a natural history museum to the university.

During the late 19th and early 20th century, the college grew and expanded to becoming a national university offering masters and PhD programs with the establishment of a medical school in 1899, an engineering school in 1898, a dental school in 1899, and the Fletcher School of Law and Diplomacy in 1933. In 1954, Tufts College became Tufts University. During the 1970s, French American nutritionist Jean Mayer became president and through a series of acquisitions, increased the endowment six-fold and expanded the university. During the 1990s and 2000s, Tufts continued to observe growth with the merger with the School of the Museum of Fine Arts and the establishment of the Allen Discovery Centers.

== Foundation ==
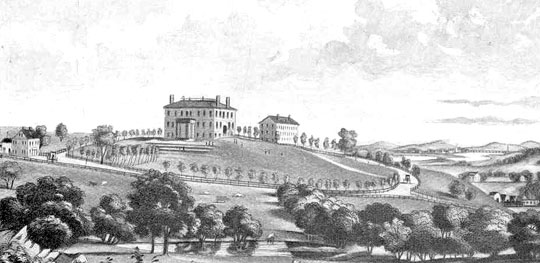
Tufts College, c. 1854

In the 1840s, the Universalist church wanted to open a college in New England due to the majority of members being barred from expensive colleges. In the spring of 1847, Rev. Thomas J. Sawyer of New York opened a correspondence with Rev. Hosea Ballou of Medford and Rev. Thomas Whittemore of Cambridgeport who was also the editor of Trumpet and Universalist Magazine. On April 17, 1847, Sawyer issued a circular in the "Trumpet" and called for an "educational convention" to meet on Orchard Street in New York City on May 18. The meeting was opened by Ballou and presented the arguments for a college for the Universalists. After it was agreed upon, the selection of a site was left to a board which was elected later in that meeting. The first board of trustees had five members. Ballou announced that $100,000 needed to be raised prior to the commencement of any operations. Seeing no other alternative, the board reconvened on September 14, and a business committee was established. Later on April 21, 1851, a committee on location was established and reported two favorable offers, a tract of 20 acres on a portion of the farm of Charles Tufts and a patch of land in 25 miles away in the town of Franklin. After several weeks, the trustees chose the Medford site, the site in Franklin would later be developed as a preparatory school for the new college.

== Early years (1852–1904) ==
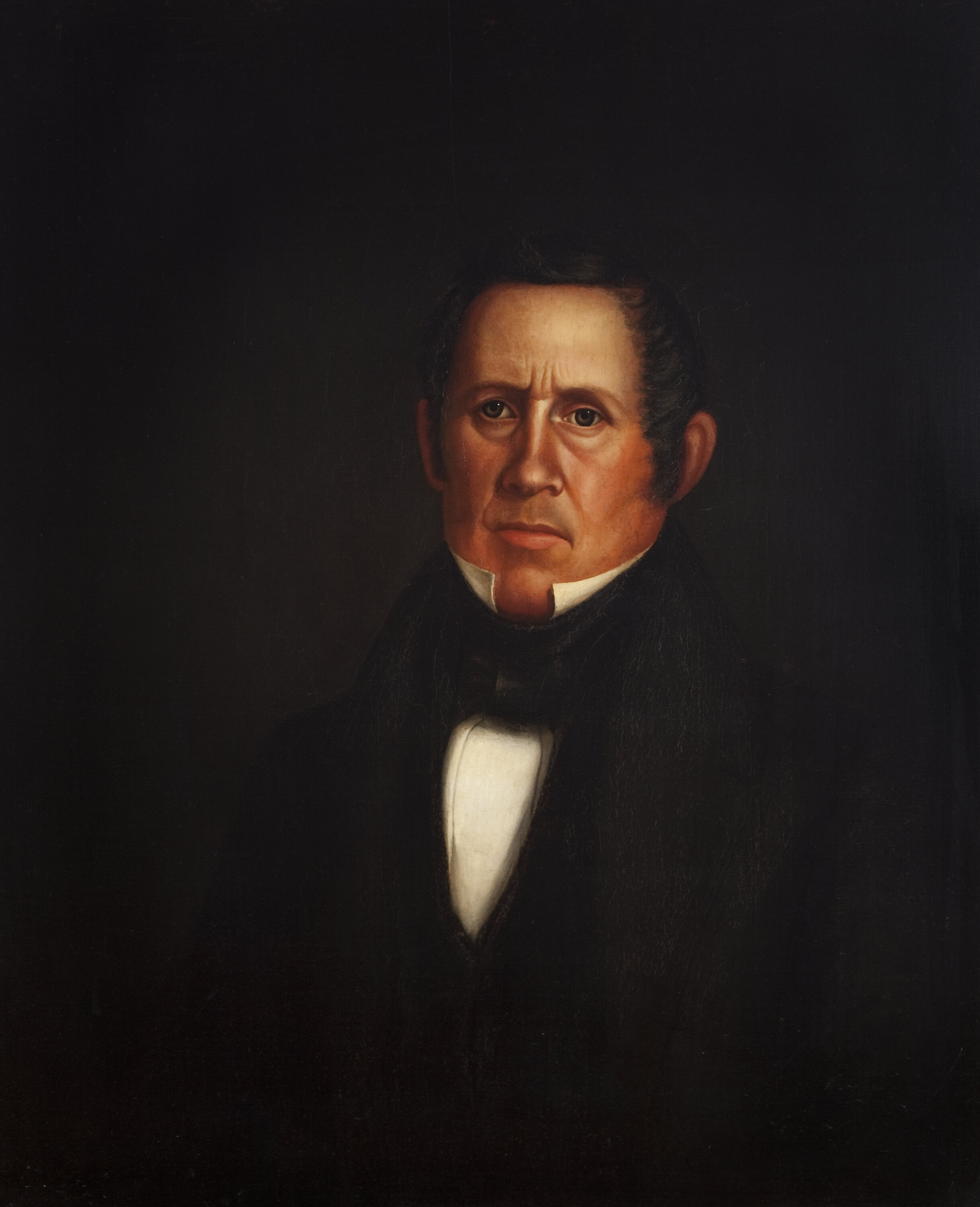
Charles Tufts, Tufts' namesake

Charles Tufts had inherited the land, a barren hill which was one of the highest points in the Boston area, called Walnut Hill, and when asked by a family member what he intended to do with the land, he said "I will put a light on it." His 20-acre donation (then valued at $20,000) is still at the heart of Tufts' now 150 acre campus, straddling Somerville and Medford. His gift was accompanied by another 20 acres from Timothy Cotting. Additionally Sylvanus Packard also contributed to the college by bequeathing his entire of estate worth about $300,000 to the college upon his death in 1866. It was also in 1852 that the Commonwealth of Massachusetts chartered Tufts College, noting the college should promote "virtue and piety and learning in such of the languages and liberal and useful arts as shall be recommended." Building operations commenced and on July 23, 1853, the corner-stone of the first college building was laid by Ballou. The building was designed to be rectangular, one hundred feet by sixty feet. With three finished storied built in an Italianate style with red brick and sandstone trimmings. Architect Gridley James Fox Bryant was hired for the design. In addition to recitation rooms, the building contained dormitories, bathing accommodations, a chapel, library, and two common rooms. During construction, Ballou spent a year travelling and studying in the United Kingdom. The methods of instruction which he initiated were based on the tutorials that were conducted in the University of Oxford and the University of Edinburgh.

On August 18, 1855, the last examination for admission was held and the opening of the college was announced on the August 22. In February 1855, an association was formed whose main job was to raise funds for the college. It consisted of parishes, auxiliary, and religious societies, and was known as the "Tufts College Educational Association." The first matriculation exercise occurred from 9:00-11:00 in the morning on August 16, 1855. Opening prayers and four toasts were made with the total amount subscribed at the dinner to be $4,000.

Under President Ballou, 21 students entered the Freshman class including four who had been studying there the previous years. Additionally, there were three Sophomores, three juniors, for a total of 30 students. The Class of 1856 had 15 students but by 1859 it had risen to 50. The first commencement exercises occurred on July 8, 1857, with three students receiving their degrees. The requirements for admission were the same as Harvard but most of the young men came from the country and had poor preparation, thus they were admitted under heavy conditions. During the six years of Ballou's tenure 108 students were registered.

After Ballou died in 1861, he was succeeded by Alonzo Ames Miner. Though not a college graduate, his presidency was marked by several advances. The first major donation to the college came from the parish at $16,000. Later on Dr. William Walker donated $200,000. In 1863 a gift of $50,000 was provided by the State for the creation of three scholarships each $50. When the tuition was raised from the original $35 to $50 the scholarships were increased to $100. Several other scholarships were during the 1860s. The establishment of preparatory schools for Tufts which include Goddard Seminary, Westbrook Seminary, and Dean Academy also occurred.

During the Civil War the college actively supported the Union cause. The mansion of Major George L. Stearns which stood on part of the campus was a station on the Underground Railroad. In addition to having the largest classes spring up, 63 graduates served in the Union army.

Miner's successor, Elmer Capen of the Class of 1860 was the first president to be a Tufts alumnus. During his time, one of the earliest innovators, Amos Dolbear became chair of the physics department in 1875. He installed a working telephone which connected his lab in Ballou Hall to his home on Professors Row. Two years later Alexander Graham Bell would receive the patent. Dolbear's work at Tufts was later continued by Marconi and Tesla. Other famous scholars included William Leslie Hooper who in addition to serving as acting president, designed the first slotted armature for dynamos. His student at the college, Frederick Stark Pearson would eventually become one of America's pioneers of the electrical power industry. He became responsible for the development of the electric power and electric street car systems which many cities in South America and Europe used. Another notable figure was Stephen M. Babcock who developed the first practical test to determine the amount of butterfat in milk. Since its development in the college, the Babcock Test has hardly been modified. Expansion of the chemistry and biology departments were largely led by scholars Arthur Michael, who was one of the first organic chemists in the U.S., and John Sterling Kingsley who was one of the first scholars of comparative anatomy. Charles Sumner Wilson (1853–1904), who in 1870 became the first Black student nominated to West Point, was one of the first known students of African descent at the College, where he studied for two years.

=== Curriculum ===
The first curriculum offered one course which led to a Bachelor of Arts degree with most of the work being prescribed. Half of the work was required to be in Greek and Latin. Instruction in Mathematics was required for two years, History for three, and Rhetoric for four. Work in modern languages was considered an elective and with work in Moral Science, Physical Science, Natural and Revealed Religion finishing the prescribed studies. Few changes were made to the curriculum during Ballou's tenure. Changes included reducing the Mathematics requirements and the expansion of modern language instruction.

The curriculum was expanded with the creation of the Philosophical Course aimed at helping students in the Classics. The first course of a three-year program leading to a degree in civil engineering was established in 1865, the same year MIT was founded. Thomas Willis Pratt who would later develop the Pratt Truss was the primary instructor. He was assisted by Dr. Charles Bray. In 1869, the Crane Theological School was organized.

Under Capen's direction, larger opportunities for elective work began. The required work in Latin, Greek and Mathematics was confined to a year and a half. In 1875, the Philosophical course was extended to cover the four years. The Faculty of Letters doubled eventually from 11 to 26 instructors by 1895. In 1890, elementary French and German was made a requisite for admission and in 1891 a Modern Language course was established. Modern Languages were eventually required for advanced work in the Philosophical Course. On July 15, 1892, the Tufts Board of Trustees voted to become coeducational, such that "that the College be opened to women in the undergraduate departments on the same terms and conditions as men." The trustees also voted to create a graduate school faculty and to offer the Ph.D. degree in biology and chemistry. In 1893 the Medical School opened and in 1899 the Boston Dental College was integrated into the university. In 1897, Henry Peyton Johnson became the first Black man to graduate from the medical school. In 1890, the Department of Electrical Engineering was created, and in 1892 - 1893 the course of three-year program in civil engineering was extended to four years. With the advent of the four-year program the degrees granted were bachelor of civil or electrical engineering. Tufts College added the Department of Mechanical Engineering and the Department of Chemical Engineering in 1894 and 1898, respectively. In 1898, the trustees voted to formally establish an undergraduate College of Engineering.

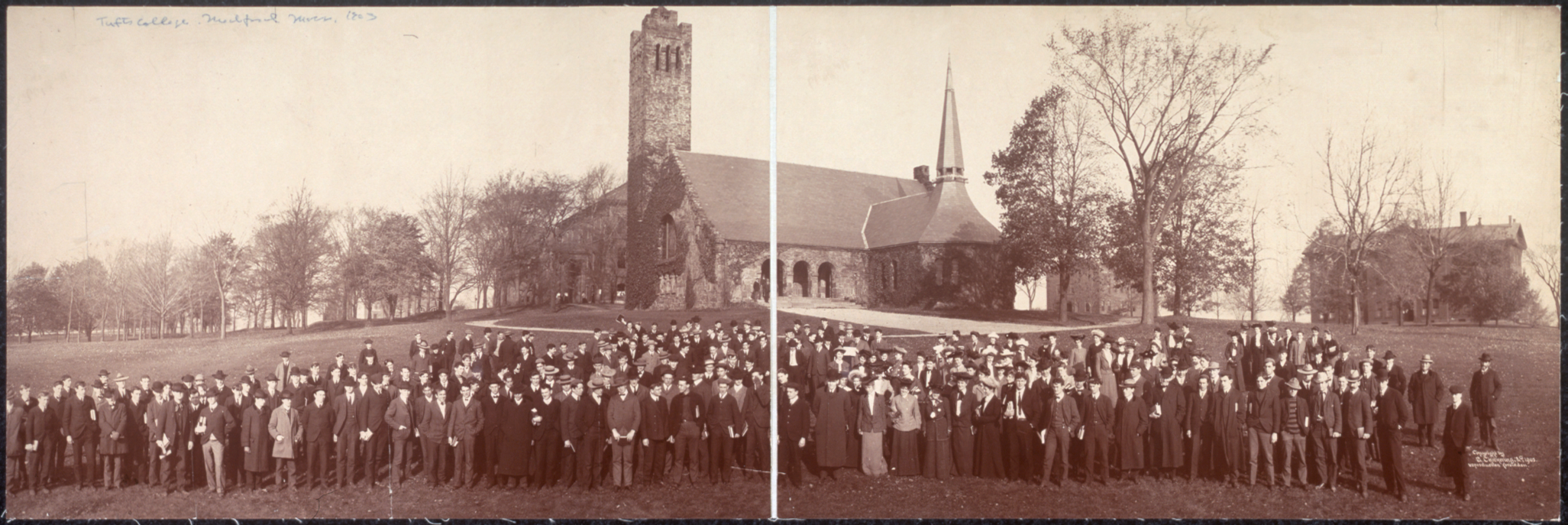
Tufts student group in 1903 with Goddard Chapel in the background

=== Development and expansion ===
After the completion of College Hall, in 1856, a brick building, known as Building A, was constructed for $9,715. Arranged for a boarding house and dormitory, it accommodated 26 students. In 1857 a two-story wooden dormitory accommodating 12 students was built on the site of what is now West Hall and in 1860 a large 4-story dormitory, now known as East Hall, was erected.

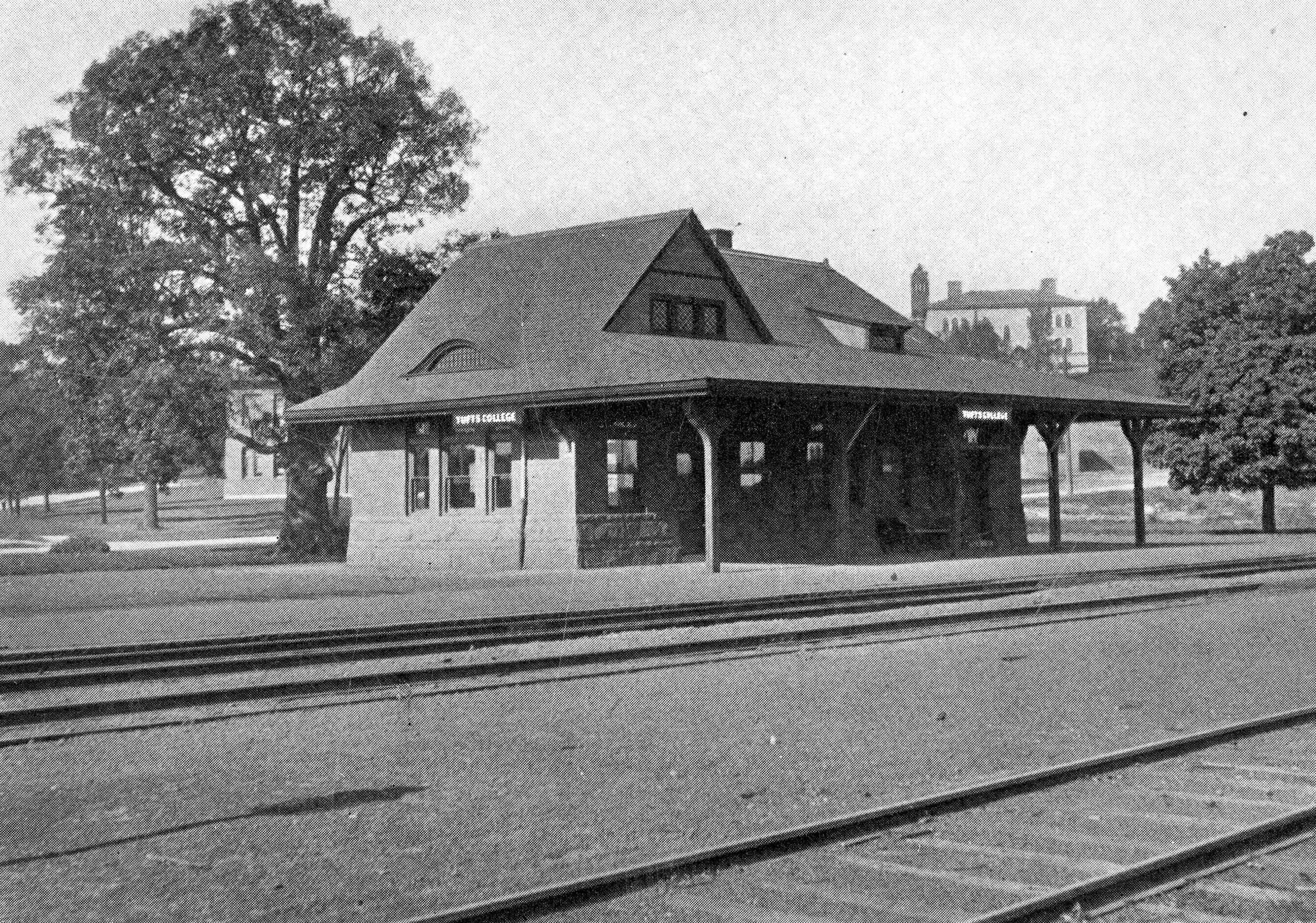
Tufts College Avenue Station in 1907

During the first decade, the college had been isolated but in 1861, what is now College Avenue, was laid out to connect the campus with Somerville and Medford. In 1866, Professors Row and Packard Avenue were laid out. A large reservoir was also constructed that year, adjacent to the main campus. The reservoir itself part of the Boston water supply system, provided drinking water to the communities of Somerville, Charlestown, and Chelsea. West Hall, a dormitory designed to accompany East Hall was planned in 1869, with construction completed in 1872. The end of Miner's tenure was also marked by the growth of the library which by then contained 4,000 volumes. During Capen's tenure the library could no longer be accommodated in College Hall, so a stack was accommodated in a small building between East and West Halls known as Middle Hall.

On March 29, 1892, Goddard Chapel was dedicated. It was given by Mrs. Mary T. Goddard in memory of her husband Thomas A. Goddard, who established one of the first scholarship programs. The architect was J. Philip Rinn. Goddard also gave a gymnasium, completed on what is now Ginn Library.

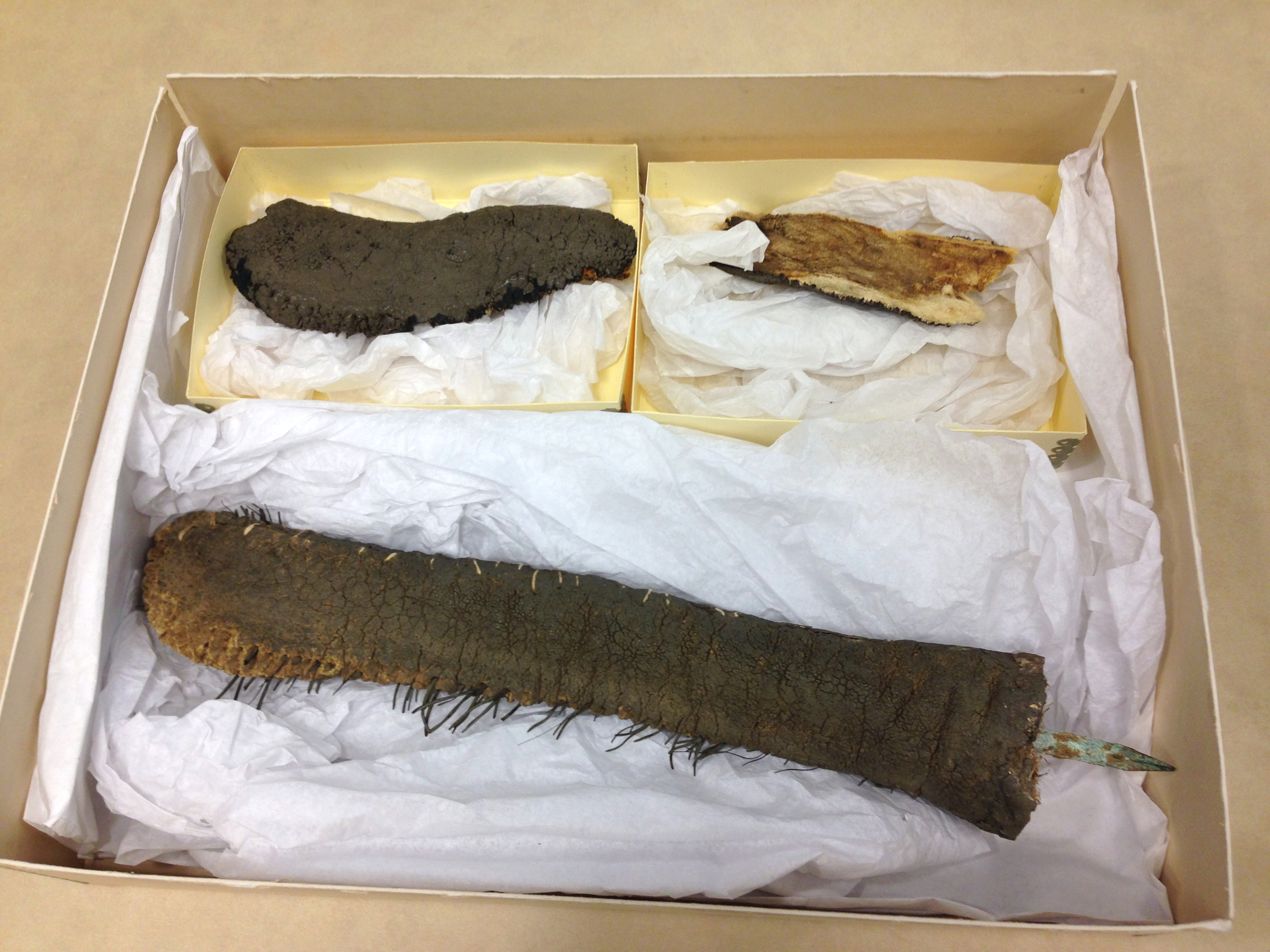
Surviving fragments of Jumbo from the conflagration

P. T. Barnum, one of the earliest benefactors of Tufts College, gave $55,000 in 1882 for the creation of the Barnum Museum of Natural History (Barnum Hall). Completed in 1884 with an additional donation of $40,000, the building housed his collection of animal specimens and the stuffed hide of Jumbo the elephant, who would become the university's mascot. The museum also incorporated an earlier collection of rocks and minerals which was established in the first decade of the college's existence. The museum stood until April 14, 1975, when fire gutted Barnum Hall, destroying the entire collection.

Several new dormitories opened during the late 19th century. Dean Hall was erected next to the gymnasium in 1886. Miner and Paige Halls were built to house students in the Theological School. Metcalf Hall opened in 1893 and served as the dormitory for women after Jackson College was founded. The Commons Building, now known as Curtis Hall was built in 1893 and incorporated the first dining hall for the college. Bromfield-Pearson was erected in 1894 to provide a course for preparatory engineering instruction. In 1898 Robinson Hall was constructed to house newly created College of Engineering.

The Boston and Lowell Railroad opened its namesake line in 1835, though local stops were not added immediately. By 1889, the College Hill station was located on the north side of the tracks just west of College Avenue. By 1900, College Hill was replaced with Tufts College station, located on the opposite side of the tracks and slightly to the south at Pearson Street.

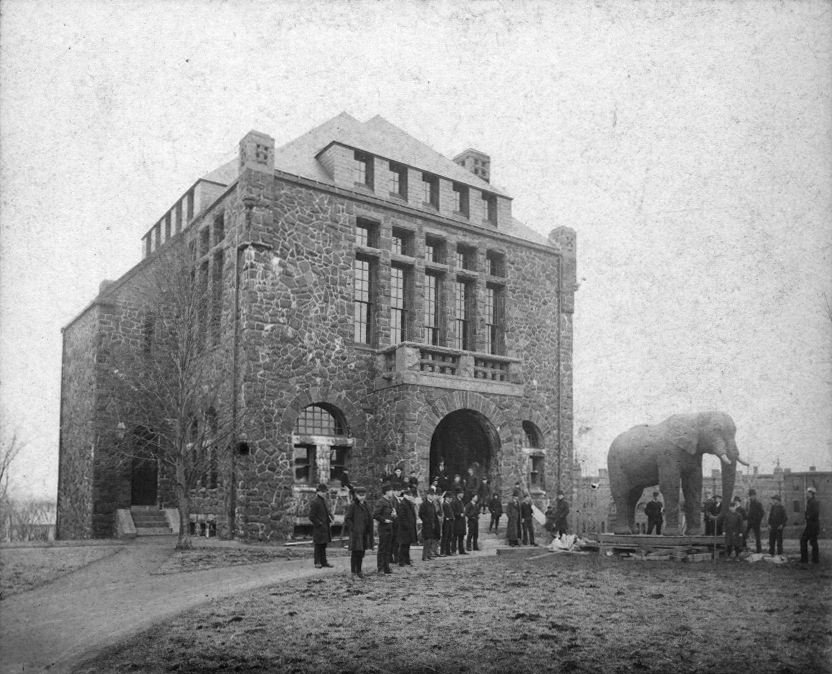
Moving Jumbo into the Barnum Museum in 1889

=== Student activities ===
The first society formed among the students was the Mathetican, a literary group. The organization, occupied the northeast corner of College Hall. The program of its meetings consisted of debates, essays and orations and for several years it was an important part of life in the college. In 1860 members who were dissatisfied with the affairs of the Mathetican began a rival society known as the Walnut Hill Fraternity. The northwest corner of College Hall was given to them. Later a Theological Society was established and its membership was made up of students who wanted to join the ministry. In 1855, the Kappa chapters of both Zeta Psi and Theta Delta Chi entered the college.

After the establishment of the Theological School, the Mathetican saw another rival, the Zetagathean. In 1864 the Order of the Round Table was established as a rival to an earlier society known as the Order of the Coffee Pot. These two were short lived however and both died out by 1868. An economic organization was founded in 1872, known as the Tufts Laundry Association. A Glee Club was founded in 1866 but died out in 1874. In 1873 several smaller organizations were created such as the Chess Club, the Amateur Dispatch Company, and the Reading-room Association. In 1864, the first college publications were issued. The Tuftonian became the first. Originally a pamphlet of four pages, it was enlarged to 32 pages by 1872. In 1874 the Tufts College Publishing Association was established. Its first publication ran under the name the "Collegian."

=== Athletics ===
Baseball was introduced in 1863, followed by football ten years later. Two boat clubs were established and in the spring of 1865, the Theta Delta Chi fraternity provided members with a boathouse on the Mystic River. The Tufts Athletic Association was founded in November 1874, with the first competitions held on November 4. The first events were a mile walk, a mile run, a 100-yard dash, a wheelbarrow race, sack race, and a three-legged race. These were held on the reservoir with later activities being held on the grounds of what is now Fletcher Field.

== Continued expansion (1904–1945) ==
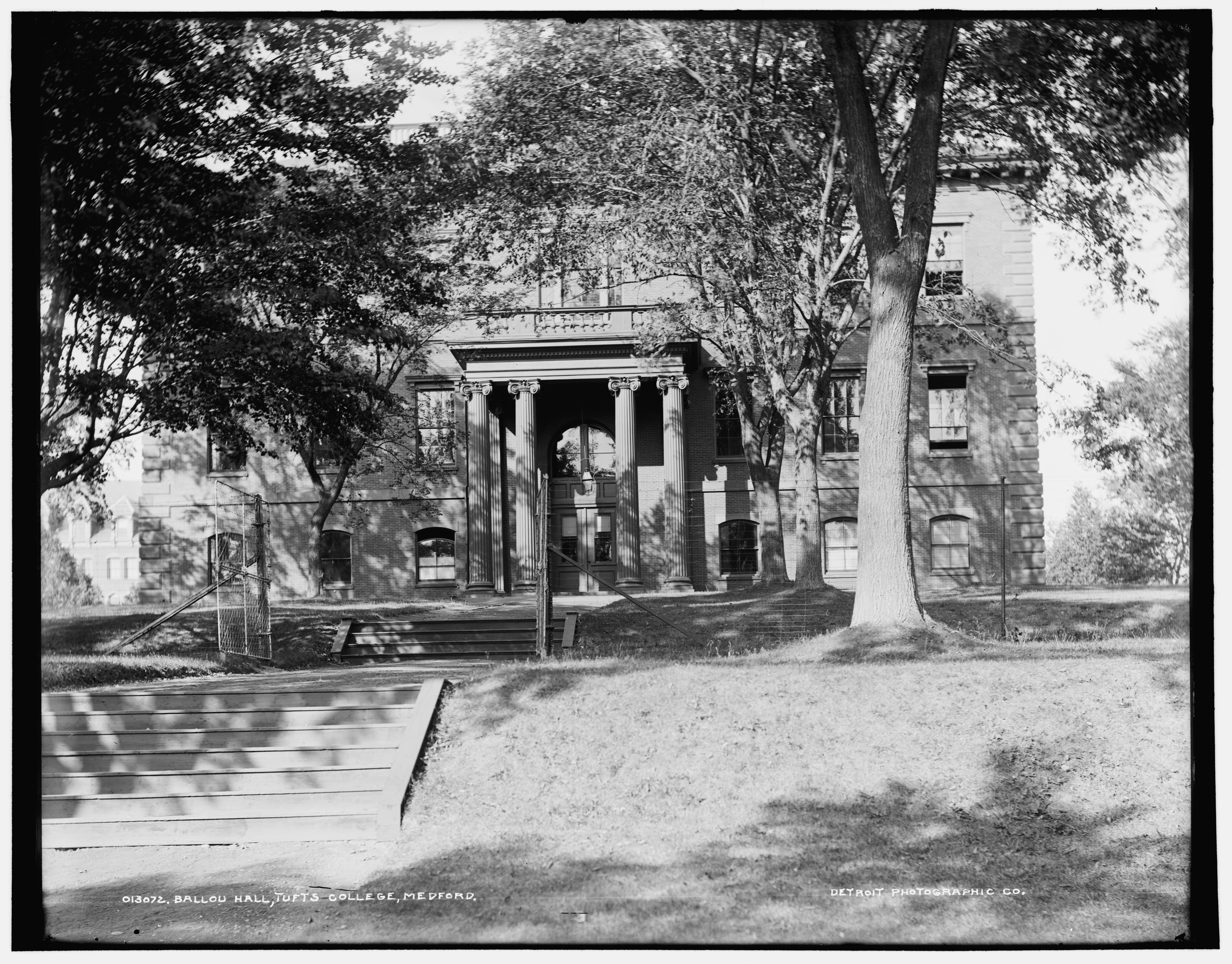
Ballou Hall 1905

In 1905, President Capen died. A committee of 7 Trustees appointed the Chairman of the Executive Committee Frederick W. Hamilton as acting president. Under Capen, the library collection which had been distributed between College (Ballou) Hall and Middle (Packard) Hall was given its own building. A gift from Andrew Carnegie, gave Tufts a new library at a cost of $100,000. The building was designed by the New York firm of Whitfield & King and is one of the firms best known works. The edifice was centrally located on top of the hill, with red brick walls, stone steps and elaborate marble columns and ornamentation in the neo-classical style. The stack area was designed for 200,000 books however shelving was not completed until 1938. The cost of equipping the library cost over $11,000. Mrs. Carnegie decided that rather than having the library share Carnegie name, the building would be a memorial to Rev. Charles H. Eaton who had presided over her wedding.

The Jackson College for Women was fully established in 1910 as a coordinate college on the Tufts campus. In 1980 it was integrated with the College of Liberal Arts but was still recognized in the formal name of the undergraduate arts and sciences division, the College of Liberal Arts and Jackson College. Undergraduate women in arts and sciences continued to receive their diplomas from Jackson College until 2002.

Forrester Blanchard Washington became the first known Black graduate of the University in 1909. Jesse Gideon Garnett became the first Black woman to earn a medical degree from the School of Dental Medicine.

=== Great Depression ===
After Bumpus, came President Cousens who observed expansion of the university during the Great Depression. The effects were not as great as some feared. Despite the fact that lower than expected enrollment occurred, the entering classes during the 1930s were the largest in the history of the college. The noticeable difference was the higher portion of students who lived at home rather than on the Hill. While it meant loss of revenue, it also meant enrolling more students. In 1933, seven regional prize scholarships were established to encourage qualified students to enter. Six additional competitive scholarships cover tuition were created by the trustees in 1935 and became known as "New England Scholarships".

Fundraising became the primary project during the decade. A project which had started when Cousens was elected in 1919. Cousens set the ideal target of $2 million for the endowment, but the goal had to be lowered to $1 million due to limited income from donors. Cousens proposed to organize the college into three sections. The first section would lead students to earning an Associate in Arts degree. After completing the AA degree, students would go to the second section to earn a bachelor's degree. The third section would provide students with at most two years in professional training. He suggested that in addition to the medical, dental, engineering, and religious schools, that schools in law, business, and education would be established.

Cousens set up a master plan with the firm of Andrews, Jones, Biscoe, and Whitmore. He first set out to enclose as well as beautify the campus. Two main gates would be set up. The Gager Gate dedicated in 1921 was placed in front of Campus Drive across from the reservoir. The gate was donated by Harold Gager. In 1963, the gate was removed due to extensive construction and because its narrow aperture no longer sufficed for conveyances which had to enter the campus. In 1924, Eugene Bowen provided another gate for the western part of campus. After the Bowen Gate, sections were contributed by the Class of 1899 and numerous other classes beginning with the Class of 1924. In 1926, the Trustees voted to construct ten sections of the campus fence to represent the Classes of 1857 through 1866. The eastern sections of the campus gates were completed in 1926, with the Starkweather Gate, the Hodgdon Gate, and the Memorial Gate accompanied with a large staircase that led to the upper campus from College Avenue. Cousens would commission the Olmsted Brothers to design the staircase and the landscaping of the Hill, referring to the campus as a garden.

In 1932, the firm of Andrews, Jones, Biscoe, and Whitmore prepared for a long-range plan for the Hill. They suggested that the headquarters of the new Fletcher School of Law and Diplomacy be built across from Ballou Hall. This building would have a new portico on the north side to match Ballou's portico. At the foot of the hill, the firm suggested a monumental building across from the Memorial Steps. It was to include an assembly hall, theater, and student union. In order to encourage students to stay on campus, the plan also included new housing on what is today Fletcher Field. From the master plan only four buildings came into existence, Gifford House, Braker Hall, Blakeley Hall, and Stratton Hall.

=== Fletcher School of Law and Diplomacy ===
In 1911, Dr. Austin Barclay Fletcher became the chair of the board of trustees. A millionaire, his death in the summer of 1923 created one of the most complex legal tangles in which the College became involved. Fletcher's will left an estimated $3,000,000 for the university with $1,000,000 going to establish a new school of law and diplomacy and the rest for new buildings and their maintenance. Under Cousens, the estimates of the amount anticipated fluctuated until by the end of 1924, a settlement was made by Fletcher's relatives. The final installment arrived in 1925 and by 1926 planning started on the creation of the new school. Professor George Grafton Wilson from Harvard Law School was appointed the first lecturer of the school.

Tufts expanded in the 1933 with the opening of the Fletcher School of Law and Diplomacy, the first graduate school of international affairs in the United States. The Fletcher School began as a joint effort between Tufts and Harvard University, funded by an endowment from longtime Tufts benefactor and alumnus Dr. Austin Barclay Fletcher. Tufts assumed full administration of the Fletcher School in 1935, and strong linkages between the two schools remain.

=== Braker School of Business Administration ===
Austin Fletcher had among his clients, Henry J. Braker, a New York real estate owner and manufacturer. He convinced Braker to visit the hill in 1905 and invest in the development of a school devoted to the fields of economics, finance, and business administration. Braker's will provided $500,000 to the college, the sum of which was known as the Henry J. Braker Fund. President Hamilton informed the Trustees that Tufts' own Braker School of Business Administration would be opened by 1910. Eventually the dean of Harvard Business School offered to help organize the school. Tufts however did not receive the funds until 1913, which also only amounted to $350,000. Bumpus who succeeded Hamilton still considered the idea with Fletcher beginning to organize the administration for the new school. Locations for the new school were also debated with from the MIT campus to across the street from the Museum of Fine Arts.

In the spring of 1920 the board of trustees voted to establish the Braker School of Business Administration with students to be admitted in September 1920. A few weeks later the name was changed to the Braker School of Commerce. Several curricula were created which was intended to overlap with the undergraduate requirements. In his mind, Fletcher intended Braker to rival the Wharton School of Finance and at one time considered opening Braker to high school graduate. Cousen's ideas about the nature and proposed school changed over the years. His original idea was to offer a combined course of 6 years in both a liberal arts and professional degree. Additional confusion occurred with how the new school would fit in with Cousen's three part plan for the curriculum. Cousens and Fletcher went back and forth for four years and in the end no step was taken to implement the Trustee vote. In 1925 the Board of Trustees used Braker's estate to establish graduate teaching fellowships to broaden course offerings in the department of economics. These also assisted in the construction of Braker Hall in 1927. The Braker Fund continued to support the economics department until the 1960s.

=== Wartime ===
During World War II, Tufts College was one of 131 colleges and universities nationally that took part in the V-12 Navy College Training Program which offered students a path to a Navy commission.

Due to travel restrictions imposed by World War II, the Boston Red Sox conducted spring training for the 1943 Major League season at Tufts College.

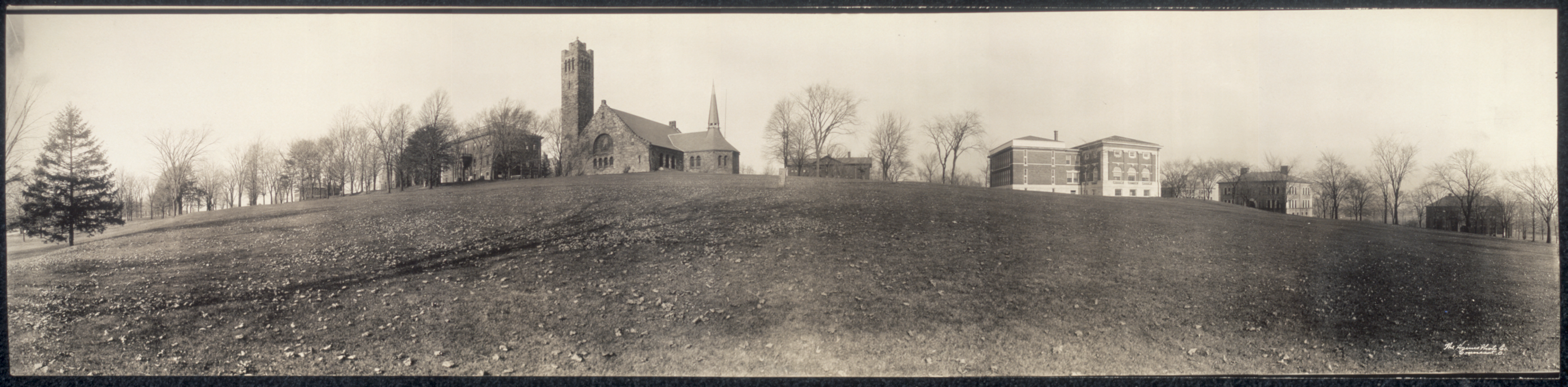
Tufts College in 1910

== Postwar expansion (1945–1999) ==
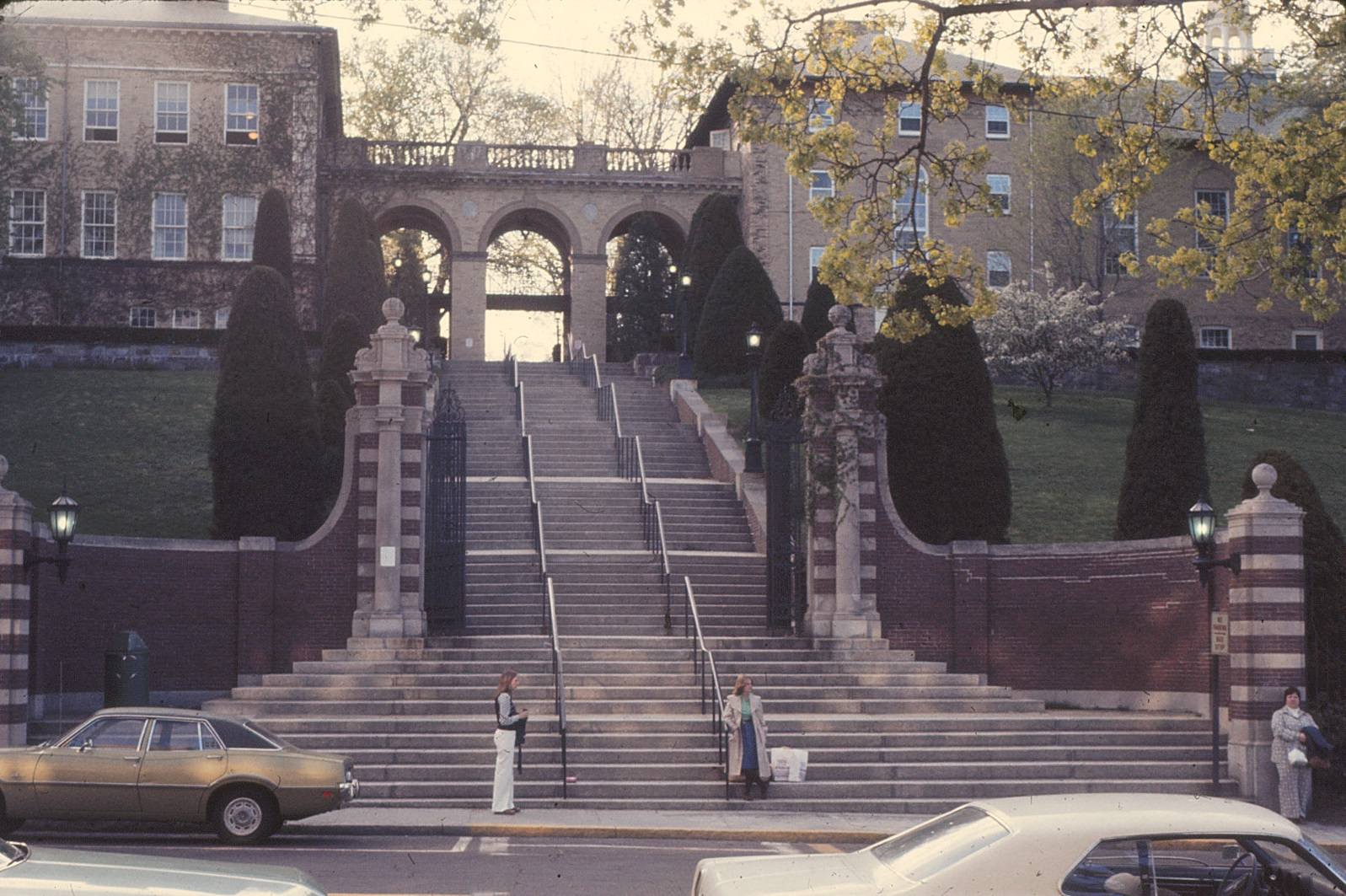
Tufts memorial steps, as seen in April 1976

In 1955, continued expansion was reflected in the change of the school's name to Tufts University.

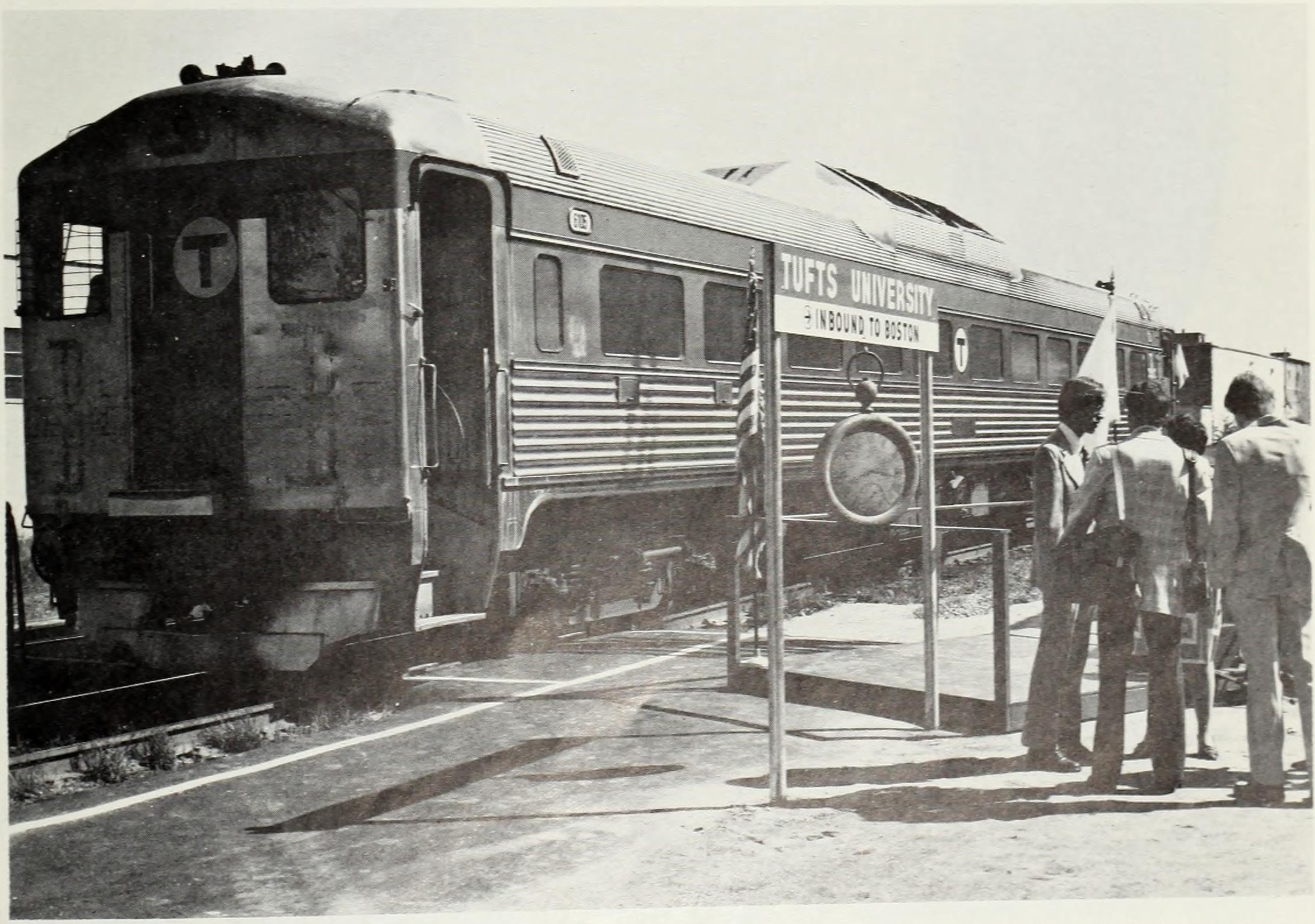
Tufts University station with a Budd RDC in September 1977

Along with the other local stops in Somerville and Medford, Tufts College station was abandoned by 1950 due to competition from streetcars and buses. In November 1976, the MBTA opened a Tufts University station near the Tufts College station site. It was abandoned in October 1979 due to poor ridership.

The College of Engineering added graduate study to its curriculum beginning in 1961, with master's degrees available in four departments. It added Ph.D. programs in mechanical engineering in 1963, electrical engineering in 1964, engineering design in 1981, and civil engineering in 1985. In 1984 CEO and chairman of Analogic Corporation and NeuroLogica Corp Bernard Marshall Gordon founded the Tufts Gordon Institute as the first educational institution created to foster entrepreneurship in the engineering fields. In 1991 the New England Association of Schools and Colleges accredited the institute to confer the degree of Master of Science in Engineering Management and in 1992 the Gordon Institute became part of the College of Engineering.

In 1999, the College of Engineering became the School of Engineering, when oversight of graduate engineering programs was transferred from the Graduate School of Arts and Sciences. As part of the same reorganization the Faculty of Arts and Science became the Faculty of Arts, Sciences, and Engineering (AS&E).

In 1965, the library collection outgrew Eaton Hall and the collection and was moved to a new building named Wessell Library. The demand for more square footage prompted the expansion of Wessell. In 1995, with the addition of 80,000 more square feet, the library was renamed Tisch Library.

== Modern era (1999–present) ==
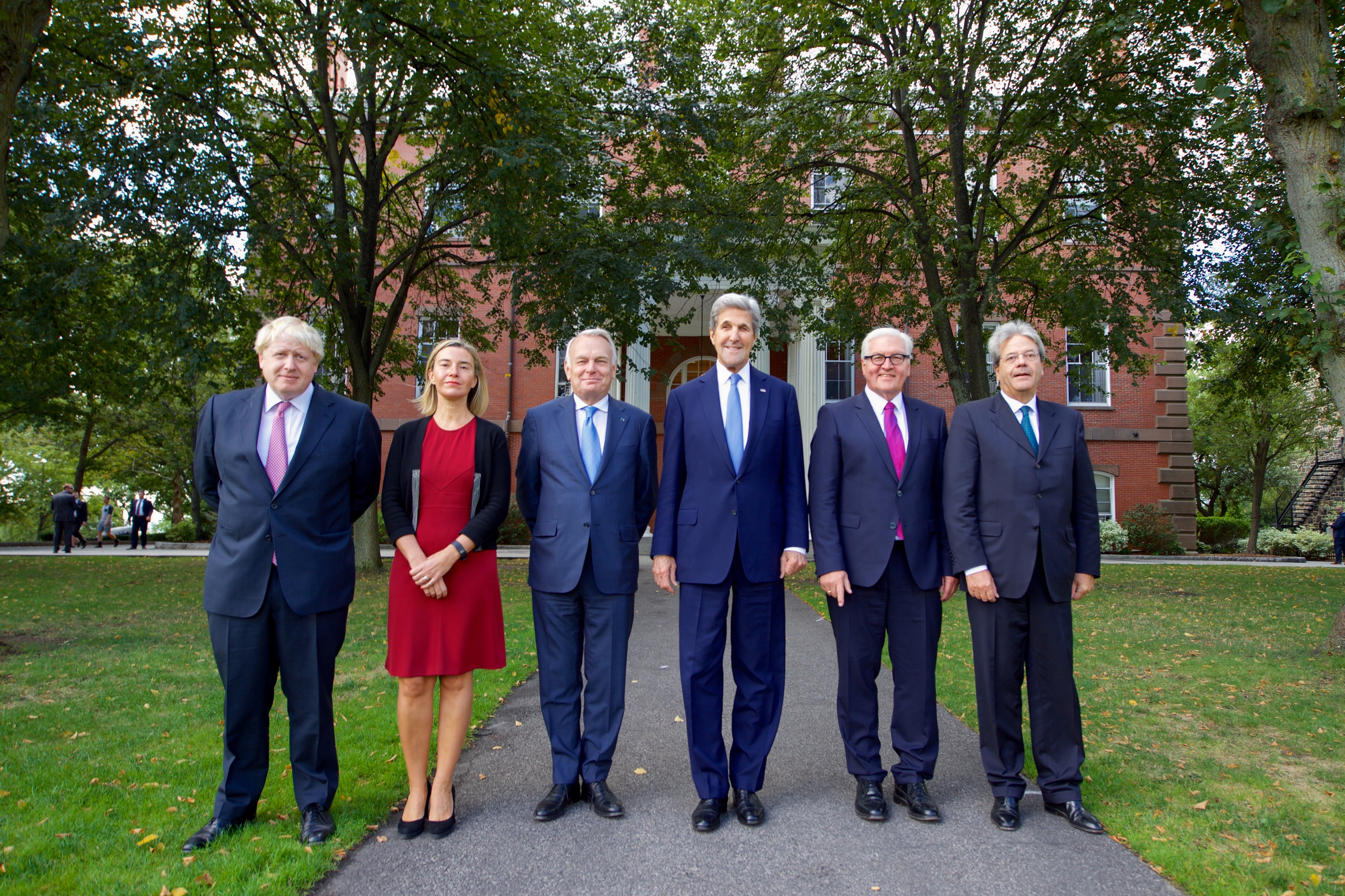
Secretary John Kerry meets with the foreign ministers of the United Kingdom, France, Italy, Germany and the European Union at the university

Under President Larry Bacow, Tufts started a capital campaign in 2006 with the goal of raising $1.2 billion to implement full need-blind admission by 2011. As of December 10, 2010 the campaign raised $1.14 billion. Tufts received the largest donations in its history since 2005, including a $136 million bequest to its endowment upon the dissolution of a charitable trust set up by 1911 alumnus Frank C. Doble, a $100 million gift from eBay founder Pierre Omidyar to establish the Omidyar-Tufts Microfinance Fund, and a number of $40 million-plus gifts to specific schools.

On November 30, 2010, the university announced that Anthony P. Monaco, formerly of Oxford, would become its thirteenth president. Monaco's inauguration took place on October 21, 2011.

As of October 15, 2015, Computer Science surpassed International Relations as the largest major at the university, with 466 declared majors.

On December 22, 2015, the university announced that it would run the School of the Museum of Fine Arts. The merger was completed on June 30, 2016.

In December 2015, the university completed a reconstruction of the Memorial Stairs. A new Central Energy Plant was completed in the summer of 2017. It replaced an aging 60 year old plant and provides new efficiency boilers which in addition to providing the university directly with electricity, heated and chilled water, and helps the university cut emissions. A new science and engineering complex (SEC) was completed in the summer of 2017. The new building joins the newly rehabilitated 574 Boston Avenue in the expansion of classroom and laboratory facilities for the engineering school.

On September 24, 2016, U.S. Secretary of State John Kerry met with Boris Johnson, Frank-Walter Steinmeier, Paolo Gentiloni, Jean-Marc Ayrault and Federica Mogherini in the first ministerial meeting on the campus grounds to discuss issues relating to the UK's vote to withdraw from the EU, the Iran nuclear deal, and violence in Syria, particularly in Aleppo.

Joyce and Bill Cummings made a multi-million dollar donation through the Cummings Foundation for a new multidisciplinary building to be built on the Medford/Somerville campus. The Joyce Cummings Center is located between College and Boston Avenues. It hosts several STEM-related programs as well as Derby Entrepreneurship Center and Fletcher School's executive education and Global Master of Arts programs. Construction began in May 2019 and was opened to students in January 2022. A pickup-only Starbucks cafe was located inside the building, separately operated from Tufts Dining. The cafe closed September 2025 as part of Starbucks' scheme to close all pickup-only locations.

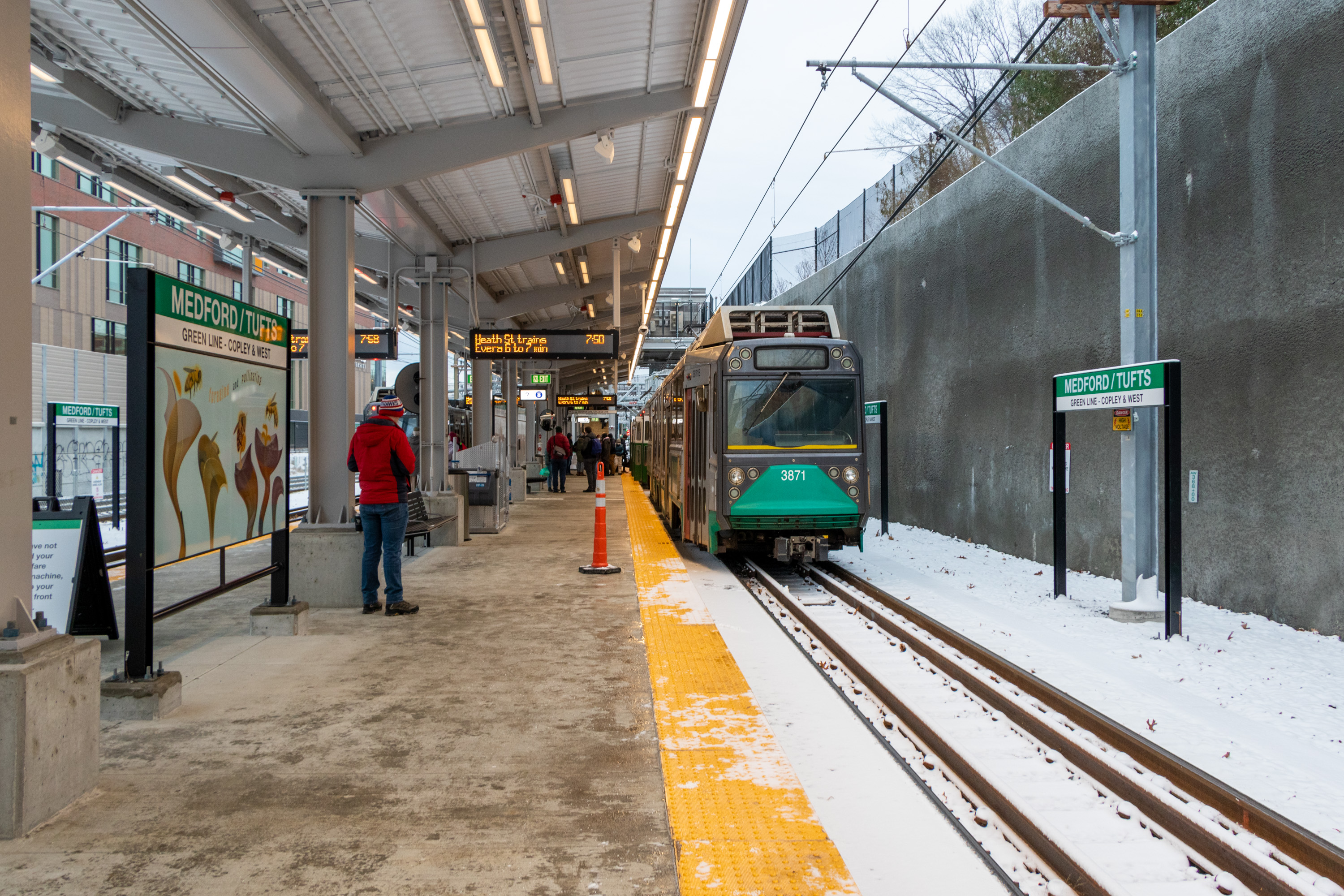
Medford/Tufts Station on Opening Day

As part of the MBTA's $2.28 billion Green Line Extension project, the university gained the Medford/Tufts station. The stop is the northern terminus of the E branch, located next to the Joyce Cummings Center and adjacent to Boston Avenue. The station opened on December 12, 2022, after numerous delays.

On November 17, 2022, the university announced that Sunil Kumar was to become Tufts' fourteenth president in 2023, succeeding Monaco. He assumed office on July 1, 2023, and was inaugurated on October 6, 2023. He is the first person of color to hold the position.

Tufts students joined other campuses across the United States in protests, setting up an encampment in protest against the Gaza war. The protestors' demands included disclosure of university investments and divestment from Israel. The encampment ended after a month with Tufts Students for Justice in Palestine (SJP) rejecting what it called a "bad faith deal" from the administration. About 100 members of the graduating class walked out during the main commencement ceremony, leading chants and issuing the same demands.

Tufts SJP announced its “formal break and disaffiliation from Tufts University” on November 15, 2024. This followed the university's decision to suspend the group through January 2027.

On March 25, 2025, Rümeysa Öztürk, a Tufts graduate student from Turkey, was detained by federal authorities near her home in Somerville. In March 2024, Öztürk had co-authored an op-ed in The Tufts Daily calling on Kumar to endorse TCU Senate resolutions for the university to recognize genocide in Gaza and divest from Israeli corporations. Kumar issued a affidavit in support of her release. She was released from Immigration and Customs Enforcement custody by a Vermont judge on May 9, 2025. An immigration judge later terminated her removal proceedings in February 2026, and Öztürk returned to Turkey in April after earning her Ph.D. in February.

Construction of a new 10-floor residence hall on Boston Ave. began April 2025 despite some local opposition by neighboring Medford residents. It will house more than 670 juniors and seniors with a mix of apartment-style units and retail space. The building’s opening is slated for fall 2027.
