= East Hall (Tufts University) =

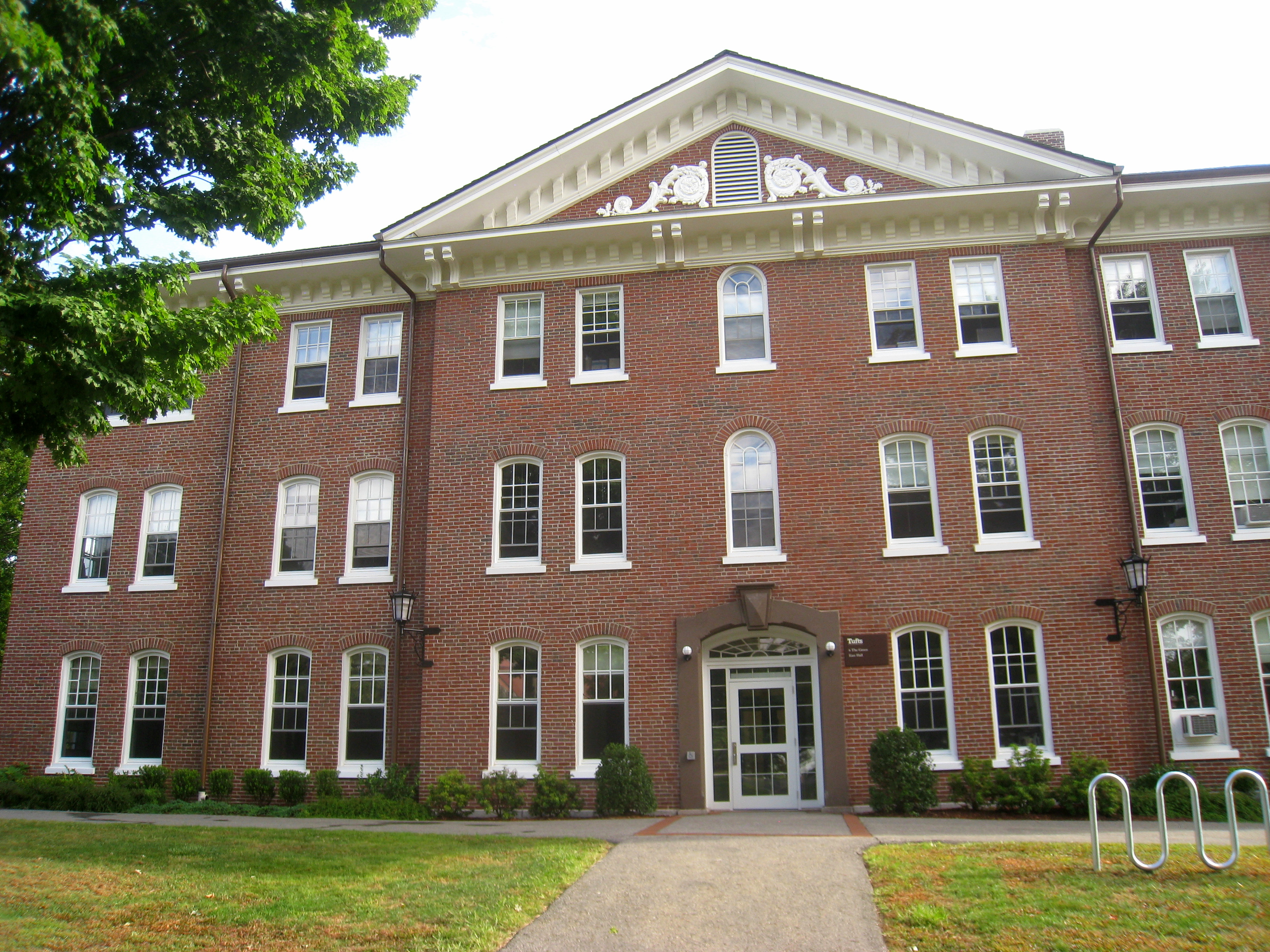
- East Hall

General information
- Type: Classroom, meeting space
- Architectural style: Italianate
- Town or city: Medford, Massachusetts
- Country: US
- Coordinates: 42.407650°N 71.118738°W
- Opened: 1860
- Renovated: 1937, 1945, 1966
- Cost: $19,191.90
- Owner: Tufts University

Technical details
- Material: Brick
- Floor count: Three

Design and construction
- Architect(s): Thomas Silloway

East Hall is a historic academic building on the campus of Tufts University in Medford, Massachusetts. Built in 1860 and designed by Thomas Silloway, it was Tufts' third building constructed on Walnut Hill following Ballou Hall in 1852 and Middle Hall (Packard Hall) in 1856. The building currently houses the Departments of English and History.

== Description ==
East Hall is a modest three-story rectangular block brick structure, topped by a low-pitched roof and pierced by several brick chimneys. The main facade poses a slight projection capped by a triangular pediment. Similar to Ballou, the building possesses an array of Italianate elements such as arched window headings, dentiled cornice moldings, and thick brownstone keystones. During the 20th century, window sashes, frames, windowsills, and the cornice were painted white to enhance the aesthetic character. The east end doorway was also removed as were most of the chimneys. Today it is considered a positive architectural presence on Walnut Hill.

== History ==
During one of the annual meetings on January 13, 1857, the Board of Trustees authorized the Executive Committee to plan for the creation of a new Boarding Hall. With an estimated cost of $10,000, on May 24, 1859, the Executive Committee voted for the creation of a new building across from Ballou. On May 29, 1860, they commissioned Thomas W. Silloway, a Boston architect who was also an ordained Unitarian clergyman to prepare plans and specifications for the new building. While he was primarily known for his ecclesiastical architecture, Silloway also secured commissions for public and higher education buildings. In May 1861, the Executive Committee reported the completion of East Hall at a cost of $19,191.90. The larger than expected expense was funded by a $50,000 state pledge made in 1859. When it opened, it contained a central staircase from which double-loaded corridors extended. A dining facility known as 'The Dive' was moved from Packard Hall to the basement, along with a kitchen and washroom, due to its advantage of being on the hill side with three walls having windows. It was used as the Commons dining hall for Tufts until the construction of Commons Hall, now Curtis Hall, in 1893. The interior has been remodeled several times in 1937, 1945, and 1966. During World War II it was put to military use where each of the two-person suites were converted to three-person rooms. and in 1966, it was converted from a men's dormitory and became the academic headquarters for the Departments of English, German and the Romance Languages. In 1989 with the construction of Olin Hall, the German and Romance Language Departments moved out, being replaced by the Department of History.
