= Hermon Carey Bumpus =

American academic

5th President of Tufts College
- In office 1915–1919
- Preceded by: William Leslie Hooper
- Succeeded by: John Albert Cousens

Personal details
- Born: May 5, 1862 Buckfield, Maine
- Died: June 21, 1943 (aged 81) Pasadena, California
- Education: Brown University, Clark University

Hermon Carey Bumpus (May 5, 1862 – June 21, 1943) was an American biologist, museum director, and the fifth president of Tufts College (later Tufts University).

== Early life and education ==
Hermon Carey Bumpus was born in Buckfield, Maine in 1862 and received a Ph.B. from Brown University in 1884, specializing in biology and science. He began graduate work at Brown before teaching at Olivet College. Bumpus received his Ph.D. from Clark University in 1891.

Bumpus joined the faculty of Brown as a professor of comparative zoology in 1890, where he emphasized active experimentation over the "didactic doldrums" of lectures. In 1893, Bumpus worked with colleagues Charles V. Chapin and John Howard Appleton in establishing a premedical program, one of the first premedical programs in the United States, with Bumpus as the director. Bumpus also established a Medical Association for physicians of Providence; in 1896 Bumpus demonstrated a Holtz machine to this group. He actually took the first x-ray images in Rhode Island around this time. His comparison of house sparrows that survived an uncommonly severe storm in 1898 with those that did not, including their respective measurements, has been cited as a classic example of natural selection in action.

Bumpus received an honorary Doctor of Science degree from Brown University in 1905. He received an honorary Doctor of Science from Tufts in 1905 and an honorary LL.D. from Clark in 1909. He was an elected member of both the American Philosophical Society and the American Academy of Arts and Sciences. He directed the Marine Biological Laboratory at Woods Hole, the U.S. Bureau of Fisheries laboratory, also at Woods Hole, and the American Museum of Natural History. Subsequently, he served as business manager of the University of Wisconsin.

== Career at Tufts ==
Bumpus became president of Tufts University in 1915, and was the first Tufts president who was not a Universalist; he had been chosen specifically because of his educational and administrative experience. He served president until 1919.

== Sources ==
- "Dr. Bumpus Heads Tufts College" (PDF). New York Times. 1914-09-18.
- "President Bumpus of Tufts Resigns" (PDF). New York Times. 1918-12-14.
- "Hermon Bumpus becomes President, 1915". Tufts interactive timeline. Archived from the original on 2009-02-18.
- Martha Mitchell. "Bumpus, Hermon Carey". Encyclopedia Brunoniana.
