= Packard Hall =

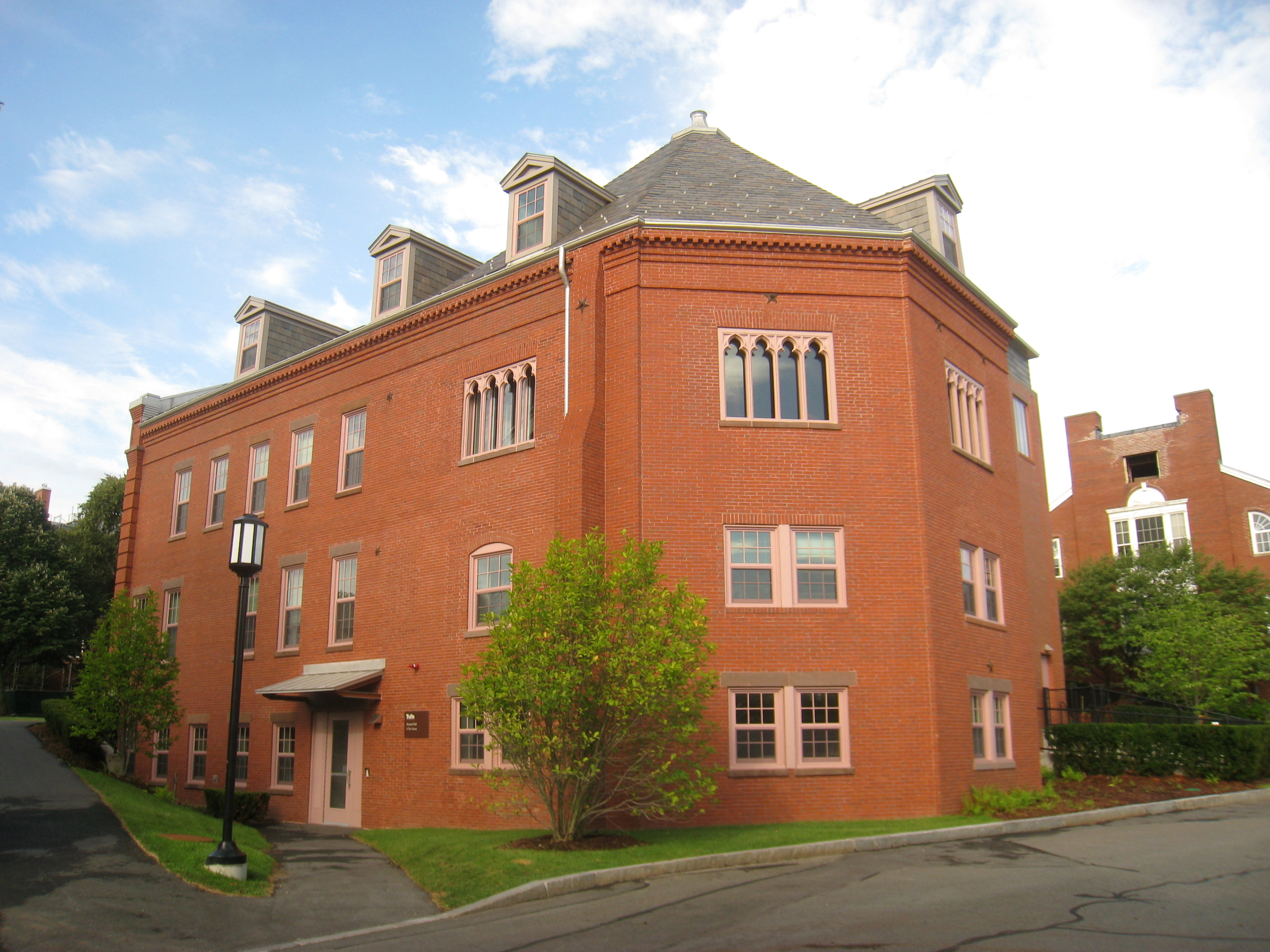
- Packard Hall
- Interactive map of the Packard Hall area
- Former names: Middle Hall

General information
- Type: Classroom
- Architectural style: Italianate
- Location: Medford, Massachusetts, US
- Coordinates: 42.407937°N 71.119354°W
- Named for: Sylvanus Packard
- Opened: 1856
- Renovated: 1885
- Cost: $9,715
- Owner: Tufts University

Technical details
- Material: Brick
- Floor count: Two

Renovating team
- Renovating firm: William Rawn Associates

Packard Hall, originally known as Middle Hall is a historic academic building on the campus of Tufts University in Medford, Massachusetts. Built in 1856, it was Tufts' second building constructed on Walnut Hill following Ballou Hall in 1852. The building currently houses the Department of Political Science.

== Description ==
The original section was a three-story-high, unembellished brick structure with arched windows and a modest entryway. The building is capped by a high pitched roof broken by dormer windows. The building originally had three tall chimneys which were removed when the building primarily became the library. The building later was ornamented with the addition of pediment detail, a cornice molding, corner quoins, and an enlarged entryway. A half-hexagonal turret with neo-gothic trimmed windows was added in 1885 during the library conversion. The building has largely retained its added ornamentation.

== History ==
After the opening of Ballou Hall, the board of trustees reorganized and recognized the need for a new dormitory. On May 29, 1855, they voted to authorize the Building Committee to erect a new building across from Ballou at a cost of $9,715. When the building was finished in 1856, it became known as Building A. Starting in 1885, it was known as Middle Hall and as the library. Prior to the construction of Eaton Library, the Tufts collection was dispersed between Packard and Ballou. The first floor of Packard accommodated reading rooms, while the second floor housed stacks. A half-hexagonal turret topped by a finial was added during the library conversion. Middle Hall was renamed Packard Hall in 1908 when the library moved to Eaton. The building was named after Sylvanus Packard, one of the first benefactors of the college.

Throughout its existence Packard Hall was plagued with structural problems, including moisture seepage and bulging walls. Fire hazard required students to move out in 1901, since wood stoves and fireplaces were not deemed safe for the building. When the library moved out, the building became the headquarters of the Crane Theological School and then the Department of English. During the 1930s, it was considered to be demolished to make way for a large graduate hall that would accommodate the Fletcher School of Law and Diplomacy. In the 1970s, the building was renovated, and in 2008, William Rawn fully restored the building and added a four-story tower on the west side containing a second stairway and elevator. Afterwards, the building went to the Department of Political Science.
