= Eaton Hall (Tufts University) =

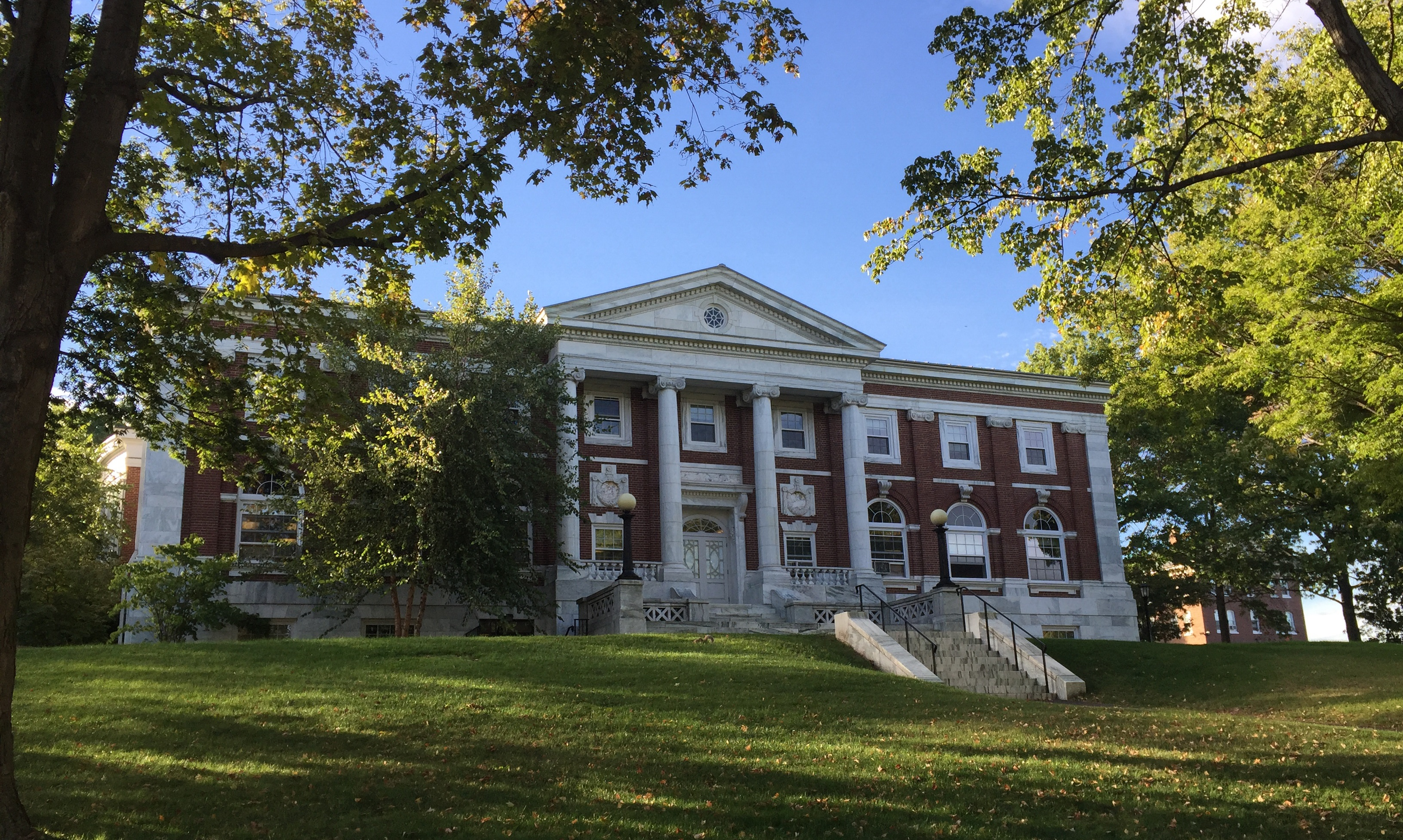
- Eaton Hall
- Interactive map of the Eaton Hall area
- Former names: Eaton Memorial Library

General information
- Type: Library, classroom
- Architectural style: Neoclassical
- Location: Medford, Massachusetts, US
- Coordinates: 42.406832°N 71.118674°W
- Named for: Rev. Charles H. Eaton
- Groundbreaking: 1905
- Opened: 1908
- Renovated: 1949
- Owner: Tufts University

Technical details
- Material: Brick, marble
- Floor count: Three

Design and construction
- Architect: Whitfield & King

Renovating team
- Architect: Arland A. Dirlam

Eaton Hall, built in 1908 as Eaton Memorial Library, used to be the main library building at Tufts University in Medford, Massachusetts. The historic building was designed by Whitfield & King and donated to the university by Andrew Carnegie. It was one of the first college libraries built with Carnegie funds and is one of the few that never bore his name. Today the building houses departmental offices, classrooms and a computer lab.

== History ==
In 1904, Andrew Carnegie donated $100,000 to build a library on the Tufts campus. The building was one of 43 libraries which he built in Massachusetts. Mrs. Carnegie decided that rather than having the library share the Carnegie name, the building would be a memorial to Rev. Charles H. Eaton who had presided over her wedding in New York City in 1887. Eaton was a Tufts alumnus from the Class of 1874, and was president of the Mathematican [sic?] Club. Eaton later graduated from the Crane Theological School with a divinity degree in 1887. Eaton also served as the president of the New York Association of Tufts College.

Construction began in 1905, and was completed in 1908. Originally the books were stored in College Hall, now Ballou Hall where students were allowed to access the collection for one hour a week. Later on, it was stored in Middle Hall, now Packard Hall. When the collection moved to Eaton, the collection was split up into four specialized libraries in chemistry, engineering, physics-mathematics, and religion. The cost of equipping the library was over $11,000 and shelving was not completed until 1938. The library could hold about 73,000 volumes and 64,000 pamphlets. In 1950, an addition doubled the space for the library. The new wing became the reading room and contained plaques dedicated to 102 Tufts students and alumni who lost their lives during World War II. It was dedicated on December 7, 1950. In 1965, the collection outgrew the building and a new library deemed Wessell library was constructed next to Eaton. The interior has since become a lounge and later classrooms and a computer lab.

== Architecture ==
The building is centrally located on top of Walnut Hill. The New York firm Whitfield & King designed the building in a neoclassical style with red brick walls, elaborate marble columns and trim. The main entrance displays an imposing pediment supported by four Corinthian columns and elevated on a marble slab. The original main entrance opened up to a main hall with a grand staircase, flanked on either end by a reading room and a lecture room. Beneath the stairs was the entrance to the stacks. The stack area was designed to hold 200,000 books. The grand staircase led to a second floor with six spaces for special collections and two archivist offices. The addition, later built in 1949–50, was designed by Arland A. Dirlam to match the style of the original section.

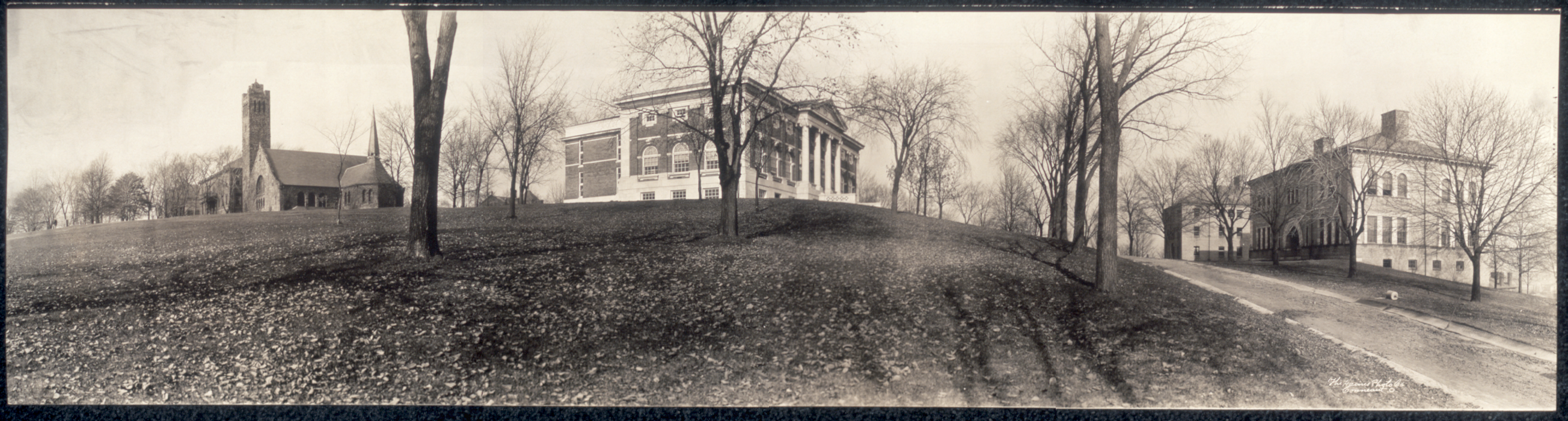
Newly constructed Eaton Hall on the Tufts campus
