= George Stewart Miller =

American academic administrator

President of Tufts College
- In office 1937–1938
- Preceded by: John Albert Cousens
- Succeeded by: Leonard Carmichael

Personal details
- Born: May 12, 1884; Lawrence, Massachusetts
- Died: June 27, 1971 (aged 87)

George Stewart Miller (May 12, 1884 – June 1971) was the acting president of Tufts College (later Tufts University) from 1937 to 1938, between the terms of the sixth and seventh elected presidents.

== Early life and education ==
Miller was born in Lawrence, Massachusetts in 1884. He received a bachelor of arts degree from Tufts in 1906, a master of arts degree from Tufts in 1907, and an honorary LL.D. from Tufts in 1941. He was a teacher of physics and history at Concord High School from 1907 to 1909; assistant principal at Monson Academy from 1909 to 1912, and head of the history department at Medford High School from 1912 to 1916.

== Career at Tufts ==
Miller worked as a government professor at Tufts from 1916 to 1956, and as chairman of the Department of Government from 1939 to 1956.

Concurrently, Miller served as the secretary to the president of Tufts from 1916 to 1919, and as assistant to the president from 1919 to 1937. From 1937 to 1938, he served as acting president of Tufts. Subsequently, he served as vice-president and Dean of the Faculty of Arts and Sciences from 1939 to 1951, and Dean of Administration for Tufts from 1951 to 1956. Upon his retirement as Dean of Administration, he was awarded the distinction of Dean Emeritus.

Additionally, he was elected president of the Tufts Alumni Association, and served in that role from 1954 to 1960.

Miller Hall, a dormitory on Tufts' Medford campus, is named in his honor.

== Sources ==
- "George Stuart Miller acting President, 1937-1938". Tufts Interactive Timeline. Archived from the original on 2009-02-18.
- "Concise Encyclopedia of Tufts History: "Miller, George Stewart, 1884-1971"". Tufts Digital Library. Archived from the original on 2010-06-09.
