= John Albert Cousens =

American businessman

6th President of Tufts College
- In office 1920–1937
- Preceded by: Hermon Carey Bumpus
- Succeeded by: George Stewart Miller

Personal details
- Born: November 17, 1874 Brookline, Massachusetts
- Died: July 2, 1937 (aged 62) Medford, Massachusetts

John Albert Cousens (November 17, 1874 – July 2, 1937) was an American Universalist businessman and educator who was the sixth president of Tufts College (later Tufts University) from 1919 to 1937.

== Life ==
Cousens was born in Brookline, Massachusetts to Sarah (Wiggen) and John Emmons Cousens, members of the Shawmut Universalist Society. He entered Tufts College in Medford in 1894, but dropped out during his senior year after his father's death in order to run the family coal company, not receiving his B.A. until 1903.

His company flourished, eventually merging with the Metropolitan Coal Company. He gained business experience as its vice president, and served in many high-level positions of the Brookline Savings Bank and other Brookline financial organizations.

He married Elizabeth Frances Edwards in 1906 and they raised their niece Isabel Jean but had no other children. He was a member of the Audubon Society, the American Museum of Natural History, the Massachusetts Horticultural Society, and the Massachusetts Society for the Prevention of Cruelty to Animals.

== Presidency ==
As an alumnus of Tufts, Cousens was involved in many aspects of alumni operations, and became a trustee in 1911, serving on the finance committee, the board of visitors to the medical school, and the executive committee. He was thus a potential replacement for the office of president upon the resignation of Hermon Carey Bumpus in 1919.

He was initially appointed acting president due to the trustees' concern over his lack of experience in education, but within a year impressed them enough to make him president.

His presidency coincided with the Great Depression, but he managed to keep the college's finances in good shape and modestly improve the campus, adding one building to the campus each year, including the Cousens Gymnasium, built in 1931–1932.

During Cousens' presidency, Tufts remained a small regional institution. However, he began administrative reforms that later allowed Tufts to grow into an international university, including taking the management and day-to-day operations of the college from the trustees and putting them in the hands of a centralized administration. He also attempted to institute academic reforms such as a more competitive three-tier system that base Bachelor's and professional degrees on stricter expectations of quality work; however, these and other controversial curriculum reforms failed due to faculty opposition.

He also oversaw the 1930 creation of the New England Medical Center, a joint operation of the Tufts Medical School, the Boston Dispensary, and the Boston Floating Hospital. In 1933, the Fletcher School of Law and Diplomacy was established jointly with Harvard Law School.

Cousens courted alumni and students, writing for the alumni magazine and the weekly newspaper and giving students, including the poet John Holmes, private financial aid.

== Death ==
He died while in office on July 2, 1937, of a heart attack, and the funeral service was held at Goddard Chapel. The trustees passed a resolution stating that "Tufts has been a small college, but it will be a great college in its ultimate achievement because John Cousens loved it."

== Sources ==
- Seaburg, Alan. "John Cousens". Unitarian Universalist Historical Society. Archived from the original on 2008-04-29.
- Sauer, Anne (ed.). "Cousens, John Albert". Concise Encyclopedia of Tufts History.
