= William Leslie Hooper =

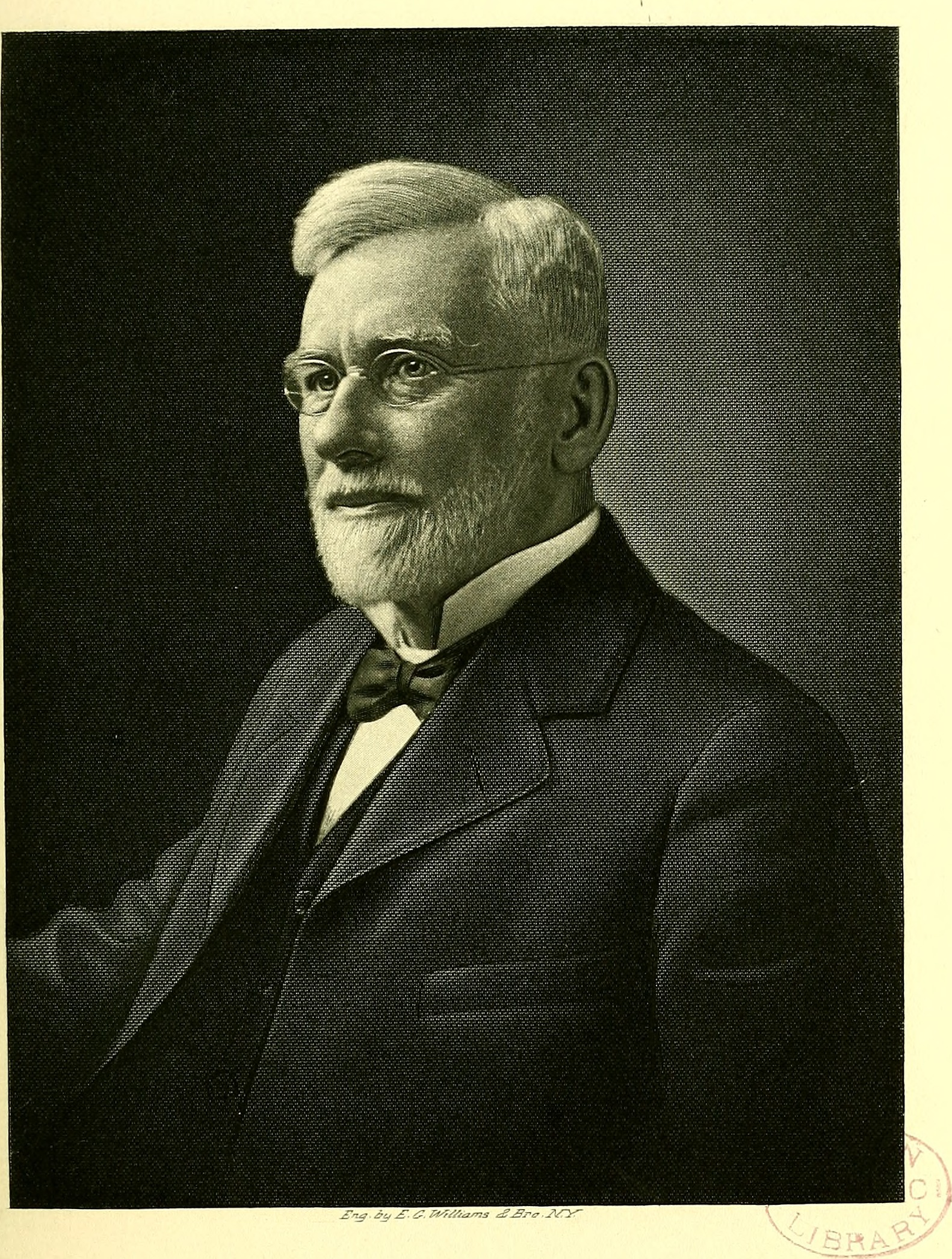

President of Tufts College
- In office 1912–1914
- Preceded by: Frederick W. Hamilton
- Succeeded by: Hermon Carey Bumpus

Personal details
- Born: August 2, 1855; Halifax, Nova Scotia
- Died: October 3, 1918 (aged 63); Medford, Massachusetts

William Leslie Hooper (August 2, 1855 – October 3, 1918) was the acting president of Tufts College (later Tufts University) from 1912 to 1914, between the terms of the fourth and fifth elected presidents.

== Early life and education ==
Hooper was born in Halifax, Nova Scotia, in 1855. He received a bachelor of arts degree from Tufts in 1877, and a master of arts degree from Tufts in 1878. He also received an honorary Ph.D. in 1898 and an LL.D. in 1915, both from Tufts. Hooper was instructor of Mathematics and Applied Physics at the Bromfield School and became its principal in 1880. While at Tufts, Hooper was initiated into Theta Delta Chi.

== Career ==
Hooper became assistant professor of physics at Tufts in 1883, and then professor of electrical engineering in 1890. In 1902, Hooper published "Electrical Problems" upon which he based many lectures, as described by Vannevar Bush.

Following the resignation of Frederick W. Hamilton, Hooper was made acting president in 1912, having been commended by the Trustees for his contributions to the engineering department and his successful fundraising abilities. He served in this role through the end of 1914 until Hermon Carey Bumpus took office, at which point he returned to the department of electrical engineering.

Hooper built a residence at 124 Professors Row in 1892, known today as Hooper House, which currently houses the University Health Services. Additionally, the home of the department of electrical engineering was dedicated as the Hooper Laboratories for Electrical Engineering on June 5, 1940, and held that name until 1983, when it was rededicated as Halligan Hall.

Hooper built by hand a cottage on an island in Brompton Lake, Quebec, about which he wrote several poems. Hooper's poem "A Legend of Outunwitti" helped scholars study indigenous oral tradition and Brompton Lake geographical place name origins.

== Additional sources ==
- "William L. Hooper A.M." Tufts Digital Library.
- "Concise Encyclopedia of Tufts History: "Hooper House, 1892"". Tufts Digital Library.
- "Concise Encyclopedia of Tufts History: "Hooper, William Leslie, 1855-1918"". Tufts Digital Library.
- "Concise Encyclopedia of Tufts History: "Halligan Hall, 1925"". Tufts Digital Library.
