= Frederick W. Hamilton =

Frederick William Hamilton

4th President of Tufts College
- In office 1905–1912
- Preceded by: Elmer Hewitt Capen
- Succeeded by: William Leslie Hooper

Personal details
- Born: May 30, 1860; Portland, Maine
- Died: May 22, 1940 (aged 79); Boston, Massachusetts

Frederick William Hamilton (March 30, 1860 – May 22, 1940) was an American Universalist businessman and the fourth president of Tufts University from 1905 to 1912. Born in Portland, Maine, he received his Bachelor of Arts from Tufts in 1880 and his Master of Arts in English literature and philosophy in 1886, in addition to an honorary Doctor of Divinity in 1889 and, from St. Lawrence University, an honorary Doctor of Laws in 1906.

As president, due to his strong opposition to coeducation, he created a separate Jackson College for Women, with a separate faculty and administration. He resigned in 1912 due to having lost the trust of the Tufts Community. He later became manager of a forestry company and died in Boston in 1940. He was Grand Secretary of the Grand Lodge of Massachusetts, and a member of Theta Delta Chi.
