= Tufts University Libraries =

Research libraries at Tufts University, U.S.

The library system of Tufts University (Tufts Libraries) supports all academic departments comprising the university, located in Greater Boston in the U.S. state of Massachusetts. The main library is Tisch Library, which holds about 2.5 million volumes, with other holdings dispersed at subject libraries.

== History ==
Tufts' library was established in 1850 with a gift of seven volumes, three years before classes began. The collection moved from building to building on the academic quad until in 1908, Tufts' first library building, Eaton Memorial Library (now Eaton Hall), was made possible with a donation from Andrew Carnegie. Carnegie's wife requested that the building be named after a Tufts graduate, Reverend Charles Eaton, who had presided over her wedding.

The building received an extension in 1950 with the construction of the War Memorial Library in honor of the Tufts alumni who served in World War II. By 1965 the collection outgrew the building and was moved to a new main library named the Wessell Library.

=== Wessell Library ===
The building was originally designed in a brutalist style by Campbell and Aldrich. Construction started in January 1964, and the library was originally named after Tufts' eighth president Nils Yngve Wessell. The $2.9 million library was dedicated in September 1965. Wessell Library succeeded Eaton Memorial Library as the main library on campus, and was constructed next to it.

The original 1965 structure contained stacks and offices on the first floor; circulation, a reference desk, and study space on the second floor; and special collections, including the Crane School collection, the Tufts collection, and audio-visual aids, on the third floor.

From August 1994 to October 1996, the library was enlarged in a $21 million renovation, designed by Shepley Bulfinch Richardson and Abbott. The project added 80,000 square feet (7,400 m^{2}) to Wessell, and renovated the original structure. In 1995, with the addition of 80,000 square feet (7,400 m^{2}), the main library was renamed Tisch Library.

=== Renaming ===
The Wessell library was renamed the Tisch Library in honor of the Tisch family, thanks to a contribution by the Tisch Foundation that was committed by Preston Tisch. The rechristened library was formally dedicated on October 10, 1996. As the library's collections continued to grow, unfinished space beneath the first floor was converted to stacks and study space, opening to the public as "Level G" in 2004. That same year, the Tower Café opened on the second floor.

== Tisch Library ==
Tisch Library
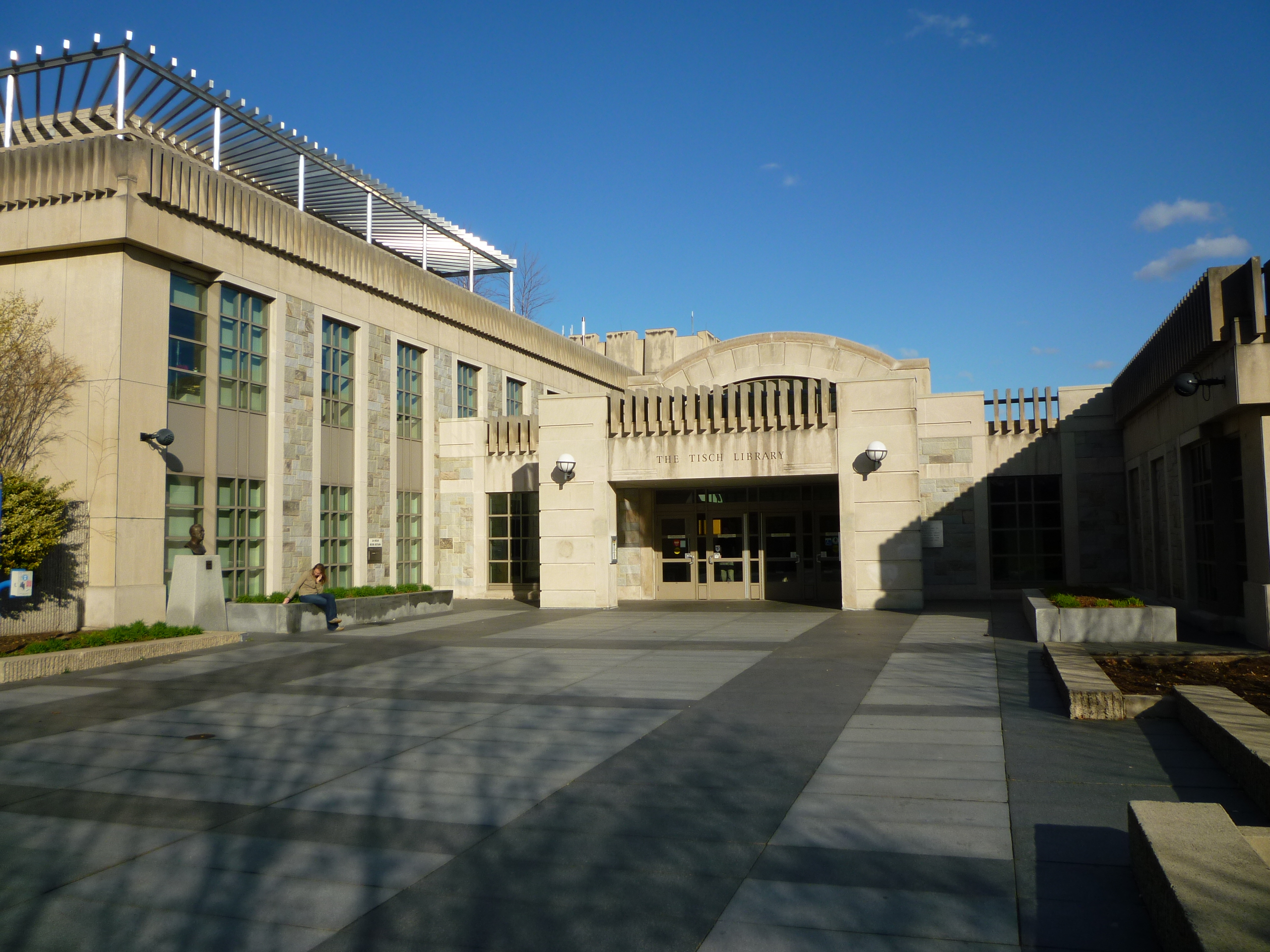
- 42.4062°N 71.1189°W
- Location: 35 Professors Row, Medford, Massachusetts
- Established: 1965 (as Wessell Library); 1996 (as Tisch Library)

Collection
- Size: 2.7 million

Other information
- Affiliation: Boston Library Consortium
- Website: tischlibrary.tufts.edu

The library holds 2.7 million volumes and serves as the main branch of the Tufts library system. Tisch Library has two branches focused on the arts: Lilly Music Library at the Granoff Music Center in Medford, and the W. Van Alan Clark, Jr. Library at the School of the Museum of Fine Arts at Tufts in Boston.

As of 2023, the library houses stacks and the Tufts Archival Research Center on Level G; stacks, study rooms, and the Special Collections classroom on the first floor; circulation, the Hirsh Reading Room, the Data Lab, and the Tower Café on the second floor; and classroom space and the Digital Design Studio on the third floor.

The Tisch Library is a member of the Boston Library Consortium, a library consortium of academic libraries located in New England.

=== W. Van Alan Clark, Jr. Library ===
The Clark Library, located at the School of the Museum of Fine Arts at Tufts (SMFA) in the Fenway-Kenmore district of Boston, is the fine arts branch of the Tisch Library. It is not affiliated with the Fenway Library Organization, a consortium of several other nearby university and museum libraries. The Clark Library collection is focused "on contemporary art and studio practice, our collections encompass exhibition catalogs, monographs, theoretical and art historical texts, technical manuals, periodicals, media, artists' books, zines, and more".

With the late-2022 opening of the Green Line Extension of the MBTA Green Line E branch light rail transit route, there is a one-seat direct connection between the SMFA and the main campus of Tufts University in Medford.

== Smaller libraries ==
In addition to the main library, there are a few smaller libraries that serve specialized fields:

- Edward Ginn Library – provides collections and services for the Fletcher School. It is one of the largest specialized libraries in the field of international affairs. The collection holds over 120,000 volumes.
- Hirsh Health Sciences Library – provides resources for the School of Medicine, School of Dental Medicine, Friedman School of Nutrition Science and Policy, the Sackler School of Graduate Biomedical Sciences and the HNRCA. The library has been operating since the 1960s, and was rededicated in 2005 as the Hirsh Health Sciences Library.
- Webster Family Library of Veterinary Medicine – located on the Grafton campus, supports the clinical programs of both the Large Animal Hospital and the Foster Hospital for Small Animals, as well as the informational needs of the students in the Doctor of Veterinary Medicine (DVM), Master’s and PhD programs.
