= Goddard Hall (Tufts University) =

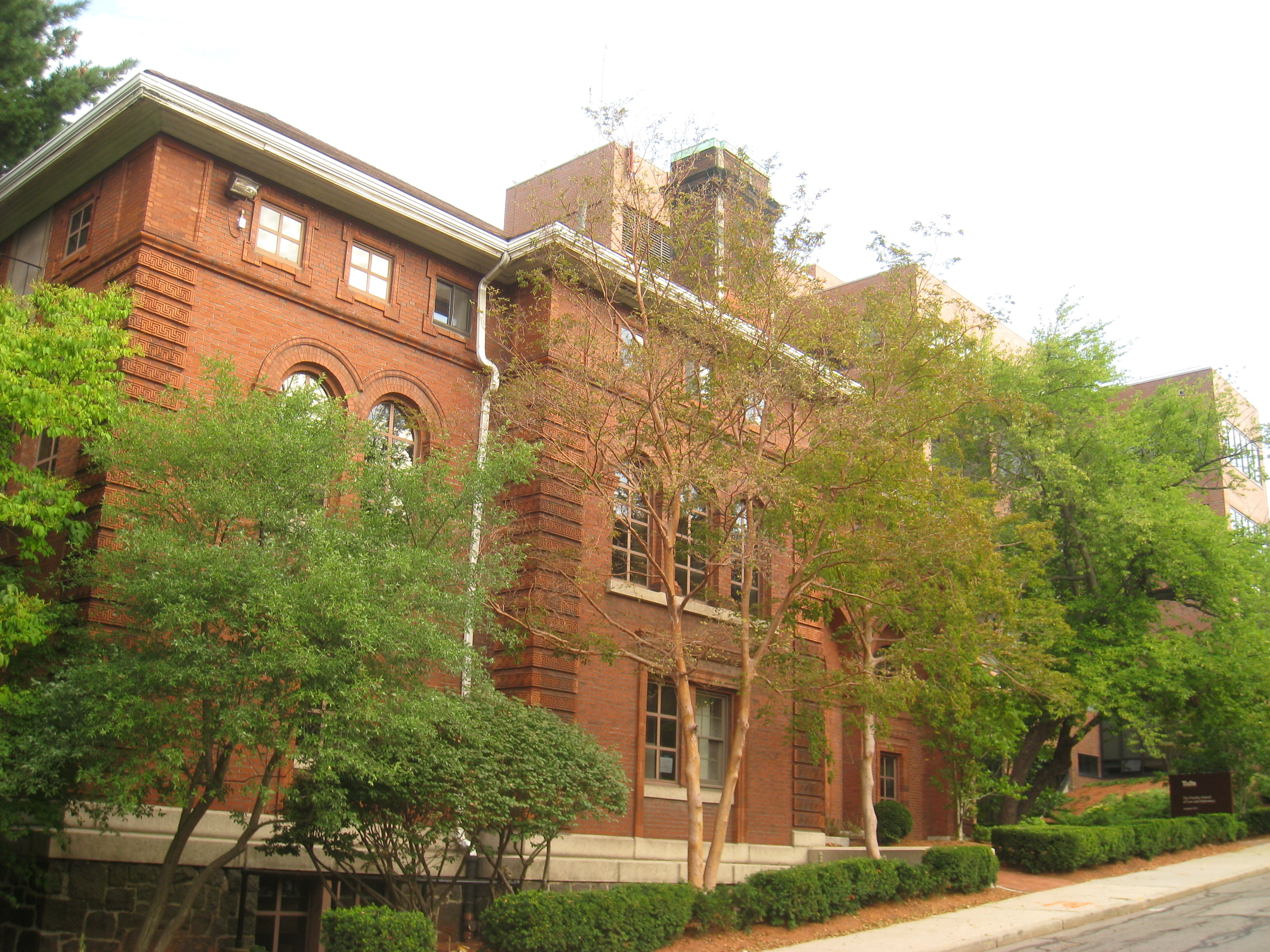
- Goddard Hall
- Former names: Goddard Gymnasium

General information
- Type: Library, gymnasium
- Architectural style: Romanesque Revival
- Town or city: Medford, Massachusetts
- Country: US
- Coordinates: 42.407631°N 71.121587°W
- Named for: Thomas Goddard
- Opened: 1883
- Renovated: 1892, 1930
- Owner: Tufts University

Technical details
- Material: Brick
- Floor count: Three

Design and construction
- Architect(s): George Albert Clough

Renovating team
- Architect(s): George Albert Clough

Goddard Hall, originally known as Goddard Gymnasium, is a historic academic building on the campus of Tufts University in Medford, Massachusetts. Built in 1883 and designed by George Albert Clough, it was originally built to serve Tufts students as a gymnasium. In 1892, the building was remodeled and in 1930, the building was handed over to the Fletcher School of Law and Diplomacy for use as a library.

== Description ==
Goddard Hall was originally built as a three-story rectangular brick building with arched windows. The south and east facade were highly altered from the original design but still contain the same motif of arched windows and egg-and-dart molding of the original section. The 1892 facade also makes extensive use of Meander motifs in the corner quoins.

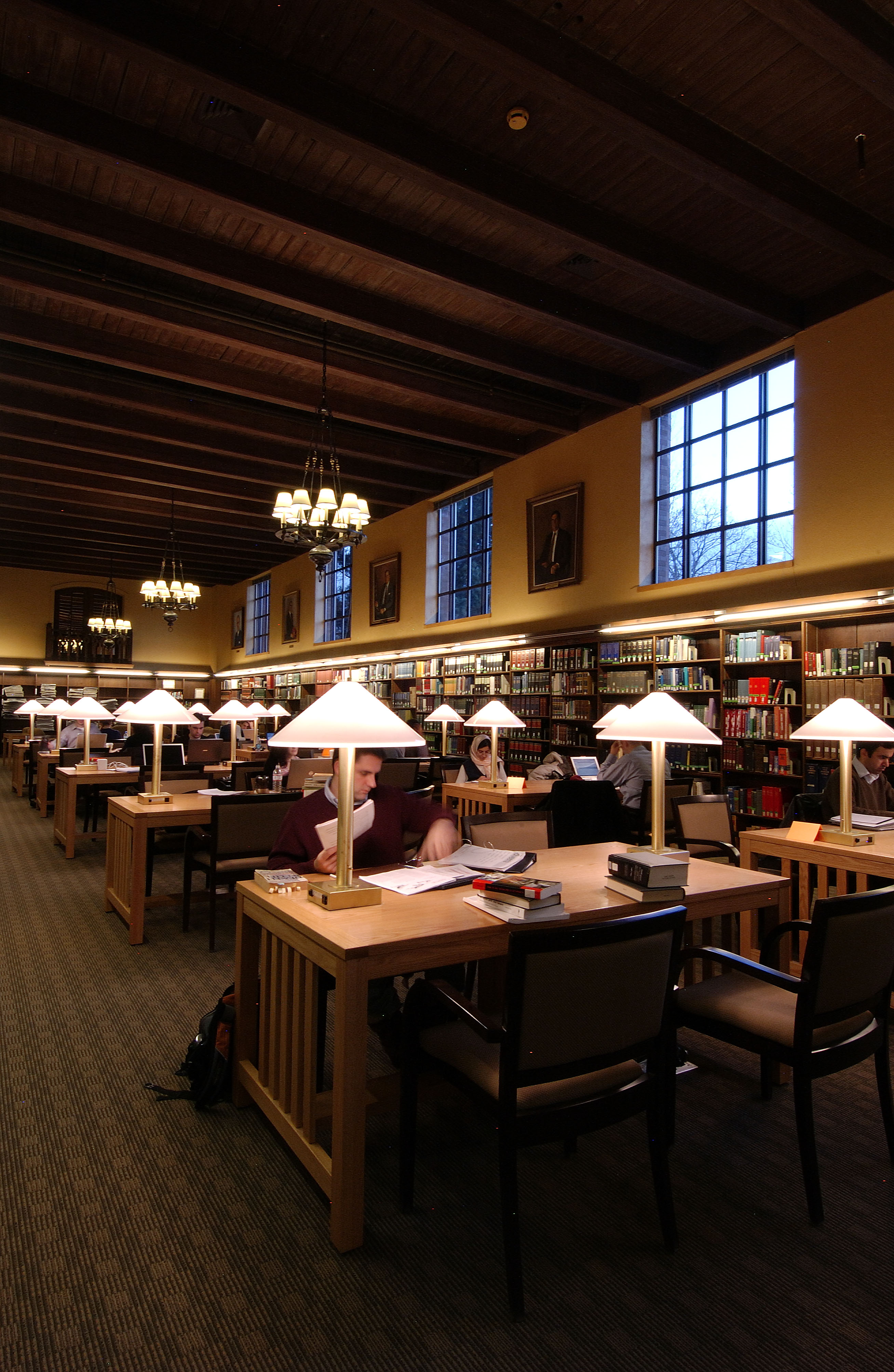
Interior of Goddard Hall now Ginn Library

== History ==
Prior to construction, students would exercise by using an open-air gym behind West Hall. Announcement of construction of Goddard Hall came at the same time as that of the Barnum Museum of Natural History. The building was built with funds from Mary T. Goddard who also assisted in the construction of Goddard Chapel. The university commissioned George Clough who was well known in Boston for his restoration of the Old State House, and the design of the Suffolk County Courthouse. The original building provided basic facilities, including an open main floor and locker and shower facilities located in the basement. In 1897, freshmen and sophomores were required two hours of week at the gymnasium from Thanksgiving until Spring recess. At the time, the building was the only large space used for dances and large gatherings. The building was also used for commencement dinner each year. In 1898, the demands to expand the building were approved by the board of trustees. Additions to the front and sides provided the building with a basketball cage and dance floor above. An indoor track was also built at the level of the dance floor, in addition to a gallery around the main gym area. The Department of Music was given rooms on the third floor.

In 1930, Goddard Gymnasium became Goddard Hall, when the gymnasium moved to Cousens Gym on College Avenue. The building was handed over to the new Fletcher School of Law and Diplomacy. The interior space was converted into what is now known as Ginn Library. The main part houses a large reading room while the top floors are reserved for stacks, office space, and seminar rooms. The structure was connected to Mugar Hall in the west in 1960, and the Cabot Intercultural Center in 1980.
