= Goddard Chapel (Tufts University) =

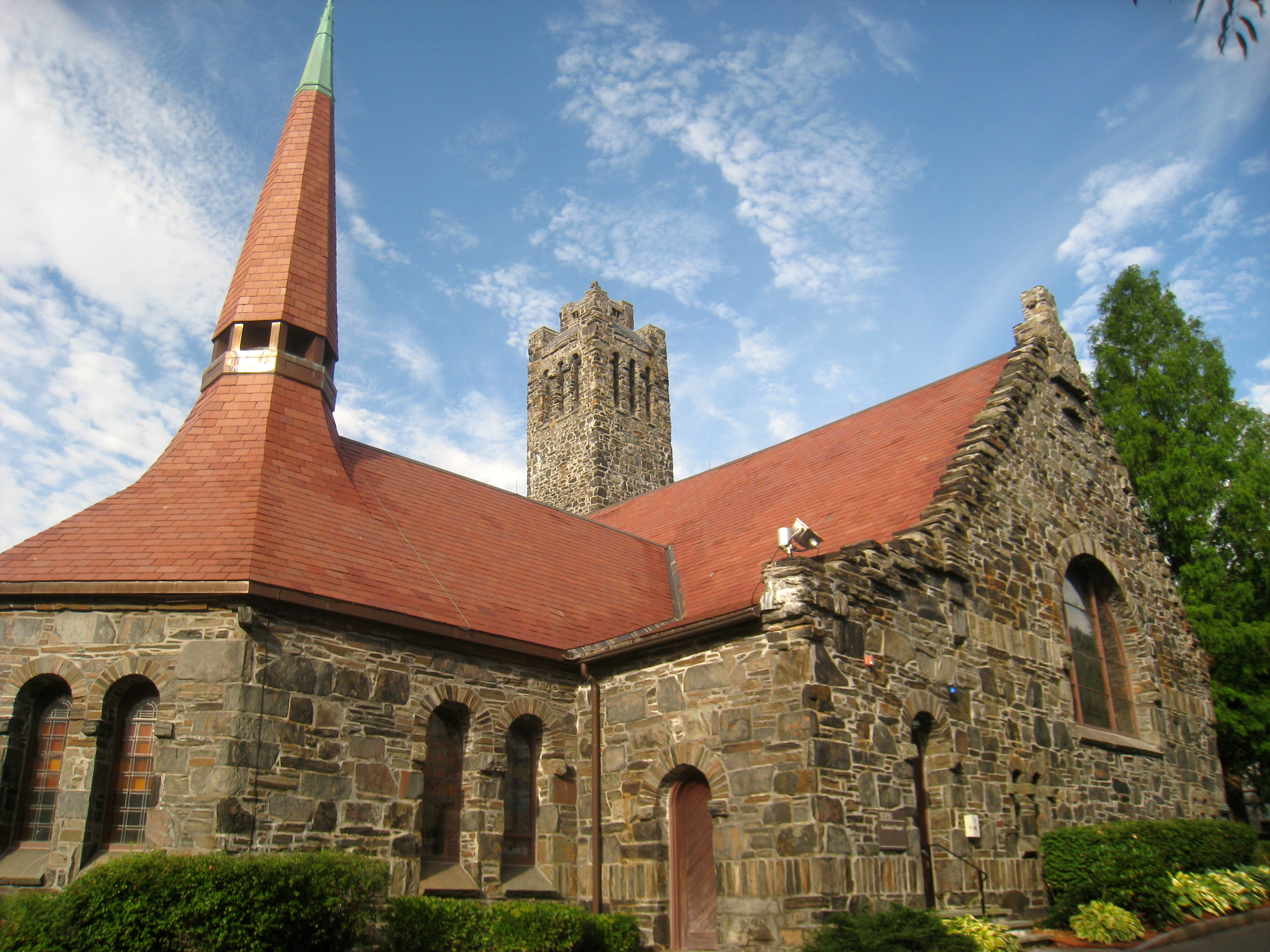
- Goddard Chapel

General information
- Type: Chapel
- Architectural style: Lombardic Romanesque
- Location: Medford, Massachusetts, US
- Coordinates: 42.407092°N 71.119326°W
- Named for: Thomas Goddard
- Renovated: 1959, 2002
- Cost: $43,777.33
- Owner: Tufts University

Technical details
- Material: Blue-gray slate

Design and construction
- Architects: J. Philip Rinn, Tommaso Juglaris

Renovating team
- Architect: Arland A. Dirlam

Goddard Chapel, built in 1883, is the main religious building at Tufts University in Medford, Massachusetts. The historic chapel was built in the Lombard Romanesque style.

== Description ==
The building was designed by J. Phillip Rinn, who also designed the Barnum Museum of Natural History and part of Metcalf Hall at Tufts. The edifice was designed in the Lombardic Romanesque Style, with the chapel's hundred-foot bell tower and its cloister, a porch on the east side of the building. The blue-gray slate was quarried locally from Somerville. Originally, Rinn planned the chapel to be covered with ivy to soften the austerity of the stonework. The interior design also follows Romanesque motifs with the incorporation of the ribbed ceilings, arched woodwork, and stained glass. The pews, pulpit, and ceiling ribs are made of cherry. The floors are made of oak while the paneling is made of spruce. Today virtually all of the original woodwork is intact. In 2002, the chapel underwent a major restoration. The project returned the chapel ceiling which was painted blue to its native wood. The organ, located on the left side of the chancel, was modernized by removing cherry stained wood decorations and panels in front of case pipes. The Andover Organ Company was contracted to rebuild the organ and restore the front of the chapel.

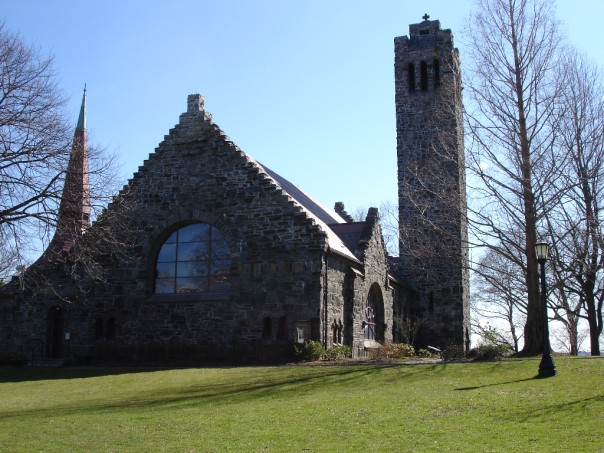
Goddard Chapel on the Green at Tufts

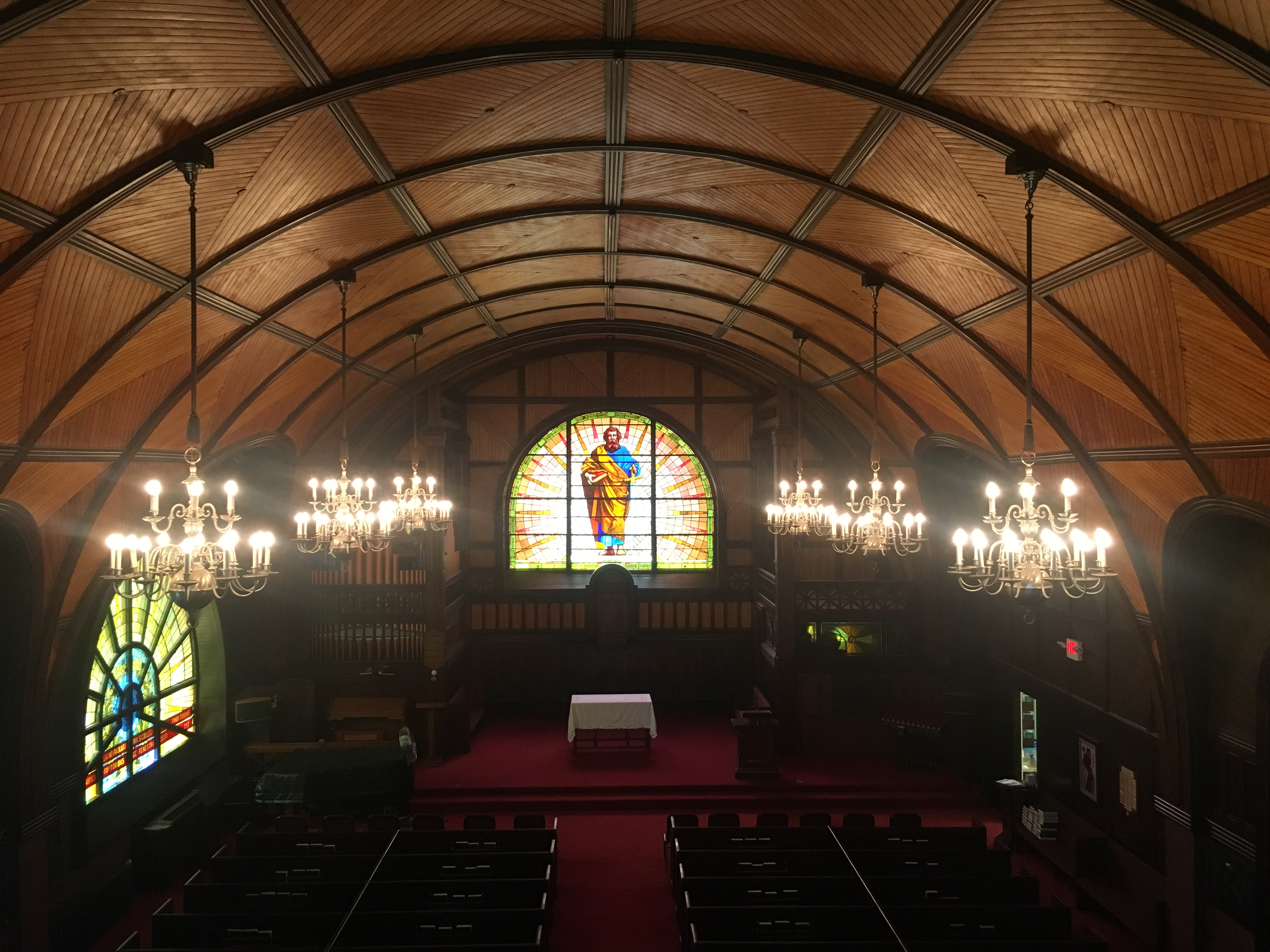
Interior of Goddard Chapel

=== Windows ===
Tommaso Juglaris, an Italian born artist collaborated in the design and creation of the stained glass windows. Instead of painting on the glass, the colors were etched in, allowing more light to enter the building. The large window behind the pulpit was installed in honor of Tufts trustee Thomas Goddard, and it depicts St. Paul wearing brown and blue robes (the Tufts colors). The opposite window depicts St. John the Evangelist and was built in memory of Tufts' first president Hosea Ballou II. On the west wall there is a stained glass window depicting St. Mark. The three windows on the east side of the chapel also served as memorials. Their designs were inspired by the works of Jean-François Millet.

== History ==
In the early days of the college, the Coolidge Room on the second floor of Ballou Hall was known as the College Chapel. In 1882, Mary Goddard, also known for founding Goddard College, contributed $25,000 toward the chapel's construction in honor of her late husband, Tufts trustee Thomas Goddard. At the same time she also donated money for the construction of the Goddard Gymnasium. Additional donations were made by Tufts alumni with the expectation that the chapel would serve as a memorial chapel. In total, construction costs exceeded $40,000. Student attendance at Protestant chapel services was mandatory until 1907, when the chapel held three services per week, led by the deans and faculty at Tufts' Crane Theological School. When the Crane Theological School closed in 1969, a wing of the chapel was converted to house the new Office of the University Chaplain. In recent years, the chapel has housed not only Protestant services but also Catholic mass, Buddhist meditation, Hindu pujas, weddings, memorial services, vigils, lectures, and concerts.
