= Ballou Hall =

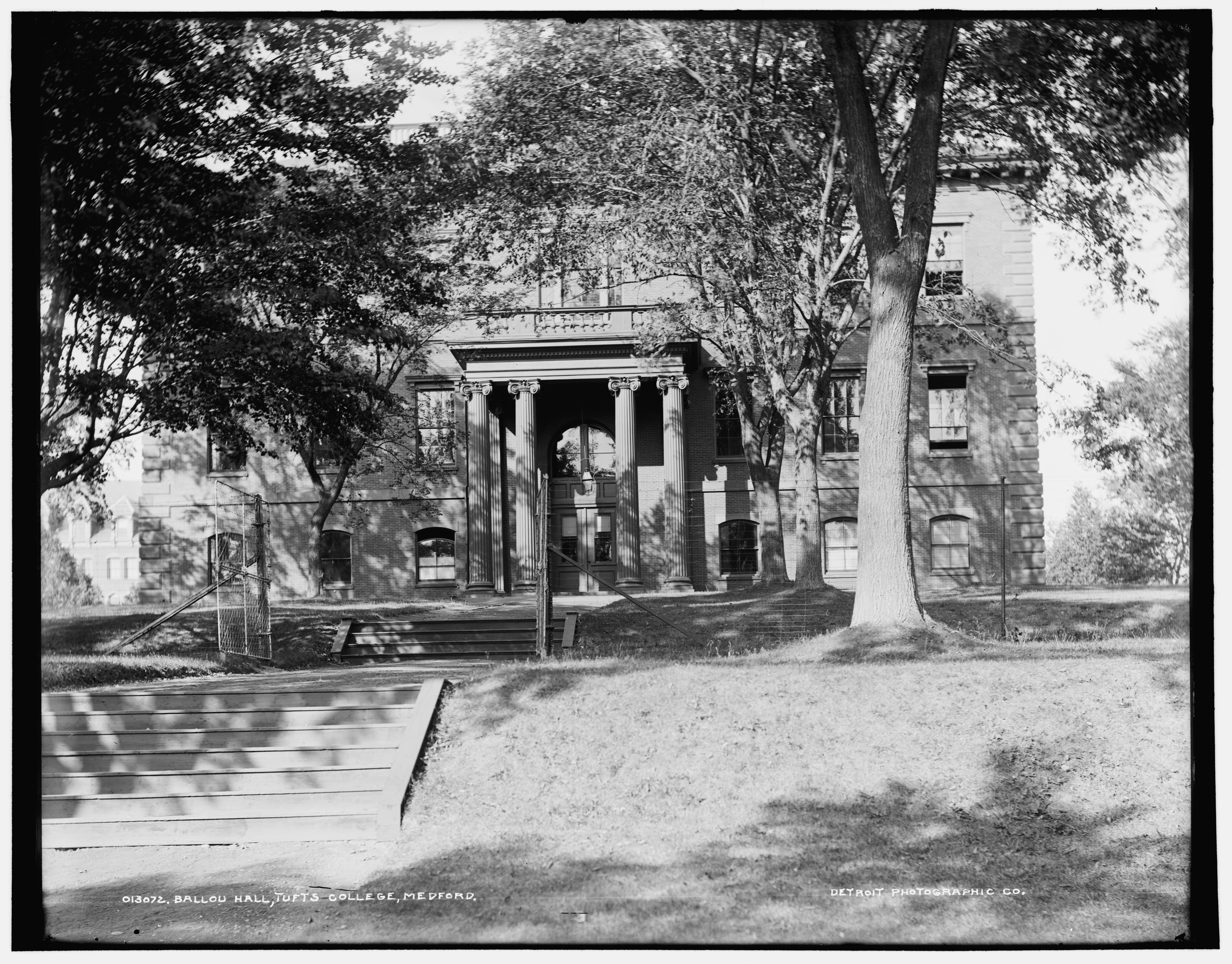
- Ballou Hall in 1905
- Former names: College Hall

General information
- Type: Administrative
- Architectural style: Italianate
- Location: Medford, Massachusetts, US
- Coordinates: 42.4075964°N 71.1203308°W
- Named for: Hosea Ballou II
- Groundbreaking: July 19, 1852
- Renovated: 1955
- Owner: Tufts University

Technical details
- Material: Brick
- Floor count: Three

Design and construction
- Architect: Gridley J.F. Bryant

Renovating team
- Renovating firm: McKim, Mead, and White

Ballou Hall is a historic academic building on the campus of Tufts University in Medford, Massachusetts. Its cornerstone was laid in 1853 and the building was completed the following year. Designed by Gridley J.F. Bryant, it was Tufts' first academic building following the College's establishment by a group of Universalists. The building was later restored by McKim, Mead, and White and remains the center of administration for the university.

== Description ==
Credit for the architectural design was questioned until Bryant's signature surfaced on a college legal document. During the 1850s, Bryant had been well known in Boston for designing civic and commercial buildings such as Boston City Hall and the Suffolk County Jail, however he prepared very few educational buildings. His design for Ballou is a refined version of Hathorn Hall which he designed for Bates College. The rectangular building was designed to be one hundred feet by sixty feet and designed to stand atop Walnut Hill. With three finished stories built in an Italianate style with red brick and sandstone trimmings. The whole building is crowned with a bracketed cornice and balustrade. The main entrance of the building is arched and enclosed by a Roman Ionic Portico, surmounted by another balustrade. The height was extended with the addition of six paneled brick chimneys which rose above a slate roof. Overall the building was designed to be seen for miles past campus. Hidden behind the balustrade was a cast-iron college bell used to call students and faculty to lectures and chapel services. The building is surrounded by sandstone course belts and features rusticated corner quoins. During the late 19th century, subsequent renovations changed the appearance of the building, until McKim, Mead, and White reverted the building to its original appearance in 1955–56. During the renovation the building was gutted and new steel-reinforced walls and floors were inserted. The last classes held in the building were in Spring of 1955.

== History ==
Originally known as College Building, College Hall, or the College Edifice, the building was conceived initially during the late 1840s by the founders of Tufts. It was not until July 21, 1852 when sufficient funds were raised and land was located that formal construction could begin. The Board of Trustees even voted to create a building committee and instructed the body to devise a master plan for the College buildings. The building cost $38,000 to construct. Construction commenced under the direction of Rev. Otis Skinner in November 1852. Winter storms and harsh weather obtruded construction but ultimately by July 19,1853 a ceremony was held for the corner stone of the new building. Progress on construction was highly documented by the "Trumpet and Universalist Magazine." The walls and roof were completed by November and the interior was finished in 1854. The building was renamed Ballou Hall by the Trustees in 1892.

Since construction, the interior has been renovated and rearranged on several occasions. Originally, in addition to recitation rooms, the building contained dormitories, bathing accommodations, a chapel, library, and two common rooms. The configuration remained so for several years in referencing the physical plans of the first English universities. The top floor originally held student dormitories and later held a mineral museum, classrooms, a library and the literary societies the Mathetican Society and the Zetagathean, which formed in the building. The building housed the college library until it was dispersed to Middle Hall, now Packard Hall, and then moved to Eaton Library. The second floor was intended to be the main floor with a broad stairway reaching it from the south façade. Since its existence, the second floor has been the administrative core of the university. On the ground floor was the "Large Chapel." When the chapel was moved to Goddard, the space was enlarged and became classrooms. Also present was a recitation room and the president's office. The cellar of the building eventually became laboratory space used by the new departments of engineering.

== Images ==
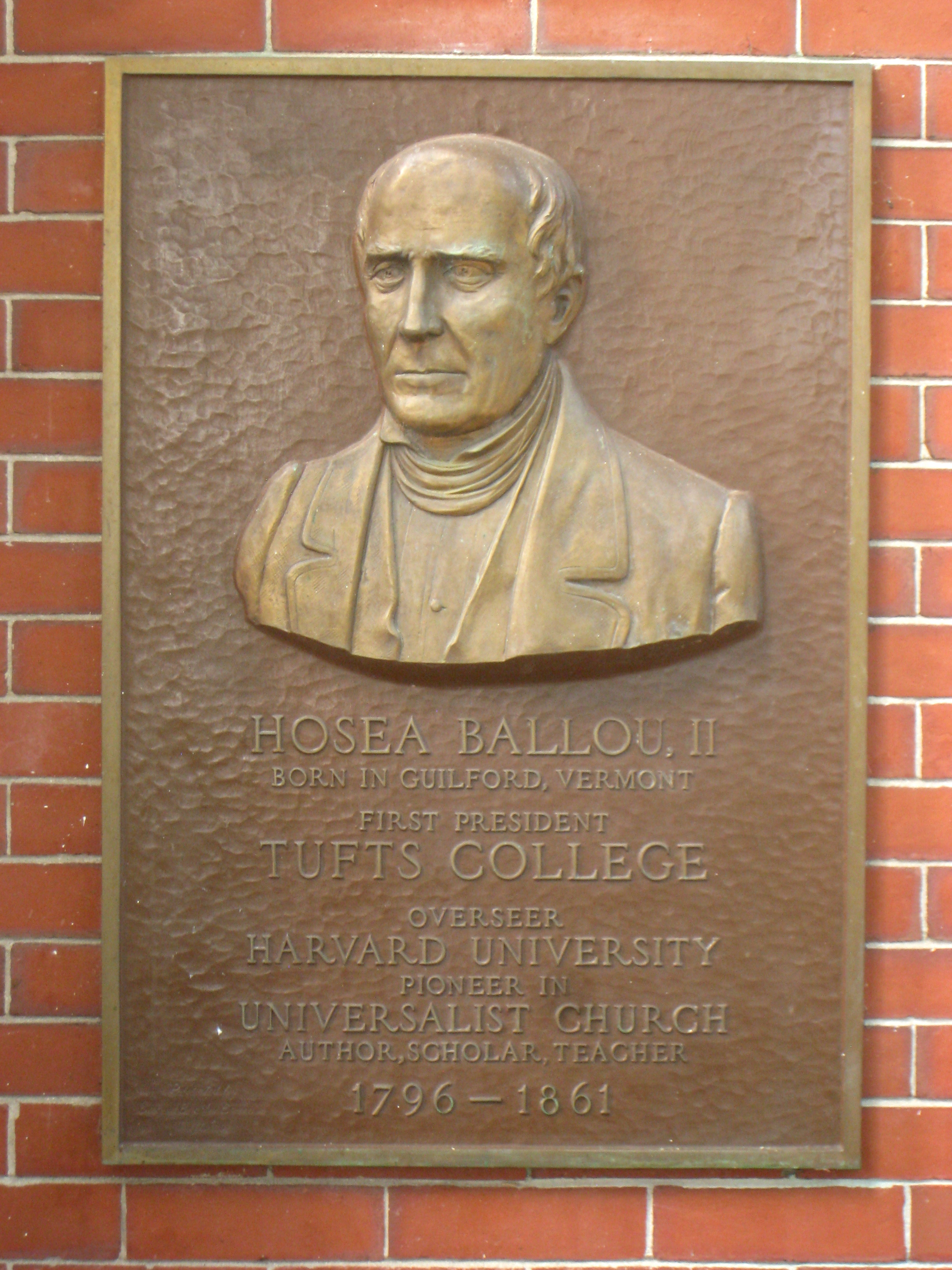
Plaque of Hosea Ballou II on the building

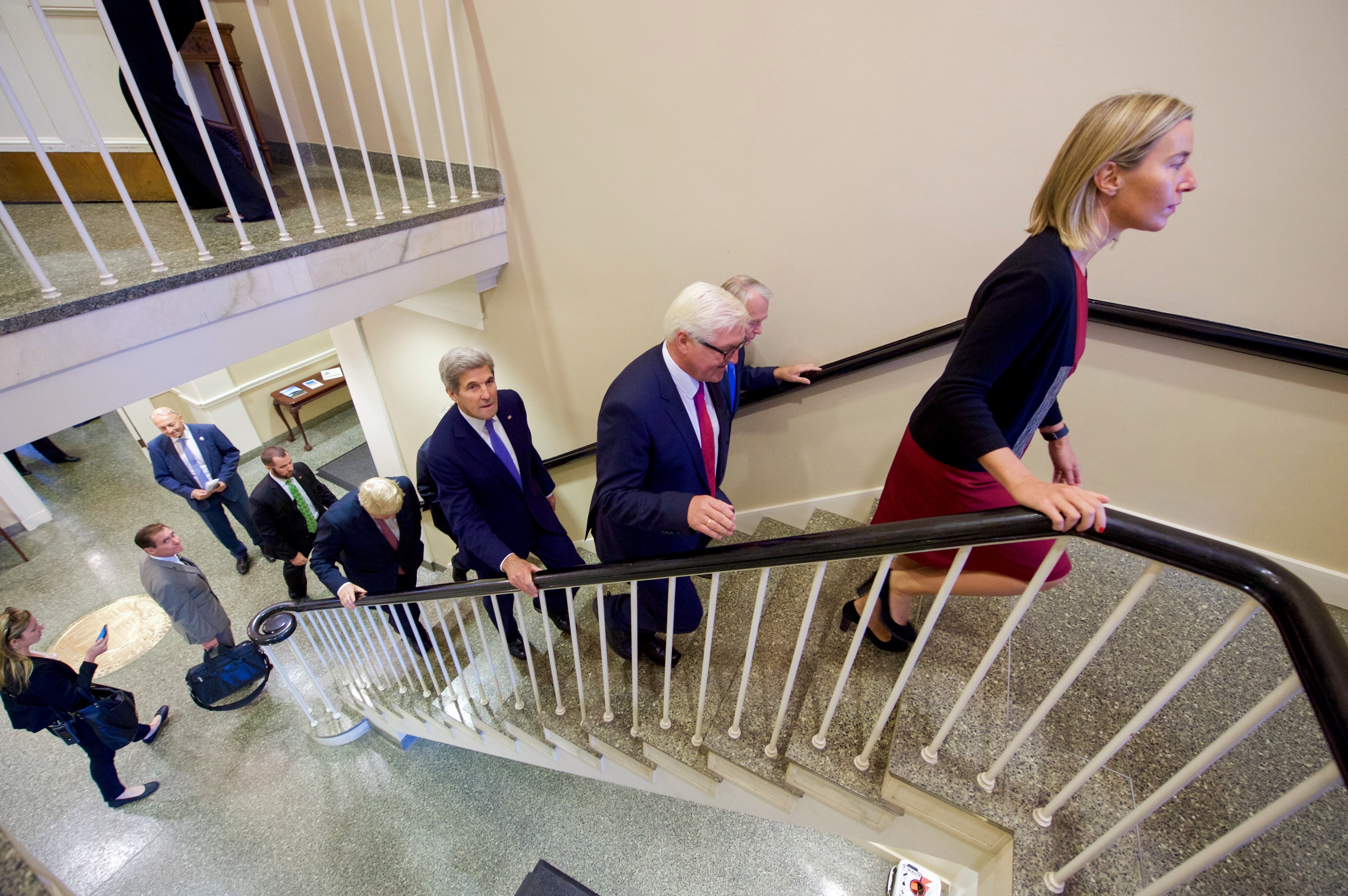
Secretary of State John Kerry climbs up the stairs of the building

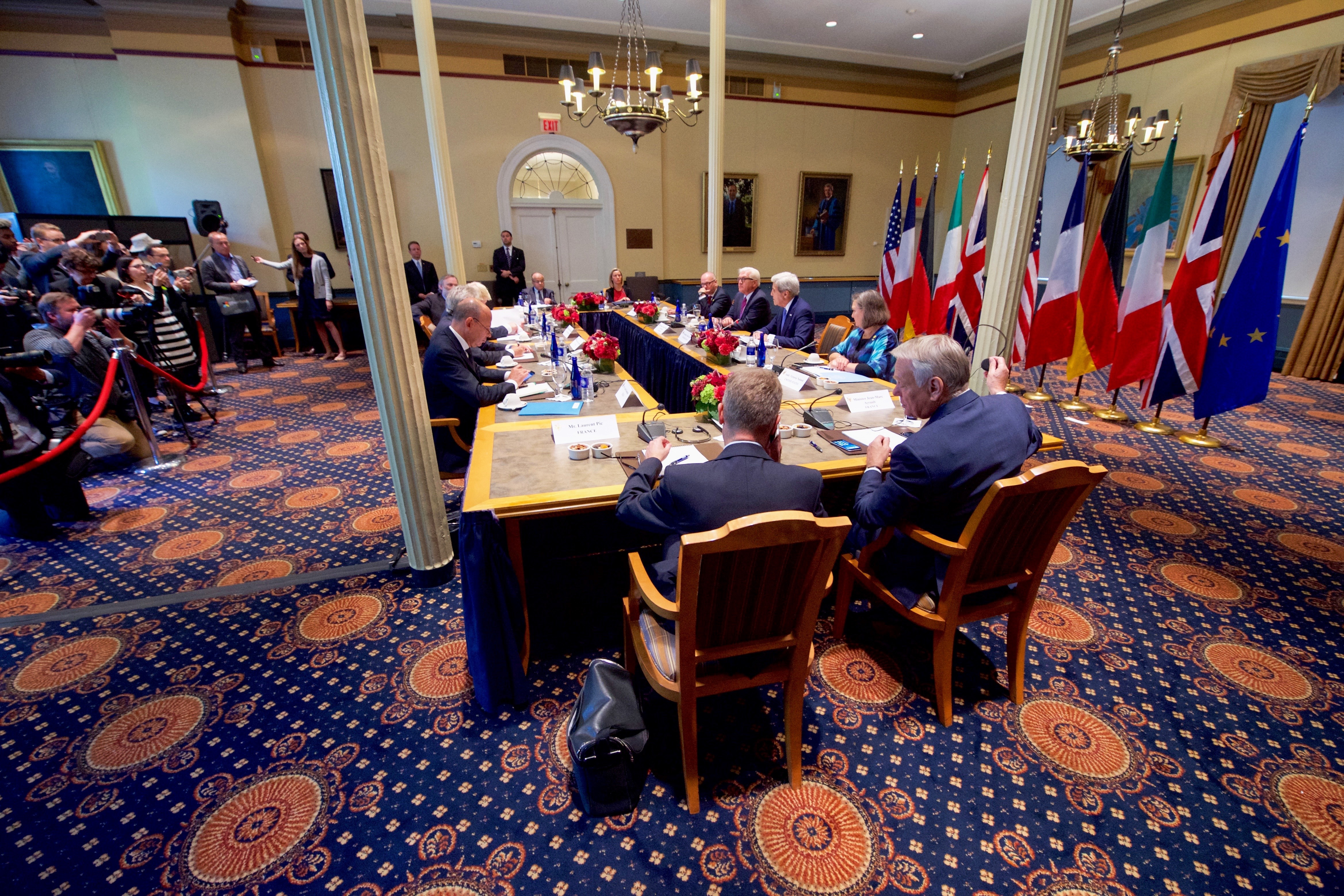
Secretary of State John Kerry meets with the Quintet in Ballou's legislative hall

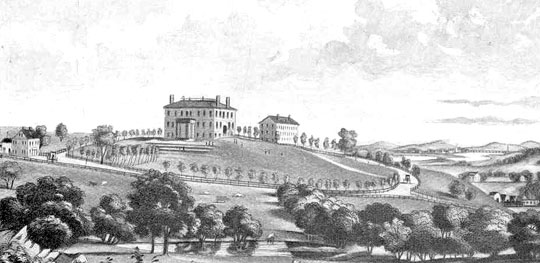
Ballou Hall in 1853

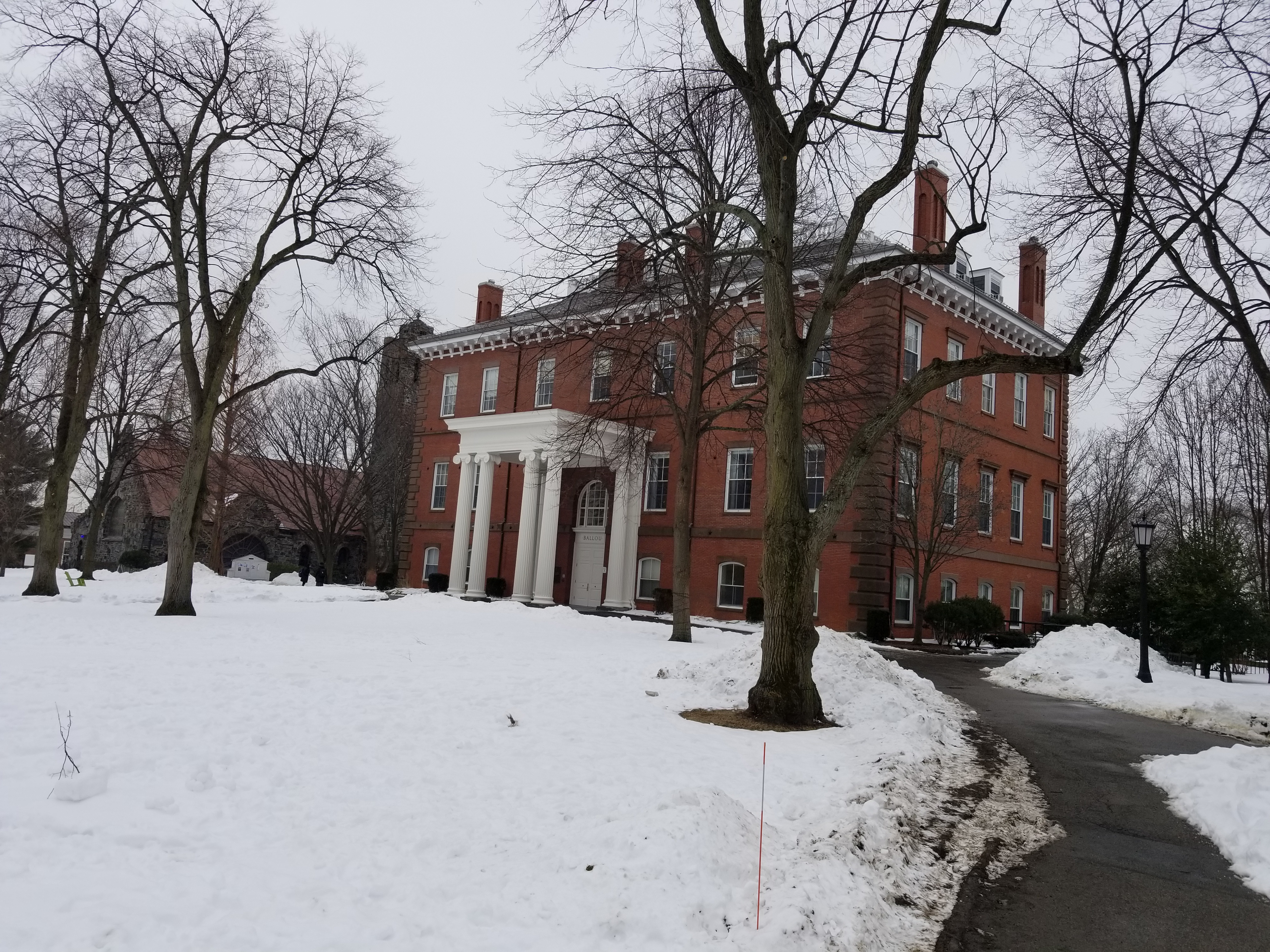
Ballou Hall in 2022
