= Walnut Hill, Medford, Massachusetts =

Hill in Medford, Massachusetts

Coordinates: 42°24′33.0″N 71°7′21.5″W

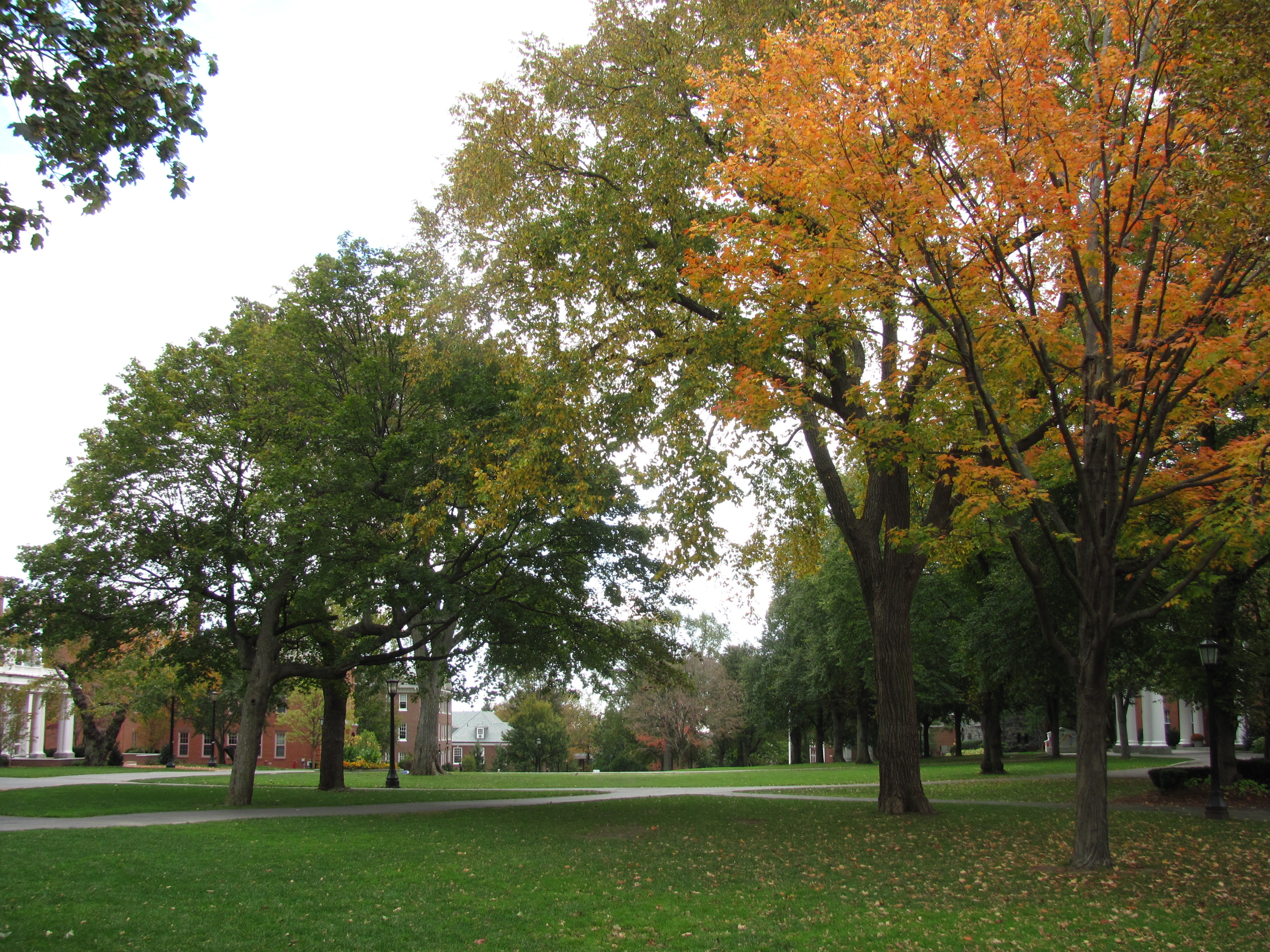
The Green Tufts University

Walnut Hill, located in Medford, Massachusetts, United States, is the geographical home of Tufts University. Walnut Hill itself later became known as College Hill due to the dominant presence of the University.
