= UCCP =

UCCP is an abbreviation, and can refer to the following:

- United Church of Christ in the Philippines
- Original name for University College of Citizenship and Public Service, currently Jonathan M. Tisch College of Citizenship and Public Service
- Unified Conference Control Protocol (UCCP) is a web-based protocol.
