= Lonnie Carton =

American psychologist

- Born: August 25, 1930 (age 95); Baltimore, Maryland, United States
- Education: Pennsylvania State University

Lonnie Carton (born August 25, 1930) is a family therapist and an educational consultant best known for "The Learning Center", a long-running daily feature on CBS Radio which provided strategies for successful parenting.

== Biography ==
Carton was born in Baltimore on August 25, 1930. She grew up in Baltimore and attended Johns Hopkins University, getting her bachelor's degree in 1950. She later received a PhD from Pennsylvania State University in 1959.

She served as a professor of educational psychology at Tufts University.

Carton also serves as a member of the Anheuser-Busch "Family Talk About Drinking" Advisory Panel and the host of the popular "Family Talk about Drinking" Video.

== Publications ==
The Learning Center was taped in Boston, where it was heard over station WEEI. By the early 1990s, her show moved over to WBZ Radio.

Carton's book No is a love word covers when parents should and should not say no to their children.

Carton's CD "Parenting Preschoolers from the Park Bench" is an audio guide that claims to offer strategies for parents who want to learn how to raise physically, socially, and emotionally healthy children.

Carton began a blog in 2009, transitioning her news-media and print work online to guide parents and children through the growing years and reinforce positive parent-child relationships.

== Awards ==
Carton has received the National Media Award of the American Psychological Association in recognition of "her outstanding contributions to the advancement of psychology as a science, profession and means of promoting human welfare".
