= The Cannon (Tufts University) =

Replica cannon in Massachusetts, US

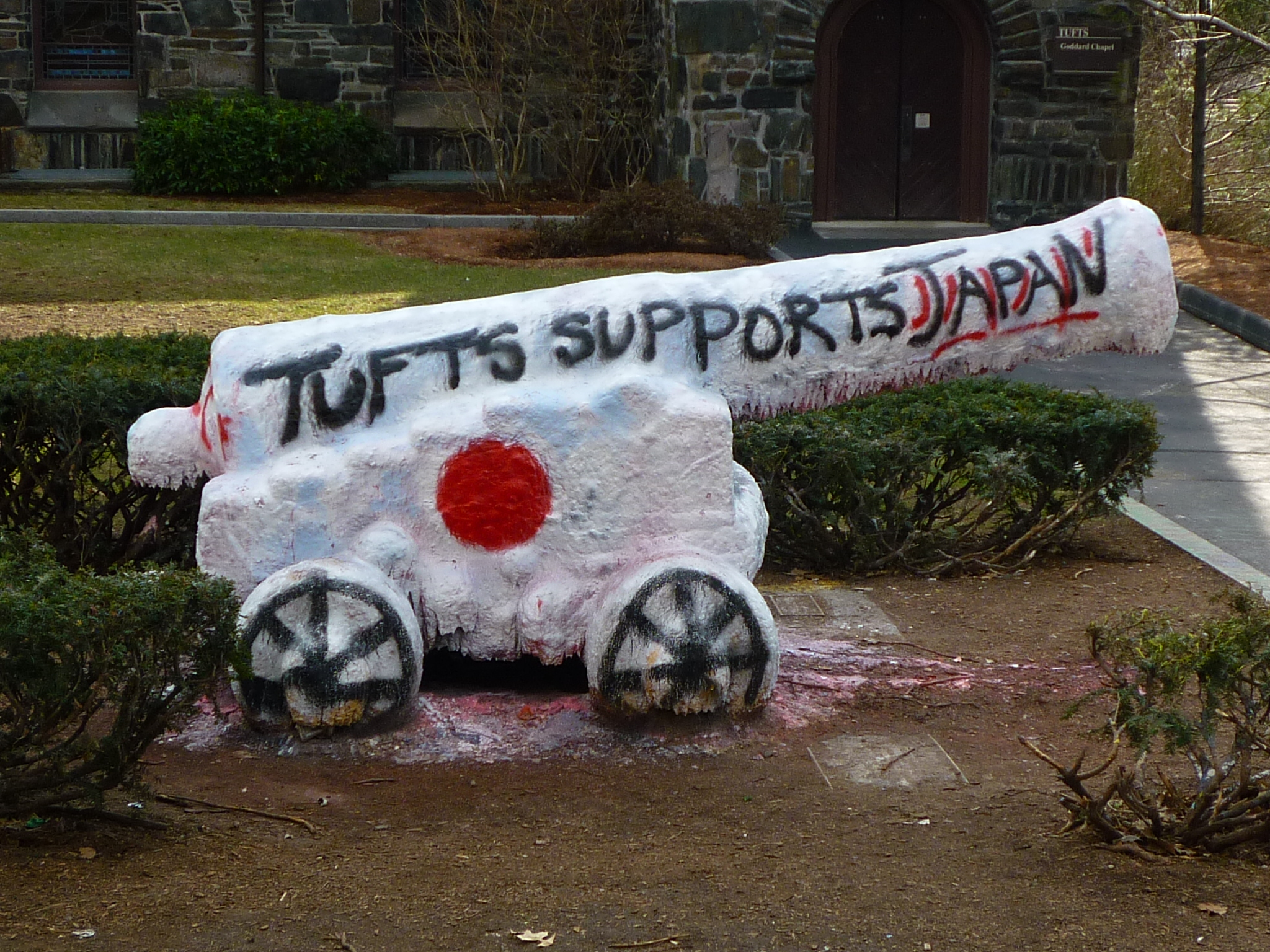
The Tufts cannon, repainted almost nightly during the academic year, is here painted in response to the earthquake and tsunami in Japan.

The Cannon is a replica of a cannon from USS Constitution on the campus of Tufts University in Medford, Massachusetts, located between Goddard Chapel and Ballou Hall. It serves as a billboard for campus activities and groups and has been utilized as the basis for social and political campus movements.

== History ==
The cannon is a replica of a 24-pound cannon from USS Constitution. It was donated to the City of Medford Historical Society by the National Park Service in return for a community effort to raise money to restore the famous warship. Having no place to put it, Medford then gifted it to Tufts University in 1956, where it was placed on campus, on a small patch of grass between Goddard Chapel and Ballou Hall. The cannon remained on campus until the mid-1960s, when it was removed for repairs and maintenance. It was not immediately replaced due to strong sentiments on campus against the Vietnam War. Eventually, after the end of the war in 1977, students lobbied for its return. This request was granted, as the cannon was returned to its original location on campus, atop the hill where it stands today.

Soon after it returned, the cannon was painted black in protest of Tufts University's support of the Ferdinand Marcos family, the then ruling family of the Philippines and frequent benefactors of Tufts. The university was scheduled to grant an honorary degree upon first lady Imelda Marcos. This was halted after ongoing unrest, including frequent painting of the cannon, petitions by students and faculty members, and a 1,000-person strong protest during one of the visits by the Marcoses, pressuring the university into breaking off relations. Although many students resented the painting of the cannon, considering it an act of vandalism, the activity cemented itself as an ongoing student tradition.

Since these protests, students have been painting the cannon almost nightly. Because of this, the cannon was sandblasted in 1985 and 1996 to remove the numerous coats of paint it had accumulated. Also, due to poor documentation upon its transfer to the campus, many students believed it was an actual cannon and not a replica, but these theories were dispelled in 1987 when part of the cannon broke off while it was being moved by maintenance.

== Appearance ==
The cannon is a replica of a 24-pounder long gun, an approximately 8-foot (2.4 m) long barrel mounted on wooden wheels. It is frequently covered in many layers of paint, so none of the original colors of the cannon are discernible. Due to the amount of paint, it is no longer mobile and requires machinery to be moved. It can often be found with varying graffiti, including words and designs, advertisements, messages, and other announcements. On occasion, when offensive paintings or obscenities are added, the cannon has been painted by Tufts administration.

== Painting the Cannon ==
The act of painting the cannon has evolved into a ritual for Tufts students. It involves a set of strict rules that must be followed to preserve the tradition. The cannon is typically painted only after sunset. Due to the competitiveness surrounding its painting, students camp out until sunrise to prevent other students from painting over their work. The cannon has been used to send personal messages, such as birthday wishes and congratulations. The cannon has been painted to commemorate/protest many national events, such as the September 11th Attacks and the Black Lives Matter movement, and to influence Tufts' administration.
