= Tufts University Graduate School of Biomedical Sciences =

Coordinates: 42°21′0.4″N 71°3′44.1″W

- Established: 1980
- Parent institution: Tufts University
- Dean: Dan Jay, Ph.D.
- Academic staff: 200
- Students: 220
- Location: Boston, Massachusetts, United States
- Website: gsbs.tufts.edu

The Graduate School of Biomedical Sciences is one of the eight schools that comprise Tufts University. The Graduate School of Biomedical Sciences (GSBS) is located on the university's health sciences campus in the Chinatown district of Boston, Massachusetts. The school was previously named the Sackler School of Graduate Biomedical Sciences but on December 5, 2019, the university announced it was removing the Sackler name from the school, because of the Sacklers' role in the opioid epidemic through their ownership of Purdue Pharma.

== Organization and Degree Programs ==
The Basic Science Division of the school offers PhD degrees in eight disciplines: Biochemistry; Cell, Molecular and Developmental Biology; Cellular and Molecular Physiology; Genetics; Immunology; Molecular Microbiology, Neuroscience; and Pharmacology and Experimental Therapeutics. The Clinical Research Division offers MS and PhD programs in Clinical Research. These programs also are available to students in the MD/PhD and DVM/PhD programs.

The Clinical and Translational Research program offers MS and PhD degrees. There is also a program offering a one-year certificate in clinical and translational research.

The Pharmacology and Drug Development program offers MS degrees.

Research institutes at the school include the Molecular Oncology Research Institute, Molecular Cardiology Research Institute, Mother Infant Research Institute, Tufts Clinical and Translational Science Institute, and Jean Mayer USDA Human Nutrition Research Center on Aging.

== Facilities ==
The Tufts University School of Medicine (TUSM) and the Graduate School of Biomedical Sciences (GSBS) are located in five adjoining research buildings along Boston's Harrison Avenue and a teaching and administrative building, the Tufts Center for Medical Education (formerly the Arthur M. Sackler Center for Medical Education). The newest addition is the $65 million, nine-story, Jaharis Family Center for Biomedical and Nutrition Sciences. The Jaharis Family Center provides research laboratories and offices for many GSBS faculty members and their students, postdoctoral fellows and technical staff. The building also includes offices and laboratory facilities for the Gerald J. and Dorothy R. Friedman School of Nutrition Science and Policy and the Department of Family and Community Medicine in TUSM. TUSM and the GSBS are adjacent to the Tufts Medical Center, the School of Dental Medicine, and Gerald J. and Dorothy R. Friedman School of Nutrition Science and Policy, and across the street from the Jean Mayer USDA Human Nutrition Research Center on Aging.

== History ==
The Graduate School of Biomedical Sciences was established in 1980 as part of then-Tufts University President Jean Mayer's vision of a "one medicine" approach to the health sciences. The school grew out of gifts from Dr. Arthur M. Sackler, Dr. Mortimer D. Sackler, and Dr. Raymond R. Sackler. Mayer intended the new school to coordinate basic science research and training initiatives in the Schools of Medicine, Dental Medicine, Veterinary Medicine, and the Graduate School of Arts and Sciences.

== See also ==
- Tufts University School of Medicine
