= The Edward R. Murrow Forum on Issues in Journalism =

Annual event

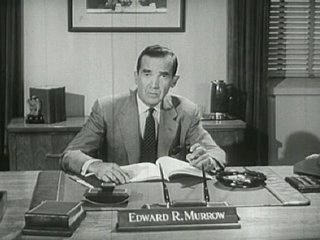
Murrow delivers Cold War broadcast, 1961

The Edward R. Murrow Forum on Issues in Journalism is an annual event held at Tufts University. It is sponsored by the Film and Media Studies Program (FMS) at Tufts University, the Edward R. Murrow Center for the Advancement of Public Diplomacy, and the Jonathan M. Tisch College of Citizenship and Public Service. Dedicated to illuminating aspects of the many contributions Edward R. Murrow made to journalism and public diplomacy, the Forum brings together interdisciplinary panels to reflect on Murrow’s legacy and relate it to contemporary issues in journalism. The Forum debuted in 2006 with former Nightline host Ted Koppel serving as the keynote speaker and moderator examining the contemporary state of the news business. In 2007 retired CBS News anchor Dan Rather led a panel discussing the coverage of war and conflicts. In 2008 former NBC Nightly News anchor Tom Brokaw and panelists explored the current state of political coverage. The 2009 panel was headlined by MSNBC’s Hardball host Chris Matthews, along with former Massachusetts Governor and 1988 Democratic presidential candidate Michael S. Dukakis, and Janet Wu, WCVB-TV’s political reporter discussing the press’ role in encouraging or discouraging people from seeking public office. In 2010 panelists Casey Murrow, author Lynne Olson, and producer/Massachusetts ACLU Vice President Arnie Reisman discussed Murrow and his efforts to bring down Senator Joseph McCarthy after the blacklist and the contemporary state of blacklisting, self-censorship, and political redlines for the media. In 2011 panelists Katie Couric and Jonathan Tisch discussed Couric's career as well as the state of journalism in a social media and technology-driven world. In 2012 panelists Brian Williams and Jonathan Tisch discussed Williams's career and tactics, opportunities, and challenges of covering campaigns in 2012. The 2013 forum featured Christiane Amanpour discussing the evolving role of foreign correspondents, while Huffington Post founder Arianna Huffington examined the changing face of journalism in the digital age for the 2014 forum. In 2015, ABC News' Chief Anchor George Stephanopoulos discussed reliability in the 24-hour news cycle.

== Forum Themes and Panelists ==
=== 2024 ===
- Chris Hayes, MSNBC host of All In with Chris Hayes
- Neal Shapiro, president and CEO of WNET

=== 2023 ===
- Abby Phillip, CNN reporter

=== 2018 ===
Panelists:

- Katy Tur, News Anchor, MSNBC Live
- Neal Shapiro, Former President, NBC News

=== 2017 "Media in a New Age: Fake News, Alternative Facts, and What’s Next" ===
Panelists:

- Lester Holt, News Anchor, NBC Nightly News
- Jonathan Tisch, Co-Chairman of the Board of Loews Corporation

=== 2016 "Contemporary Media Issues" ===
Panelists:

- Anderson Cooper, News Anchor, CNN
- Jonathan Tisch, Co-Chairman of the Board of Loews Corporation

=== 2015 "Who Do You Believe in the 24/7, Multi-Platform World of News?" ===
Panelists:

- George Stephanopoulos, Chief Anchor, ABC News
- Jonathan Tisch, Co-Chairman of the Board of Loews Corporation

=== 2014 "'From TV to Tablet: Is the Digital Frontier Making Journalism Better?" ===
Panelists:

- Arianna Huffington, Chair, President and Editor-In-Chief of the Huffington Post.
- Jonathan Tisch, Co-Chairman of the Board of Loews Corporation

=== 2013 "'This Is London': The Evolving Role of the Foreign Correspondent" ===
Panelists:

- Christiane Amanpour, Chief International Correspondent for CNN, host of CNN International's Amanpour, Global Affairs Anchor for ABC News
- Jonathan Tisch, Co-Chairman of the Board of Loews Corporation

=== 2012 "Covering Campaign 2012: New Tactics, New Opportunities, New Challenges" ===
Panelists:

- Brian Williams, NBC Nightly News
- Jonathan Tisch, Co-Chairman of the Board of Loews Corporation

=== 2011 “Watching the News: Broadcasting, Webcasting, Forecasting” ===
Panelists:

- Katie Couric, CBS Evening News
- Jonathan Tisch, Co-Chairman of the Board of Loews Corporation

=== 2010 “DIXIE CHICKING: Murrow, McCarthy, and the Blacklist — History Lesson or Current Event?” ===
Panelists:

- Casey Murrow, Executive Director, Synergy Learning
- Lynne Olson, author
- Arnie Reisman, producer and screenwriter

=== 2009 “Digging Too Deeply? Headlines, Politics, and Public Service” ===
Panelists:

- Chris Matthews, MSNBC, Host of Hardball with Chris Matthews
- Michael S. Dukakis, Former Massachusetts Governor, 1988 Democratic Party candidate for President
- Janet Wu, Political Reporter, WCVB-TV

=== 2008 “Noise vs. News: The State of Political Coverage” ===
Panelists:

- Tom Brokaw, Special Correspondent, NBC News
- Matt Bai, Political Reporter, The New York Times Magazine
- Eric Fehrnstrom, Senior Communications Advisor to former Massachusetts Governor Mitt Romney
- Peggy Noonan, Columnist, The Wall Street Journal

=== 2007 “What Would Murrow See Now? How the Press Covers War and Conflict” ===
Panelists:

- Dan Rather, Global Correspondent, Dan Rather Reports, HDNet
- Kimberly Abbott, Media Adviser for North America, International Crisis Group
- Dave Marash, Anchor, Al Jazeera English
- Charles Sennott, Staff Writer, Special Projects Team, The Boston Globe
- Commander Joseph “Cappy” Surette, APR, Public Affairs Officer, U.S. European

Command Liaison Office

=== 2006 “What Would Murrow See Now? The U.S. Press and the World” ===
Panelists:

- Ted Koppel, Managing Editor, Discovery Channel
- Louise Lief, Deputy Director, International Reporting Project, Johns Hopkins University
- Keith Richburg, Foreign Editor, The Washington Post
- Neal Shapiro, Former President, NBC News
- Crocker Snow, Director, Murrow Center, Fletcher School of Law and Diplomacy
