= Tufts University =

Private university in Medford and Somerville, Massachusetts, U.S.

- Latin: Universitas Tuftensis
- Former name: Tufts College (1852–1954)
- Motto: Pax et Lux (Latin)
- Motto in English: "Peace and Light"
- Type: Private research university
- Established: 1852; 174 years ago
- Accreditation: NECHE
- Academic affiliations: AAU; NAICU; UArctic; URA; Space-grant
- Endowment: $2.71 billion (2025)
- President: Sunil Kumar
- Provost: Joseph Auner (interim)
- Faculty: 765 full-time, 457 part-time
- Students: 13,599 (fall 2024)
- Undergraduates: 7,126 (fall 2024)
- Postgraduates: 6,473 (fall 2024)
- Location: Medford and Somerville, Massachusetts, United States; 42.406°N 71.120°W
- Campus: 150 acres (0.61 km^{2}); Large suburb
- Other campuses: Boston; Grafton; Talloires, France
- Newspaper: The Tufts Daily
- Colors: Tufts Blue; Brown
- Nickname: Jumbos
- Sporting affiliations: NCAA Division III – NESCAC; NEISA
- Mascot: Jumbo the Elephant
- Website: tufts.edu

Tufts University is a private research university in Medford and Somerville, Massachusetts, United States, with additional facilities in Boston and Grafton, as well as Talloires, France. It was founded in 1852 as Tufts College by Christian universalists who sought to provide a nonsectarian institution of higher learning. For much of the 20th century, Jackson College for Women was the coordinate college of Tufts. Tufts remained a small liberal arts college until the 1970s, when it became a larger research university offering doctorates in several disciplines. The corporate name of the university is "Trustees of Tufts College".

Tufts enrolls over 13,000 students. It offers over 90 undergraduate and 160 graduate programs across ten schools in the greater Boston area and from a campus in France. It has the country's oldest graduate school of international relations, the Fletcher School of Law and Diplomacy. The largest school is the School of Arts and Sciences, which includes both the Graduate School of Arts and Sciences and the School of the Museum of Fine Arts at Tufts University, which is affiliated with the Museum of Fine Arts, Boston. The School of Engineering offers an entrepreneurial focus through its Gordon Institute. It is classified among "R1: Doctoral Universities – Very high research activity" and is a member of the Association of American Universities.

Tufts has a campus in Downtown Boston that houses the medical, dental, and nutrition schools and the Graduate School of Biomedical Sciences, affiliated with several medical centers in the area. Joint undergraduate degree programs are offered with the College of Europe and Sciences Po Paris.

== History ==
=== 19th century ===
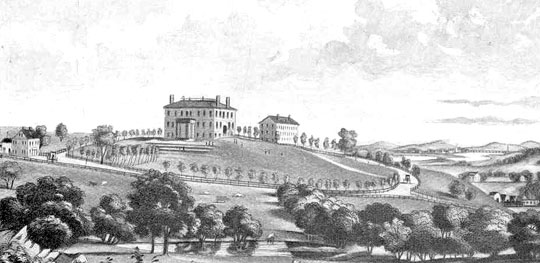
Tufts College, c. 1854

In the 1840s, the Universalist Church wanted to open a college in New England, and Charles Tufts donated 20 acres to the church in 1852 to help them achieve this goal. Charles Tufts had inherited the land, a barren hill which was one of the highest points in the Boston area, called Walnut Hill, and when asked by a family member what he intended to do with the land, he said "I will put a light on it." His 20-acre donation (then valued at $20,000) is still at the heart of Tufts' now-150-acre campus, straddling Somerville and Medford. It was also in 1852 that the Commonwealth of Massachusetts chartered Tufts College, noting the college should promote "virtue and piety and learning in such of the languages and liberal and useful arts as shall be recommended." During his tenure, Hosea Ballou spent a year travelling and studying in the United Kingdom. The methods of instruction which he initiated were based on the tutorials that were conducted in the University of Oxford and the University of Edinburgh. Now more than 170 years old, Tufts is the third-oldest college in the Boston area.

Having been one of the biggest influences in the establishment of the college, Hosea Ballou II became the first president in 1853, and College Hall, the first building on campus, was completed the following year. That building now bears Ballou's name. The campus opened in August 1854. President Ballou died in 1861 and was succeeded by Alonzo Ames Miner. Though not a college graduate, his presidency was marked by several advances. These include the establishment of preparatory schools for Tufts which include Goddard Seminary, Westbrook Seminary, and Dean Academy. During the Civil War the college actively supported the Union cause. The mansion of Major George L. Stearns which stood on part of the campus was a station on the Underground Railroad. In addition to having the largest classes spring up, 63 graduates served in the Union army. The first course of a three-year program leading to a degree in civil engineering was established in 1865, the same year MIT was founded. By 1869, the Crane Theological School was organized.

Miner's successor Elmer Capen was the first president to be a Tufts alumnus. During his time, one of the earliest innovators was Amos Dolbear. In 1875, as chair of the physics department, he installed a working telephone which connected his lab in Ballou Hall to his home on Professors Row. Two years later Alexander Graham Bell would receive the patent. Dolbear's work in Tufts was later continued by Marconi and Tesla. Other famous scholars include William Leslie Hooper who in addition to serving as acting president, designed the first slotted armature for dynamos. His student at the college, Frederick Stark Pearson, would eventually become one of America's pioneers of the electrical power industry. He became responsible for the development of the electric power and electric streetcar systems which many cities in South America and Europe used. Another notable figure is Stephen M. Babcock who developed the first practical test to determine the amount of butterfat in milk. Since its development in the college, the Babcock Test has hardly been modified. Expansion of the chemistry and biology departments were largely led by scholars Arthur Michael, who was one of the first organic chemists in the U.S., and John Sterling Kingsley, who was one of the first scholars of comparative anatomy.

P. T. Barnum was one of the earliest benefactors of Tufts College, and the Barnum Museum of Natural History (Barnum Hall) was constructed in 1884 with funds donated by him to house his collection of animal specimens and the stuffed hide of Jumbo the elephant, who would become the university's mascot. The building stood until April 14, 1975, when a fire gutted Barnum Hall, destroying the entire collection.

On July 15, 1892, the Tufts Board of Trustees voted "that the College be opened to women in the undergraduate departments on the same terms and conditions as men." Metcalf Hall opened in 1893 and served as the dormitory for women. At the same meeting, the trustees voted to create a graduate school faculty and to offer the PhD degree in biology and chemistry. In 1893 the Medical School opened and in 1899 the Boston Dental College was integrated into the university. In 1890, the Department of Electrical Engineering was created, and in 1892–1893 the course of three-year program in civil engineering was extended to four years. With the advent of the four-year program the degrees granted were bachelor of civil or electrical engineering. Tufts College added the Department of Mechanical Engineering and the Department of Chemical Engineering in 1894 and 1898, respectively. In 1898, the trustees voted to formally establish an undergraduate College of Engineering.

=== 20th century ===
African American students, many from Medford, began attending Tufts in the 1870s. The first known Black graduate was Forrester Blanchard Washington, a native of Salem, who graduated in 1909. In 1919, Jessie Katherine Gideon Garnett was the first Black woman to graduate from the School of Dental Medicine; she was the sole woman and Black student in her class.

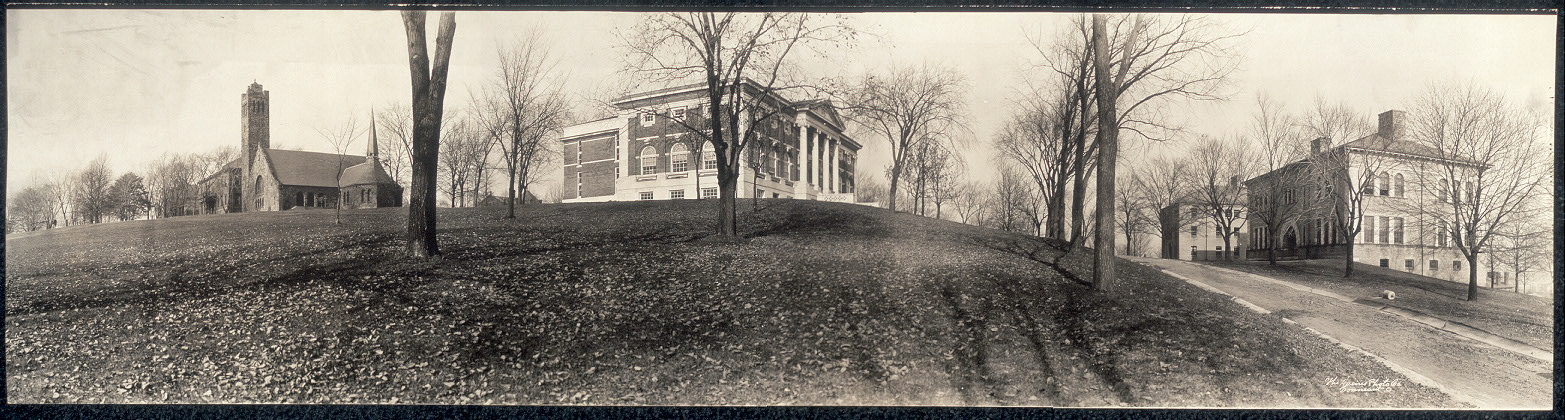
Walnut Hill as it appeared prior to the construction of Tisch Library and steps, circa 1910. In the center is Eaton Hall. The road to the right no longer exists.

The Jackson College for Women was established in 1910 as a coordinate college on the Tufts campus, in part because there was a feeling that men would not want to attend a Tufts College where women were a large-scale presence. The Jackson College and the Tufts College of Liberal Arts shared the same courses and faculty, but for much of its existence, Jackson College had its own student activities and student government, separate from that of Tufts, and its own dean. It was a prestigious women's college at its peak; in comparison to the Tufts undergraduate schools that men attended, Jackson College was considered harder to get admitted to and to have an academically stronger group of matriculants. Students of this era were very proud of being associated with Jackson and felt identity with, and loyalty to, the Jackson name. Over time, things changed, and female students felt more of a belonging to Tufts University itself. In 1980, Jackson College was integrated with the College of Liberal Arts but was still recognized in the formal name of the undergraduate arts and sciences division, the College of Liberal Arts and Jackson College. Undergraduate women in arts and sciences continued to receive their diplomas from Jackson College until 2002.

Tufts expanded in 1933 with the opening of the Fletcher School of Law and Diplomacy, the first graduate school of international affairs in the United States. The Fletcher School began as a joint effort between Tufts and Harvard University, funded by an endowment from longtime Tufts benefactor and alumnus Austin Barclay Fletcher. Tufts assumed full administration of the Fletcher School in 1935, and strong linkages between the two schools remain.

During World War II, Tufts College was one of 131 colleges and universities nationally that took part in the V-12 Navy College Training Program which offered students a path to a Navy commission.

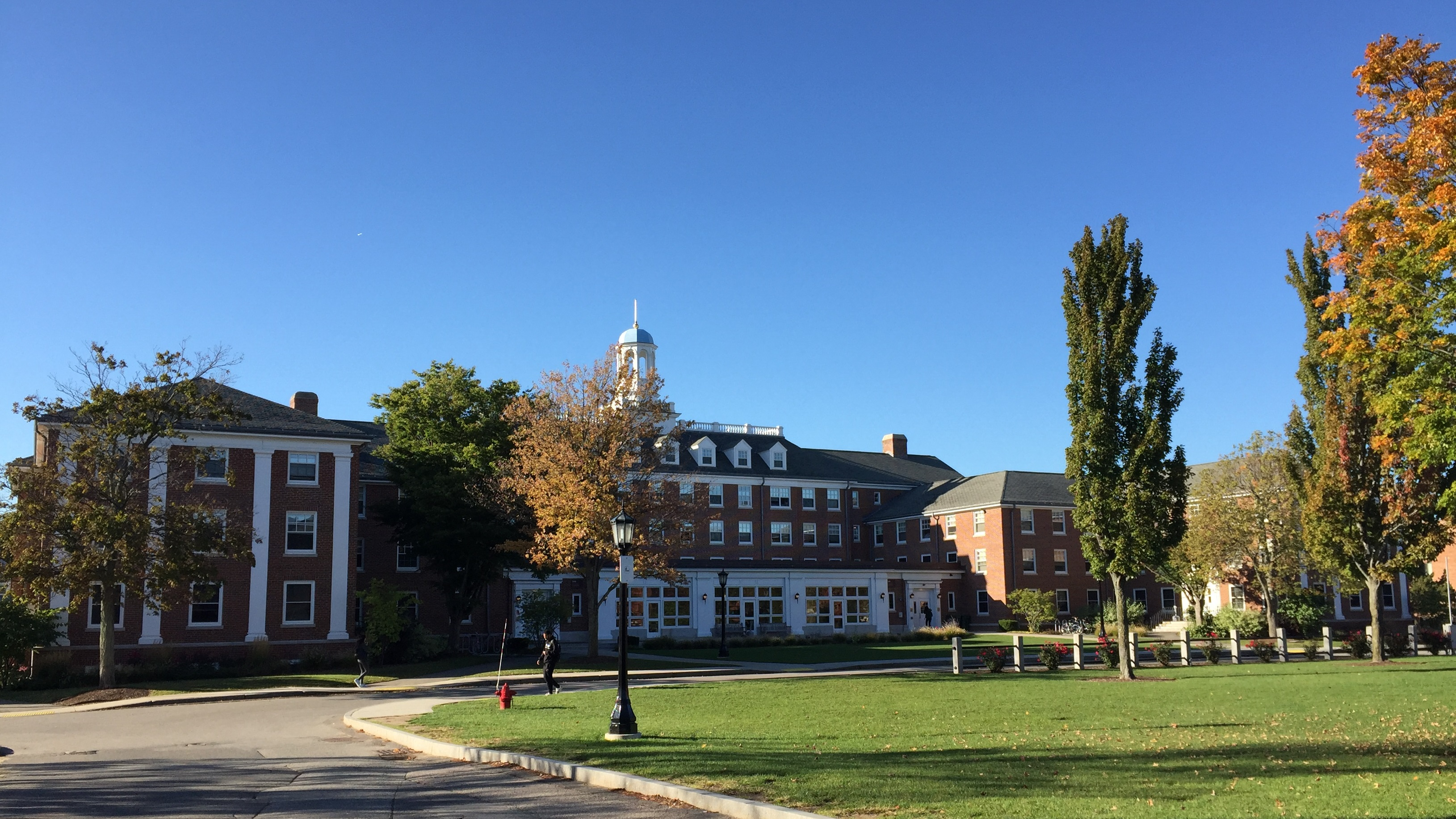
Carmichael Hall on the Rez Quad

Due to travel restrictions imposed by World War II, the Boston Red Sox conducted spring training for the 1943 Major League season at Tufts College. In 1955, continued expansion was reflected in the change of the school's name to Tufts University, though the corporate name remains as 'Trustees of Tufts College'.

In 1945, Tufts formed an affiliation with the Boston School of Occupational Therapy, which had been in existence for several decades. The Boston School was officially merged into Tufts in 1960. During the 1980s, its campus moved from Boston to Somerville to Medford, and it became a school within the College of Arts and Sciences. Later it became a department within the Graduate School of Arts and Sciences. Still sometimes referred to as the Tufts University – Boston School of Occupational Therapy, it remains one of the top-ranked occupational therapy programs in the nation.

The university experienced some growth during the presidency of Jean Mayer (1976–1992). Mayer established Tufts' veterinary, nutrition, and biomedical schools and acquired the Grafton and Talloires campuses, at the same time lifting the university out of its dire financial situation by increasing the size of the endowment by a factor of 15.

The College of Engineering added graduate study to its curriculum beginning in 1961, with master's degrees available in four departments. It added PhD programs in mechanical engineering in 1963, electrical engineering in 1964, engineering design in 1981, and civil engineering in 1985. In 1984, CEO and chairman of Analogic Corporation and NeuroLogica Corporation Bernard Marshall Gordon founded the Tufts Gordon Institute as the first educational institution created to foster entrepreneurship in the engineering fields. In 1991 the New England Association of Schools and Colleges accredited the institute to confer the degree of Master of Science in Engineering Management and in 1992 the Gordon Institute became part of the College of Engineering. In 1999, the College of Engineering became the School of Engineering, when oversight of graduate engineering programs was transferred from the Graduate School of Arts and Sciences. As part of the same reorganization the Faculty of Arts and Science became the Faculty of Arts, Sciences, and Engineering (AS&E).

=== 21st century ===
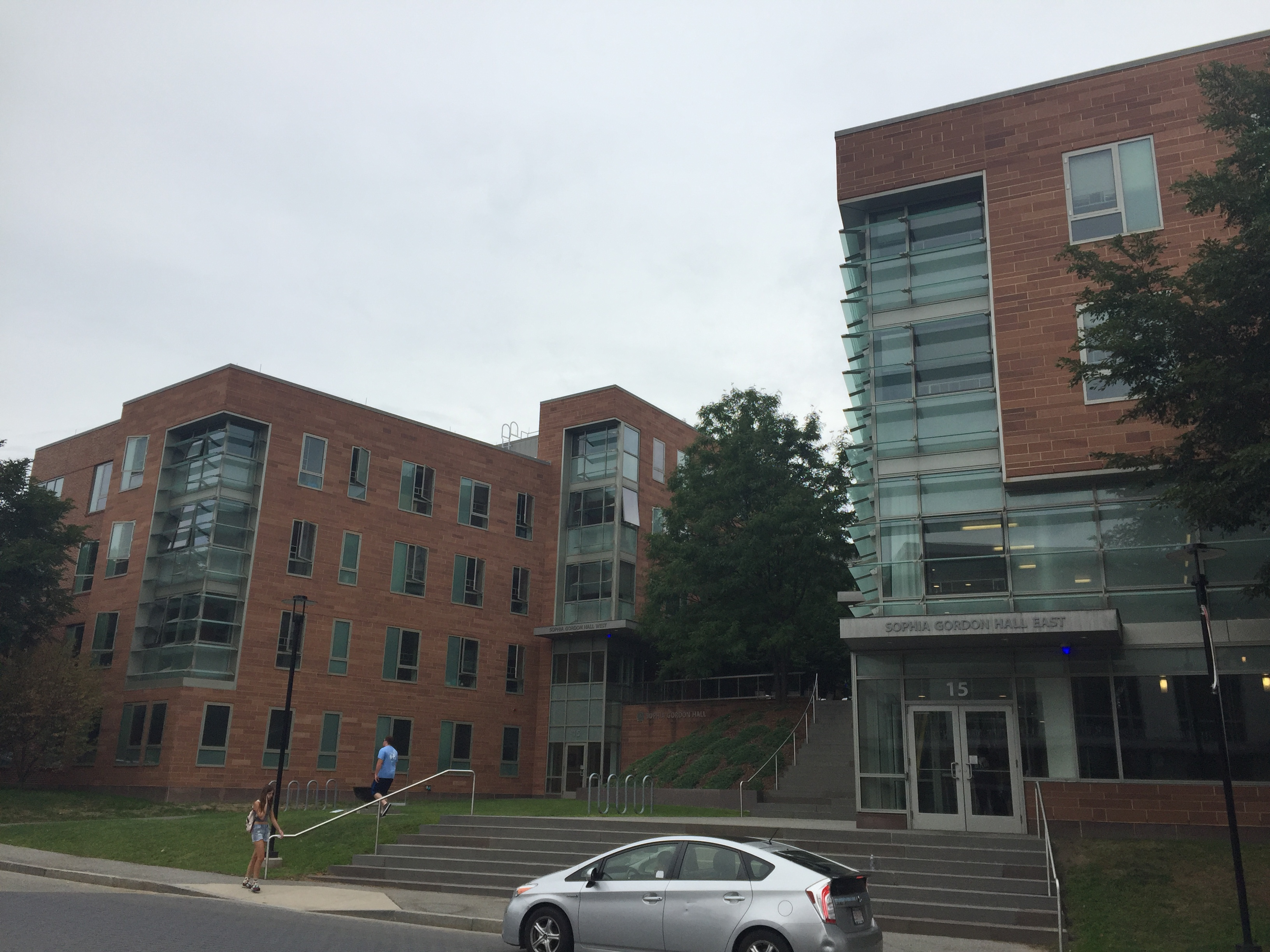
Sophia Gordon Hall (2006) is Tufts' newest residence hall

Under President Larry Bacow, Tufts started a capital campaign in 2006 with the goal of raising $1.2 billion to implement full need-blind admission by 2011. As of December 10, 2010 the campaign raised $1.14 billion. Tufts received the largest donations in its history since 2005, including a $136 million bequest to its endowment upon the dissolution of a charitable trust set up by 1911 alumnus Frank C. Doble, a $100 million (~$147 million in 2025) gift from eBay founder Pierre Omidyar to establish the Omidyar-Tufts Microfinance Fund, and a number of $40 million (~$63.3 million in 2025)-plus gifts to specific schools.

Anthony P. Monaco, formerly of Oxford University, became Tufts' thirteenth president on October 21, 2011.

As of October 15, 2015, Computer Science surpassed International Relations as the largest major at the university, with 466 declared majors.

On December 22, 2015, the university announced that it would acquire the School of the Museum of Fine Arts. The merger was completed on June 30, 2016. One of the key figures in the merger, Nancy Bauer, became the dean of the museum school.

In December 2015, the university completed a reconstruction of the Memorial Stairs. A new Central Energy Plant was under construction and set to finish in the summer of 2016. It will replace an aging 60-year-old plant and provide new efficiency boilers which in addition to providing the university directly with electricity, heated and chilled water, will help the university cut emissions. The university also completed construction of the Science and Engineering Complex (SEC) in 2017. The SEC features laboratories and fosters interdisciplinary research between the neuroscience and environmental science departments. The SEC joins the newly rehabilitated 574 Boston Avenue in the expansion of classroom and laboratory facilities for the engineering school. In the spring of 2022, the university plans to open the newly constructed Joyce Cummings Center, an interdisciplinary academic building which will house the computer science and economics departments, among others.

In 2016, Microsoft co-founder Paul Allen pledged a $10 million (~$13.1 million in 2025) donation over four years for the creation of the Allen Discovery Centers at Tufts and Stanford. The centers would fund research that would read and write the morphogenetic code. Tufts biologist Michael Levin will lead the center with research focusing on communications between cells, and the causation of birth defects, cancer, traumatic injuries and degenerative diseases.

In 2018, Tufts officially launched University College, the division of the university focused on lifelong learning, workforce development, and enrichment for learners at all life stages.

In 2020, Tufts announced that it would pay the MBTA $2 million (~$2.45 million in 2025) over 10 years to rename the adjacent Green Line Extension station from "College Avenue" to "Medford/Tufts." The Medford Branch opened to Medford/Tufts on December 12, 2022.

After twelve years as president, Anthony Monaco retired in 2023. Sunil Kumar, previously the provost of Johns Hopkins University, became the university's 14th president on July 1, 2023.

On April 7, 2024, Tufts students joined other campuses across the United States in protests and setting up encampments in protest against the Gaza war. The protestors demands included disclosure of university investments and divestment from Israel. The encampment ended after a month with Tufts Students for Justice in Palestine (“SJP”) rejecting what it called "a bad-faith deal" offered by the administration. More than 250 members of the graduating class threatened to boycott commencement and called for an end to "Tuft University's financial complicity in the ongoing devastation of Gaza".

In fall 2024, Tufts SJP was suspended through 2027 for "policy violations, which include[d] using images of weapons and urging students to 'escalate' and 'Join the Student Intifada'" in a post on social media.

In September 2025, the university opened the Center for Expanding Viewpoints in Higher Education, which is intended to help support faculty at Tufts and elsewhere in teaching and researching difficult civic and policy issues and to engage community members across cultural and other differences.

In April 2026, Tufts University and its Fletcher School of Law and Diplomacy were designated as undesirable organizations in Russia, a designation that Russia has given to other organizations that oppose Russia's 2022 invasion of Ukraine. The school began to disassociate from Russian institutions following the invasion and Russian authorities claimed that the university and its school were "instruments of anti-Russian propaganda". They also the university's support of LGBTQ communities.

In September 2026, the first undergraduate class admitted as part of the Tufts Tuition Pact matriculated at the university; the pact, first announced the preceding September, affirms that U.S. students whose family income is less than $150,000 per year attend Tufts tuition-free. Students whose families make less than $60,000 per year will receive financial aid offers that do not include loans but students whose families make more may be offered loans to pay for other costs such as housing, food, and books.

== Campuses ==
=== Medford and Somerville ===
Tufts' main campus is located on Walnut Hill in Medford and Somerville, about 5 miles (8.0 km) from Boston on the site of the original farm of Charles Tufts, the university's namesake. This campus houses all undergraduates in Arts & Sciences and Engineering, the graduate programs at The Fletcher School of Law and Diplomacy and all of the graduate programs in Arts & Sciences and Engineering. While the majority of the campus is in Medford, the Somerville line intersects it, placing parts of the lower campus in Somerville and leading to the common terms "Uphill" and "Downhill".

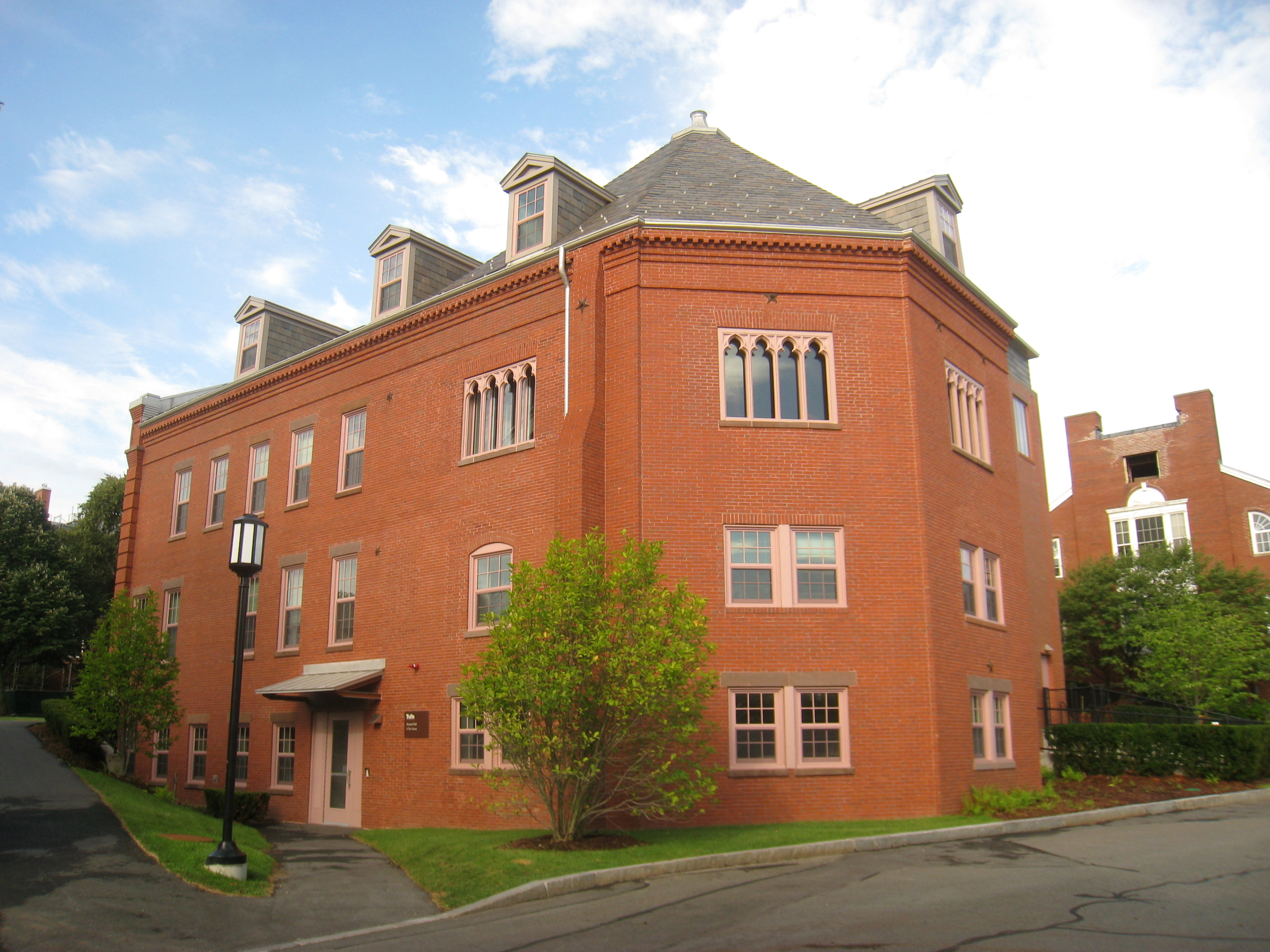
Packard Hall

The "Uphill" portion of the campus comprises the academic and the residential "Rez" quad (built on the former reservoir site) and is enclosed by a wrought-iron fence. Classes that contributed to the building of the fence are commemorated along its length. The academic quad contains the earliest buildings and was primarily built from the middle of the 19th century to the beginning of the 20th century. One of Tufts' first buildings, Ballou Hall was constructed from 1852 to 1854 and was designed in the Italianate style by the well-known Boston architect Gridley James Fox Bryant. Ballou Hall was later restored by McKim, Mead, and White in 1955–56, and houses the offices of the president, the provost, and several vice presidents and deans. Other notable buildings include: Packard Hall (1856), East Hall (1860), West Hall (1871), Goddard Chapel (1882), Goddard Hall (1883), Barnum Hall (1884), and Eaton Hall (1908). The New York firm Whitfield & King was responsible for the design of Eaton Hall.

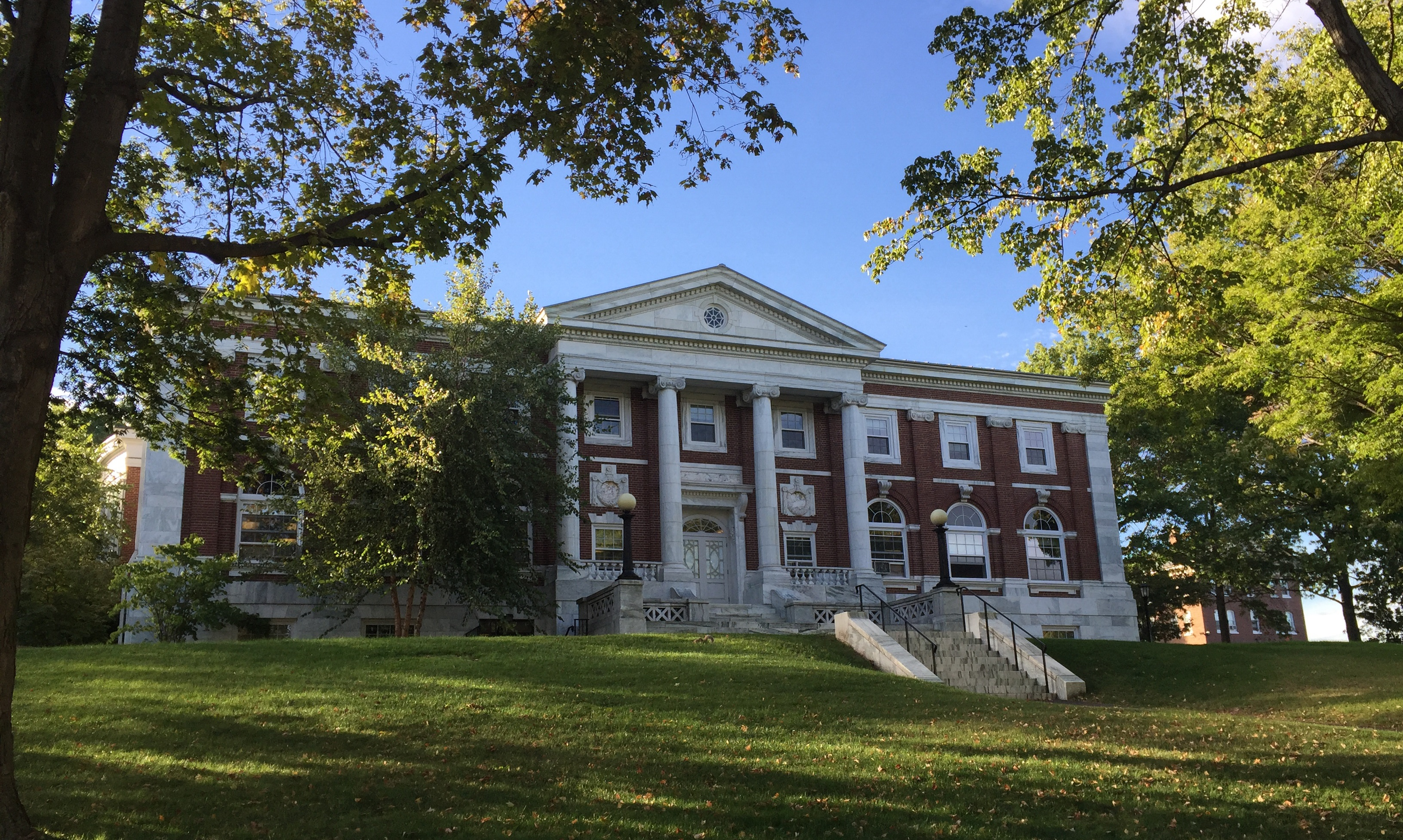
Eaton Hall

The "Uphill" residential quad contains more modern buildings. The most notable building is Carmichael Hall (1954), designed by Arland A. Dirlam. Dirlam also designed Bendetson Hall (1947) on the academic quad. Adjacent to both quads is the Cabot Intercultural Center designed by ARC/Architectural Resources Cambridge, Inc. one of the Fletcher School's buildings. Many points on the hill have noted views of the Boston skyline, particularly the patio on the Tisch Library roof. It has been ranked one of the prettiest college campuses in the United States.

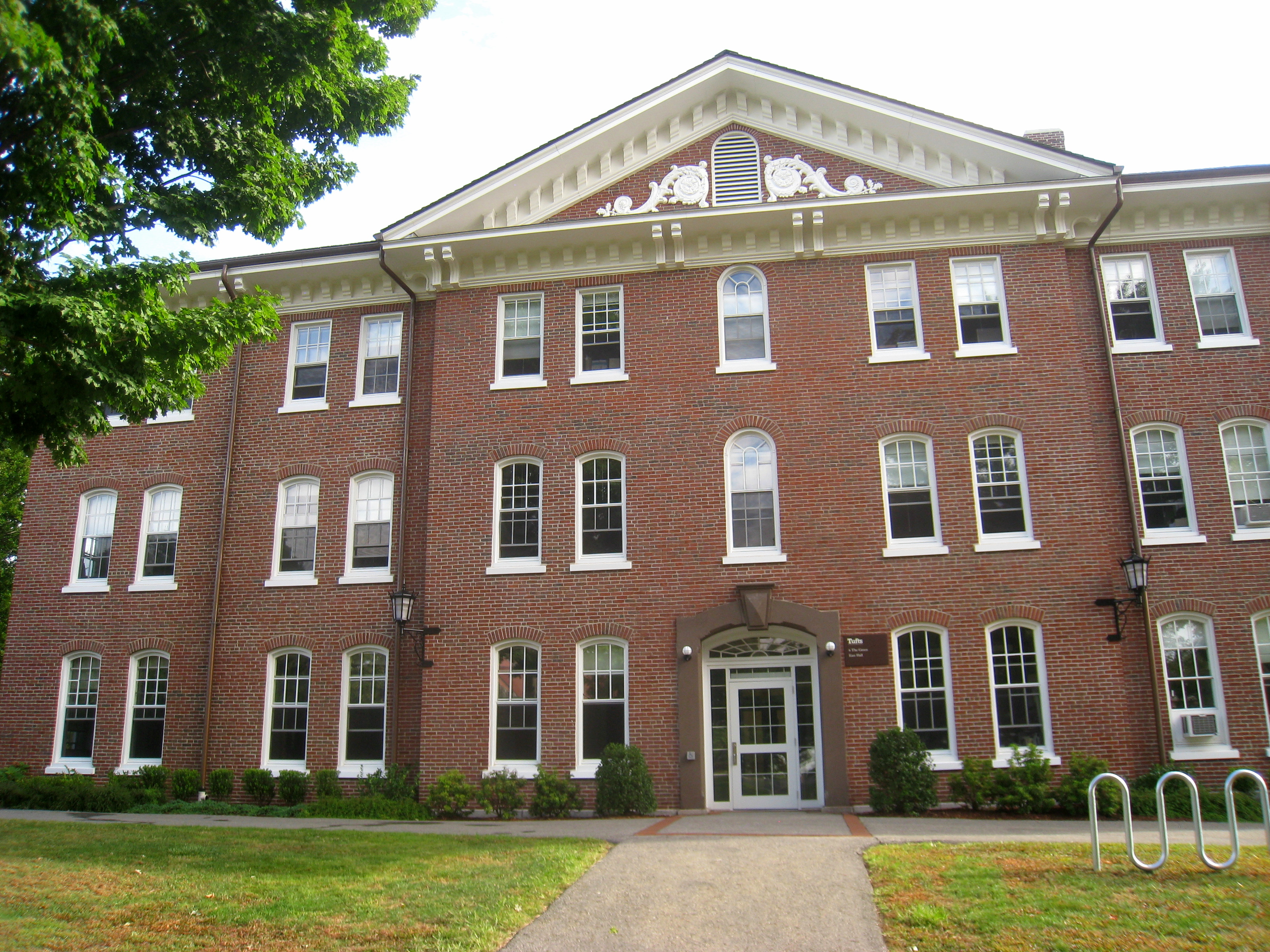
East Hall

The "Uphill" portion can be accessed with the memorial stairs. Designed by the Olmsted Brothers in the 1920s, the memorial stairs form one of the main entrances to the university and allows direct access to the engineering school from the academic quad. The engineering school is part of the Tufts's "Downhill" portion of campus. Notable buildings around the engineering school include Bromfield-Pearson Hall (1893), Robinson Hall (1899), and Curtis Hall (1894). Boston architect George Albert Clough is responsible for the design of Curtis Hall and Goddard Hall. Additionally, Arland Dirlam is responsible for the designs of many buildings downhill. These include Cohen Auditorium (1950), Hodgdon Hall (1954), and Jackson Gymnasium (1947). Other notable buildings downhill include the Mayer Campus Center and the Dewick Macphie Dining Hall. Administrative offices also occupy the surrounding neighborhoods and nearby Davis Square, where Tufts makes payments in lieu of taxes on some of its tax-exempt (educational) properties.

=== Boston ===
The School of Medicine, Graduate School of Biomedical Sciences, School of Dental Medicine, and the Friedman School of Nutrition Science and Policy are located on the Tufts Boston Health Science campus in the Chinatown neighborhood of Boston, adjacent to Tufts Medical Center, a 451-bed academic medical institution. All full-time Tufts Medical Center physicians hold clinical faculty appointments at Tufts School of Medicine.

The School of the Museum of Fine Arts at Tufts University (SMFA) is located on the Tufts Boston Fine Arts campus in the Fenway neighborhood of Boston, next door to the Museum of Fine Arts and the Isabella Stewart Gardner Museum. The late-2022 opening of the Green Line Extension of the MBTA Green Line E branch light rail transit route offers a one-seat direct connection between the SMFA and the main campus of Tufts University in Medford.

=== Grafton ===
The Cummings School of Veterinary Medicine is located in Grafton, Massachusetts, west of Boston, on a 634-acre (2.57 km^{2}) campus. The school also maintains the Ambulatory Farm Clinic in Woodstock, Connecticut and the Tufts Laboratory at the Marine Biological Laboratory at Woods Hole on Cape Cod.

=== Talloires ===
The Tufts European Center on the Talloires campus

Tufts has a satellite campus in Talloires, France at the Tufts European Center, a former Benedictine priory built in the 11th century. The priory was purchased in 1958 by Donald MacJannet and his wife Charlotte and used as a summer camp site for several years before the MacJannets gave the campus to Tufts in 1978.

Each year the center hosts a number of summer study programs, and enrolled students live with local families. The Tufts Summit Program is for American high school students during the month of July. Tufts in Talloires is a 6-week program for Tufts undergraduates that extends from the middle of May until the end of June. Additionally, Tufts in Annecy is a 4-week program which provides French language learners a chance to practice and learn the language. The site is frequently the host of international conferences and summits, most notably the Talloires Declaration which united 22 universities toward a goal of sustainability. The Talloires campus has been ranked as one of the best branch campuses by the National Association of Branch Campus Administrators.

== Organization and administration ==
College/school founding
| College/school | Year founded |
| Arts and Sciences | 1852 |
| Dental Medicine | 1868 |
| Religion (defunct) | 1869 |
| Fine Arts | 1876 |
| Medicine | 1893 |
| Engineering | 1898 |
| Jackson College for Women (merged) | 1910 |
| Boston School of Occupational Therapy (merged) | 1918 |
| Business (defunct) | 1920 |
| Law and Diplomacy | 1933 |
| Experimental | 1964 |
| Veterinary Medicine | 1978 |
| Biomedical | 1981 |
| Nutrition | 1981 |
| Citizenship and Public Service | 2000 |
| University College | 2018 |

Tufts University is an independent, privately supported, nonsectarian institution of higher education. Its official corporate name is The Trustees of Tufts College. The university is governed by up to forty-one trustees and no fewer than twenty-eight. The board is self-perpetuating, with trustees responsible for choosing their successors. In addition to the president, the university appoints charter trustees (up to 30 members) who are elected by the board and alumni trustees (up to 10 members) who serve for up to five years. Generally, charter trustees are elected by majority vote of the members and alumni trustees are elected by alumni. The officers of the corporation include the chair of the board, three vice chairs, the treasurer, the secretary, the provost, the president, who serves ex officio, and the executive vice president. The president of Tufts University, who is elected by the trustees, is the chief executive officer of the university. Assisting the president in administering the university are the provost, the executive vice president, the treasurer, and the secretary, all of whom are appointed by the trustees on the nomination of the president and serve at their pleasure. The 14th president, Sunil Kumar, became president on July 1 and was installed in a formal ceremony on October 6, 2023.

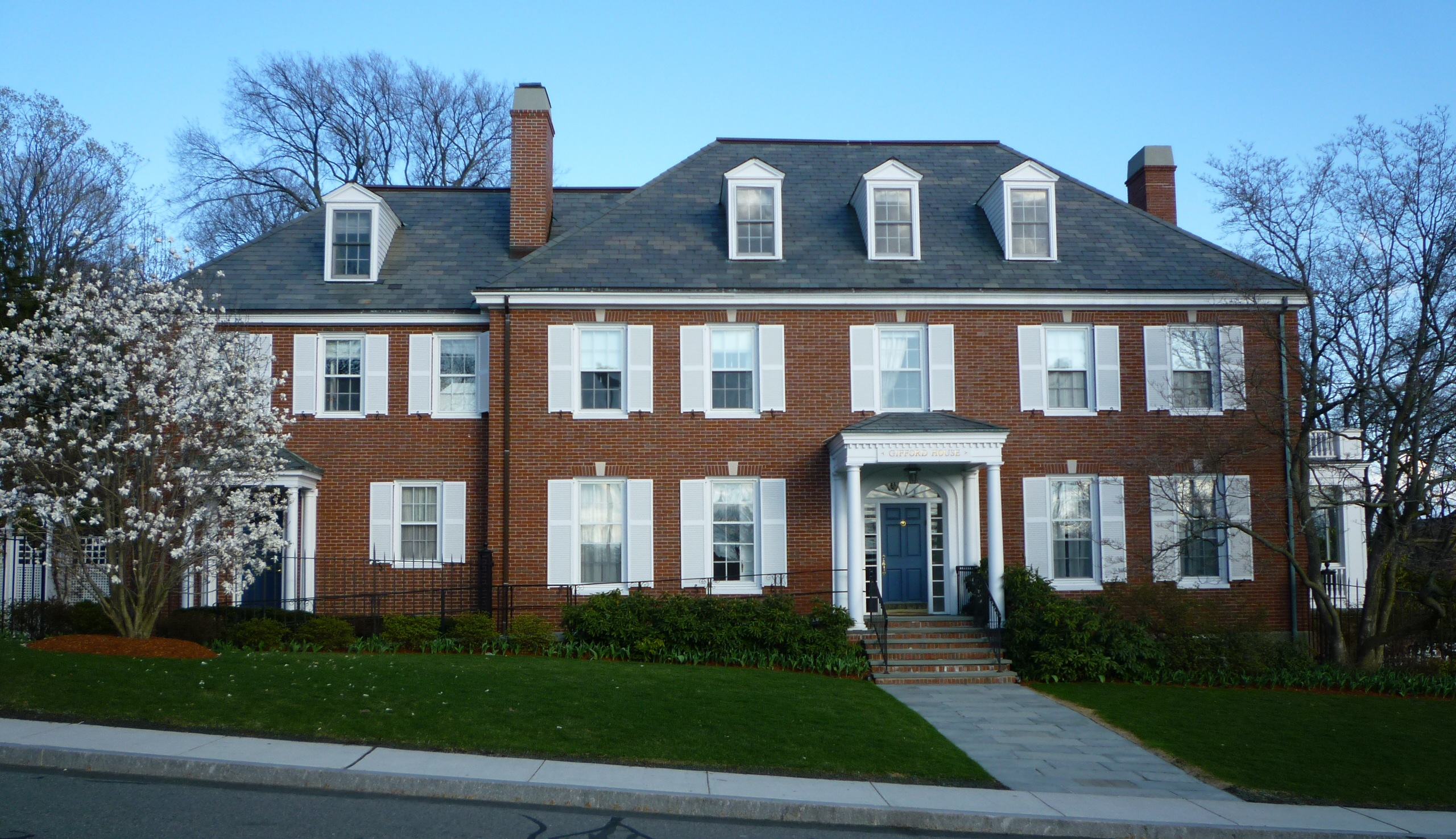
Gifford House, residence of the President

Tufts is organized into ten schools. Each school has its own faculty and is led by a dean appointed by the president and the provost with the consent of the board of trustees. The School of Arts and Sciences and the School of Engineering are the only schools that award both undergraduate and graduate degrees. The schools offering undergraduate education are the School of Arts and Sciences (the liberal arts college offering both the Bachelor of Arts and Bachelor of Science degree as well as the Bachelor of Fine Arts degree at the School of the Museum of Fine Arts), the School of Engineering (which offers the Bachelor of Science degree), and the School of Special Studies. The Jonathan M. Tisch College of Civic Life offers undergraduate and graduate programs and courses and, in collaboration with the School of Arts and Sciences, a co-major in Civic Studies. The Experimental College is non-degree granting.

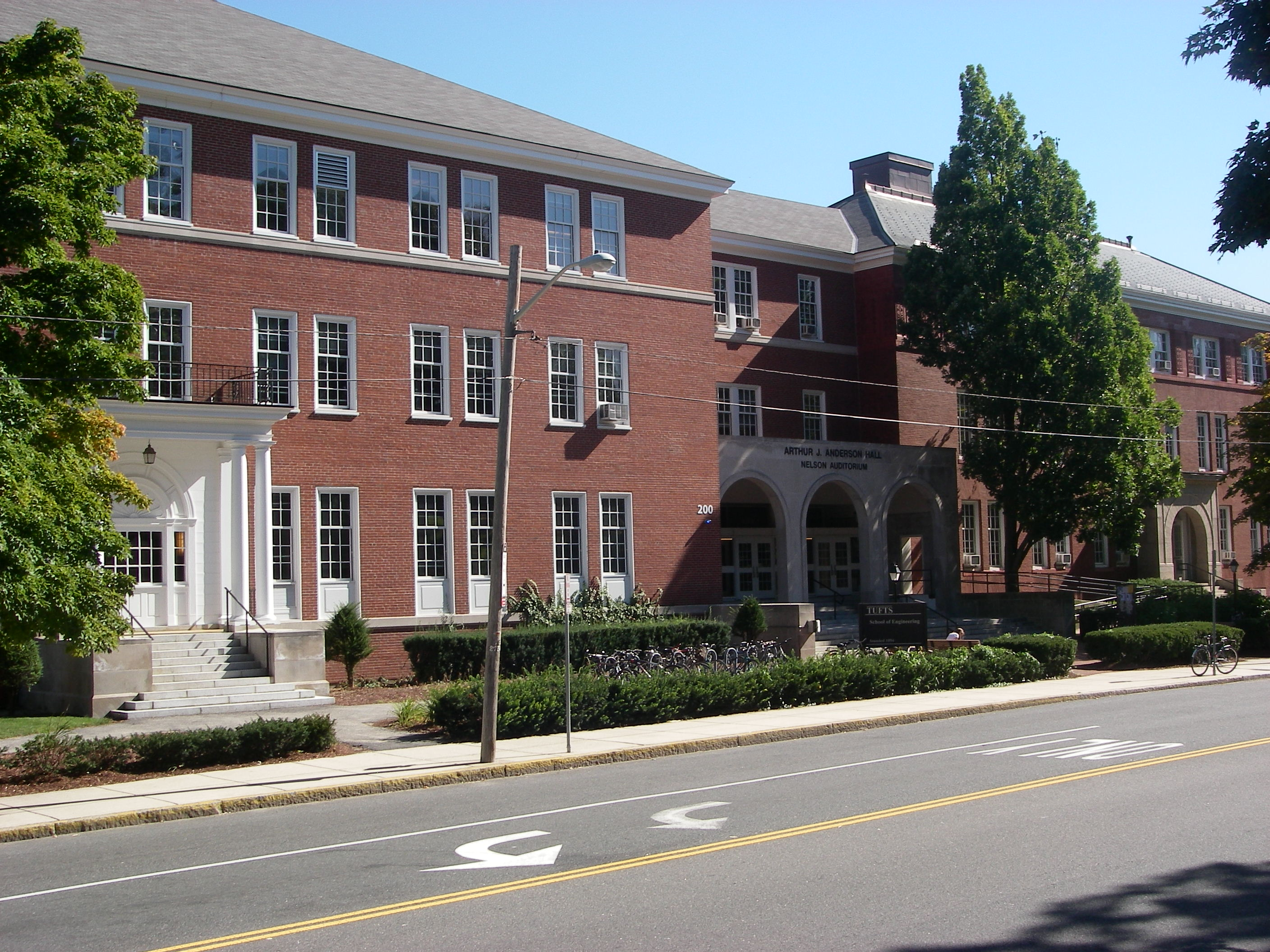
Anderson Hall, the School of Engineering

The Film and Media Studies program (FMS), formerly known as Communications and Media Studies (CMS), is the university's largest interdisciplinary minor program, which offers undergraduate majors and minors in film and media studies. It is affiliated with the Experimental College of Tufts University. Since 1997, FMS has awarded minors to nearly 1,000 students. Additionally, FMS supports student internships for academic credit at various global media companies. FMS also sponsors awards and events, such as The Edward R. Murrow Forum on Issues in Journalism, The Eliot-Pearson Awards for Excellence in Children's Media, and the P.T. Barnum Awards for Excellence in Entertainment.

The Tisch College was founded in 2000 "to educate for active citizenship" with the help of a $10 million (~$17.7 million in 2025) gift from eBay founder Pierre Omidyar and his wife Pam. The school was renamed in 2006 after a $40 million (~$61.4 million in 2025) gift from Jonathan Tisch. It has been called the "most ambitious attempt by any research university to make public service part of its core academic mission". The college facilitates and supports a wide range of community service, civic engagement programs, research, and teaching initiatives across the university. The university runs on a semester-based calendar with most undergraduate students finishing within four years. However, Tisch College provides a 1+4 Bridge year program where students have the opportunity to take a community service-based gap year before starting academics. Projects undertaken by Bridge Year Fellows involve serving as mentors and teachers to children, caring for rescued wild animals, contributing to renewable energy and sustainability projects. As of 2016, projects are based in Brazil, Nicaragua, and Spain.

== Academics ==
=== Rankings ===
Academic rankings

National
- Forbes: 52
- U.S. News & World Report: 31
- Washington Monthly: 47

Global
- ARWU: 151–200
- QS: 338
- THE: 179
- U.S. News & World Report: 275

In the 2026 U.S. News & World Report Best Colleges Ranking, Tufts ranked 31st in the nation.

Forbes ranked the undergraduate school 36th among private colleges in its 2024-25 America's Top Colleges ranking, which includes 500 military academies, national universities, and liberal arts colleges. Tufts University is accredited by the New England Commission of Higher Education.

Tufts was named by Newsweek as one of the "25 New Ivies" in 2006. In The Princeton Review's 2010–2011 "Best 363 Colleges", Tufts was ranked 14th for the happiest students and its study abroad program was ranked third in the country. According to the October 2010 rankings compiled by The Chronicle of Higher Education, Tufts ranked 12th in the country (tied with both Harvard and Johns Hopkins) with 17 Fulbright scholars. Tufts also ranks fourth among medium-sized schools for the number of Teach for America volunteers it produces. Because of its continual growth as an institution, Tufts was ranked as the fifth "hottest school" of the decade from 2000 to 2010. Tufts was ranked the 450th top college in the United States by Payscale and CollegeNet's Social Mobility Index college rankings.

=== Admissions ===
==== Undergraduate admissions ====
Undergraduate admissions statistics
- 2022 entering class
- Admit rate: 9% (▼ −5.3)
- Yield rate: 50.6% (▲ +4.4)

Test scores middle 50%
- SAT Total: 1460–1560 (▲ +65 median)
- ACT Composite: 33–35 (▲ +1.5 median)

U.S. News & World Report names Tufts' undergraduate admission as "most selective". For the class of 2029, Tufts admitted 10.5% of 33,400 applicants. The number of places in the freshmen class is set at approximately 1,600 students. For the class of 2024, the interquartile range of SAT scores was 1420–1550 while for the ACT it was 33–35.

Since 2006 Tufts has incorporated experimental criteria into the application process for undergraduates to test "creativity and other non-academic factors", including inviting applicants to submit YouTube videos to supplement their application. Calling it the "first major university to try such a departure from the norm", Inside Higher Ed also notes that Tufts continues to consider the SAT and other traditional criteria. Tufts accepts undocumented immigrant students with and without Deferred Action for Childhood Arrivals (DACA). Undocumented students are not considered international students, but rather domestic students.

In 1856, shortly after Tufts opened, its admissions application asked for statements of good character and for students to complete examinations in Greek, history, Latin, and mathematics. As part of these examinations, they were asked to study a list of relevant textbooks. By 1905 the admissions requirements became lengthier, and the examinations became more complex; the latter required students to write essays and translations. Julia Ryan of The Atlantic wrote that because students certified by the New England College Entrance Certificate Board, ones who attended private preparatory schools in New England, were exempt from the examinations, "perhaps only a few students were even taking [the entrance examinations]." By 1925, Tufts set an admission quota of 650 males; the examinations were similar in length to the 1905 tests but the entry requirements decreased to a level comparable to those of 1856. Standardized testing, admissions interviews, and other features of the university admissions process were in place by 1946.

=== Collaborations ===
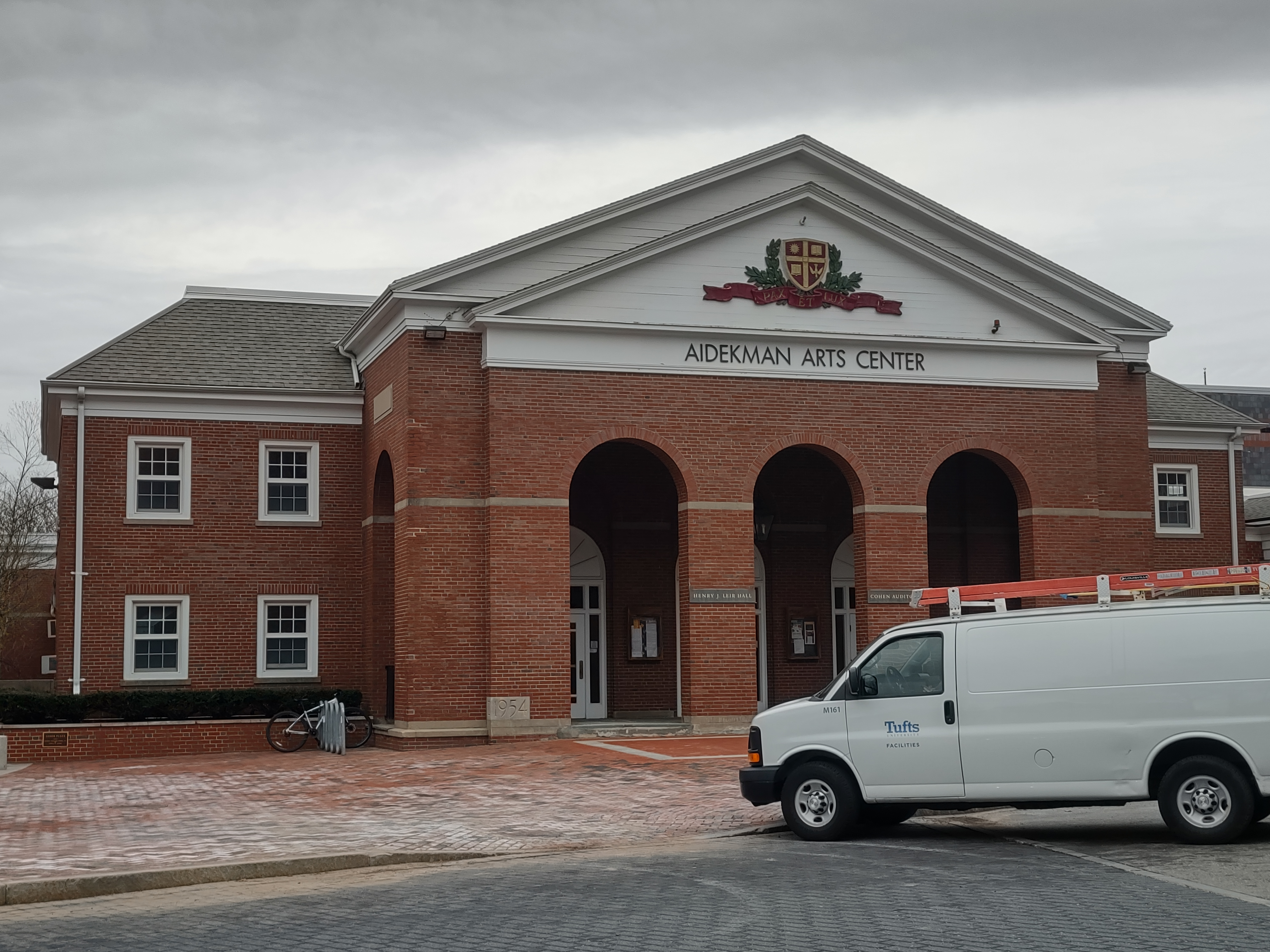
Aidekman Arts Center, Tufts University

Students can pursue a five-year program with the New England Conservatory. The Cosmology department also offers joint seminars with MIT. Organized by Alan Guth and Alexander Vilenkin, the seminars are open to all students. The Fletcher School also operates dual degree programs with Harvard Law School, Tuck School of Business at Dartmouth, and UC Berkeley School of Law, among others. Several academic consortiums allow for research collaboration between local schools. Examples exist with the Program on Negotiation, the ROTC, the Tufts-New England Medical Center, the Center for European Studies, and the School of Engineering. Several exchange programs allow students to study at the Graduate Institute of International and Development Studies in Geneva and the Sciences Po in Paris. Cross registration exists for undergraduate students with schools in the Boston Consortium. Fletcher and other graduate students may cross register with the graduate schools at Harvard and MIT.

Tufts has offered study abroad programs for the past 40 years. Tufts has semester and year long programs with Pembroke College of the University of Oxford, University College London, Royal Holloway University of London, School of Oriental and African Studies, University of Paris, Sciences Po Paris, École nationale supérieure des Beaux-Arts, University of Tübingen, Zhejiang University, and University of Hong Kong. Every year more than 500 undergraduate students study abroad, most during their junior and senior years.

Tufts is an active member of the University of the Arctic. UArctic is an international cooperative network based in the Circumpolar Arctic region, consisting of more than 200 universities, colleges, and other organizations with an interest in promoting education and research in the Arctic region.

=== Archives, libraries, and museums ===
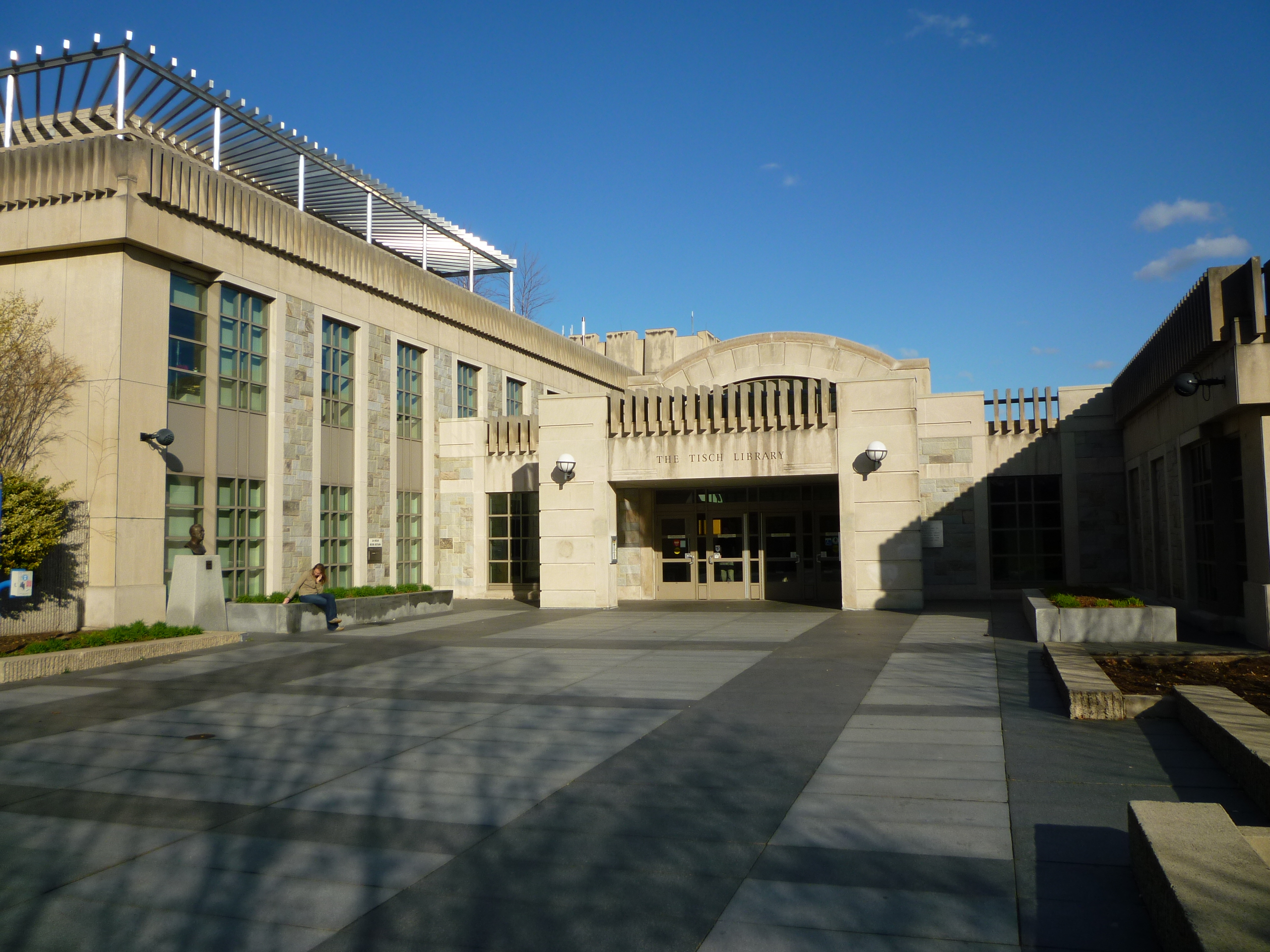
Entrance to Tisch Library, the main library on campus

Completed in 1908, Tufts' first library building, Eaton Memorial Library (now Eaton Hall), was made possible with a donation from Andrew Carnegie. Carnegie's wife requested that the building be named after a Tufts graduate, Reverend Charles Eaton, who had presided over her wedding. The building received an extension in 1950 with the construction of the War Memorial Library in honor of the Tufts alumni who served in World War II. By 1965 the collection outgrew the building and was moved to a new library named Wessell Library. Additionally, the demand for more square footage prompted the expansion of Wessell. In 1995, with the addition of 80,000 square feet (7,400 m^{2}), the library was renamed Tisch Library.

Today the Tufts University Library System contains over three million volumes. The main library, Tisch Library, holds about 2.7 million volumes, with other holdings dispersed at subject libraries including the Hirsh Health Sciences Library on the Boston campus, the Edwin Ginn Library at the Fletcher School, and Webster Family Library at the Cummings School of Veterinary Medicine on the Grafton campus. Students have access to the academic libraries of institutions in the Boston Consortium. Tufts is also a member of SHARES, which allows students to have library access in participating members such as Brown, Columbia, Cornell, Caltech, Dartmouth, Johns Hopkins, Northwestern, Princeton, Stanford, UPenn and Yale. Furthermore, students may apply for privileges to Harvard's Library System. Tufts also runs the Perseus Project, a digital library project that assembles digital collections of humanities resources.

In addition to the Barnum Museum of Natural History, Tufts had established a permanent art collection which includes a wide range of art from antiquity to the present. The Collection comprises 2,000 works from ancient Mediterranean and pre-Hispanic cultures to modern and contemporary painting, sculpture, and photography. Notable highlights in the permanent collection include works by John Singer Sargent, Albrecht Dürer, Isamu Noguchi, Auguste Rodin, Andy Warhol, Milton Resnick, Salvador Dalí, and Pablo Picasso among others. Exhibitions of the collection rotate annually in the Aidekman Arts Center.

== Student life ==
Student body composition as of May 2, 2022
| Race and ethnicity | Total |
|---|---|
| White | 51% |
| Asian | 15% |
| Foreign national | 11% |
| Other (Note: Other consists of Multiracial Americans & those who prefer to not say.) | 10% |
| Hispanic | 8% |
| Black | 5% |
Economic diversity
| Low-income (Note: The percentage of students who received an income-based federal Pell grant intended for low-income students.) | 11% |
| Affluent (Note: The percentage of students who are a part of the American middle class at the bare minimum.) | 89% |

=== Student body ===
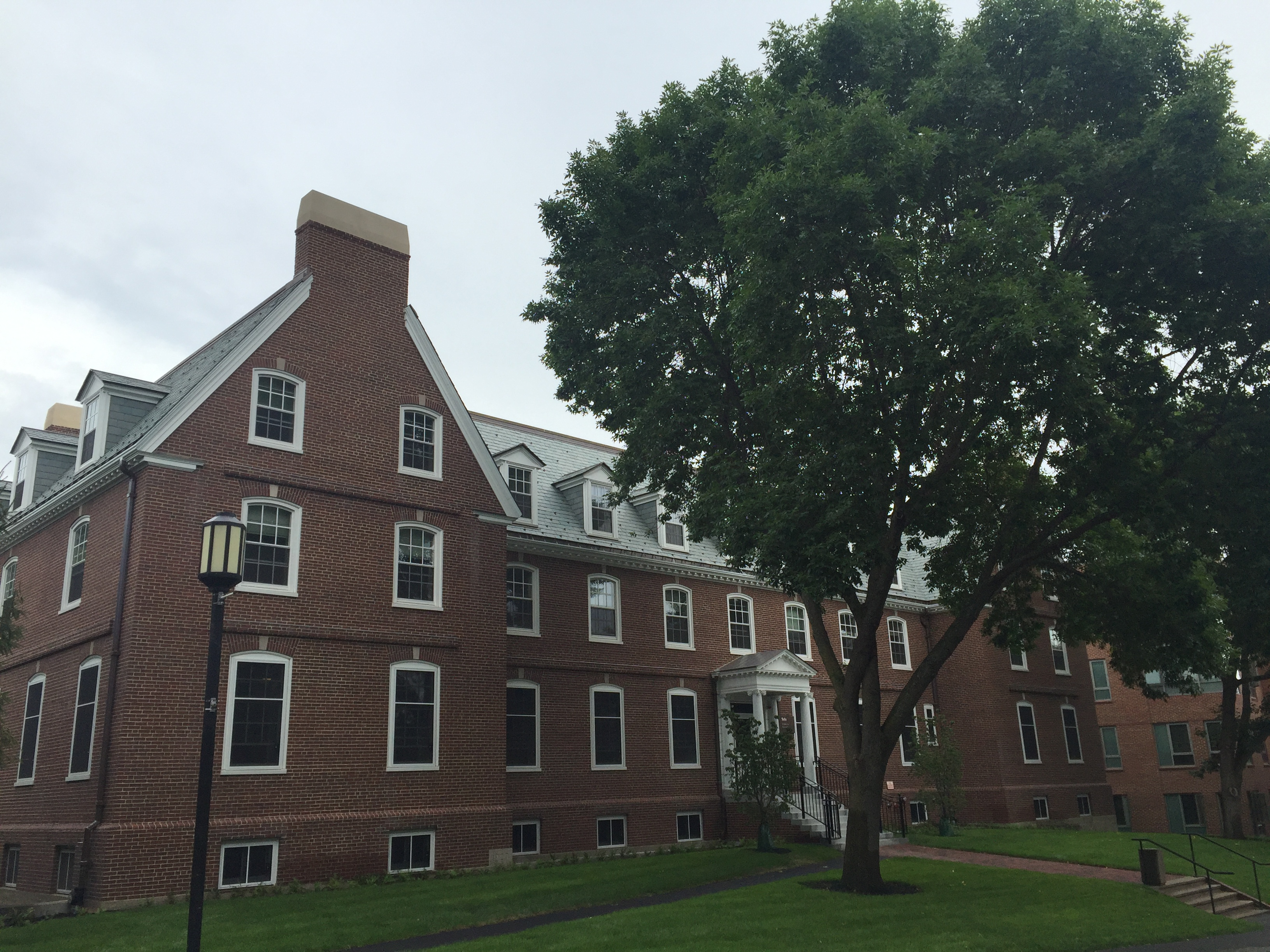
Stratton Hall, a downhill residence hall

According to the Princeton Review, the undergraduate student body is ethnically and socioeconomically diverse. The Advocate ranks Tufts as one of the top 20 gay-friendly campuses. Of those accepted for admission to the undergraduate Class of 2019, 27 percent are Asian, Hispanic, African American, or two or more races. There were 145 international students and 6 DACA students Of domestic students admitted, some 31 percent self-identified as one or more races other than Caucasian, including Asian Americans, African Americans, Hispanic Americans and Native Americans. International students make up 15 percent of the undergraduate student population. Students come from all 50 states and represent 71 countries. The top 10 countries represented are China, Greece, Hong Kong, India, Turkey, Singapore, Canada, South Korea, the United Kingdom, and Vietnam.

==== Student government ====
There are three forms of student government at Tufts University: The Tufts Community Union (TCU) Senate, the TCU Judiciary (TCUJ) and the CSL (Committee on Student Life). The Senate is chaired by the student body president and led by a six-person executive board consisting of Vice President, Treasurer, Historian, Parliamentarian, and Diversity and Community Affairs Officer.

==== Concerns of antisemitism ====
In September 2019, a Jewish student at Tufts was targeted in an antisemitic incident when a swastika was attached to their door. Then-President Anthony Monaco condemned what he called a "cowardly act."

In 2020, Students for Justice in Palestine (SJP) proposed a student referendum on ending the campus police department's exchange program with Israeli police forces and military, dubbed by activists as the "Deadly Exchange". Max Price, a member of TCUJ, a seven‑member group tasked with fact checking and removing bias from student government legislation, said that the proposed referendum and campaign rested on mistruths and needed to be revised before it could be approved for the student ballot. The SJP first demanded his removal from the discussion, and then his impeachment from the TCUJ altogether. Price sought legal assistance, which garnered national attention and resulted in the cancellation of the impeachment hearing. In a report by the Jewish News Syndicate, Price stated that he had been the victim of harassment by the SJP for his Zionist beliefs. In the same article, Price's lawyers stated that the Senate of the student governing body had harassed him by making him "sit through meetings by Tufts student‍–‍government leadership questioning his personal beliefs and identity as a pro‑Israel Jew".

The SJP, some of whose leading figures were allegedly Jewish, reported that its members had faced harassment, threats to publish their identities and "false accusations in the right-wing media" during the intense media attention following Price's complaint. The revised referendum on the issue garnered record voter turnout and passed with 68% of the vote, but university administration did not respond to its demands.

In September 2021, a Jewish student's mezuzah was "stripped from the doorpost" of the student's dormitory room.

In 2021, Jewish on Campus published Jewish On Campus Antisemitism Annual Report: 2021 which identified Tufts as the U.S. college or university with the most submitted reports of antisemitic incidents when adjusted for student body size. Thirty-four submissions came from Tufts. That same year, the university conducted a campus wide survey of antisemitic incidents at Tufts. The survey found that more than half of Jewish student respondents reported to have observed some form of antisemitism at Tufts. Then Tufts President Monaco said in a statement, "Disturbingly we also heard from some Jewish students who felt that, in order to be welcome in student organizations supporting social justice, they had to hide their Jewish identities."

In February 2023, a program about dialogue between Israelis and Palestinians sponsored by Tufts student organizations was disrupted by masked individuals shouting “genocide” and insulting the speakers. President Monaco condemned the actions as "part of an alarming trend of increasing antisemitism nationally."

In 2024, the Anti-Defamation League (ADL) gave Tufts a grade of "F" for failing to address campus antisemitism. In 2025, Tuft's grade from the ADL improved to a grade of "C". The following year, the Special Commission on Combatting Antisemitism in Massachusetts held a hearing on challenges of antisemitism on college campuses, particularly focusing on recent events and university responses. Tufts Political Science Professor Eitan Hersh testified about Jewish student experiences on college campuses.

==== Publications and broadcasting ====
The Tufts Daily is the daily student newspaper, and the Tufts Observer, established in 1895, is the school's biweekly magazine and the oldest publication on campus. The Princeton Review has named Tufts' college newspaper as one of the best in the country, ranking No. 10 as of 2016. Tufts has a television station (TUTV) which has produced and broadcast films, news, soap operas, and comedy sketch pieces. TUTV has also gone to release web series such as "Jules and Monty". The station went operational in April 1977, from Curtis Hall and consists of 40 student volunteers. Curtis Hall is also home to Tufts' own radio station WMFO, which streams locally on 91.5 FM. The station first aired in 1970 and is funded by the university. The university publishes its alumni magazine, Tufts Magazine, twice per year, as well as four magazines for the university's professional schools (Tufts Nutrition, Tufts Dental Medicine, Tufts Medicine and Tufts Veterinary Medicine).

===== The Zamboni =====
The Zamboni April 2014

The Zamboni is a student-run humor publication founded in 1989 and released twice a semester. It contains satirical articles (such as fake news briefs, interviews, and op-ed pieces), cartoons, and photos. Their slogan is "Tufts University's Only Intentionally Funny Magazine" and motto is "Cowering Behind the First Amendment Since 1989." The Zamboni is fully funded by the Student Activities Fee as allocated by the Tufts Senate. The name itself came from Josh Wolk (Class of '91), who always expressed amusement of the concept of an actual Zamboni. "It just seemed silly to be a guy driving a machine around the ice." In spring 2015, The Zamboni rewrote its constitution to prepare for the next generation of humor content. The new board includes six positions: the editor-in-chief, managing editor, creative director, digital manager, publicity director, and editor-at-large as well as assistant board positions. This restructuring focuses The Zamboni more on digital and multimedia content. The names of many The Zamboni's editors-in-chief appeared in the publication's 100th issue.

==== Activism ====
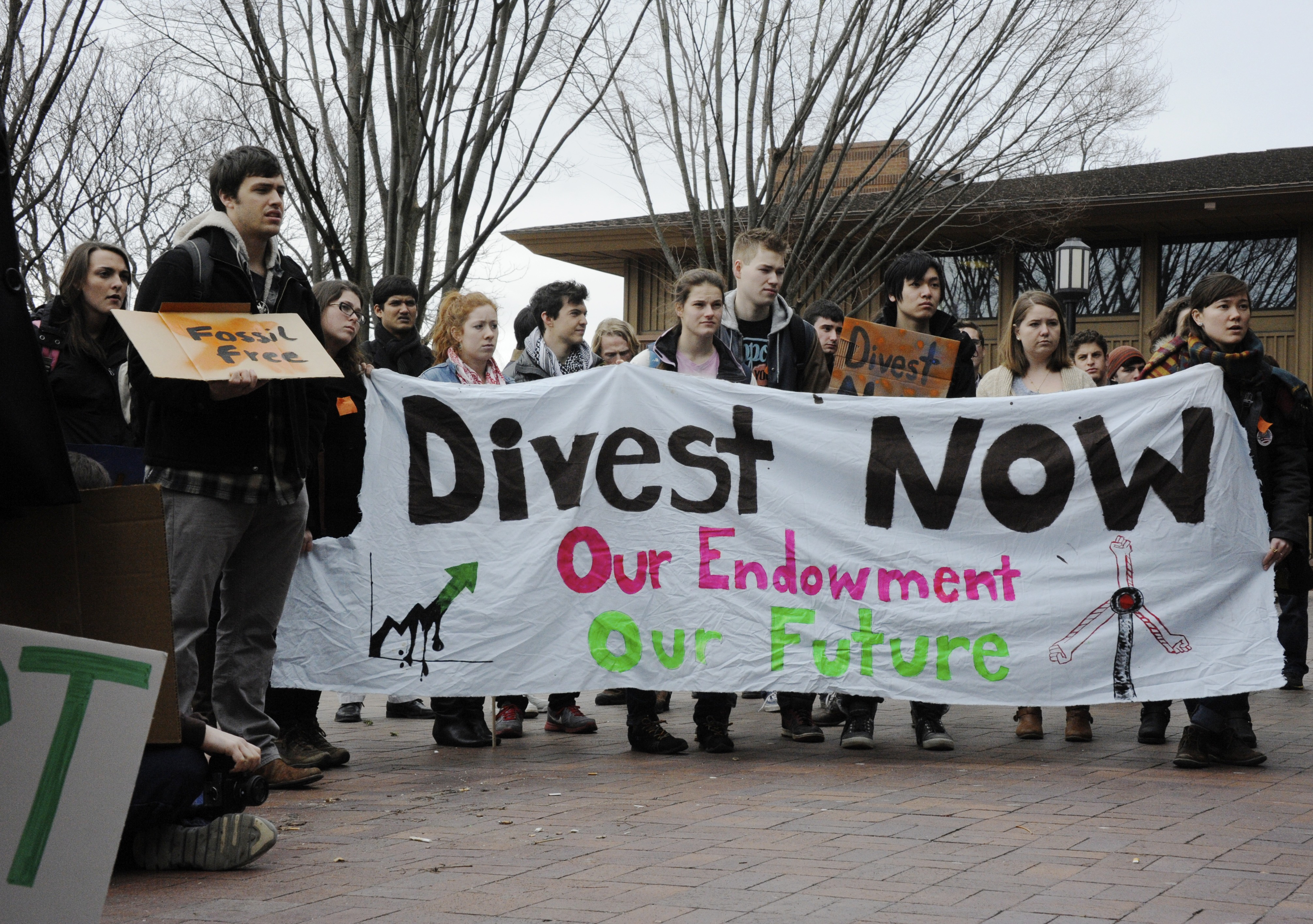
Student protest for fossil fuel divestment

In 1969, Tufts was the center for civil rights activism due to the controversy surrounding the construction of Lewis Hall. Students staged a work strike to protest racist hiring policies practiced by the construction company Tufts had commissioned to build the residence hall. In addition to writing letters, students sat in Ballou and East Halls, and collaborated with black workers. These demonstrations eventually attracted support from major metropolitan areas in the Northeast. In 1970, Tufts adopted new hiring policies which were subsequently adopted by other universities. It led to the creation of training programs for minority employees on campus, in addition to the foundation of the Africana Center.

==== Greek life ====
About 18% of the student body is involved in Greek life. There are four fraternities on campus, four sororities, one co-ed independent fraternity, and four active city-wide, multicultural organizations.

=== Athletics ===
Tufts competes in the New England Small College Athletic Conference—the NESCAC—in NCAA Division III. Their mascot is Jumbo, which is one of two college mascots to appear in Webster's Dictionary. with the other being the Billiken of Saint Louis University.

In 2022, Tufts won the Learfield Director's Cup. The women's softball team won three consecutive NCAA Division III National Championships, in 2013, 2014 and 2015. The men's lacrosse team won their second NCAA Division III National Championship in 2014 and their third Championship in 2015, beating Lynchburg College. On December 6, 2014, the men's soccer team won its first-ever DIII National Championship, defeating Wheaton College 4–2. The Jumbos repeated this feat two years later, winning the D-III National Championship in 2016 by defeating Calvin College 1–0. The men's and women's squash teams have been historically successful, ranking within the top 30 teams in the nation. The Men's Varsity Swim and Dive team won the first NESCAC Championship in school history in 2018 and the team placed 7th in the nation at the National Championship meet that same year.

Performed at most football games, "Tuftonia's Day", the Tufts fight song, was written in 1912 by Elliot W. Hayes. It can also be heard at Tufts' numerous a cappella concerts and at homecoming.

In 2024, twenty-four students who participated in a Tufts University men's lacrosse team workout developed rhabdomyolysis, also known as rhabdo.

== Traditions ==
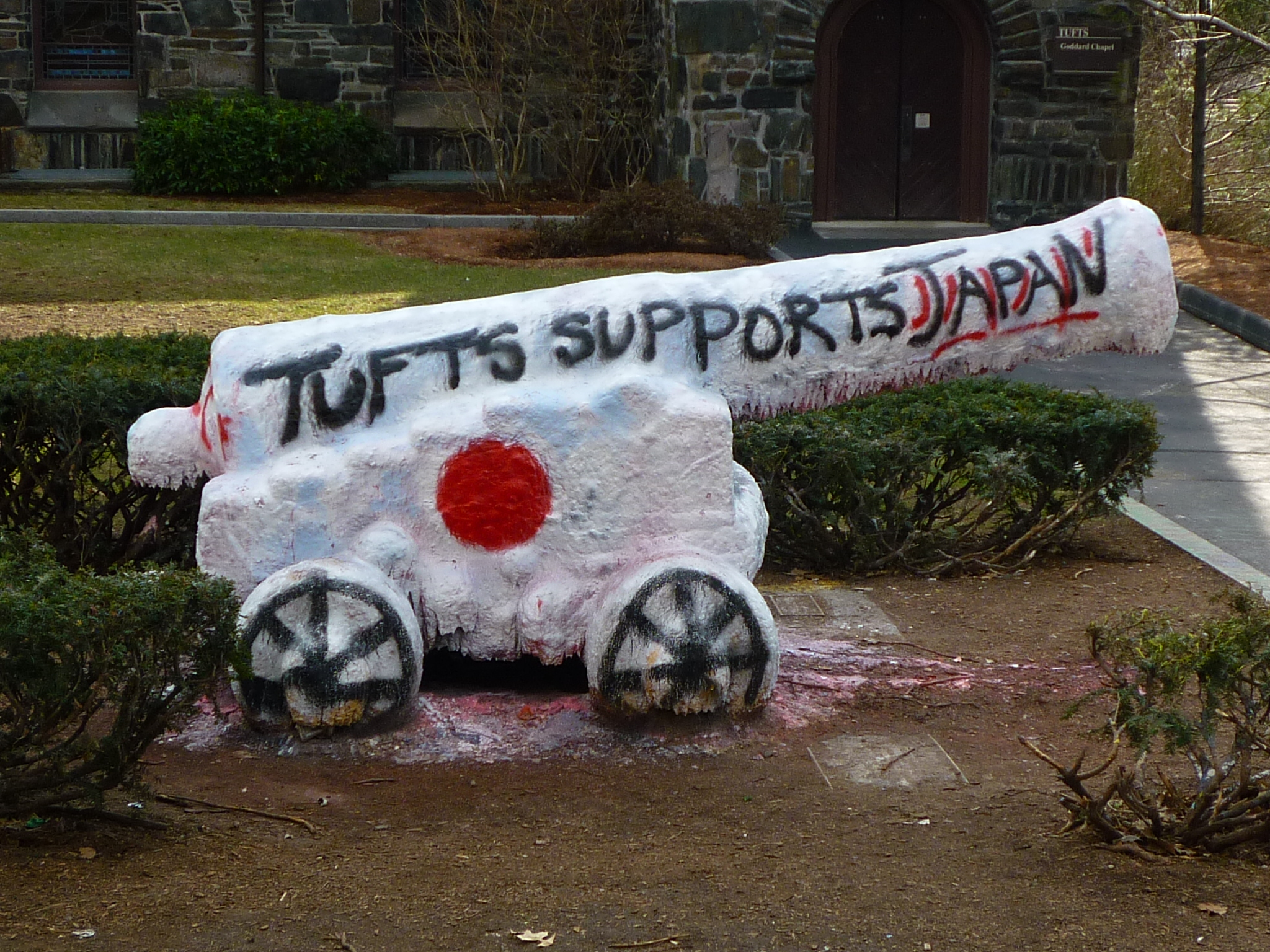
The Tufts cannon, repainted almost nightly during the academic year, is here painted in response to the 2011 earthquake and tsunami in Japan

=== A cappella ===
Tufts maintains a cappella groups, including the Beelzebubs, which has performed on NBC's The Sing-Off and Glee, where the group arranged several of the songs performed by the fictional a cappella group The Warblers. Other groups include the Amalgamates and the Jackson Jills, Tufts' oldest female group. The Jills' name originate from their days within the Jackson College for Women.

=== Naked Quad Run ===
Every winter just prior to final exams, students would run naked laps on the Academic Quad as a way to relieve the stress of finals, much akin to similar traditions such as the Primal Scream at Harvard. Owing to scrutiny from the administration and injuries incurred by slipping on the icy roads, the tradition was banned in 2011 by then-President Lawrence Bacow, much to students' dismay. A protest run took place the following year, with some students donning nude colored leotards and others taking the opposite tack, calling their event the "Excessively Overdressed Quad Stroll". Starting in 2016, the tradition was revitalized for spring finals week and briefly became an annual tradition once more. The run has not regained popularity since the start of the COVID-19 pandemic, though in 2022, the administration reminded students that the run violated the Student Code of Conduct, Sexual Misconduct Policy, and local laws. Several students informally organized a nighttime run in underwear in response.

== Notable people ==
The university's alumni, faculty, and affiliates include three Nobel Prize laureates, twelve Pulitzer Prize winners, five state governors, two U.S. Senators, four Emmy Award winners, one Grammy Award winner, and three Academy Award winners. Tufts has also graduated four Rhodes Scholars, five Marshall Scholars, five Truman Scholars, and five Goldwater Scholars.

Tufts alumni in the government sector include Admiral James Stavridis, former dean of the Fletcher School at Tufts University and former Commander of Southern Command and Supreme Allied Commander of NATO (MALD 1983, PhD 1984); Mulatu Teshome Wirtu (MALD 1990), President of Ethiopia from 2013 to 2018; Kostas Karamanlis (MA 1982, PhD 1984), former Prime Minister of Greece; Arjun Narasingha KC (Post-graduate fellow in international diplomacy), former Health, Education and Urban Development Minister of Nepal; Shashi Tharoor (MA 1976, MALD 1977, PhD 1979), former United Nations Under-Secretary General and Indian Member of Parliament; Syed Refat Ahmed (MALD, PhD), former Chief Justice of Bangladesh; Peter DeFazio (BA 1969), Democratic United States Representative from Oregon; and Dan Crenshaw, former Navy SEAL, recipient of two Bronze Stars, and a US Representative for the state of Texas.

Graduates who have found success in business include Pierre Omidyar (BS 1988), eBay founder; Laura Lang (BA 1977), CEO of Time Inc; Jamie Dimon (BA 1978), CEO of JPMorgan Chase; John Bello (BA 1968), SoBe Beverages founder; Jeff Kindler (BA 1977), former CEO of Pfizer; Jonathan Tisch (BA 1976), CEO of Loews Hotels; Ellen J. Kullman (BA 1978), CEO of DuPont; and Anthony Scaramucci (BA 1986), Cofounder of SkyBridge Capital and Former Director of Communications for the Trump Administration, Seth Godin (BS 1982), bestselling author and founder of Squidoo.

In media, alumni include David Faber (BA 1985), anchor at CNBC; Meredith Vieira (BA 1975), journalist and TV personality; Arthur Ochs Sulzberger, Jr. (BA 1974), publisher of The New York Times; Peter Roth (BA 1972), CEO of Warner Bros. Television; and Josh Gates, TV host and producer.

In the arts, alumni include Tracy Chapman (BA 1987), singer-songwriter; Oliver Platt (BA 1982) actor; William Hurt (BA 1972), Academy Award–winning actor; Hank Azaria (BA 1988), actor and voice actor; Peter Gallagher (BA 1977), actor; Deke Sharon (BA 1991), a cappella musician; Darin Strauss (BA 1992), National Book Critics Circle Award–winning author; Ruben Bolling (real name Ken Fisher) (BA 1984), cartoonist and writer; and Gregory Maguire (PhD 1990), novelist.

Active and former Tufts faculty include former American Psychological Association president Robert Sternberg; Pulitzer Prize–winning historian Martin J. Sherwin; philosopher Daniel Dennett; Nobel Laureate Allan M. Cormack; Nobel Laureate Paul Samuelson; Nobel Laureate Wassily Leontief; Nobel Laureate Mohamed ElBaradei; Nobel Laureate Rainer Weiss; Daniel W. Drezner, regular featured columnist in Foreign Policy Magazine; radio host Lonnie Carton; Japanese author Haruki Murakami; and author Lee Edelman.

Notable Tufts University alumni include:

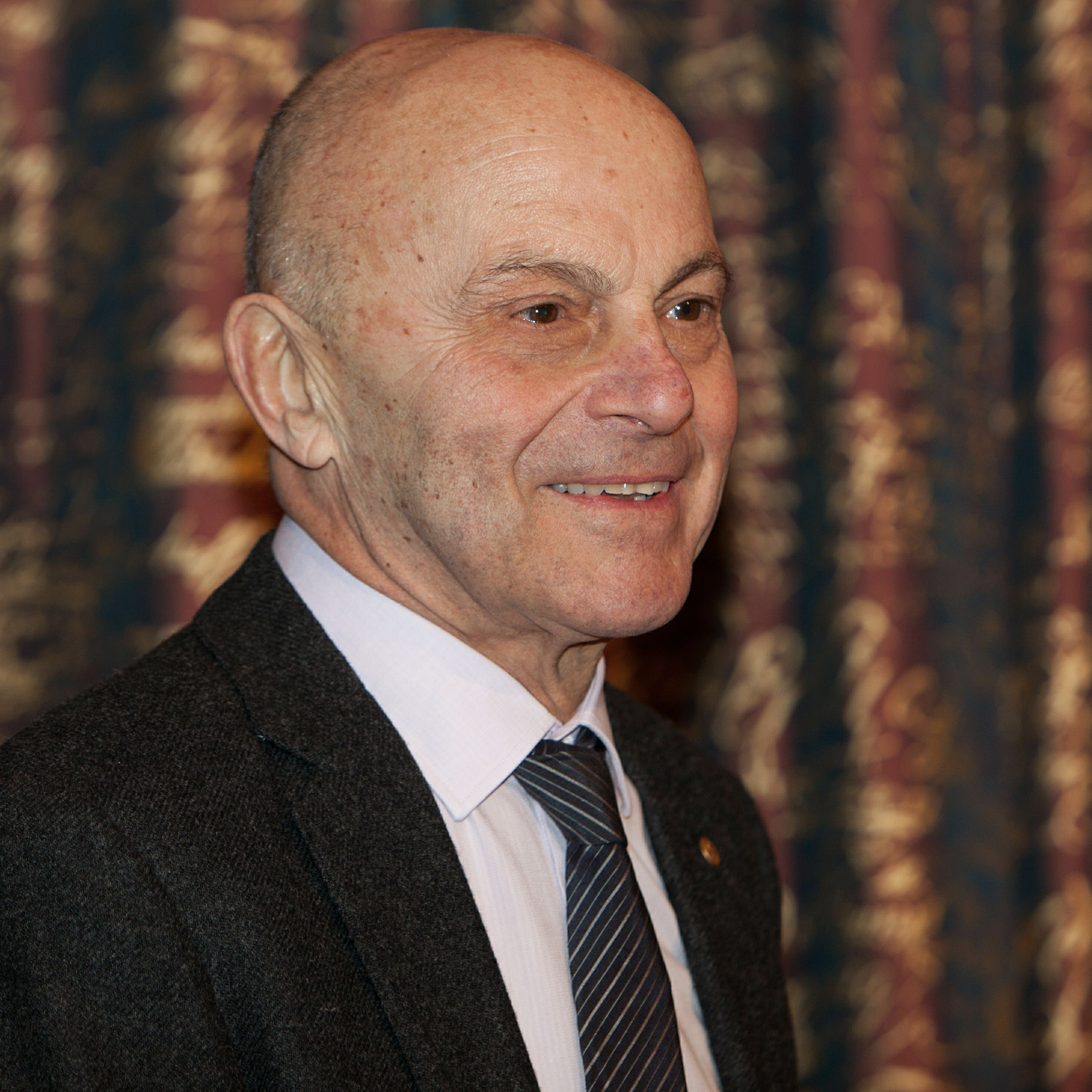
Eugene Fama, economist and winner of the Nobel Prize in Economics (BA, 1960)

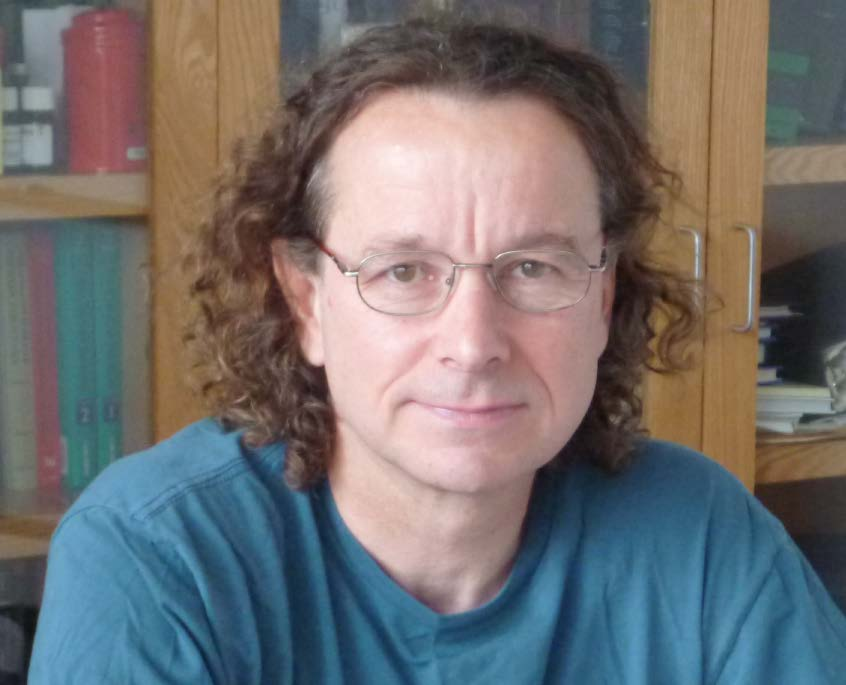
Roderick MacKinnon, Nobel Prize in Chemistry laureate (MD, 1982)

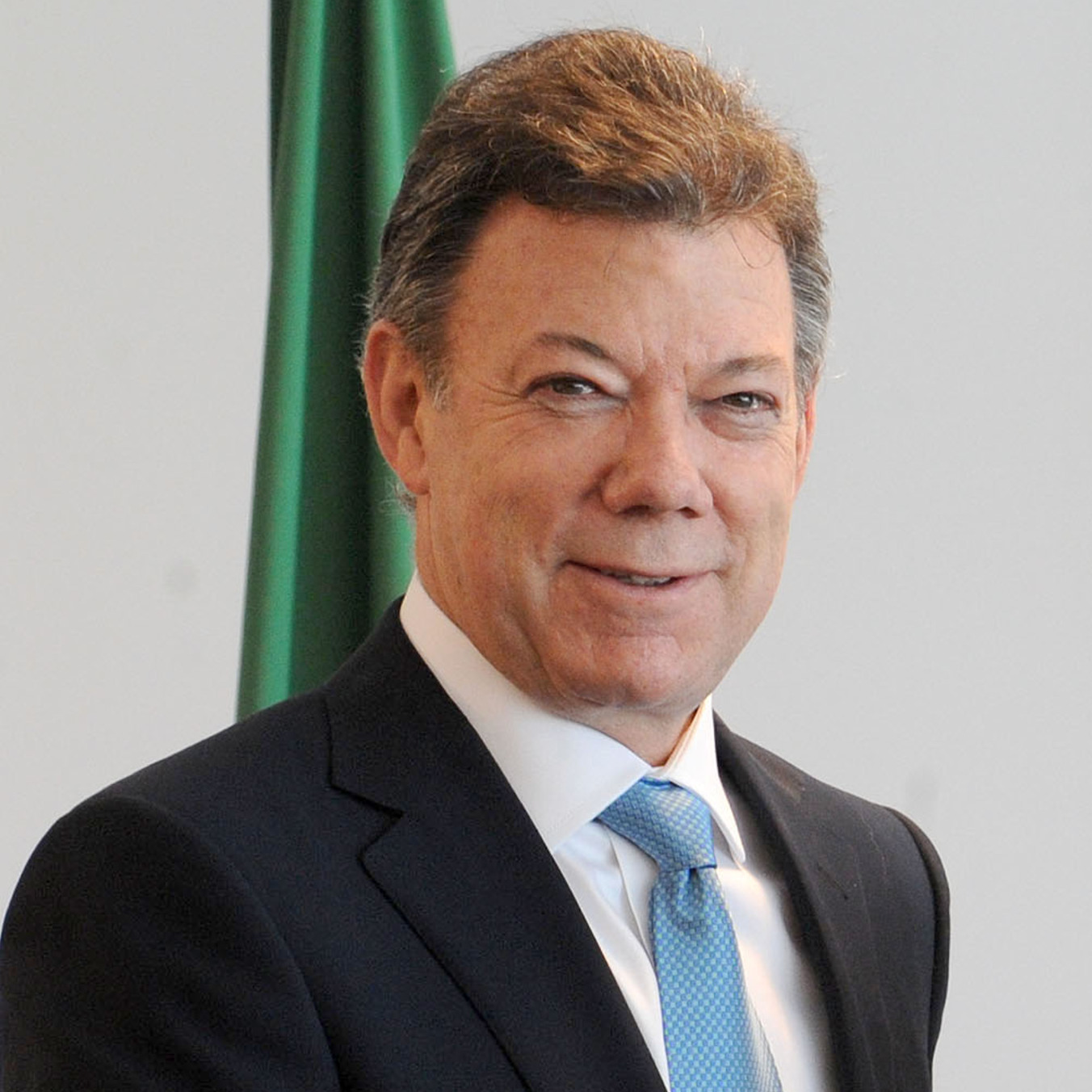
Juan Manuel Santos, President of Colombia and recipient of the 2016 Nobel Peace Prize (MA, 1981)

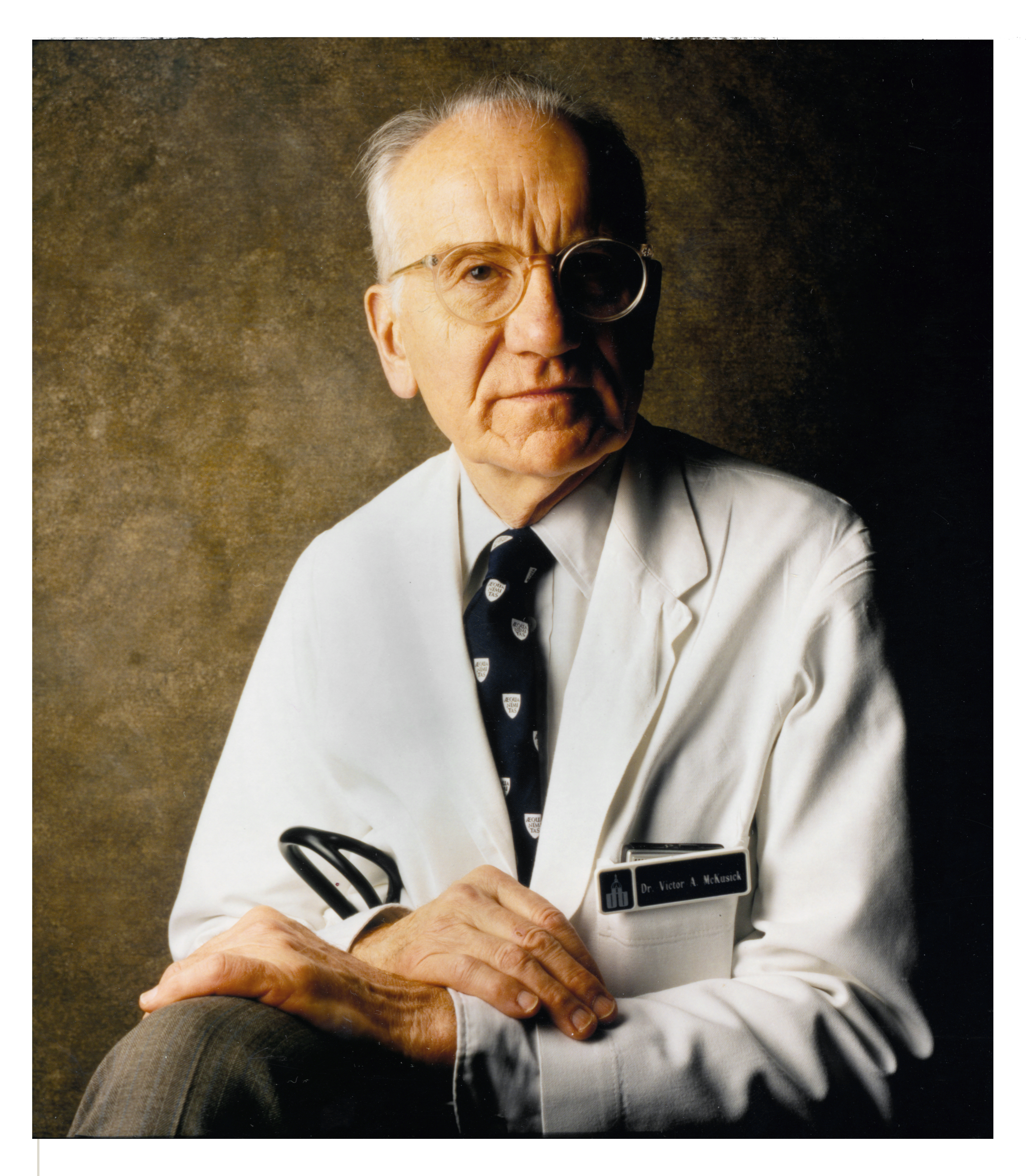
Victor McKusick, geneticist known as the father of medical genetics (transferred to medical school, no degree)

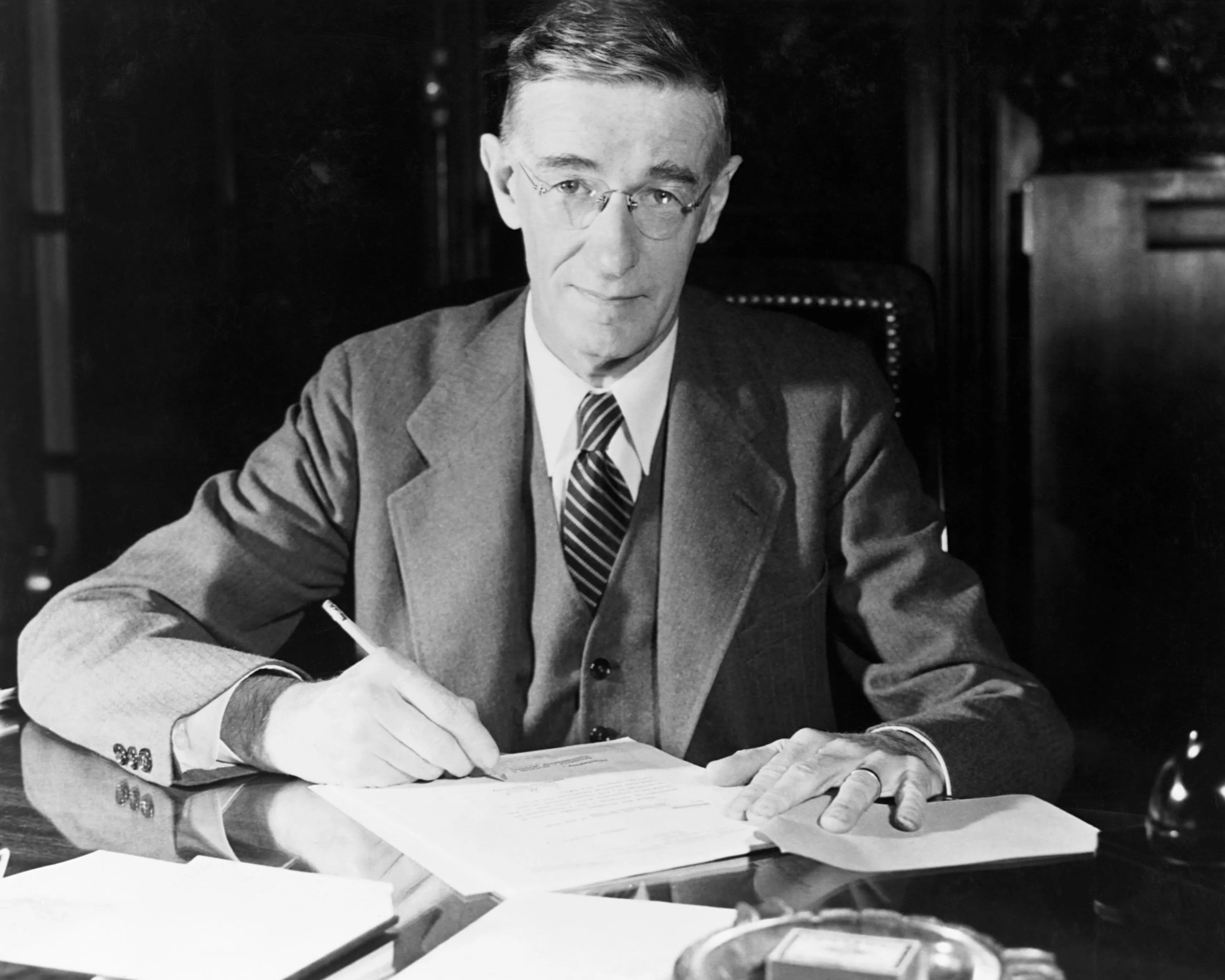
Vannevar Bush, inventor and science administrator, founder of Raytheon (BS, 1913; MS, 1913)

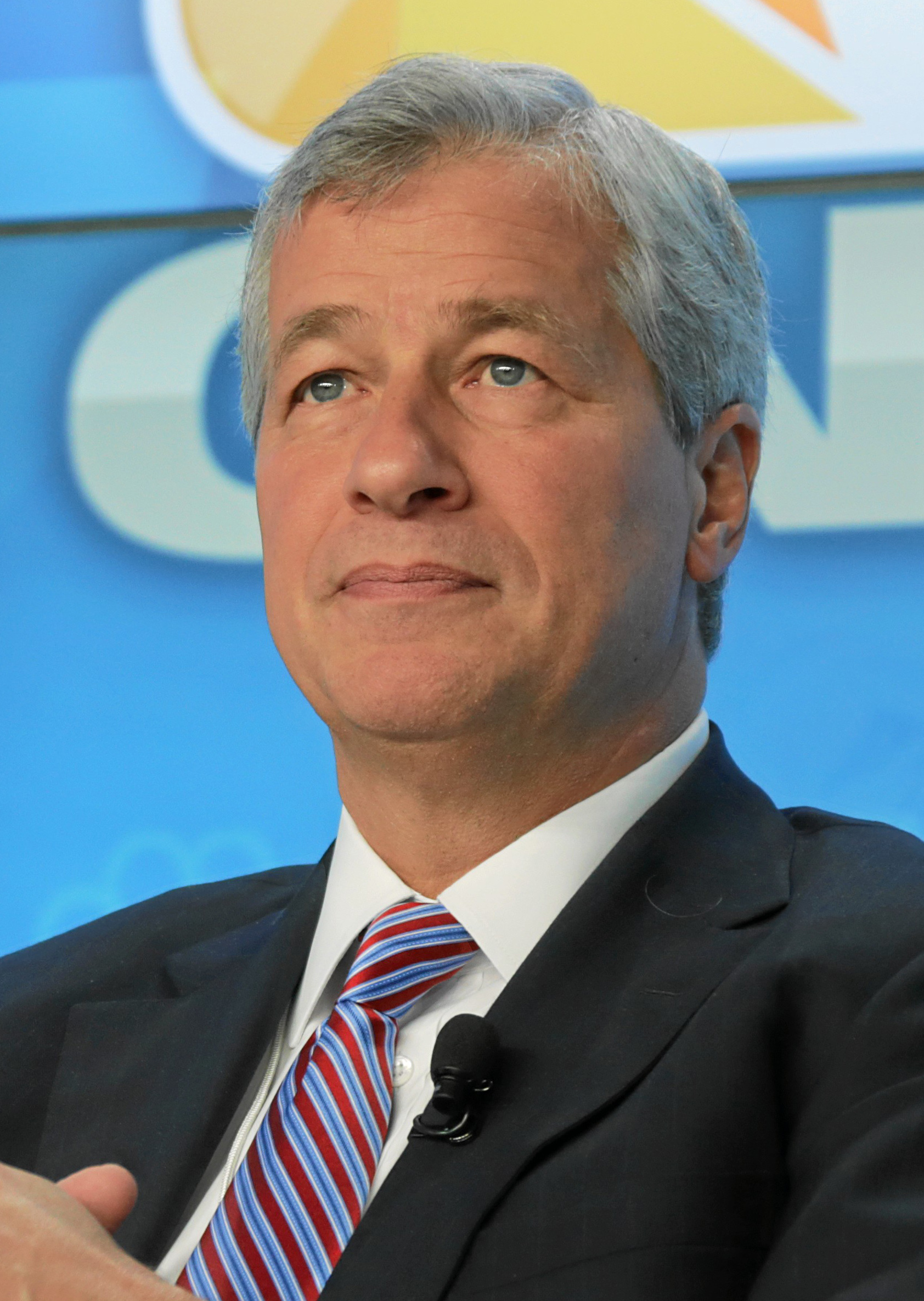
Jamie Dimon, CEO of JPMorgan Chase (BA, 1978)

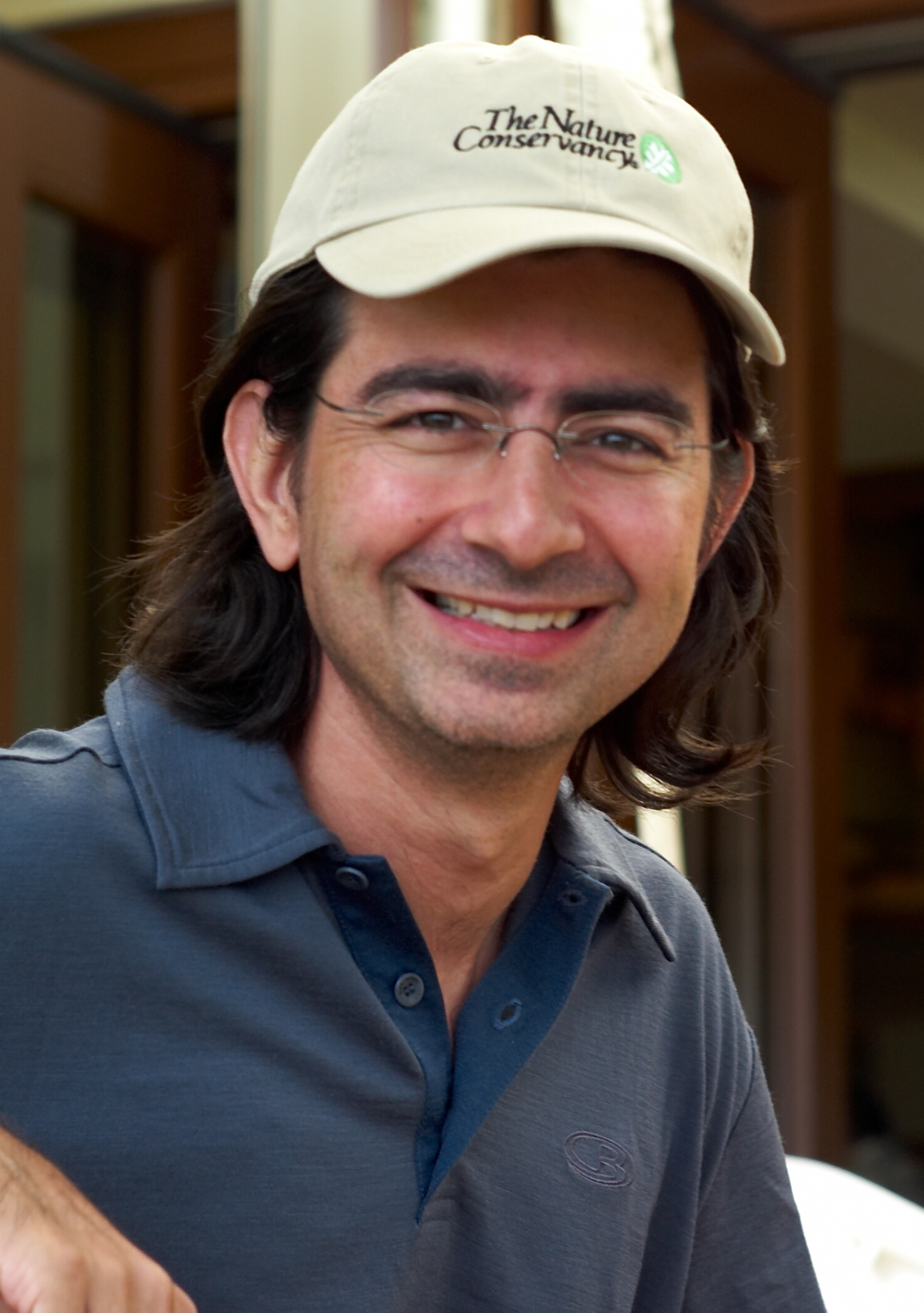
Pierre Omidyar, founder of eBay (BS, 1988)

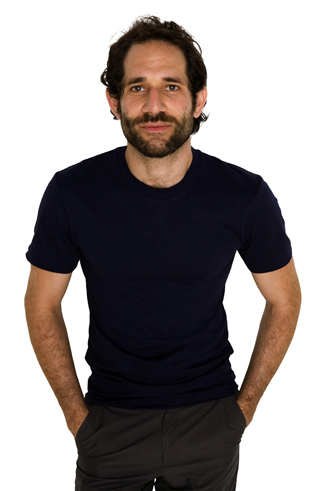
Dov Charney, Founder and CEO of American Apparel (attended, no degree)

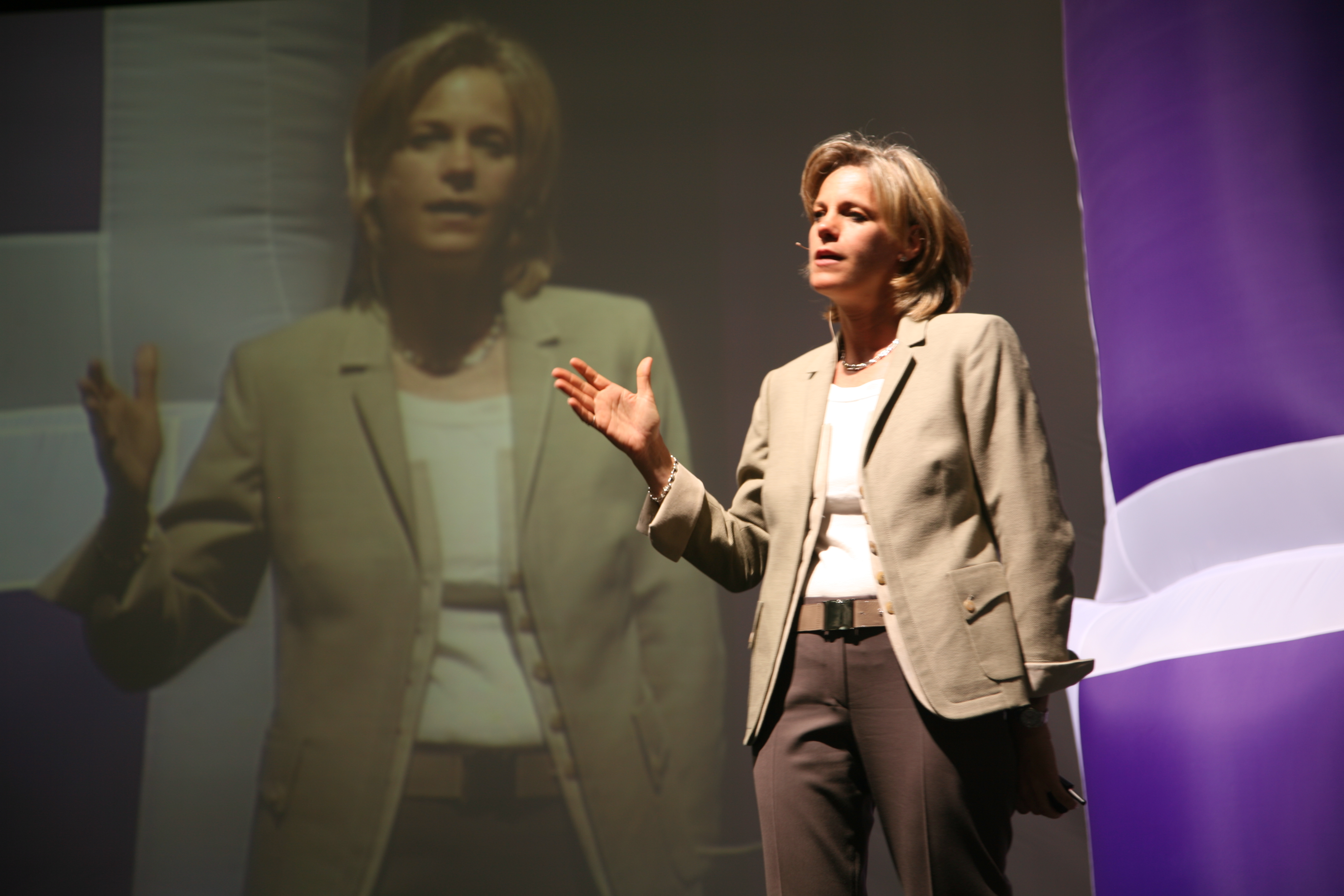
Susan Decker, Former president of Yahoo! Inc. (BS, 1984)

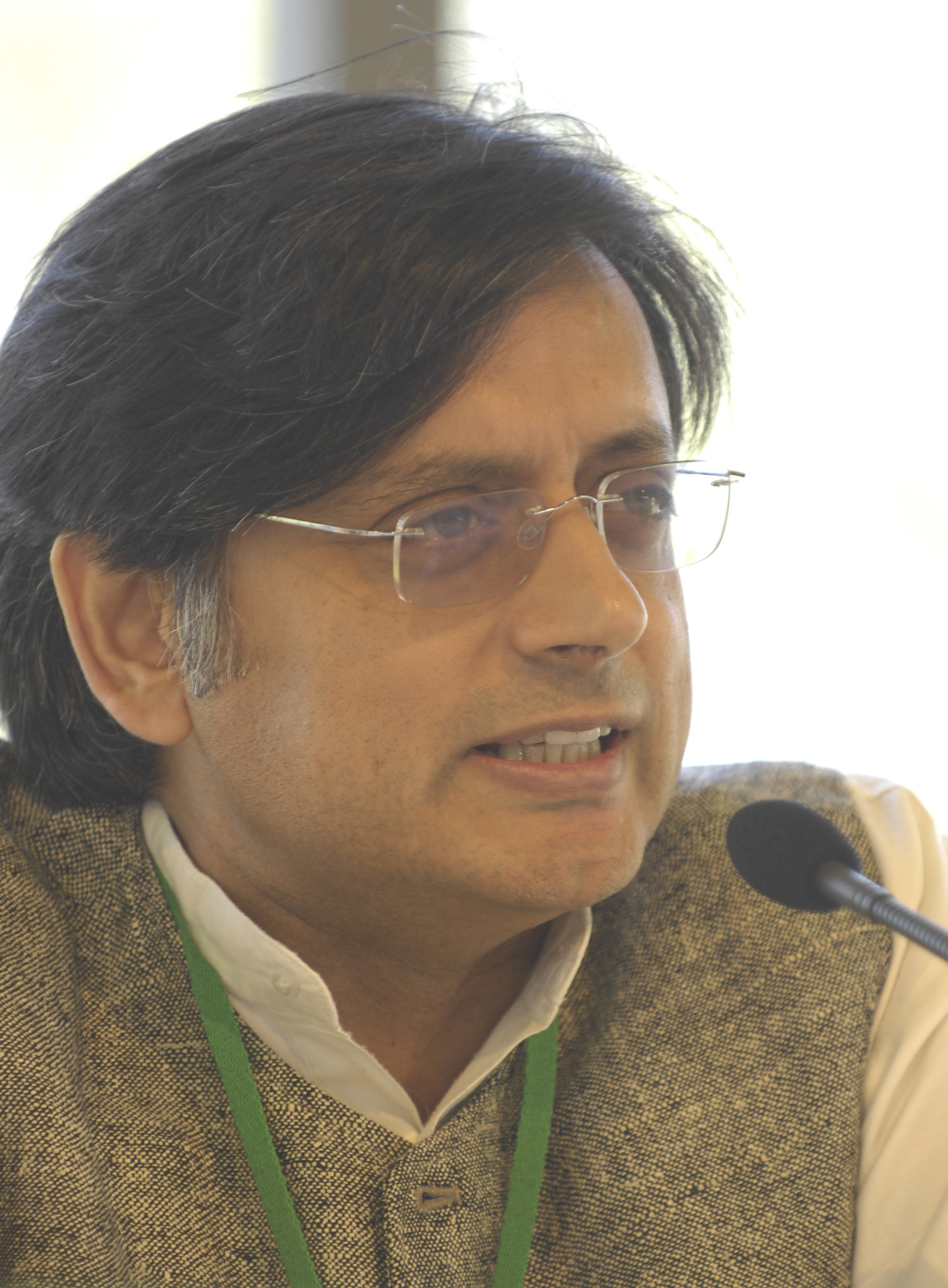
Shashi Tharoor, former Under-Secretary-General of the United Nations (MA, 1976; PhD, 1978)

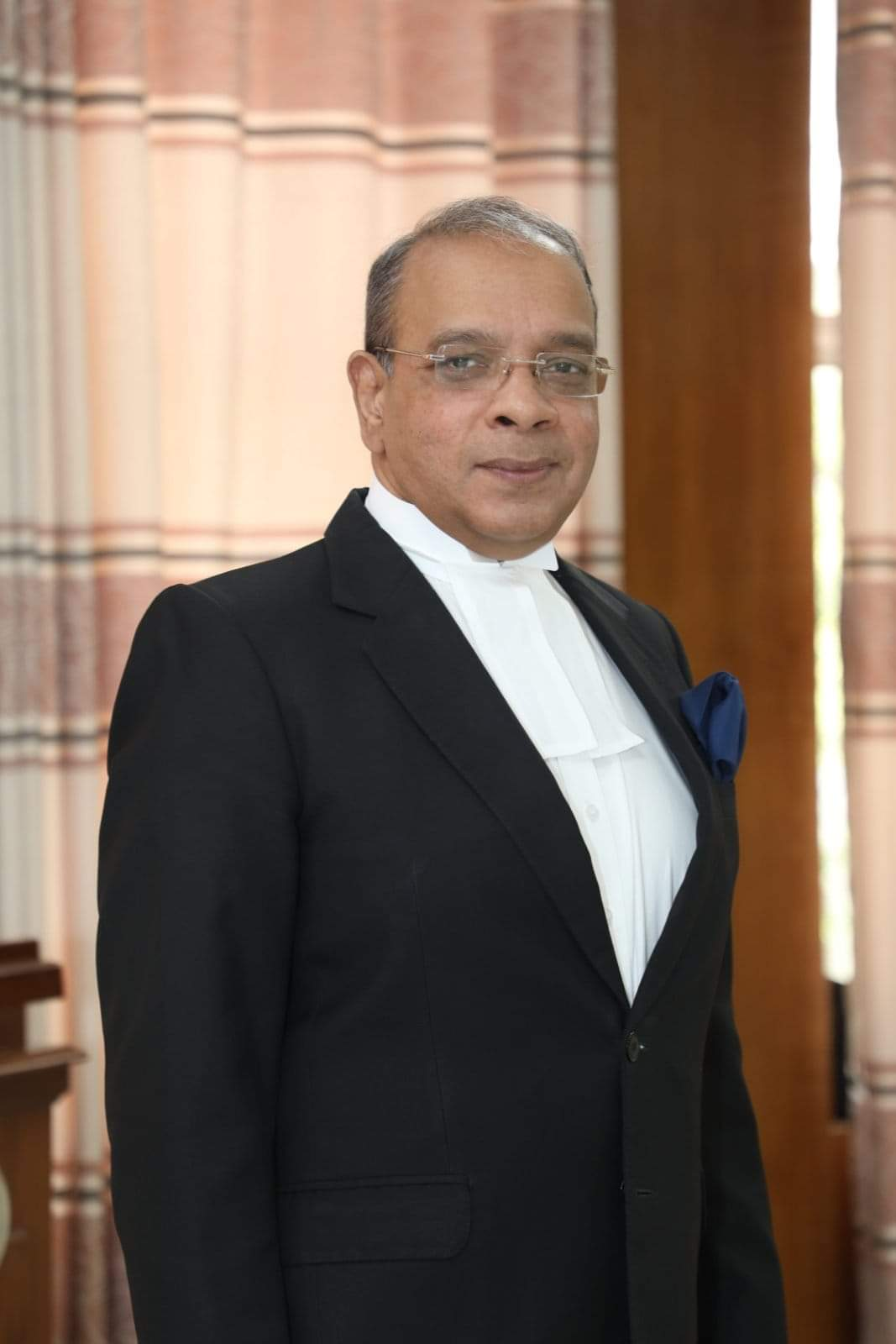
Syed Refat Ahmed, 25th Chief Justice of Bangladesh (MALD, 1990; PhD, 1999)

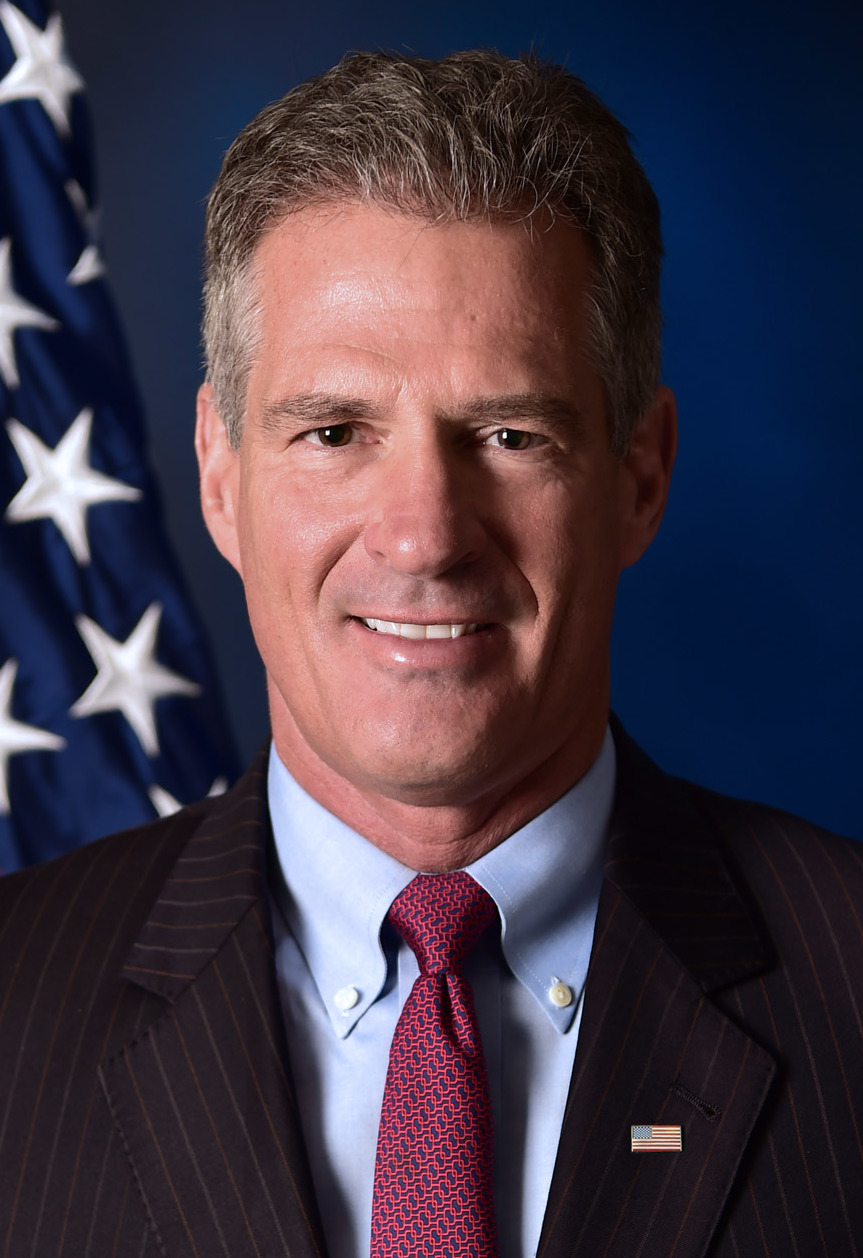
Scott Brown, Diplomat and United States Senator for Massachusetts (BA, 1981)

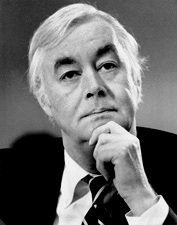
Daniel Patrick Moynihan, U.S. Senator from New York (BS, 1948; MA, 1949; PhD, 1961)

== See also ==
- The Edward R. Murrow Forum on Issues in Journalism
- The Fletcher Forum of World Affairs
- PRAXIS: The Fletcher Journal of Human Security
- Tufts Historical Review
- Tuftsin
- Tufts Jumbos football
- Tufts Daily
- Tufts Observer
- Tufts OpenCourseWare
- Tufts Pass
- University Press of New England
