= Jonathan M. Tisch College of Civic Life =

University college in the United States of America, founded in 2000

Coordinates: 42.407°N 71.118°W

The Jonathan M. Tisch College of Civic Life (originally the University College of Citizenship and Public Service, or UCCPS) is a college of Tufts University in Medford, Massachusetts. The college was founded with the aid of a $10 million donation by eBay founder Pierre Omidyar and his wife Pam in 2000 to encourage students to perform volunteer and public services for the community.

In 2006, the school was renamed after a $40 million gift from Jonathan Tisch, CEO of Loews Hotels and Loews Corporation and a trustee of Tufts University.

In June 2013, the university announced the selection of alumnus Alan Solomont, US Ambassador to Spain, as the new dean of the Tisch College. According to The Boston Globe, Amb. Solomont, who previously worked as a healthcare entrepreneur and served as National Finance Chairman of the Democratic National Committee, "has a reputation for being one of the Democratic Party’s most fruitful fundraisers."
