= List of presidents of Tufts University =

The president of Tufts University is the chief administrator of the university and is appointed by the chair of the Board of Trustees of Tufts College. The president is appointed by the board who leads and directs the university. The current incumbent is Sunil Kumar.

== Presidents of Tufts ==
The following persons have served as president of Tufts University:

No.	Image	President	Tufts class	Term start	Term end	Ref.
1		Hosea Ballou II (Note: Tufts College is established in Medford, MA (1852) on Walnut Hill.) (1796–1861)	–	1853	1860	
acting		Oliver Dean (Note: founded Dean Academy in 1865) (1783–1871)	–	1860	1862	
2		Alonzo Ames Miner (Note: Expansion and Civil War) (1814–1895)	–	1862	1875	
3		Elmer Hewitt Capen (Note: First alum to be president) (1838–1905)	1860	1875	March 22, 1905 (Note: Died in office)	
4		Frederick W. Hamilton (Note: Jackson College for Women founded) (1860–1940)	1860	1905	1912	
acting		William Leslie Hooper (1855–1918)	1877	1912	1914	
5		Hermon Carey Bumpus (1862–1943)	1905	1915	1919	
6		John Albert Cousens (Note: Fletcher School of Law and Diplomacy founded) (1874–1937)	1898	1919	July 2, 1937	
acting		George Stewart Miller (1884–1971)	1906	1937	1938	
7		Leonard Carmichael (1898–1973)	1920	1938	1952	
8		Nils Yngve Wessell (1914–2007)	–	1953	1966	
acting		Leonard Chapin Mead (1913–2002)	–	September 1, 1966	1967	
9		Burton Crosby Hallowell (1915–2006)	–	1967	June 30, 1976	
10		Jean Mayer (1920–1993)	–	July 1, 1976	August 31, 1992	
11		John A. DiBiaggio (1932–2020)	–	September 1, 1992	August 31, 2001	
12		Lawrence S. Bacow (1951–)	–	September 1, 2001	July 31, 2011	
13		Anthony Monaco (Note: Tufts acquires the School of the Museum of Fine Arts) (1959–)	–	August 1, 2011	June 30, 2023	
14		Sunil Kumar	–	July 1, 2023	present	

Table notes:
