= Lawrence Bacow =

Retired President of Harvard University (born 1951)

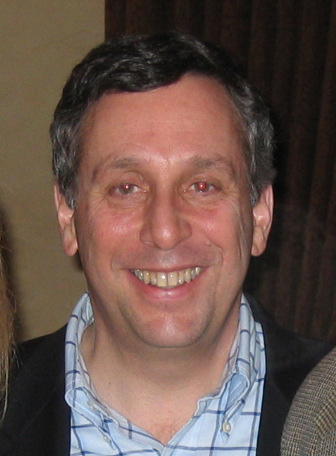
- Bacow pictured in 2006

29th President of Harvard University
- In office July 1, 2018 – June 30, 2023
- Preceded by: Drew Gilpin Faust
- Succeeded by: Claudine Gay

12th President of Tufts University
- In office September 1, 2001 – July 29, 2011
- Preceded by: John A. DiBiaggio
- Succeeded by: Anthony Monaco

3rd Chancellor of the Massachusetts Institute of Technology
- In office August 1, 1998 – June 30, 2001
- President: Charles M. Vest
- Preceded by: Paul E. Gray (1980)
- Succeeded by: Phillip Clay

Personal details
- Born: Lawrence Seldon Bacow; August 24, 1951 (age 75) Detroit, Michigan, U.S.
- Spouse: Adele Fleet
- Children: 2
- Education: Massachusetts Institute of Technology (BS); Harvard University (JD, MPP, PhD)

Academic background
- Thesis: Regulating Occupational Hazards through Collective Bargaining (1978)

Academic work
- Discipline: Public policy
- Institutions: Massachusetts Institute of Technology; Tufts University; Harvard University

Lawrence Seldon Bacow (/ˈbækaʊ/; born August 24, 1951) is an American economist and retired university administrator. Bacow served as the 12th president of Tufts University from 2001 to 2011 and as the 29th president of Harvard University from 2018 to 2023. Before that, he was the Hauser leader-in-residence at the Center for Public Leadership at Harvard Kennedy School.

Bacow began his academic career in 1977 at Massachusetts Institute of Technology (MIT), where he was a professor of environmental studies in the Department of Urban Studies and Planning before becoming the department's chair and ultimately the university's chancellor. After serving as president of Tufts, he joined the Harvard Graduate School of Education and was a member of one of Harvard University's governing boards, the President and Fellows of Harvard College.

On June 8, 2022, Bacow announced he would be leaving the presidency of Harvard in June 2023 after five years in office. In December 2022, the Harvard Corporation announced that Claudine Gay would succeed him as Harvard's 30th president.

== Early life and education ==
Bacow was born on August 24, 1951, in Detroit, Michigan, to Jewish parents. His mother emigrated from Europe at age 19 after World War II and was the only member of her family to survive Auschwitz. His father was brought to the United States from Belarus as a child to escape pogroms. Bacow grew up in Pontiac, Michigan, where he was a member of the Boy Scouts of America and became an Eagle Scout. The organization recognized him with its Distinguished Eagle Scout Award later in life.

Bacow attended Andover High School in Bloomfield Hills, Michigan. He then received his S.B. in economics from the Massachusetts Institute of Technology, where he was a member of the Jewish fraternity Zeta Beta Tau. He received a J.D. from Harvard Law School, a M.P.P. from Harvard Kennedy School, and his Ph.D. in public policy from Harvard Graduate School of Arts and Sciences.

== Career ==
=== Massachusetts Institute of Technology ===
Bacow began his academic career at the Massachusetts Institute of Technology (MIT), where he served as a professor for 24 years, ultimately being appointed department chair and chancellor. Upon completion of graduate school in 1977, he returned to MIT to teach in the department of urban studies and planning, becoming the Lee and Geraldine Martin Professor of Environmental Studies. He co-founded and was the first director of MIT's Center for Real Estate. As chancellor, he oversaw undergraduate and graduate education, student life, admissions, financial aid, athletics, campus planning, and MIT's industrial and international partnerships. He was elected a Fellow of the American Academy of Arts and Sciences in 2003.

=== Tufts University ===
On September 1, 2001, Bacow was elected the 12th president of Tufts University.

At Tufts, Bacow opposed graduate students' and technical and clerical employees' unionization efforts, which led to a student protest culminating in a student-led takeover of an administration building. On February 8, 2010, in an email to Tufts' student body, Bacow announced he would step down as president in June 2011. On March 1, 2010, then U.S. President Barack Obama appointed Bacow to the board of advisors for the White House Initiative on Historically Black Colleges and Universities. Bacow received $2,182,717 in compensation in 2011.

=== Harvard University ===
On May 25, 2011, Bacow was named a member of the President and Fellows of Harvard College, one of the boards charged with guiding Harvard University's endeavors and initiatives. For about a month, until his resignation from Tufts, he had governance responsibilities at both Tufts and Harvard.

In 2006, Bacow was mentioned in The Chronicle of Higher Education as a possible candidate to succeed Lawrence Summers as president of Harvard University; Tufts' public relations director issued a statement asserting that Bacow was happy at Tufts and came there with the expectation that it "would be his last position and that's still his expectation".

Bacow was initially a member of the Presidential Search Committee assembled to find Harvard's next president soon after Drew Gilpin Faust, Harvard's 28th president, announced her retirement. On February 11, 2018, Bacow was selected from 700 candidates as Harvard's 29th president effective July 1, 2018.

Bacow was inaugurated in a Harvard Yard ceremony on October 5, 2018, three months after officially taking on presidential duties. The ceremony was attended by Massachusetts Governor Charlie Baker and MIT President Leo Rafael Reif. Youth Poet Laureate Amanda Gorman composed and recited a poem, "Making Mountains as We Run", for the event. In his inaugural address, Bacow said:

Throughout our history, higher education has enabled the most ambitious among us to rise economically and socially. And every step the nation has taken to print more such tickets into the middle class, and beyond, has powered our economic growth and leadership in innovation. We have to ensure that higher education remains the same economic stepping-stone for those from modest backgrounds that it was for my generation and my parents' generation. While a college education still helps to level the playing field for those who manage to graduate, the cost of entry, and of staying the course until graduation, has become daunting for many families."

Bacow began his tenure with a trip to his birthplace of Detroit and hometown of Pontiac, Michigan, where he met with students, educators, Harvard affiliates, and local leaders to emphasize what he called the "transformative power of higher education". In his presidency's early days, Bacow also went on a listening tour across the university to learn more about its people and affairs.

In 2019, Bacow traveled to China, Japan, and Hong Kong. In China, he met with CCP general secretary Xi Jinping and spoke at Peking University, where he defended academic freedom and the role universities play in what he said was their pursuit of "truth, excellence, and opportunity". Bacow supportively referenced the May Fourth Movement, a Chinese student protest movement from the early 20th century. He also read a poem written by a Uyghur, an ethnic group undergoing genocidal treatment and systematic human rights violations by China's governing Chinese Communist Party (CCP), according to both the Trump and Biden administrations and numerous human rights organizations. China's state-controlled media did not reference his comments on the Uyghurs in subsequent coverage of the event.

In 2019, Bacow wrote to U.S. Secretary of State Mike Pompeo and Acting Secretary of Homeland Security Kevin McAleenan, expressing his view that international scholars and individuals who entered the U.S. illegally at a young age and been provided various protections under DACA should not be subject to deportation and should be given U.S. work permits. He praised the Supreme Court's decision to reinstate DACA in Department of Homeland Security v. Regents of the University of California, and, alongside MIT President Leo Rafael Reif, led Harvard's successful legal challenge to Immigration and Customs Enforcement guidance issued in July 2020 that would have forbidden international students from staying in the country if they were taking online courses.

In late 2019, Bacow established the Initiative on Harvard and the Legacy of Slavery with the goal to better understand the institution's ties to slavery and how it benefited from the Atlantic slave trade, and to establish events and activities to help others at Harvard understand slavery's historical impact. In June 2020, he announced the appointment of the university's first Chief Diversity and Inclusion Officer, Sherri Charleston. The same year, his involvement in the denial of tenure of LatinX department founder Lorgia García Peña due to their on-campus activism against institutional racism and other matters was the subject of an article in The New Yorker.

Bacow has called climate change "the most consequential threat facing humanity". In April 2020, he announced that investments in Harvard's endowment would be greenhouse gas-neutral by 2050. In September 2021, he announced that the endowment would no longer make new direct investments in the fossil fuel industry, and that its legacy indirect investments were in what he called "runoff mode". The university pledged to make all campus activities fossil fuel-neutral by 2026 and eliminate fossil fuel use entirely by 2050. In September 2021, Bacow appointed Harvard's first Vice Provost for Climate and Sustainability, James Stock.

Bacow has defended Harvard's position in Students for Fair Admissions vs. Harvard, a case the Supreme Court agreed to hear in January 2022, that the university should be permitted to consider race as a factor in its process of considering applicants for admission. In a statement about the case, Bacow said:

"The Supreme Court decision to review the unanimous decisions of the lower federal courts puts at risk 40 years of legal precedent granting colleges and universities the freedom and flexibility to create diverse campus communities. Considering race as one factor among many in admissions decisions produces a more diverse student body which strengthens the learning environment for all. The US Solicitor General rightfully recognized that neither the district court's factual findings, nor the court of appeals' application of the Supreme Court's precedents to those findings, warrants further review. Harvard will continue to defend vigorously its admissions practices and to reiterate the unequivocal decisions of those two federal courts: Harvard does not discriminate; our practices are consistent with Supreme Court precedent; there is no persuasive, credible evidence warranting a different outcome. The University remains committed to academic excellence, expanded opportunity, and diverse educational experiences—and to the perennial work of preparing students for fruitful careers and meaningful lives."

=== Retirement ===
In June 2022, Bacow emailed the Harvard community, saying that he intended to step down as president on June 30, 2023. In the email, he wrote, "There is never a good time to leave a job like this one, but now seems right to me. Through our collective efforts, we have found our way through the pandemic. We have worked together to sustain Harvard through change and through storm, and collectively we have made Harvard better and stronger in countless ways." Bacow also wrote that he and his wife, Adele, were looking forward to spending more time with their children and grandchildren.

After the announcement, William Lee and Penny Pritzker, outgoing and incoming Senior Fellows of the Harvard Corporation, thanked Bacow for his service, saying, "Harvard could not have asked for a better, wiser, more thoughtful, dedicated, experienced, and humane leader through these times of extraordinary challenge and change."

=== COVID-19 ===
The COVID-19 pandemic began about a year and a half into Bacow's tenure as president. Bacow leaned heavily on health experts' advice on how the university should handle it and employed preventative measures to keep university infection rates low. Under his leadership, the university revisited the quality of air filtration systems throughout classrooms and campus buildings and instituted regular testing protocols. Harvard was one of the first higher education institutions to announce a move to remote classes, on March 10, 2020.

On March 24, 2020, Bacow and his wife tested positive for SARS-CoV-2, the virus that causes COVID-19. In an interview with Harvard Gazette, Bacow described surprise at the diagnosis, claiming he and his wife had been completely isolated in their house for close to ten days before experiencing symptoms. The university's student newspaper, The Harvard Crimson, found that the Bacows had actually asked Harvard custodians to clean their house well into the first wave of the pandemic for four hours, twice a week, up until ten days after Harvard shut down and three days before they began experiencing symptoms. Shortly after the Bacows tested positive for COVID-19, both custodians who had been cleaning his house also began experiencing symptoms of the disease.

The university maintained its financial health throughout the pandemic, which some attribute to Bacow, who sought to equip the university for economic recessions resembling the 2008 Great Recession. Harvard Corporation member Kenneth Chenault said Bacow's leadership and expertise "positioned Harvard very well to manage through this crisis." Harvard's endowment reached a high of $41.9 billion in September 2020 despite financial experts predicting its campus closure in March 2020 would negatively impact its financial standing.

During the pandemic, Bacow committed to continuing regular pay and benefits for all part-time and full-time employees at Harvard regardless of whether they were able to work or were working. The university followed through and did not lay off any idle workers during the pandemic, and was fully staffed when campus operations ultimately resumed.

Infectious disease physician Sandra Bliss Nelson said, "Most of us can feel some sense of security in the reality that the Harvard community is nearly entirely vaccinated, and to date the majority of infected individuals here have experienced no symptoms at all, or mild symptoms that are resolving quickly. This is unlikely to change due to the Omicron variant. Harvard has made a decision to maintain an in-person campus in order to preserve the academic vibrancy and the emotional wellness of its community members. If a stricter isolation process remained in place, it's very likely that that Harvard could not do so."

=== Harvard and the legacy of slavery ===
In November 2019, Bacow announced that he was forming the Initiative on Harvard and the Legacy of Slavery to better understand the historical and enduring connections to slavery on the Harvard campus and in the community. The committee was chaired by Tomiko Brown-Nagin, Dean of the Radcliffe Institute for Advanced Study, and included Sven Beckert, Paul Farmer, Annette Gordon-Reed, Evelynn Hammonds, Meira Levinson, Tiya Miles, Martha Minow, Maya Sen, Daniel Smith, Davis Williams, and William Julius Wilson.

In April 2022, Bacow reported the committee's findings, acknowledging the historical significance of slavery at Harvard. The report offered several recommendations for addressing the legacy of slavery through teaching, research, and service. These include a public memorial, partnering with HBCUs, a legacy of slavery fund, and identifying current Harvard students who are descendants of slaves. Bacow accepted the proposals and committed $100 million from the Harvard Corporation to implement them, with the funds divided between current-use resources and a long-term endowment.

== Personal life ==
Bacow is an avid runner and has run five marathons. He and his wife, Adele Fleet Bacow, president of Community Partners Consultants, an urban planning firm, have two sons.

Academic offices
Vacant Title last held by Paul E. Gray; 1980	Chancellor of the Massachusetts Institute of Technology; 1998–2001	Succeeded by Phillip Clay
Preceded by John A. DiBiaggio	President of Tufts University; 2001–2011	Succeeded by Anthony Monaco
Preceded by Drew Gilpin Faust	President of Harvard University; 2018–2023	Succeeded by Claudine Gay
