= Mandell Berman =

American businessman and philanthropist

Mandell "Bill" Berman
- Receiving the 2009 Simons Prize from the Jewish Historical Society of Michigan
- Born: 1917; Detroit, Michigan
- Died: December 21, 2016; Longboat Key, Florida
- Resting place: Clover Hill park cemetery
- Education: Harvard University
- Occupation: Businessman

Mandell "Bill" Berman (1917–2016) was the businessman (housing construction industry) and philanthropist behind the Mandell L. and Madeleine H. Berman Foundation, which supports Jewish education, and research and study of the contemporary American Jewish community. His philanthropic focus was on the storage, dissemination, and preservation of Jewish data, as well as Jewish education and special education.

== Biography ==
Berman was born (1917) and grew up in Detroit, Michigan, one of four siblings. His mother was from Toledo, OH, descended of Eastern European Jewish immigrants. His father immigrated from Poland at a young age, and with a grade school education, served in the American Army as an officer and worked as a successful businessman. Berman was raised in a religiously traditional home but was allowed to spend money and travel on shabbat to get to Hebrew school and religious services. He married Madge, née Madeleine Brodie, in 1950. They have two children and three grandchildren.

== Education ==
Berman attended Detroit Central High School and Shaarey Tzedek High School. He briefly attended the University of Michigan, but then completed his undergraduate studies at Harvard College in 1940 graduating Magna Cum Laude, and graduated Harvard Business School in 1942. In 2011, he received an honorary Doctorate of Laws degree from Wayne State University in Detroit, MI.

== Career ==
Past:

- President: Bert L. Smokler & Company (1946–1975), Dreyfus Development Corporation (1969–19872), South Eastern Michigan Builders Association
- Partner: Bert L. Smokler & Company (1946–1975)
- Chairman of the Skillman Foundation
- Chairman: Board of Trustees of the Michigan State Housing Finance Authority, Supervisory Board of Euroad
- Board member: Dreyfus Corporation (NYSE), Guardian Industries (NYSE), Lennar Corporation (NYSE)

Berman also served 4 years in the United States Navy, including a posting in Okinawa.

== Philanthropic work ==
=== Selected supported projects ===
- The Berman Jewish Policy Archive @ Stanford University (BJPA)
- The North American Jewish Data Bank (NAJDB)
- The Inter Agency Task Force on Israeli-Arab Issues (IATF)
- The Jewish Historical Society of Michigan
- The Berman Center of the Jewish Educational Service of North America (JESNA) (of which he was also the co-founder)
- The Mandell Berman Fellowship Program at Brandeis University's Cohen Center for Modern Jewish Studies
- The [https://web.archive.org/web/20110725194947/http://www.contemporaryjewry.org/resources/Berman_Fellowship.doc Mandell L. Berman Postdoctoral Research Fellow in Contemporary American Jewish Life at the Frankel Center at the University of Michigan.
- Myers-JDC-Brookdale Institute’s Center for Research on Disabilities' Mandell Berman Fund for Research on Children with Disabilities, 1999.
- The 1990 and 2000–2001 National Jewish Population Surveys
- The 2009 study on Jewish mobility.
- Berman fellowship (since 2006) at the William Davidson Graduate School of Jewish Education.
- Jewish Communal Leadership Program at the University of Michigan's School of Social Work
- Mandell L. Berman Center (1988) and Berman Fellowships (since 1997), at the University of Michigan Hillel
- The Mandell L. and Madeleine H. Berman Award for Outstanding Professional Service to the Jewish Federation of Metropolitan Detroit and its agencies.
- The Detroit Symphony Orchestra
- The Berman Center for the Performing Arts (2011) at the Jewish Community Center, Detroit
- Michigan Humane Society – The Berman Center for Animal Care in Westland
- The Berman Center for Jewish Education at Congregation Shaarey Zedek
- and many more, both in and outside of the Jewish community

=== Positions held ===
- President: Council of Jewish Federations (now the Jewish Federations of North America) (1987–1990), Executive Committee of the Metropolitan Detroit Jewish Welfare Federation, United Hebrew Schools of Detroit (1962–1995)
- Chairman: JESNA (Jewish Education Service of North America) Berman Research and Evaluation Center, Volunteer and Professional Leadership Biographies, National Jewish Population Survey 2000–01 AAJE (predecessor of JESNA), National Jewish Population Survey, Board of Overseers and executive committee of the Board of Overseers of the JCPA (Jerusalem Center for Public Affairs), Skillman Foundation, Executive Committee of the Metropolitan Detroit Jewish Welfare Federation, United Hebrew Schools of Detroit
- Honorary chairman: University of Michigan Hillel, JESNA (Jewish Education Service of North America)
- Founder: Metropolitan Detroit Jewish Welfare Federation, United Hebrew Schools (1959–1962), Jewish Historical Society of Michigan (1969)
- Member of the Board: Overseers of the William Davidson Graduate School of Jewish Education (since 1996), American Jewish Joint Distribution Committee, United Israel Appeal, the Jewish Agency for Israel, Skillman Foundation, World Zionist Education Authority, United Way, Executive Committee of the Metropolitan Detroit Jewish Welfare Federation, HIAS (Hebrew Immigrant Aid Society), JDC (American Jewish Joint Distribution Committee), UIA (United Israel Appeal)
- Fellow of the American Academy of Arts and Sciences

== Awards ==
- Association for the Social Scientific Study of Jewry first Lifetime Achievement award for his support of the study of the North American Jewish community, December 19, 2010.
- Jewish Historical Society of Michigan Leonard N. Simons History Award, 2009
- Mesorah Award for Outstanding Leadership in Jewish Education, JESNA (Jewish Education Service of North America), 1992
- Jewish Federation of Metropolitan Detroit Butzel Award, 1978
- Honorary Doctorate of Laws degree, Wayne State University, Detroit, Michigan
