= Stephen Gange =

U.S. statistician, epidemiologist, and academic administrator

Stephen Gange is an American statistician, epidemiologist, and academic administrator of Johns Hopkins University. He is a professor of epidemiology at the Johns Hopkins Bloomberg School of Public Health and has a joint appointment in the Johns Hopkins School of Medicine.

He has made contributions to the fields of epidemiology and biostatistics, in a spectrum of basic, clinical/behavioral, population, and policy sciences. He has been a scientific leader with large national and international HIV studies, including the MACS/WIHS Combined Cohort Study and the North American AIDS Cohort Collaboration on Research and Design (NA-ACCORD). Methodologically, he has made contributions to describing the patterns, predictors, effectiveness and optimal timing of therapies, modeling and evaluating the predictive value of longitudinal disease markers, and methods for evaluating and modeling competing risks.

Gange has been active in advisory panels, including a member of the AIDS Clinical Studies and Epidemiology Study Section, co-chair of the Office of AIDS Research Planning Workshop for Natural History and Epidemiology, more than ten clinical trial safety monitoring boards, and as a statistician on the US DHHS Panel on Antiretroviral Guidelines for Adults and Adolescents. He served on the editorial board of JAIDS: Journal of Acquired Immune Deficiency Syndromes, AIDS Research and Therapy, and Treatment Strategies-AIDS.

== Professional Biography ==
Gange earned a B.S. from Cornell University and Ph.D. in statistics from the University of Wisconsin–Madison under Professor David DeMets. He joined the faculty in the Department of Epidemiology in the Johns Hopkins Bloomberg School of Public Health in 1994 and became a tenured full professor in 2007. Between 2003 and 2004, he played a pivotal role in establishing a new epidemiology department at Amgen Inc. He has been the primary advisor to more than 25 graduate students and the primary instructor for over 15 different onsite and online courses. He was elected as the Epidemiology representative to the school's Faculty Senate in 2006 and was subsequently elected president, serving as a member of the school's Advisory Board from 2007-10.

Beginning in 2009, he served as the department's Deputy Chair and PhD program director until 2012 when he was appointed as the school's Senior Associate Dean for Academic Affairs.

In 2015, he was appointed by Provost Robert Lieberman in a newly designed university role as Executive Vice Provost for Academic Affairs of Johns Hopkins University. In this role, Gange provides leadership in academic affairs across the university, enhancing the educational experience for Johns Hopkins students, and fostering innovations in teaching and learning. He oversees the Office of International Student and Scholar Services, directs the Student Services Excellence Initiative (SSEI), and launched both the University Registrar and Student Enrollment and Accounts Management (SEAM) organizations.

Between 2020-2, he chaired the university COVID-19 Return to Campus Steering Committee and academic program continuity workgroup that was responsible for the operational and policy changes across the university. During Summer 2022, Gange stepped in to lead the Johns Hopkins Center for Talented Youth on an interim basis and help the organization navigate a challenging period after it was forced to cancel several of its flagship summer courses with little advance notice due to insufficient staffing.

Beginning May 1, 2023, with the departure of Sunil Kumar, Gange served as interim provost until Ray Jayawardhana assumed the position on October 15, 2023. He is continuing as Executive Vice Provost.

== Awards ==
In 2015, Gange was awarded the Ernest Lyman Stebbins Medal that recognizes a member of the Johns Hopkins Bloomberg School of Public Health faculty who has made extraordinary contributions to the teaching programs at the Bloomberg School over a period of at least five years. He is a fellow of the American College of Epidemiology, an elected member of the American Epidemiological Society, and an elected member of the Delta Omega Honorary Public Health Society
