= Masci =

Masci may refer to:

== People ==
- Angelo Masci, Italian writer
- Carlo Masci (born 1958), Italian politician
- Pope Nicholas IV, born Girolamo Masci, Italian Pope
- Joseph Masci, American physician

== Schools ==
- Manila Science High School, school in Manila, Philippines
- Liceo scientifico Filippo Masci, school in Chieti, Italy
