= Phillip Clay =

American academic (born 1946)

4th Chancellor of the Massachusetts Institute of Technology
- In office 2001–2010
- President: Charles M. Vest; Susan Hockfield
- Preceded by: Lawrence Bacow
- Succeeded by: Eric Grimson

Personal details
- Born: May 17, 1946 (age 80) Wilmington, North Carolina, U.S.

Academic background
- Education: University of North Carolina at Chapel Hill; Massachusetts Institute of Technology
- Thesis: The process of black suburban migration: The 1960–1970 experience (1975)

Academic work
- Discipline: Urban planning
- Institutions: Massachusetts Institute of Technology

Phillip L. Clay (born May 17, 1946) is a professor of housing policy and city planning at the Massachusetts Institute of Technology as well as chair of the Federal Reserve Bank of Boston. He is the former Chancellor of the Institute. While Chancellor, Professor Clay had oversight responsibility for graduate and undergraduate education at MIT, including cost-cutting decision-making, as well as student life, student services, international initiatives, and the management of certain of MIT's large-scale institutional partnerships. He was also the highest ranking Black administrator in the Institute's 150-year history.

A member of the MIT faculty since 1975, Professor Clay served as Associate Provost in the Office of the Provost from 1994 to 2001. He was the Head of the Department of Urban Studies and Planning from 1992 to 1994 and its Associate Department Head during 1990 to 1992. From 1980 to 1984, Professor Clay served as the Assistant Director of the Joint Center for Urban Studies of MIT and Harvard. He became Chancellor in 2001.

It was Clay, in 2007, who investigated claims that MIT's admissions dean Marilee Jones had falsified her credentials, when applying for the job. When those claims were verified, Clay asked for her resignation.

Clay is known for his work in U.S. housing policy and community-based development. In a 1987 study commissioned by the Neighborhood Reinvestment Corporation, Clay identified the market and institutional conditions contributing to the erosion of low-income rental housing and documented the need for a national preservation policy. He later served on the national commission that recommended the policy that became part of the Housing Act of 1990.

Clay is a founding member of the National Housing Trust that addresses the issue of housing preservation. He is also President of the Board of The Community Builders, Inc., the nation's largest nonprofit developer of affordable housing. He serves as member and Vice Chair of the MasterCard Foundation board and recently he was appointed to the board of trustees of the University of North Carolina at Chapel Hill. He was appointed to the board of The Kresge Foundation in 2008.

Clay is a native of Wilmington North Carolina. He received the AB degree with Honors from the University of North Carolina at Chapel Hill in 1968 and his Ph.D. in City Planning in 1975 from MIT. He resides in Boston with his wife, Cassandra.

On November 2, 2010, Clay announced he would step down as Chancellor. He was succeeded by Eric Grimson.

== Publications ==
- Neighborhood Renewal: Middle-class Resettlement and Incumbent Upgrading in American Neighborhoods
- Neighborhood Politics and Planning (with Rob Hollister)

Academic offices
| Preceded by Lawrence Bacow | 4th Chancellor of the Massachusetts Institute of Technology; 2001—2010 | Succeeded by Eric Grimson |
