= Daniel L. Nagin =

American law professor (born 1970)

Daniel Lewis Nagin
- Born: c. 1970
- Education: Cornell University; Stanford University; University of Chicago Law School
- Occupation: Academic
- Employer: Harvard Law School
- Spouse: Tomiko Brown-Nagin (m. 1998)
- Parent(s): Lawrence Nagin; Sherrie Nagin

Daniel L. Nagin (born c. 1970) is an American law professor. He is Clinical Professor of Law and the Vice Dean for Experiential and Clinical Education at the Harvard Law School.

== Early life ==
Daniel Lewis Nagin was born circa 1969. He graduated from Cornell University, where he earned a bachelor's degree. He earned a master's degree from Stanford University, and a JD from the University of Chicago Law School.

== Career ==
Nagin was an acting co-director of the Homeless Legal Assistance Project at the Legal Services Organization of Indiana in Indianapolis, Indiana. He later became a professor at the University of Virginia School of Law. He is a law professor at the Harvard Law School.

== Personal life ==
Nagin married Tomiko Brown-Nagin, a Harvard Law School professor and dean of Radcliffe Institute since 2018, in 1998.
