= George Pollak =

George Pollak (Hungarian: Gyorgy, Hebrew: אברהם יחזקאל הלוי) (January 4, 1924- July 4, 2020) was a Hungarian-born American congregational rabbi, leading Jewish educator, and communal leader. In addition to roles as a congregational rabbi, he served as the Director of Community Services, Information, and Studies for the American Association for Jewish Education and Director of the Department of Community Services and Educational Information for JESNA.

== Early life ==
Pollak was born in Debrecen, Hungary, to parents Ferenc and Nina, scions of an illustrious rabbinical family from Bonyhad, which was closely associated with Rabbi Moshe Schreiber Sofer (the Chatam Sofer) of the Pressburg Yeshiva. He grew up in the village Rakamaz and spent his teenage years in Nyiregyhaza. Because of the anti-Jewish laws passed between 1938 and 1944 his family had a difficult time financially and he could not afford to attend high school, known in Hungary as Gymnasium. He therefore worked and studied on his own taking the year-end exam as an external student at the Nyiregyhaza Evangelical Kossuth Lajos gimnázium. Similarly due to the numerus clausus restrictions and the fact that he had to work to help his family financially he was not able to pursue higher education options at that time.

== Holocaust, concentration camps and liberation ==
The Nazis invaded Hungary on March 19, 1944, when Pollak was 20 years old. His father sent his two brothers to live with relatives in Budapest, but Pollak stayed with his family. By April all Jews were forced to wear yellow stars and shortly thereafter all Jews were forcibly removed from their homes and sent to live in an enclosed ghetto. This included Pollak and his family, together with the 17,500 Jews of Nyiregyhaza. In the space of 6 weeks from May 15 and July 9, 1944, approximately 437,000 Hungarian Jews were deported in cattle trains to concentration camps in Austria and Germany, among them Pollak his father, mother, and sister.

They reached Auschwitz on June 6, 1944, and his sister and mother were immediately killed in the gas chambers. He and his father were sent to Mauthausen, arriving on June 13, 1944. They worked as slave laborers digging out tunnels so that the Germans could set up factories out of reach of the Allied bombs. Pollak was freed from the Ebensee sub-camp of Mauthausen when it was liberated on May 7, 1945, by the 80th Division of the U.S. Army. None of his family, besides one brother, survived.

After liberation Pollak moved to Budapest where he began rabbinical school studies at Országos Rabbiképző – Zsidó Egyetem, the Jewish Theological Seminary studies. In parallel he studied at Pazmany Peter Catholic University from1946-1949. With the approach of the communists and its perceived risks, Pollak and his wife, Vera, whom he married in 1947, left Hungary for Canada in 1949.

== Education ==
To support himself Pollak worked as a rabbi/teacher in a small community in Kitchener, Ontario and completed his undergraduate studies at Waterloo College, an affiliate of the University of Western Ontario in Waterloo, Ontario (later Wilfrid Laurier University).

He later moved to New York to enroll in the Rabbinical School of the Jewish Theological Seminary. While there he received a master's degree in Hebrew literature and a Masters in School of Administration and Supervision from Teacher's College,Columbia University .

He was ordained by JTS as a rabbi in 1955.

Pollak received his PhD in Educational Psychology, Testing and Measurement, in 1961, from Western Reserve University (now Case Western Reserve) in Cleveland, Ohio. His PhD research topic, "Graduates of Jewish Day Schools: A Follow-up Study" was one of the first to study the impact of Jewish day school education on the religious observance and community affiliation of its graduates.

Among the key findings were: the most important motivations for later observance and involvement in the community was the desire to affiliate with the Jewish people rather than the demands of Jewish law; additional formal study and the impact of the spouse's relationship to Jewish religion were long term determinants of continued affiliation and observance. Occupation, education and parent's backgrounds were not found to be relevant factors.

== Career ==
While studying for his master's degree and rabbinical ordination Pollak worked as a Hebrew School teacher in various synagogue Hebrew schools. Upon receipt of his Masters in Administration and Supervision he became principal of the synagogue school at Congregation Beth Mordecai of Perth Amboy. Shortly afterwards he became principal of Bet Yeled in Elizabeth, New Jersey, a Zionist "folk" school, established by Labor Zionists.

His first pulpit after ordination in 1955 was at Congregation Agudas Achim in Port Jervis, NY, near several of the Jewish summer camps such as Cejwin and Young Judea.

In 1957 Pollak joined Temple on the Heights in Cleveland, Ohio as the rabbi of the Young People's Congregation, made up of young families aged younger than 36, an innovative effort to attract the younger generation to become involved in communal affairs.

Upon receipt of his PhD in 1961 he became the associate rabbi and head of the education department at Temple Beth El in Fall River, Massachusetts.

Slowly his career gravitated more into the Jewish education field, rather than rabbinics. In 1965 he was offered a position as one of four rabbis at Park Synagogue and also as the education director of the Park Synagogue Religious Schools with over 2000 enrolled students from nursery school through high school at two locations. At the time it was one of the largest synagogue schools in the United States and the position posed significant challenges in creating suitable synagogue school curricula at this time growth in American Jewish suburban life. Among the challenges were implementing Jewish educational goals in a changing time, teaching of Hebrew in afterschool programs, as well as training suitable teachers.

While in Cleveland he was also involved in community affairs, particularly as they affected youth and Jewish education. To address the issue of a paucity of trained Hebrew school teachers he worked together with Bureau of Jewish Education to launch a Sunday School teacher's training program.

He helped to establish adult education programs to provide formal Jewish education alternatives for adults, thus implementing one of the findings from his PhD research. Together with six other Conservative synagogues in Cleveland they created the Academy of Adult Jewish Studies which offered weekly lectures on a variety of Jewish topics, taught by local educators.

=== American Association of Jewish Education ===
In 1970 Pollak moved full time into the Jewish educational scene with his appointment as Director of Community Services at the AAJE.

AAJE (1939–1981) was the central coordinating body of all Jewish educational institutions in the US. One of its goals was to standardize teaching standards and curricula. It also conducted surveys and studies in various communities to help them establish/improve their Jewish educational programs. Among its members were Yeshiva University, B'nai B'rith, the United Synagogue of America, Hadassah, Religious Zionists of America, the Sholem Aleichem Folk Institute, Workmen's Circle, and the National Jewish Welfare Board.

His appointment to the AAJE enabled Pollak to take a more active role in national discussions concerning Jewish day schools, supplementary schools, educational finance, enrollment trends, teacher qualifications, and communal support for Jewish education. As director of community services he and his team of educational experts conducted surveys, evaluations, and policy studies for Jewish communities, based on requests from local leaders. He performed/supervised forty-three community studies in communities such as Springfield, MA, Washington D.C., Minneapolis, MN, Camden, NJ, New Haven, CT, and others.

The studies usually began by reviewing the existing educational facilities, interviewing teachers, administrators, parents and other community leaders. They evaluated what was working and what needed shoring up – whether altered physical facilities, improved curriculum, increased training for staff and/or attracting additional students and staff and provided a series of recommendations for the community to implement. These studies often took more than a year from the initial meetings until the written recommendations were presented to the local leadership.

In addition Pollak wrote statistical studies and published articles on Jewish education in numerous journals.

In 1981 AAJE was reorganized into a new organization, JESNA, Jewish Education Service of North America and Pollak continued as the Director of the Department of Community Services and Educational Information.

He retired in 1986.

=== Issues addressed in his writings and research ===
In his extensive writings and public addresses most often addressed the issues of:

- Strengthening Jewish identity through education
- Improving standards for Jewish schools
- Expanding professional training and certification for educators
- Increasing communal financial support for Jewish education
- Adapting Jewish schooling to demographic and social change in America
- Role of community in supporting Jewish education
- Resupplying the ranks of educational leaders

== Other roles ==
=== Academic posts ===
Adjunct Professor College of Jewish Studies in Cleveland (1965–1970)

Adjunct Professor of Education and Culture at New York University (1977–1986)

=== National Council of Jewish Education ===
President of the National Council of Jewish Education from 1979 to 1981

=== Committee on Jewish Law and Standards ===
Pollak also served on the Jewish Law and Standards Committee of the Rabbinical Assembly, which establishes halakhic (Jewish law) policy for the Conservative movement. Practical issues related to Jewish practice submitted by community rabbis are discussed and Teshuvot (responsa) are prepared. These are non-binding, but useful recommendations for pulpit rabbis.

Pollak authored response on "Synagogue Policy Concerning Bringing Foods Prepared in the Home into the Synagogue" (YD 119:7.1988) and "Blowing the Shofar After Ma'ariv Following Yom Kippur" (OH 623:6.1987). He also expressed views on the Tape Recording and Photography on Shabbat, May an Avowed Atheist Serve as a Prayer Leader?, A Teshuvah on Abortion and Joint Conservative-Reform Religious Schools.

== Honors ==
- President of the Friends of the Sir Wilfred Laurier University (1983) - Vignettes
- Doctor of Divinity, Jewish Theological Seminary, 1980, in recognition of twenty five years of service to the Jewish community and his leadership in Jewish education

== Key publications ==
- Pollak, George. The Graduates of the Jewish Day School: A Follow-up Study. Case Western Reserve University, 1961.
- Pollak, George. “The Jewish Day School Graduate.” Jew Spec (Feb. 1962): 11–14.
- Pollak, George. Ethical Considerations in the Care of the Dying Elderly Patient, Journal of Jewish Communal Services, 1966 Vol. 43/No. 2, pp 138–142 https://www.bjpa.org/search-results/publication/4835
- Pollak, George. “Curriculum Development.” RA (1975): 171–76.
- Pollak, George. “The Changing Central Agencies for Jewish Education.” Jew Ed 44 (Summer 1975): 36–41.
- Pollak, George. “The Day School in Light of Research.” Ped Rep 29 (Fall 1977).
- Pollak, George. “Back to the Basics.” Jew Ed 45 (Winter 1977): 5–9, 48.
- Pollak, George. “Adolescent Attitudes.” Ped Rep 29 (Spring 1978).
- Pollak, George. “A Vision of the Jewish Educator.” Jew Ed 48 (Summer 1980): 39–43.
- Pollak, George. Who’s Who in Jewish Education: A Profile of the Jewish Educator. N.Y.: AAJE and WZO, 1980. 105 pp.
- Pollak, George, and Gerhard Lang. The Supplementary Jewish High School. N.Y.: AAJE, 1980). 52 pp.
- Pollak, George, and Gerhardt Lang. Budget and Financing in Jewish Day Schools 1979–80–81. AAJE Bulletin 48 (May 1981).
- Pollak, George, and Gerhard Lang. “Teacher Stress in Day Schools—Does It Exist?” Jew Ed 52 (Summer 1984): 34–39.
- Pollak, George. “The Carnegie Report and Jewish Education.” Ped Rep 35 (Mar. 1984): 3–7.
- Pollak, George. “School Climate and Administration.” Ped Rep 35 (Oct. 1984): 6–8.
- Pollak, George. “Teaching Conditions in Jewish Schools.” Ped Rep 33 (Oct. 1982): 8–10.
- Pollak, George, and Israel D. Lerner. The Aged in Jewish Tradition. N.Y.: Council for Jewish Education, Apr. 1982.
- Pollak, George, and Gerhard Lang. Perceptions of Jewish Education. JESNA Research and Information Bulletin no. 55. July 1983. 50 pp.
- Pollak, George, comp. Doctoral Dissertations in Jewish Education, 1975–1982. N.Y.: JESNA Research and Information Bulletin No. 53, Jan. 1983.

== See also ==
· Michael Zeldin, A Framework for Understanding Change in Jewish Education

· Alvin Schiff, The Jewish Day School in America, The Jewish Education Committee of New York, 1966 pp 152–153

· Norman Drachler, Abraham Peck, Jacob Rader Marcus. A Bibliography of Jewish education in the United States, Wayne State University Press, 2017, ISBN 978-0-8143-4349-4

· Paul Weinberger. Effects of Jewish Education, The American Jewish Year Book, 1971, Vol. 72, p239
