= Charles Rosenberg =

Charles Rosenberg may refer to:

- Chuck Rosenberg (born 1960), former acting administrator of the Drug Enforcement Administration
- Charles E. Rosenberg (born 1936), American historian of medicine
