= Amy Cohn =

American operations researcher

Amy Ellen Mainville Cohn is an American operations researcher who applies multi-objective combinatorial optimization methods to healthcare and aviation. She works in the Department of Industrial and Operations Engineering and Department of Health Management and Policy of the University of Michigan, where she is an Alfred F. Thurnau Professor. She directs the Center for Healthcare Engineering and Patient Safety in the university's College of Engineering, and is the chief transformation officer for University of Michigan Medicine.

== Education and career ==
Cohn's mother earned a Ph.D. in physics and worked as a computer scientist; her father was a social worker. She majored in applied mathematics at Harvard University, where she graduated magna cum laude in 1991. She completed a Ph.D. in operations research at the Massachusetts Institute of Technology in 2002. Her doctoral dissertation, Composite-Variable Modeling for Large-Scale Problems in Transportation and Logistics, was supervised by Cynthia Barnhart.

Also in 2002, she became an assistant professor of industrial and operations engineering at the University of Michigan. She was tenured as an associate professor in 2009, named as a Thurnau Professor in 2011, and promoted to full professor in 2017. She became director of the Center for Healthcare Engineering and Patient Safety in 2020.

== Recognition ==
The Michigan Association of State Universities named Cohn as a 2023 Distinguished Professor of the Year. She was named as a Fellow of the Institute for Operations Research and the Management Sciences (INFORMS) in the 2024 class of fellows.
