= Cynthia Barnhart =

American civil engineer and academic (born 1959)

13th Provost of the Massachusetts Institute of Technology
- In office March 7, 2022 – July 1, 2025
- Preceded by: Martin A. Schmidt
- Succeeded by: Anantha P. Chandrakasan

6th Chancellor of the Massachusetts Institute of Technology
- In office 2014–2021
- Preceded by: W. Eric Grimson
- Succeeded by: Melissa Nobles

Personal details
- Born: 1959 (age 66–67) West Point, New York, U.S.
- Spouse: Mark Baribeau
- Education: University of Vermont (BS); Massachusetts Institute of Technology (MS, PhD)
- Scientific career
- Fields: Civil engineering
- Workplaces: Bechtel; Georgia Institute of Technology; Massachusetts Institute of Technology
- Thesis: A network-based primal-dual solution methodology for the multi-commodity network flow problem (1988)
- Doctoral students: Amy Cohn

Cynthia Barnhart (born 1959) is an American civil engineer and academic who has served as provost of the Massachusetts Institute of Technology from 2022 to 2025. She previously served as MIT's chancellor (top administrator for student life) from 2014 to 2021.

Barnhart's academic work focuses on transportation and operations research, specifically specializing in developing models, optimization methods and decision support systems for large-scale transportation problems. She also is a professor in MIT's Department of Civil and Environmental Engineering, and was an associate dean of the MIT School of Engineering, serving a brief tenure as interim dean of engineering from 2010 to 2011.

Barnhart became a member of the National Academy of Engineering in 2010 for professional leadership and contributions to optimization and transportation models, algorithms, and applications.

== Early life and education ==
Barnhart was born in West Point, New York and grew up in Barre, Vermont. She received a Bachelor of Science in civil engineering from the University of Vermont in 1981. From the Massachusetts Institute of Technology, she received a Master of Science in transportation in 1985 and a Doctor of Philosophy in civil engineering in 1988.

She spent two years working at Bechtel, a firm in Washington, D.C., as a planning engineer for the city's subway system.

== Academic career ==
After graduation, Barnhart worked as an assistant professor at the School of Industrial and Systems Engineering at Georgia Institute of Technology before returning to MIT as an assistant professor in 1992, eventually becoming a full professor in 2002. At MIT she has served as co-director of the Center for Transportation and Logistics, co-director of the Operations Research Center, and director of Transportation@MIT.

She is the Ford Foundation Professor of Engineering at the Department of Civil and Environmental Engineering, with a join appointment at the Engineering Systems Division.

Barnhart was president of the Institute for Operations Research and the Management Sciences for the 2008 term. She was appointed as the 6th Chancellor of the Massachusetts Institute of Technology in 2014, succeeding W. Eric Grimson, a professor of Computer Science and Engineering.

On May 3, 2021, it was announced that Barnhart would step down from her role as Chancellor on July 1, 2021, at which time she would return to research and teaching activities as a faculty member.

On February 10, 2022, MIT announced that Barnhart will become MIT's next Provost, effective March 7. She stepped down on July 1, 2025.

== Awards ==
- 2011 class of Fellows of the Institute for Operations Research and the Management Sciences
- INFORMS Award for the Advancement of Women in Operations Research and Management Science.
- 2003 Franz Edelman prize for excellence in operations research and management sciences (2nd-place).
- Presidential Young Investigator Award from the National Science Foundation
- Member of the National Academy of Engineering (2010)

Academic offices
Preceded by Eric Grimson	6th Chancellor of the Massachusetts Institute of Technology; 2014 – 2021	Succeeded by Melissa Nobles
