= Ellen Hildreth =

American computer scientist

- Education: Massachusetts Institute of Technology
- Known for: Marr–Hildreth algorithm
- Spouse: Eric Grimson
- Children: 2
- Awards: National Science Foundation Presidential Young Investigator Award (1987); Fellow of the Association for the Advancement of Artificial Intelligence (1994)
- Scientific career
- Fields: Computer science Cognitive science
- Workplaces: Massachusetts Institute of Technology; Wellesley College
- Thesis: The Measurement of Visual Motion (1983)
- Doctoral advisor: Shimon Ullman

Ellen Catherine Hildreth is a professor of computer science at Wellesley College. Her fields are visual perception and computer vision. She co-invented the Marr-Hildreth algorithm along with David Marr.

She completed all of her higher education at the Massachusetts Institute of Technology. She earned a Bachelor of Science in Mathematics in 1977, a Master of Science from the Department of Electrical Engineering and Computer Science (EECS) in 1980, and a Ph.D. from EECS in 1983. Her thesis, "The Measurement of Visual Motion", won an Honorable Mention from the Association for Computing Machinery.

She is a Fellow of the Association for the Advancement of Artificial Intelligence and the Institute of Electrical and Electronics Engineers.

Hildreth is married to Eric Grimson. The couple have two sons.

== Selected works ==
- Implementation of a theory of edge detection (1980)
