= Sunil Kumar (academic administrator) =

Academic administrator

14th President of Tufts University
- Incumbent
- Assumed office 1 July 2023
- Preceded by: Anthony Monaco

Provost of Johns Hopkins University
- In office 1 September 2016 – 30 April 2023
- Preceded by: Robert C. Lieberman
- Succeeded by: Ray Jayawardhana

Personal details
- Education: National Institute of Technology, Karnataka (BEng); Indian Institute of Science (MEng); University of Illinois, Urbana-Champaign (PhD)
- Scientific career
- Fields: Information technology
- Institutions: Stanford University; University of Chicago; Johns Hopkins University; Tufts University
- Thesis: Techniques for the Performance Analysis of Queueing Networks (1996)
- Doctoral advisor: Panganamala Kumar

Sunil Kumar is an Indian-born academic administrator serving as president of Tufts University since 1 July 2023. He was previously the provost and senior vice president for academic affairs at Johns Hopkins University from 2016 to 2023.

== Early life and education ==
Kumar was born in India. He is the son of a police officer. He earned a bachelor of engineering from National Institute of Technology Karnataka in 1990. In 1992, he completed a master of engineering in computer science and automation at the Indian Institute of Science. Kumar received a Ph.D. in electrical engineering from University of Illinois Urbana-Champaign in 1996.

== Career ==
Kumar worked for 14 years at Stanford Graduate School of Business. He was the Fred H. Merrill Professor of Operations, Information and Technology. He was also a senior associate dean of academic affairs and oversaw the MBA program. Kumar was later the George Pratt Shultz Professor of Operations Management at the University of Chicago Booth School of Business where he also served as the dean since 2011. On 1 September 2016, Kumar became the 15th provost of Johns Hopkins University. On 30 April 2023, he was succeeded by interim provost Stephen Gange.

On 17 November 2022, Kumar was announced as the 14th president of Tufts University, succeeding Anthony Monaco. He assumed the position on 1 July 2023, becoming the first person of color to hold the position.

Academic offices
Preceded by Anthony Monaco	14th President of Tufts University; 2023 –	Incumbent
