= Tomiko Brown-Nagin =

American legal academic

- Born: Tomiko Brown c. 1970 (age 55–56)
- Education: Furman University (BA); Yale University (JD); Duke University (PhD)
- Spouse: Daniel L. Nagin

Tomiko Brown-Nagin (born c. 1970) is an American legal scholar, historian, and academic. She is the I. James Quillen Dean of the Stanford University Graduate School of Education, a position she assumed on November 1, 2026. She was previously dean of Harvard Radcliffe Institute from 2018 to 2026, the Daniel P.S. Paul Professor of Constitutional Law at Harvard Law School, and a Harvard University professor of history.

== Early life and education ==
Brown-Nagin was born c. 1970. She graduated from Furman University, where she was named a Truman Scholar and graduated summa cum laude with a Bachelor of Arts degree in history in 1992. She earned a J.D. from Yale Law School, where she served as an editor of the Yale Law Journal, in 1997, and a Ph.D. in history from Duke University in 2002.

== Career ==
Brown-Nagin clerked for Robert L. Carter of the United States District Court for the Southern District of New York, and for Jane Richards Roth of the United States Court of Appeals for the Third Circuit. She began her career as a lawyer in private practice at Paul, Weiss, Rifkind, Wharton & Garrison in New York, and then held the Charles Hamilton Houston Fellowship at Harvard Law School and a Golieb legal history fellowship at New York University. Brown-Nagin was the T. Munford Boyd Professor of Law and Justice Thurgood Marshall Distinguished Professor of Law at the University of Virginia Law School before joining the Harvard faculty.

Brown-Nagin was appointed faculty director of Harvard Law School's Charles Hamilton Houston Institute in 2017 and served as co-director of the Law and History Program at Harvard Law School from 2013 to 2018.

In 2018, Brown-Nagin assumed the role as dean of Harvard Radcliffe Institute, a position she held until 2026. She is also the Daniel P.S. Paul Professor of Constitutional Law at Harvard Law School and a professor of history at Harvard University where she teaches courses on American legal history, constitutional law, education law and policy, and the U.S. Supreme Court and social reform.

As chair, Brown-Nagin led the Harvard Presidential Committee on Harvard & the Legacy of Slavery from 2019 to 2022. She served as coauthor of the report that “detail[ed] the University's direct, financial, and intellectual ties to slavery”. The publication of the report attracted media attention, including in the New York Review of Books and in the Washington Post.

Brown-Nagin has written and publicly spoken about constitutional law, legal history and the American civil rights movement, publishing books and articles for scholarly and popular audiences. In one article from 2014, she called on selective institutions of higher education to admit and financially support greater numbers of students who are the first in their families to attend college, an approach that she argued would attract needy students from all racial backgrounds.

In 2011, Brown-Nagin published Courage to Dissent: Atlanta and the Long History of the Civil Rights Movement (Oxford University Press, 2011), which won the 2012 Bancroft Prize in history, the Liberty Legacy Award from the Organization of American Historians, the John Phillip Reid Book Award from the American Society for Legal History, the Charles Sydnor Award from the Southern Historical Association, the Lillian Smith Book Award from the Southern Regional Council, and the Hurston/Wright Legacy Award in the category of non-fiction.

In 2022, Brown-Nagin published Civil Rights Queen: Constance Baker Motley and the Struggle for Equality (Pantheon Press, 2022), which won the 2023 Order of the Coif Book Award (American Association of Law Schools), bestowed upon “authors of outstanding publications that evidence creative talent of the highest order.” Civil Rights Queen also won the 2023 Darlene Clark Hine Award (Organization of American History), 2023 Lillian Smith Book Award (Southern Regional Council/UGA), and has been featured in NPR, PBS, Harvard Magazine, Lovely One by Justice Ketanji Brown Jackson, and other publications.

In 2020, Brown-Nagin testified before the House Oversight and Reform Subcommittee on Civil Rights and Civil Liberties that held a briefing “on how the violent treatment of protestors and journalists across the country by federal and local law enforcement have violated the First Amendment.”

Brown-Nagin was selected as a fellow of the American Academy of Arts and Sciences in 2020. She was the recipient of the Graduate School of Duke University's distinguished alumni award in 2022. Brown-Nagin was awarded an honorary doctorate in humanities from Furman University in 2023. She is a member of the board of directors of ProPublica. Brown-Nagin is also an elected member of the American Philosophical Society, American Law Institute, and the American Bar Foundation.

In August 2026, Stanford University announced that Brown-Nagin would become the I. James Quillen Dean of the Stanford University Graduate School of Education, succeeding Daniel L. Schwartz. She began the role on November 1, 2026.

== Personal life ==
In 1998, Brown-Nagin married Daniel L. Nagin, a Harvard Law School professor.

== Publications ==
- Civil Rights Queen: Constance Baker Motley and the Struggle for Equality (Pantheon Books 2022).
- "Constance Baker Motley Taught the Nation How to Win Justice", 2022 Smithsonian Magazine.
- “The Mentoring Gap: Race and Higher Education Commentary Series,” 129 Harv. L. Rev. F. 303 (2016).
- Reconsidering the Insular Cases: The Past and Future of American Empire (Harvard University Press, 2015) (co-edited with Gerald Neuman).
- "Two Americas in Healthcare: Federalism and Wars over Poverty from the New Deal-Great Society to Obamacare," 62 Drake L. Review (2014).
- “Rethinking Proxies for Economic Disadvantage: A First Generation Students’ Project,” 2014 U. Chi. Legal F. 433 (Fall 2014).
- "The Diversity Paradox: Judicial Review in an Age of Demographic and Educational Change" 65 Vanderbilt Law Review En Banc 113 (2012)
- Courage to Dissent: Atlanta and the Long History of the Civil Rights Movement (Oxford University Press 2011).
- "Elites, Social Movements, and the Law: The Case of Affirmative Action", 105 Columbia Law Review 1436 (2005).
- "Race as Identity Caricature: A Local Legal History Lesson in the Salience of Intra-Racial Conflict", 151 University of Pennsylvania Law Review 1913 (2003).
