= Anthony Monaco =

American academic administrator & scientist (born 1959)

Anthony P. Monaco

13th President of Tufts University
- In office August 2011 – June 30, 2023
- Preceded by: Lawrence Bacow
- Succeeded by: Sunil Kumar

Personal details
- Born: October 10, 1959 (age 66) Wilmington, Delaware, U.S.
- Education: Princeton University; Harvard University

Anthony P. Monaco (born October 10, 1959) is an American geneticist and university administrator. He was the 13th president of Tufts University from 2011 to 2023.

== Life ==
Monaco was born in Wilmington, Delaware, and graduated from the Salesianum School in 1977. He earned an undergraduate degree as an independent concentrator in neuroscience and behavior at Princeton University in 1981 and played goalie on their men's water polo team.

Monaco earned a Ph.D. in Neurobiology in 1987 and his M.D. in 1988 in a joint program from Harvard University. His doctoral research, supervised by Louis M. Kunkel, led to his landmark discovery of the gene responsible for X-linked Duchenne and Becker muscular dystrophy. He subsequently completed a postdoctoral fellowship in London, where he worked on the Human Genome Project at the Imperial Cancer Research Fund (now Cancer Research UK), and subsequently a faculty position at the Institute of Molecular Medicine of the University of Oxford. Monaco identified the first gene specifically involved in human speech and language. Nobel Prize-winning biologist Paul Nurse once stated "Tony Monaco was among the first to recognize the importance of what was still an emerging research frontier, human genetics, and its vast potential to address problems such as cancer and autism."

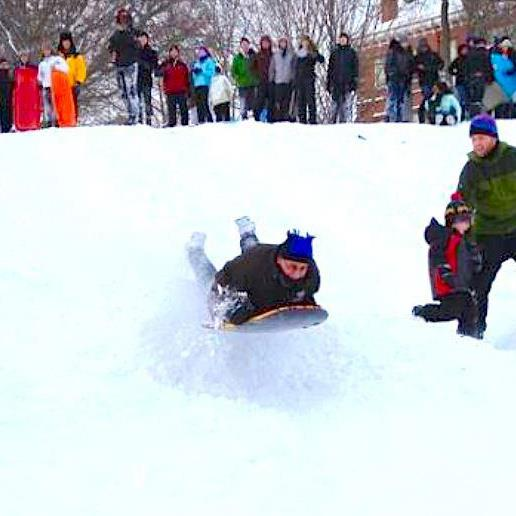
Monaco sledding on campus, 2013

Monaco held a series of administrative positions at Oxford, the last being Pro-Vice-Chancellor (Planning and Resources), prior to being appointed President of Tufts University. He was also the Head of the Neurodevelopmental and Neurological Disorders Group at the Wellcome Trust Centre for Human Genetics.

Monaco assumed the office of President of Tufts University in August 2011 from Lawrence Bacow. On February 14, 2022, Monaco announced that he would step down as president in summer 2023. His successor, Sunil Kumar, was announced on November 17, 2022 and assumed office on July 1, 2023.

Academic offices
Preceded by Lawrence Bacow	13th President of Tufts University; 2011 – 2023	Succeeded by Sunil Kumar
