= Joseph Masci =

American physician, educator and author (1950–2022)

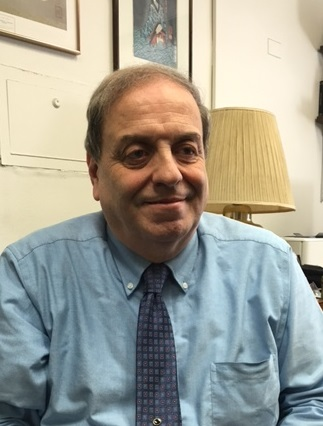
- Born: November 27, 1950; New Brunswick, New Jersey, U.S.
- Died: November 15, 2022 (aged 71); Manhasset, New York, U.S.
- Occupations: Physician; educator; author
- Organization(s): Icahn School of Medicine; Elmhurst Hospital Center

Joseph Masci (November 27, 1950 – November 15, 2022) was an American physician, educator and author based in Elmhurst, New York City. He was Professor of Medicine (infectious diseases), Professor of Environmental Medicine and Public Health and Professor of Global Health at the Icahn School of Medicine at Mount Sinai. He served as the Director of Department of Medicine at the Elmhurst Hospital Center from 2002 through 2017, when he became Chairman of the Department of Global Health, a position he held until his death in 2022.

During his career, Masci contributed extensively to helping patients with AIDS and TB through research, books and projects. His work also focused on disaster preparedness and bioterrorism.

== Early life and education ==
Masci was born on November 27, 1950, in New Brunswick, New Jersey. He earned his bachelor's degree from Cornell University in 1972 and his medical degree from New York University School of Medicine in 1976. He completed his residency in internal medicine at Boston City Hospital and fellowship in infectious disease at Mount Sinai.

== Career ==
Following the completion of his residency, he joined the Boston University School of Medicine as an instructor in medicine in 1979 and taught there until 1980. Simultaneously, he worked at the Boston City Hospital as Assistant Visiting Physician. In 1982, after completing his fellowship at Mount Sinai, he joined Elmhurst Hospital Center as an attending physician in infectious diseases in the Department of Medicine. He was promoted to the position of Associate Director in 1987 and to the position of Director of Department in 2002. In December 2017, he became the first Chairman of the Department of Global Health.

Much of his initial work and research was focused on AIDS. He contributed significantly in designing services in New York City for people with AIDS. In 1997, he was appointed chairman of the health services work group of the New York City HIV Planning council and served there until 2003. He was also involved with the New York State Department of Health AIDS Institute in various roles. He served as clinical co-chairman of the New York City Health + Hospitals HIV directors council and is a member of the New York City Commission on AIDS.

After the terrorist attacks of September 11, 2001 much of his work involved emergency preparedness planning for New York State and hospitals in the region. He served on the Weapons of Mass Destruction advisory group of the New York City Department of Health and Mental Hygiene as well as of the Bioterrorism Task Force in the Office of the Mayor, City of New York. In 2001, he was appointed chairman of the HHC Emergency Preparedness council and became an advisor on bioterrorism to its president. He left these positions in 2010, and began to refocus his work on AIDS, TB and later on Ebola and, beginning in 2020 on COVID-19 infection as the subject matter expert and research committee chair of the NYC Health and Hospitals Corporation.

Masci was on the faculty of the Icahn School of Medicine at Mount Sinai from 1982 until his death. In 2003, he became a Professor of Medicine, infectious disease. From 1999 to 2002, he was the director of second year curriculum at Mount Sinai. He served as a visiting professor at the Pavlov University Medical School in St. Petersburg, Russia from 2009 to 2012. He has also served as project coordinator and technical lead on HIV-focused clinical partnerships in Ethiopia and Russia between 2004 and 2014 .

Masci was the lead scientist in several research projects and collaborated with scientists on many others. Fifteen of his research projects were grant-funded. During his career, he was on the editorial boards at The American Journal of Medicine, Journal of HIV/AIDS Research and Therapy and American Journal of Bioterrorism, Biosecurity and Biodefense. He was a fellow of the American College of Physicians, the New York Academy of Medicine, the American College of Chest Physicians and the Royal Society of Medicine.

== Books ==
Masci authored or co-authored seven books, and edited or co-edited thirteen. His first book, Primary and Ambulatory Care of the HIV-infected Adult, was published in 1992. The book was named to the Brandon-Hill list as an essential purchase for small medical libraries. In 1996, he published Outpatient Management of HIV Infection. Second and third editions of the book were published in 1997 and 2001, respectively. In 2001, the book was selected by the American Academy of Family Physicians as a core text for all residency programs. Masci also co-authored Bioterrorism: A Guide for Hospital Preparedness, published in 2005. In 2017, Ebola: Clinical Patterns, Public Health Concerns, a textbook he co-authored with Elizabeth Bass, was published.

In 2011, Masci wrote the fourth edition of Outpatient Management of HIV Infection, which was included by the World Health Organization for the List of Basic Sources in English for a Medical Faculty Library.

== Partial bibliography ==
=== As an author ===
- Primary and Ambulatory Care of the HIV-infected Adult. 1992.
- Outpatient Management of HIV Infection. 1996.
- Outpatient Management of HIV Infection, second edition (Japanese revised edition). 1997.
- Outpatient Management of HIV Infection, third edition. 2001.
- Bioterrorism: A Guide for Hospital Preparedness. 2005 (with Elizabeth Bass)
- Outpatient Management of HIV Infection, fourth edition. 2011.
- Ebola: Clinical Patterns, Public Health Concerns. 2017. (with Elizabeth Bass)

=== As an editor ===
- Ferri's Clinical Advisor: Instant Diagnosis and Treatment. 1999 – 2011.
- Infectious Diseases Supplement to Human Diseases and Conditions. 2003.

== Awards and honors ==
- 1990 – The Solomon Berson Award, Mount Sinai School of Medicine, Department of Medicine
- 2001 – Human Services Award for Service to the HIV/AIDS by Community Office of the Mayor of City of New York
- 2002 – The Dr. Linda Laubenstein HIV Clinical Excellence Award by New York State Department of Health AIDS Institute
- 2003 – The President's Award for Outstanding Medical Leadership by Health and Hospitals Corporation City of New York
- 2006 – The Ruth Abramson Idealism in Medicine, Mount Sinai School of Medicine
- 2007 – The President's Volunteer Service Award Gold Level by U.S. Agency for International Development
- 2008 – Faculty Council Award for Academic Excellence, Mount Sinai School of Medicine
- 2010 – Fulbright Senior Specialists Roster
- 2012–2020 New York's Super Doctors
- 2013 – Service Award: HIV Clinical Guidelines Program by New York State Department of Health AIDS Institute
- 2015 – Top 15 Doctors in Queens – Queens Magazine
- 2017 – Queens Impact Award – TimesLedger Newspapers
- 2018 – The Jacobi Medallion – Icahn School of Medicine at Mount Sinai
