= Mandell L. and Madeleine H. Berman Foundation =

Philanthropist organization

The Mandell L. and Madeleine H. Berman Foundation was founded by Mandell L. Berman as a vehicle for his charitable giving. The foundation supports research and study of the American Jewish community.

== Notable Projects ==
- Berman Jewish Policy Archive @ NYU Wagner, a centralized electronic database of Jewish communal policy research.
- North American Jewish Data Bank, a centralized electronic database of Jewish demographic studies (see NJPS).

== See also ==
- Mandell Berman
- Philanthropy
- Foundation (charity)
