= Drew Gilpin Faust =

American historian and college administrator (born 1947)

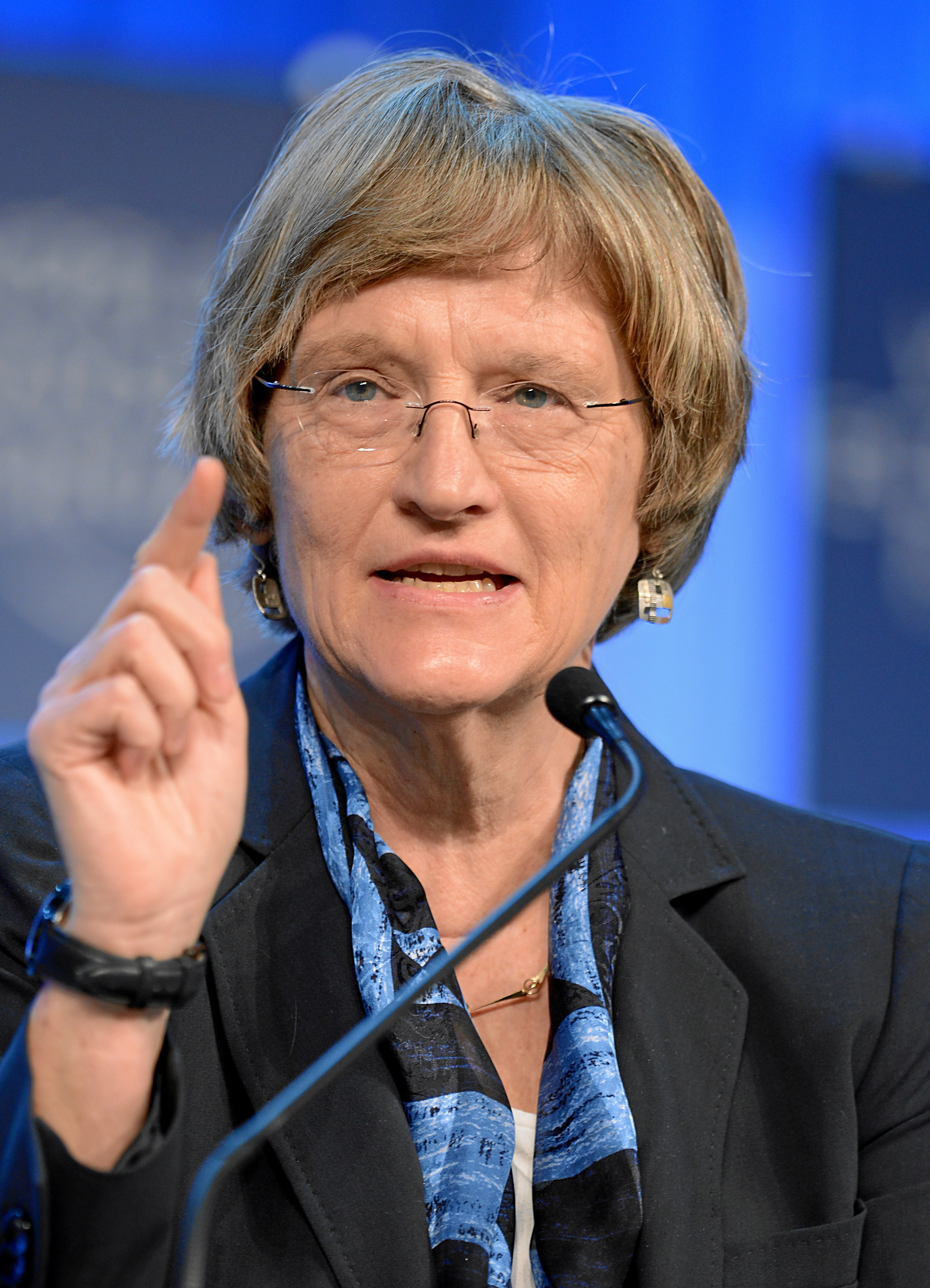
- Faust at the World Economic Forum in 2013

28th President of Harvard University
- In office July 1, 2007 – July 1, 2018
- Preceded by: Lawrence Summers; Derek Bok (acting)
- Succeeded by: Lawrence Bacow

Personal details
- Born: Catharine Drew Gilpin; September 18, 1947 (age 79) New York City, U.S.
- Spouse(s): Stephen E. Faust (m. 1968; div. 1976) Charles E. Rosenberg (m. 1980)
- Children: 2
- Education: Bryn Mawr College (BA); University of Pennsylvania (MA, PhD)

Academic background
- Thesis: A Sacred Circle: The Social Role of the Intellectual in the Old South, 1840–1860 (1975)
- Doctoral advisor: Charles E. Rosenberg

Academic work
- Discipline: History
- Sub-discipline: American South
- Institutions: University of Pennsylvania; Radcliffe Institute for Advanced Study; Harvard University

Catharine Drew Gilpin Faust (born September 18, 1947) is an American historian and author who served as the 28th president of Harvard University from 2007 to 2018. She was Harvard's first female president, its first president since 1672 without a Harvard undergraduate or graduate degree, and the first to have been raised in the South. Faust was also the founding dean of the Radcliffe Institute for Advanced Study. She was repeatedly named one of the world's 100 most powerful women by Forbes, reaching as high as 33rd in 2014.

== Early life and education ==
Drew Gilpin was born in New York City and raised in Clarke County, Virginia, in the Shenandoah Valley. She is the daughter of Catharine Ginna (née Mellick) and McGhee Tyson Gilpin. Her father was a Princeton graduate and bred thoroughbred horses, among other business ventures. Her paternal grandfather, Kenneth Newcomer Gilpin, was a businessman who served in the Virginia House of Delegates (representing Clarke and adjacent Warren Counties) and was an aviator in both World War I and World War II. Her paternal great-grandfather, General Lawrence Tyson, was a U.S. senator from Tennessee during the 1920s. Faust also has New England ancestry and is a descendant of Jonathan Edwards, the third president of Princeton.

Faust went to New England to attend Concord Academy in Concord, Massachusetts, from which she graduated in 1964. She then earned a B.A., magna cum laude, with honors in history from Bryn Mawr College in 1968. Three years later, she received an M.A. in American civilization from the University of Pennsylvania. She remained there to complete her Ph.D. in 1975, writing a thesis entitled A Sacred Circle: The Social Role of the Intellectual in the Old South, 1840–1860, published in 1977 as A Sacred Circle: The Dilemma of the Intellectual in the Old South, 1840–1860.

== Career ==
In 1975, Faust joined the University of Pennsylvania faculty as assistant professor of American civilization. Her area of specialty was the history of the South during the antebellum period and the Civil War. She rose to become Walter Annenberg Professor of History.

After publishing her thesis in book form as A Sacred Circle: Dilemma of the Intellectual in the Old South, 1840-1860 (1977), she authored a series of non-fiction books on U.S. history. Among them was James Henry Hammond and the Old South (1982), a biography of James Henry Hammond, Governor of South Carolina from 1842 to 1844. She followed that with Mothers of Invention: Women of the Slaveholding South in the American Civil War (1996), for which she won the Society of American Historians Francis Parkman Prize and the Avery O. Craven Award from the Organization of American Historians in 1997. Her book This Republic of Suffering (2008) was a critically acclaimed exploration of how Americans' understanding of death was shaped by the high casualties during the Civil War. It was a finalist for the Pulitzer Prize and National Book Award.

In 2001, Faust was appointed the first dean of the Radcliffe Institute for Advanced Study, which was established after the merger of Radcliffe College with Harvard University. On February 8, 2007, she was selected as the next president of Harvard. Following approval by the University's governing boards, her appointment was made official three days later. Faust was the first woman to serve as president of Harvard University. She succeeded Lawrence Summers, who had resigned on June 30, 2006, after a series of controversial statements that led to mounting criticism from members of Harvard Faculty of Arts and Sciences. Derek Bok, who served as Harvard president from 1971 to 1991, returned in the role of interim president during the 2006–2007 academic year.

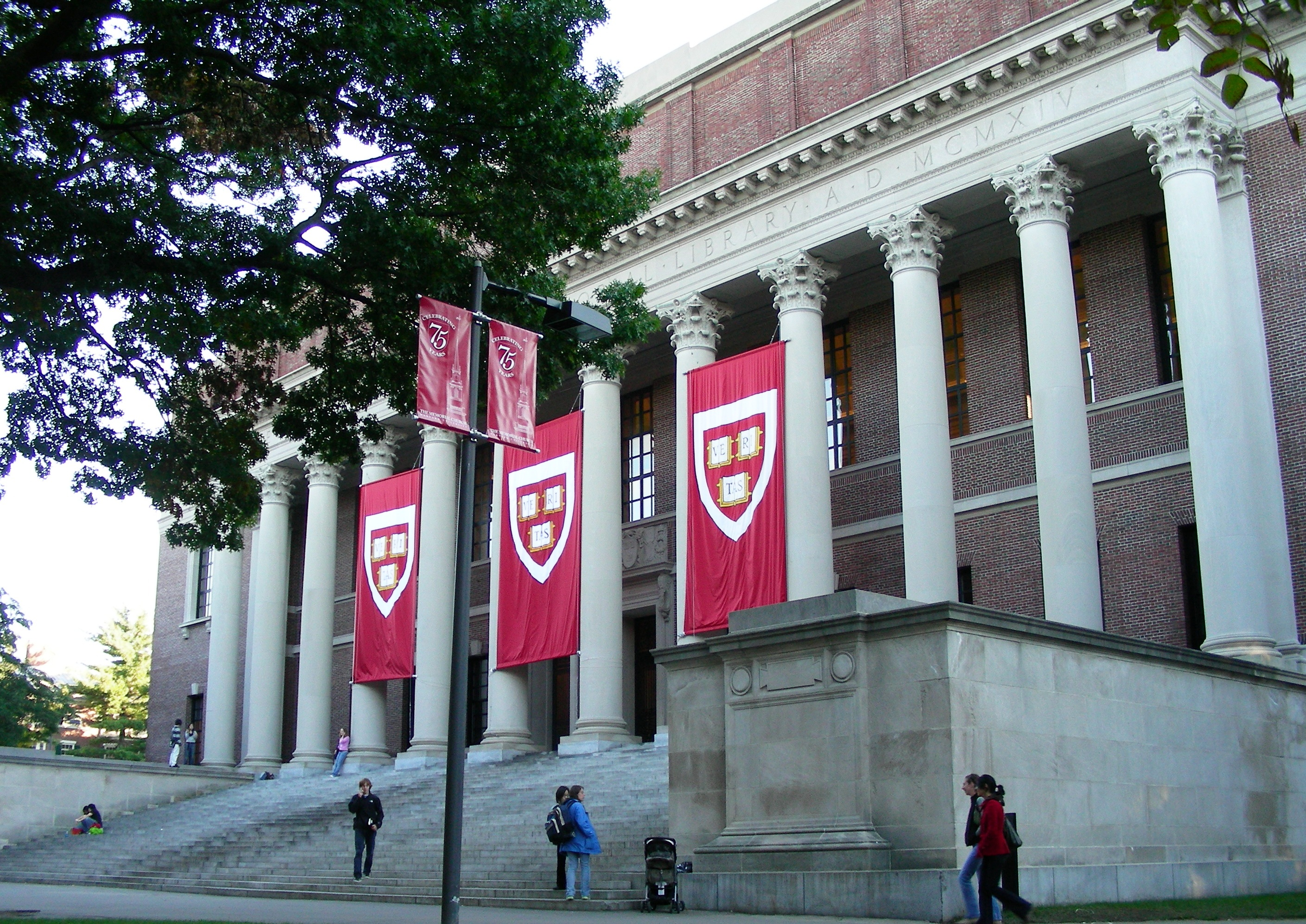
Preparations for the inauguration of Faust

At a campus press conference, Faust said, "I hope that my own appointment can be one symbol of an opening of opportunities that would have been inconceivable even a generation ago." She added, "I'm not the woman president of Harvard, I'm the president of Harvard." In her installation address on October 12, 2007, she said:

A university is not about results in the next quarter; it is not even about who a student has become by graduation. It is about learning that molds a lifetime, learning that transmits the heritage of millennia; learning that shapes the future.

In one of her first initiatives, Faust significantly increased financial aid offers to students at Harvard. On December 10, 2007, she announced a new policy for middle-class and upper-middle-class students, which limited parental contributions to 10 percent for families with annual earnings of $100,000–$180,000, and replaced loans with grants. In announcing the policy, she said, "Education is the engine that makes American democracy work.... And it has to work and that means people have to have access." The policy expanded on earlier programs that eliminated contributions for families earning less than $60,000 a year, and reduced costs for families earning less than $100,000. Similar policies were subsequently adopted at Stanford, Yale, and other private U.S. universities and colleges.

In addition to promoting access to higher education, Faust testified before Congress to request funding for scientific research and support of junior faculty researchers. She worked to further internationalize Harvard, and made it a priority at the school to revitalize the arts and integrate them into the daily life of students and staff. She was a strong advocate for sustainability and set an ambitious goal of cutting the University's greenhouse gas emissions by 2016, including those associated with prospective growth by 30 percent below Harvard's 2006 baseline. She championed organic lawn management of the campus grounds and Harvard Yard, and at Elmwood, the president's house on Brattle Street. These moves reduced the use of irrigation water by 30%, made Harvard Yard greener, and improved the health of the campus orchard.

In May 2008, Christina Romer, an economics professor at the University of California, Berkeley, was not offered tenure at Harvard despite support from members of the school's Economics Department. Harvard's confidential process by which tenure is decided includes a panel consisting of internal faculty members as well as experts from outside the department. Faust declined to discuss press reports related to Romer's tenure case. Romer was later appointed by President Barack Obama to chair the Council of Economic Advisers. During Faust's time as president, the Harvard Economics Department saw an exodus of prominent faculty to Stanford and MIT, including Raj Chetty, Susan Athey, Guido Imbens, Drew Fudenberg, and Nobel Laureate Al Roth.

When widescale layoffs were looming at Harvard in 2009, Faust was criticized for refusing to accept a pay cut that would have saved jobs. In the preceding months, various campus groups called upon her and other administrators to reduce their salaries as a means of easing the budget shortfall. Reports differed on Faust's salary at the time. The Boston Globe stated that Faust made $775,043 in the 2007–2008 school year, while The Harvard Crimson put her salary and benefits for the 2008–2009 fiscal year at $693,739. In the face of mounting pressure, the Harvard Corporation approved salary freezes for the president, deans, senior officers, management staff, and faculty, and offered an early retirement program. The layoffs and reduced hours began in June 2009 and affected about 2.4 percent of Harvard's non-faculty workforce.

In December 2010, Faust and Stanford University president John L. Hennessy co-wrote an editorial in support of passage of the DREAM Act. The legislation was not passed by the 111th U.S. Congress.

In 2011, Faust signed an agreement with Navy Secretary Ray Mabus, JD '76, to restore the Naval Reserve Officers Training Corps (NROTC) program at Harvard—after almost a 40-year absence—following the repeal of the "Don't Ask Don't Tell" law in December 2010.

In 2016, Harvard began to study its own historical involvement with slavery. This occurred after Faust publicly acknowledged that the school had been "directly complicit in America's system of racial bondage". She oversaw the installation on campus of a commemorative plaque to honor the enslaved whose labor was exploited by the institution. Her successor, Lawrence Bacow, subsequently commissioned a formal study in 2019, continuing Faust's work.

Faust retired as Harvard president in June 2018. Four days later, she joined the Board of Directors of Goldman Sachs. She retained her title as Professor of History at Harvard.

In 2023, Faust published a memoir, Necessary Trouble, about growing up in a conservative family in segregated Virginia. It describes her awakening to the Civil Rights movement that was occurring around her. For example, regarding the national news story in 1957 about the attempted integration of Little Rock Central High School in Little Rock, Arkansas, she writes: "I was 9 years old when the news reports about "massive resistance" and battles over segregation made me suddenly realize that it was not a matter of accident that my school was all-white."

== Personal life ==
Drew Gilpin's first marriage was to the surgeon Stephen E. Faust. After their divorce, she married Charles E. Rosenberg, a historian of medicine at Harvard. He had been Faust's dissertation advisor. They have a daughter, Jessica Rosenberg, who is a Harvard graduate and works for The New Yorker. Faust also has a stepdaughter, Leah Rosenberg. Faust's cousin, G.P. Mellick Belshaw, became the bishop of the Episcopal Diocese of New Jersey.

Faust was diagnosed with breast cancer in 1988 and treated that year. She made a full recovery and declined to speak with the media with more details about her diagnosis or treatment.

== Honors, affiliations and awards ==
- Faust was elected to the American Philosophical Society in 2007.
- Named a member of the "Time 100" (2007)
- Fellow of the American Academy of Arts & Sciences
- Awarded honorary doctorates from Bowdoin College (May 2007),The University of Pennsylvania (May 2008), Yale University (May 2008), and Princeton University (May 2010).
- Faust has been included in the Forbes list of "100 Most Powerful Women" multiple times. As of 2014, she was ranked at #33. She had risen from her 2013 position at #43.
- In 2011 the National Endowment for the Humanities selected Faust for the Jefferson Lecture, the U.S. federal government's highest honor for achievement in the humanities. Faust's lecture was titled "Telling War Stories: Reflections of a Civil War Historian".
- In October 2012, Faust delivered the Sesquicentennial Address at Boston College. It was titled "Scholarship and the Role of the University."
- In January 2015, Faust delivered the Rede Lecture at the University of Cambridge. It was titled "Two Wars and the Long Twentieth Century: the United States, 1861–65; Britain 1914–18"
- In 2018 Faust was the recipient of the John W. Kluge Prize given by the Library of Congress, to be presented on September 12, 2018.
- Faust was the recipient of the Newberry Library Award, presented by the Newberry Library in Chicago, Illinois, on April 19, 2024.

=== Awards for written works ===
- Received the 2009 Bancroft Prize from Columbia University for This Republic of Suffering (2008).
- Awarded the 2008 American History Book Prize for This Republic of Suffering.
- Her "Dread Void of Uncertainty" journal article was named one of ten best history essays of 2005 by the Organization of American Historians
- Received the 1997 Francis Parkman Prize of the Society of American Historians for Mothers of Invention.

== Selected works ==
External videos
- Booknotes interview with Faust on Mothers of Invention, September 1, 1996, C-SPAN
- Presentation by Faust on This Republic of Suffering, January 9, 2008, C-SPAN

- Necessary Trouble: Growing Up at Midcentury (Farrar, Straus and Giroux, 2023) ISBN 978-0374601812.
- This Republic of Suffering: Death and the American Civil War (Knopf, 2008) ISBN 978-0375404047. On the New York Times Book Review list of "The 10 Best Books of 2008" as chosen by the paper's editors. It was also a finalist for the National Book Award (2008) and Pulitzer Prize (2009).
- "'The Dread Void of Uncertainty': Naming the Dead in the American Civil War" (Southern Cultures, Summer 2005).
- Mothers of Invention: Women of the Slaveholding South in the American Civil War (University of North Carolina Press, 1996) ISBN 978-0807855737.
- Southern Stories: Slaveholders in Peace and War (University of Missouri Press, 1992) ISBN 978-0826209757.
- The Creation of Confederate Nationalism: Ideology and Identity in the Civil War South (Louisiana State University Press, 1982) ISBN 978-0807116067.
- James Henry Hammond and the Old South: A Design for Mastery (Louisiana State University Press, 1982) ISBN 978-0807112489.
- A Sacred Circle: The Dilemma of the Intellectual in the Old South, 1840–1860 Johns Hopkins University Press, 1977) ISBN 978-0801819674.

== Filmography ==
Film
Year	Title	Role	Director
2012	American Experience: Death and the Civil War	Herself	Ric Burns
2015	The Gettysburg Address	Herself	Sean Conant
