= Paul E. Gray =

American university president (1932–2017)

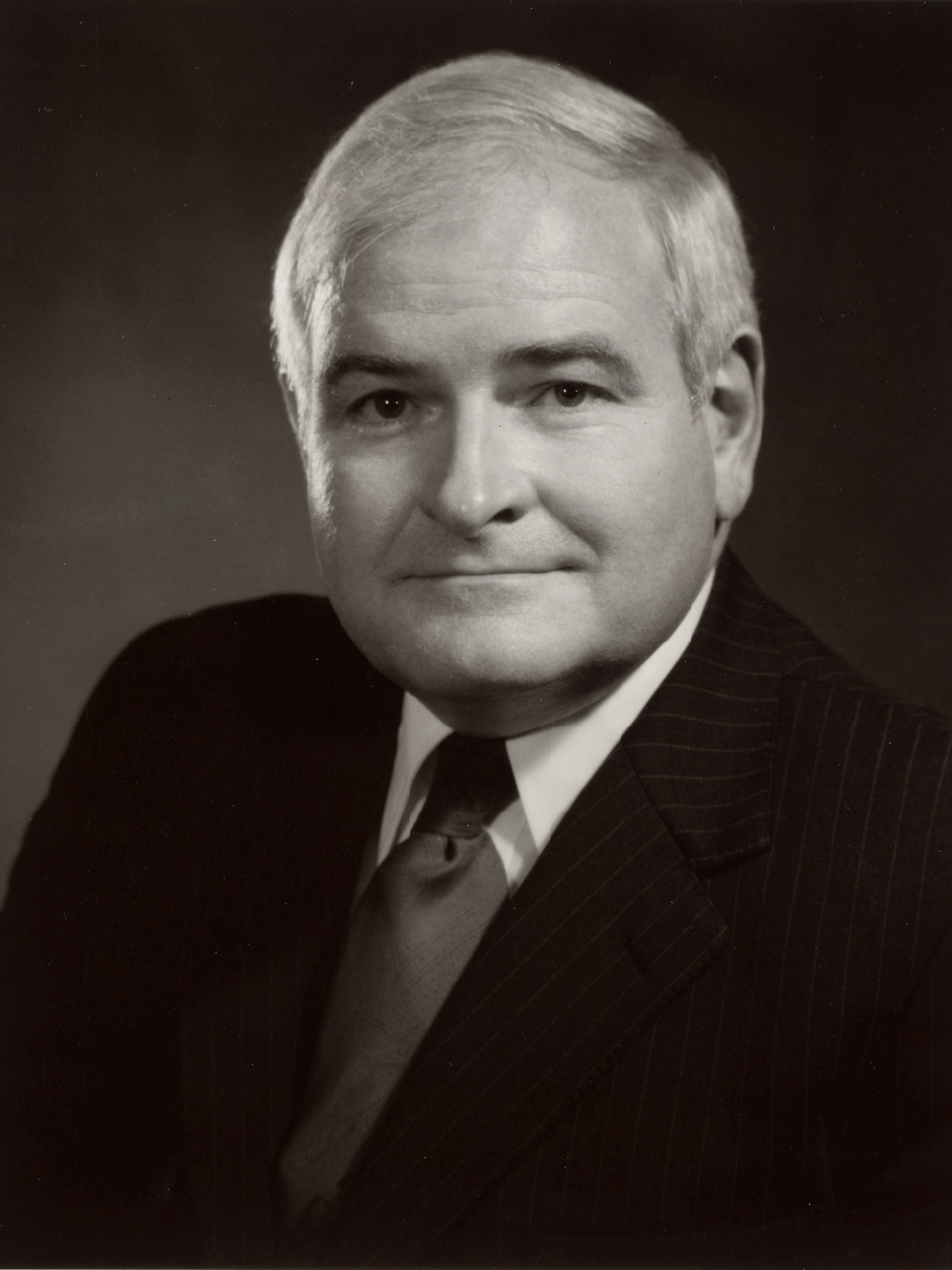

14th President of Massachusetts Institute of Technology
- In office July 1, 1980 – October 15, 1990
- Preceded by: Jerome Wiesner
- Succeeded by: Charles Vest

2nd Chancellor of Massachusetts Institute of Technology
- In office 1971–1980
- President: Jerome Wiesner
- Preceded by: Julius A. Stratton
- Succeeded by: Lawrence S. Bacow

Personal details
- Born: Paul Edward Gray; February 7, 1932 Newark, New Jersey, U.S.
- Died: September 18, 2017 (aged 85) Concord, Massachusetts, U.S.
- Education: Massachusetts Institute of Technology (BS, MS, DSc)
- Profession: Electrical engineering
- Awards: IEEE Fellow (1972); IEEE Founders Medal (2010)
- Scientific career
- Fields: Electrical engineering
- Institutions: Massachusetts Institute of Technology
- Thesis: The dynamic behavior of thermoelectric devices (1960)

Paul Edward Gray (February 7, 1932 – September 18, 2017) was the 14th president of the Massachusetts Institute of Technology. He is known for his accomplishments in promoting engineering education, practice, and leadership at MIT and in the world at large.

== Early life and education ==
Born in Newark, New Jersey, in 1932, Gray graduated from MIT in 1954 with a SB in electrical engineering, and was a member of the Phi Sigma Kappa fraternity. He subsequently obtained an SM and ScD from MIT in 1955 and 1960, both in electrical engineering, and served as an electronics instructor in the US Army from 1955 to 1957.

== Massachusetts Institute of Technology ==
As an MIT professor, Gray specialized in researching and teaching semiconductor electronics and circuit theory. In 1969, he co-authored Electronic principles: Physics, models, and circuits, which became a standard textbook on fundamental principles of solid-state electronics technology.

Gray rapidly rose through the MIT administration, serving as associate dean for student affairs (1965–1967), associate provost (1969–1970), and then dean of the School of Engineering (1970–1971). Under MIT president Jerome Wiesner, Gray served as chancellor (1971–1980). From 1980 to 1990, he served as president of MIT, and then as chairman of the MIT Corporation (1990–1997).

At MIT, Gray is credited with helping to establish the Undergraduate Research Opportunities Program (UROP), the Leaders for Manufacturing program, and the ongoing affiliation with the Whitehead Institute for Biomedical Research. He led the Task Force on Educational Opportunity (1968–1973), and encouraged undergraduate curriculum reforms in the 1980s that strengthened the humanities, social sciences, and biology. He broadened MIT's traditional engineering programs to also encourage development of management skills.

In 1982, Gray became an inaugural member of Ronald Reagan's White House Science Council, where he served for four years. He was a member of the Council's Panel on the Health of Universities, and was also vice chairman of the Council on Competitiveness.

After retiring from chairmanship of MIT, Gray returned to teaching and advising undergraduate students. He was a professor of electrical engineering and president emeritus of MIT, and a life fellow of the IEEE.

Gray died on September 18, 2017, in Concord, Massachusetts, from complications of Alzheimer's disease.

== Bibliography ==
- Gray, Paul E. (1960). The Dynamic Behavior of Thermoelectric Devices. Massachusetts Institute of Technology. ASIN B01IL7SQDQ.
- Gray, Paul E. (1967). Introduction to Electronics. John Wiley & Sons. ISBN 978-0471323204.
- Gray, Paul E.; Searle, Campbell L. (1970). Electronic Principles: Physics, Models and Circuits. John Wiley & Sons. ISBN 978-0471324003.

Academic offices
Vacant Title last held by Julius A. Stratton	2nd Chancellor of the Massachusetts Institute of Technology; 1971 – 1980	Vacant Title next held by Lawrence S. Bacow
Preceded by Jerome Wiesner	14th President of the Massachusetts Institute of Technology; 1980 – 1990	Succeeded by Charles Vest
