= Tanveer Syeda-Mahmood =

Indian-American computer scientist

- Education: Osmania University Indian Institute of Technology (IIT) Madras Massachusetts Institute of Technology
- Scientific career
- Thesis: (1993)
- Doctoral advisor: Eric Grimson

Tanveer Fathima Syeda-Mahmood is an Indian-American computer scientist whose research topics include image retrieval, multimedia databases, and medical image analysis. She is a chief scientist for the IBM Research Almaden Laboratory in San Jose, California, where she has led groups developing cognitive assistants for radiologists and cardiologists, assistive technology for people with memory impairments, and biologically inspired storage media.

== Education and career ==
Syeda-Mahmood was home-schooled, and then skipped two grades after entering primary school in India. She earned a bachelor's degree in electronics and communication from Osmania University, and a master's degree in computer science from Indian Institute of Technology (IIT) Madras. She went to the Massachusetts Institute of Technology (MIT) for doctoral study, funded by an IBM graduate fellowship; her early projects there included a 1988 prototype robotic vacuum cleaner. After completing her Ph.D. at MIT in 1993, under the supervision of Eric Grimson, she worked for Xerox at their Webster Research Center, on content-based image retrieval, before moving to IBM in 1998.

Some recent articles by Syeda-Mahmood include topics such as medical image analysis and comparison of reading chest X-rays by radiology residents and an AI.

== Recognition ==
Syeda-Mahmood was named as an Institute of Electronical and Electronics Engineers (IEEE) Fellow, in the 2011 class of fellows, "for contributions to content-based image and video indexing and retrieval". She is an IBM Fellow, elected in 2016, and a member of the IBM Academy of Technology. In 2020 she was inducted into the American Institute for Medical and Biological Engineering College of Fellows, "for outstanding technical achievement and leadership in multimodal imaging decision support with lasting impact to academia/industry in healthcare AI".
