= Daniel L. Schwartz =

American academic and university administrator

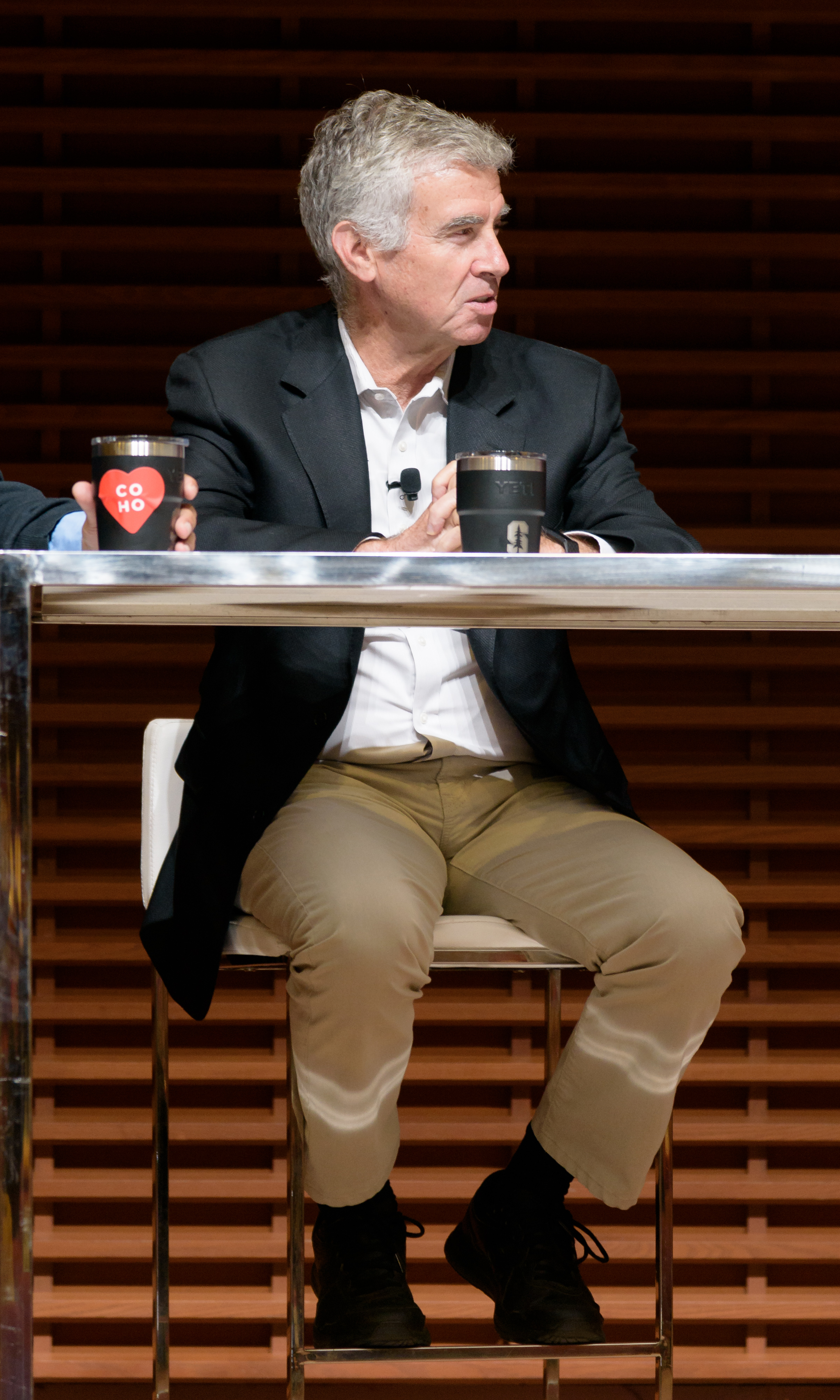

Dean of the Stanford University Graduate School of Education
- In office September 1, 2015 – October 31, 2026

Personal details
- Education: Swarthmore College (BA) Columbia University (PhD)

Daniel L. Schwartz is an American academic and university administrator. He served as the I. James Quillen Dean of the Stanford University Graduate School of Education from 2015 to 2026. He is the Nomellini & Olivier Professor of Educational Technology and the Halper Family Faculty Director of the Stanford Accelerator for Learning.

== Biography ==
Schwartz received his undergraduate degree from Swarthmore College and Ph.D. from Columbia University. He taught in rural Kenya, Los Angeles, and Kaltag, Alaska, before becoming an assistant professor of psychology at Vanderbilt University. He became an associate professor at Stanford University in 2000 and was named dean of Stanford's Graduate School of Education in 2015.

Schwartz' research focuses on the intersections of neuroscience and education, learning differences, and early childhood learning and has sought to create improved learning environments using modern technology.

Schwartz is the author of The ABCs Of How We Learn (2016), which provides an overview of 26 approaches that can help students improve their learning skills.
