= Nils Yngve Wessell =

American psychologist (1914–2007)

8th President of Tufts University
- In office 1953–1966
- Preceded by: Leonard Carmichael
- Succeeded by: Leonard Chapin Mead

Personal details
- Born: April 14, 1914 Warren, Pennsylvania
- Died: March 4, 2007 (aged 92) Naples, Florida

Nils Yngve Wessell (April 14, 1914 – March 4, 2007) was an American psychologist and the eighth president of Tufts University from 1953 to 1966, overseeing its transformation from a small liberal arts college to an internationally known research university.

== Early life and education ==
Wessell was born in Warren, Pennsylvania to Swedish immigrants Nils Johan Wessell, a Congregationalist minister, and Esther Walquist Wessell, a nurse.

He obtained his B.S. in psychology from Lafayette College in 1934, his master's in psychology from Brown University in 1935, and his Ph.D. in psychology from the University of Rochester in 1938. (He was later awarded honorary degrees from Lafayette College, Lesley College, Boston University, Boston College, Northeastern University, Brown University, and Brandeis University.)

He married Marian Sigler about 1938 and had two children.

== Career at Tufts ==
Brought to Tufts in 1939 by his mentor, Tufts president Leonard Carmichael, Wessell taught psychology (1939–1947) and was dean of liberal arts (1939–1953) and vice president (1951–1953). Upon becoming president of the college on December 9, 1953, he called for Tufts to become a university, leading the Massachusetts Board of Corporations to change the name from Tufts College to Tufts University. In addition to the name change, Wessell committed to developing graduate programs in the colleges of arts, sciences and engineering in order to become a true research university.

Biology and chemistry laboratories, an engineering building, new dormitories, and the Wessell Library were built during his presidency, and the Experimental College and Lincoln Filene Center for Public Service were opened.

He resigned in 1966 due to his belief in "change in the office of president in a university every 10 or 15 years."

== Later life ==
Wessell served as a member of the board of the trustees of his alma mater, Lafayette College, from 1958 to 1964. He was also the president of the Institute for Educational Development from 1965 to 1968 and president of the Alfred P. Sloan Foundation from 1968 to 1979. In 1976, he was chairman of a New York commission that studied the possibility of merging the City University of New York system with the State University of New York system, ultimately advising against it. In 1979 Wessell was named "Swedish American of the year".

He died at his home in Naples, Florida on March 4, 2007.

== Sources ==
- Hevesi, Dennis (2007-03-09). "Nils Wessell, 92, Leader Who Transformed Tufts, Is Dead". New York Times.
- "Tufts Remembers Former President Nils Wessell". Tufts E-News. 2007-03-14. Archived from the original on 30 December 2007.
- Sauer, Anne (ed.). "Wessell, Nils Yngve". Concise Encyclopedia of Tufts History.
