= John A. DiBiaggio =

American academic administrator (1932–2020)

- DiBiaggio in 1995

11th President of Tufts University
- In office 1992–2001
- Preceded by: Jean Mayer
- Succeeded by: Lawrence S. Bacow

17th President of Michigan State University
- In office 1985–1992
- Preceded by: M. Cecil Mackey
- Succeeded by: Gordon Guyer

10th President of the University of Connecticut
- In office 1979–1985
- Preceded by: Glenn W. Ferguson
- Succeeded by: John T. Casteen III

Personal details
- Born: September 11, 1932 San Antonio, Texas, US
- Died: February 1, 2020 (aged 87) Centennial, Colorado, US
- Education: Eastern Michigan University (B.A.); University of Detroit (D.D.S.); University of Michigan (M.A.)
- Profession: Academic administrator

John Angelo DiBiaggio (September 11, 1932 – February 1, 2020) was an American dentist and academic who served as president of the University of Connecticut from 1979 to 1985, president of Michigan State University from 1985 to 1992, and president of Tufts University from 1992 to 2001. He was a "people person" known for his fundraising skills and fostering collaboration, interdisciplinary research and learning, and civic engagement.

== Early life ==
DiBiaggio was born in San Antonio, Texas, and raised in Detroit. He was the son of Italian immigrants and the first in his family to attend college.

== Education ==
DiBiaggio earned his bachelor's degree from Eastern Michigan University in 1954 and his doctorate from the University of Detroit School of Dentistry in 1958, where he served as a clinical instructor and assistant to the dean. In 1967, he earned a master's degree in higher education administration from the Horace H. Rackham School of Graduate Studies at the University of Michigan. He was a member of Pi Kappa Alpha.

== Career ==
DiBiaggio practiced general dentistry in New Baltimore, Michigan from 1958 to 1965. He served as assistant dean for student affairs at the University of Kentucky from 1967 to 1970 and as dean of the school of dentistry at Virginia Commonwealth University from 1970 to 1976.

=== President of the University of Connecticut ===
DiBiaggio first came to UConn in 1976, serving as vice president for Health Affairs and executive director of the UConn Health Center for three years. He was named the tenth President of the university in 1979. As president, he strengthened the university's financial footing by establishing the Tuition Plan, which enabled UConn to retain tuition revenue, and mounted UConn's first capital campaign, which raised more than double its goal of $25 million. Enrollment increased only modestly during his tenure, and efforts to attract more minority students largely failed, but the institution's budget rose from $130 million to $200 million thanks to increased state support and out-of-state tuition. DiBiaggio adopted an academic master plan known as "Opportunities for the Eighties." In 1984, the UConn School of Law moved to a new location at the site of the former Hartford Seminary. One month later, the Avery Point campus in Groton was designated the undersea research center for the Northeast and Great Lakes region. DiBaggio was popular with students. The 1985 Nutmeg yearbook remarked that the president "brought a sunny warmth and openness to these rock hills."

=== President of Michigan State University ===
DiBiaggio resigned from UConn in 1985 to become the seventeenth president of Michigan State University, serving seven years until 1992. In 1987, he launched Michigan State's first major capital campaign, raising more than $217 million, including a $20 million naming gift for the Eli Broad College of Business. In 1989, he inaugurated the university's K1200 Superconducting Cyclotron, then the world's highest-energy continuous beam accelerator and a precursor to the Facility for Rare Isotope Beams. He oversaw construction of the Jack Breslin Student Events Center, which opened in 1989. His tenure saw the MSU Spartans football team win the Rose Bowl in 1988. After a two-year battle, he persuaded trustees to oust head football coach George Perles as MSU athletics director in fall 1991. DiBiaggio also implemented a new core curriculum based on integrative learning.

=== President of Tufts University ===
John DiBiaggio celebrating Spring Fling at Tufts University in 1993

DiBiaggio became the eleventh president of Tufts University in April 1993. During his nine-year tenure, he launched a fundraising campaign that tripled the university's endowment to nearly $600 million. In 2000, he founded the Jonathan M. Tisch College of Civic Life, originally named the University College of Citizenship and Public Life. His tenure saw the construction of the Jaharis Family Center for Biomedical Nutrition Research in Boston, the Bernice Barbour Wildlife Medicine Building in Grafton, and the Tisch Library, Dowling Hall, and the Gantcher Family Sports and Convocation Center in Medford. In the early 1990s, he worked with US Senator Ted Kennedy to convene the Massachusetts Campus Compact of sixty colleges and universities.

Following his retirement from Tufts in 2001, DiBiaggio served two terms as a trustee of the University of Massachusetts, appointed at the recommendation of US Senator John Kerry. He also worked as a consultant for college presidents and executive directors nationwide.

In 2004, DiBiaggio was hired by the University of Colorado to investigate ethical breaches and reform the athletics department.

=== Public service ===
During his career, DiBiaggio served on the boards of the American Council on Education, American Film Institute, Campus Compact, Golden Key National Honor Society, Knight Commission, and the NCAA Foundation. He was a member of the Council for International Exchange of Scholars and served as president of the board of the American Cancer Society Foundation.

== Personal life ==
In 1989, DiBiaggio married Nancy Cronemiller, a sales director for luxury apparel. He had three children from a previous marriage: Dana, David, and Deirdre.

DiBiaggio died in Centennial, Colorado, on February 1, 2020. He was 87 years old.
