= Burton Crosby Hallowell =

9th President of Tufts University
- In office 1967–1976
- Preceded by: Leonard Chapin Mead
- Succeeded by: Jean Mayer

Personal details
- Born: May 2, 1915; Orleans, Massachusetts
- Died: November 21, 2006 (aged 91); Orleans, Massachusetts

Burton Crosby Hallowell (May 2, 1915 – November 21, 2006) was the ninth president of Tufts University.

== Early life and education ==
Born in Orleans, Massachusetts, he received bachelor's and master's degrees from Wesleyan University, and his Ph.D. from Princeton University in 1949. After working as an instructor of economics at Wesleyan from 1941 to 1942, Hallowell worked for the Office of Strategic Services in 1942 and the United States Army from 1942 to 1946. He then returned to Wesleyan, where he served as a professor of economics from 1946 until 1967, helping establish "the best small department of economics in the country" (as appraised, at the time, by an external evaluation). He also served as Wesleyan's Vice President for Planning and Development from 1962 to 1965 and as Executive Vice President from 1965 to 1967.

== Career at Tufts ==
In 1967, Hallowell was inaugurated as the ninth president of Tufts University. He is credited with successfully applying his financial planning skills to Tufts' budget. Committees such as the University Steering Committee, the Committee on Undergraduate Education, and the President's Administrative Advisory Group were very active during his tenure. Hallowell was a proponent of self-designed study for students; he supported both the Experimental College and the College Within program. He resigned as president in 1976, in accordance with his belief that such a position should be held for no longer than a decade.

Hallowell Hall on the Tufts University campus is named for him.

== Sources ==
- "Tufts Mourns Loss Of Burton Crosby Hallowell". Tufts E-News. 2006-11-27. Archived from the original on 2006-12-12.
- "Concise Encyclopedia of Tufts History". Tufts Digital Library. Archived from the original on 2010-06-09.
