= Charles E. Rosenberg =

American historian of medicine (born 1936)

- Born: Charles Ernest Rosenberg; November 11, 1936 (age 89); New York City, New York, U.S.
- Spouse: Drew Gilpin Faust (m. 1980)

Academic background
- Education: University of Wisconsin–Madison; Columbia University
- Doctoral advisor: Richard Hofstadter

Academic work
- Discipline: History
- Sub-discipline: History of science
- Institutions: University of Pennsylvania; Harvard University

Charles Ernest Rosenberg (born 1936) is an American historian of medicine. He is Professor of the History of Science and Medicine and the Ernest E. Monrad Professor in the Social Sciences at Harvard University.

== Early life and education ==
Rosenberg was born in New York City on November 11, 1936, and graduated with a Bachelor of Arts from the University of Wisconsin–Madison in 1956. He received both his master's degree (1957) and PhD (1961) from Columbia University.

== Career ==
Rosenberg taught at the University of Pennsylvania from 1963 until 2001. In 2001, he moved to Harvard University. He served as acting chairman of Harvard's history of science department in 2003–2004.

== Personal life ==
Rosenberg is married to Drew Gilpin Faust, the former president of Harvard University.

== Honors ==
In 2002, Rosenberg was elected to the American Philosophical Society.

== Selected bibliography ==
- Rosenberg, Charles E. (1962). The Cholera Years: The United States in 1832, 1849 and 1866. The University of Chicago Press.
- Rosenberg, Charles E. (1968). The Trial of the Assassin Guiteau: Psychiatry and Law in the Gilded Age. The University of Chicago Press.
- Rosenberg, Charles E. (1987). The Care of Strangers: The Rise of America's Hospital System. Basic Books.
- Rosenberg, Charles E. (1992). Explaining Epidemics. Cambridge University Press.
- Rosenberg, Charles E. (1997). No Other Gods. On Science and American Social Thought. The Johns Hopkins University Press.
- Rosenberg, Charles E. (2007). Our Present Complaint: American Medicine, Then and Now. The Johns Hopkins University Press.
