= Stanford University Graduate School of Education =

Private graduate school in Stanford, California, US

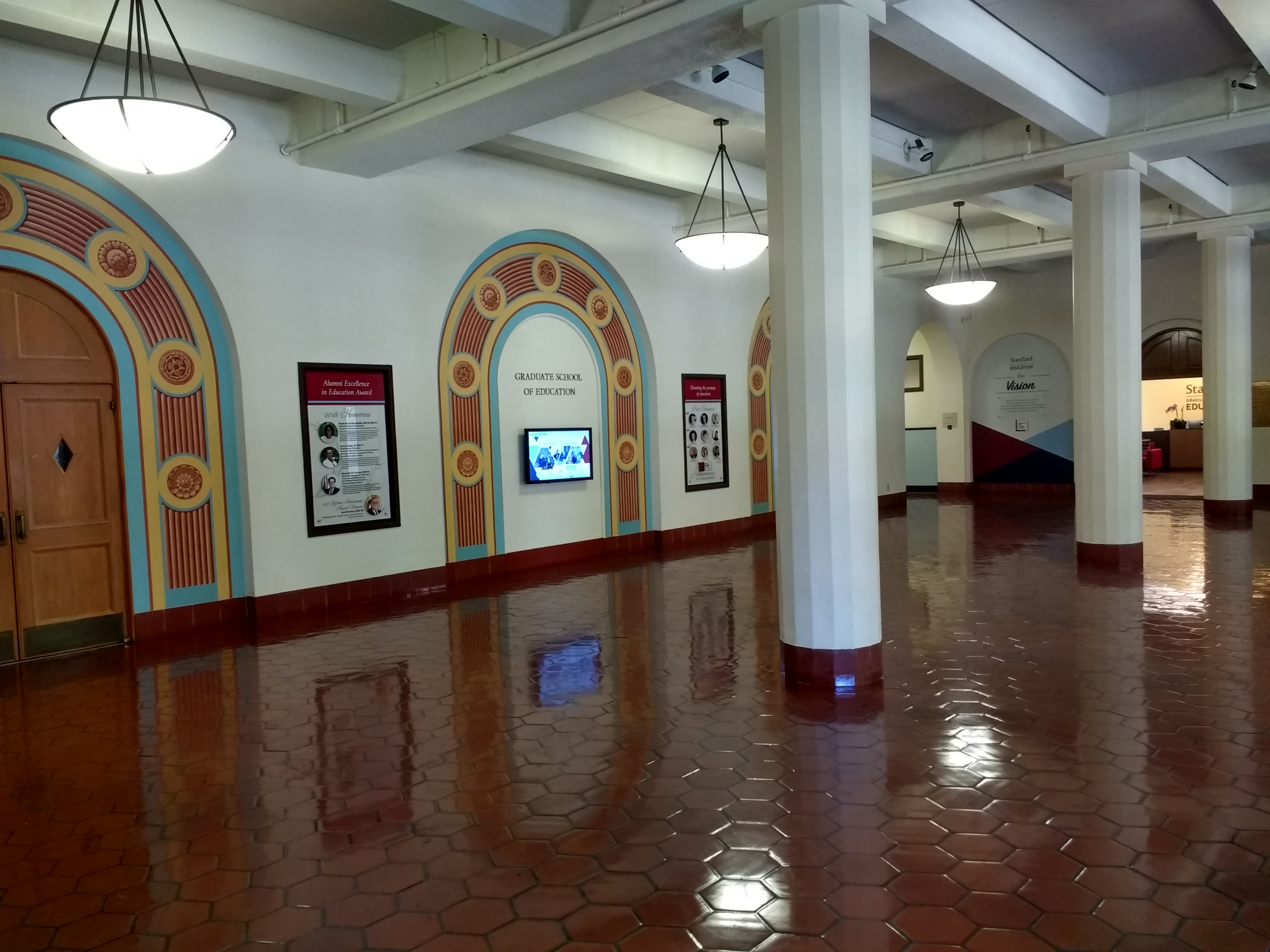
School of Education building

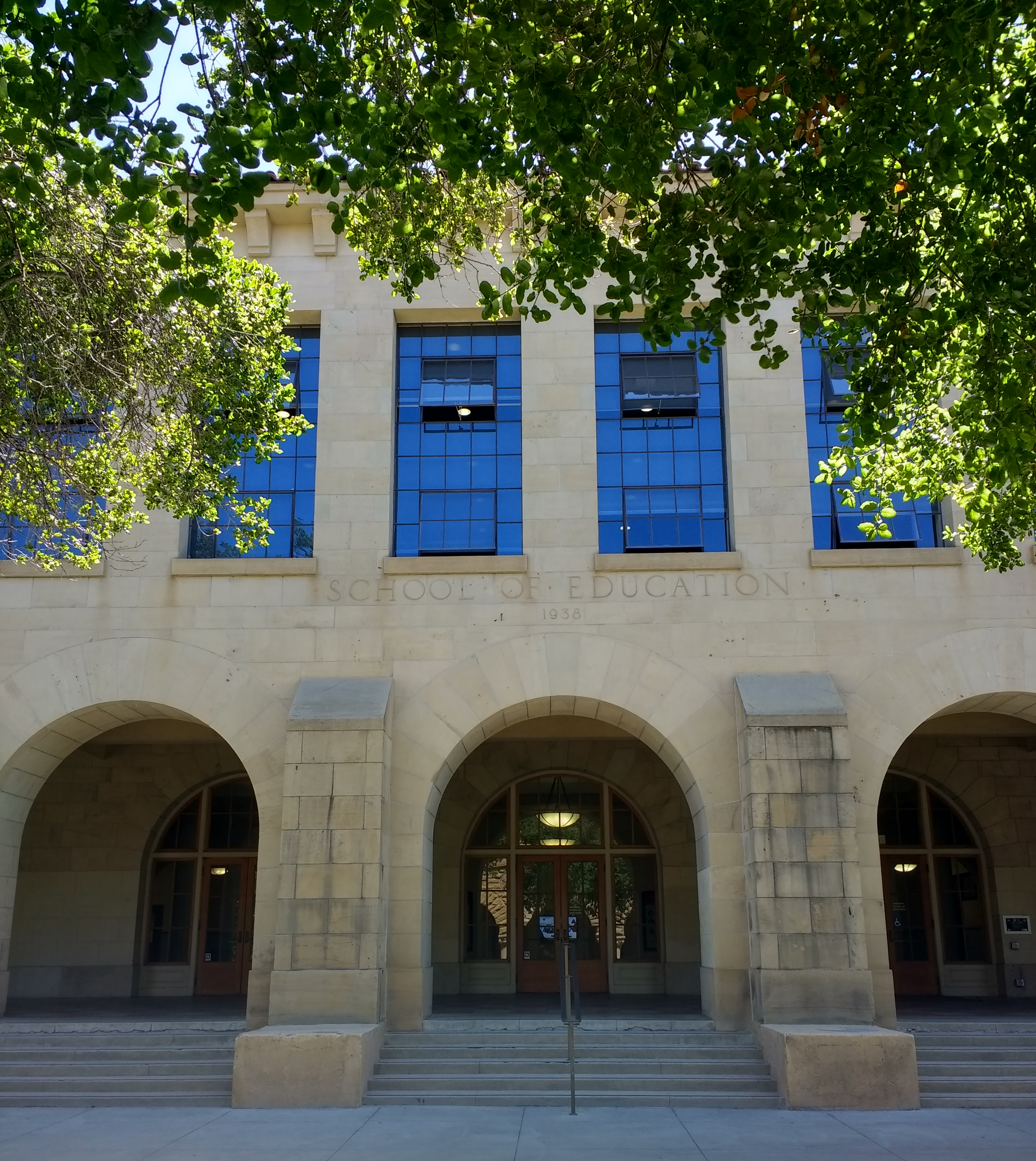
School of Education building

The Stanford University Graduate School of Education (Stanford GSE or GSE) is one of the top education schools in the United States. It offers master's and doctoral programs in more than 25 areas of specialization, along with joint degrees with other programs at Stanford University including business, law, and public policy. The current dean of Stanford GSE is Tomiko Brown-Nagin, who became the I. James Quillen Dean on November 1, 2026. She succeeded Daniel L. Schwartz, who served as dean from 2015 and announced in February 2026 that he would step down.

== History ==
The Department of the History and Art of Education was one of the original twenty-one departments at Stanford University. Ellwood Patterson Cubberley was the department chair from 1898 to 1917. One of his first hires was Lewis Terman, who modified a French intelligence test to create the Stanford-Binet intelligence scale. Released in 1916, it became the standard intelligence test in the United States and brought worldwide fame to Terman and to Stanford.

The department awarded its first Ph.D. in 1916, and in 1917 it was renamed the Stanford University School of Education (SUSE). Cubberley became the first dean of the School of Education and served in that position until 1933. The Graduate School of Education building, funded in large part by a donation from Cubberley, and Cubberley Library were both built in 1938.

In 2013 the school's name was changed to the Stanford Graduate School of Education to better reflect its advanced research and its graduate-level preparation of educators, scholars, policy makers and entrepreneurs.

== Programs for teachers ==
The Stanford Teacher Education Program (STEP), to train teachers, was established in 1959. The STEP program offers two tracks, elementary or secondary. Both are one-year programs including both academic course work and teaching in actual classrooms, and both lead to a Stanford MA degree and a California teaching credential.

The school also offers numerous professional development programs and resources for practicing elementary and secondary school teachers. These include the Center for the Support of Excellence in Teaching, the National Board Resource Center, the Problem-Solving Cycle, and Stanford English Learner Education Services.

== Berman Jewish Policy Archive ==
The Berman Archive (previously the Berman Jewish Policy Archive), housed at the School of Education, is a centralized electronic database of Jewish communal policy research. Its collection contains more than 20,000 documents, with holdings spanning from 1900 until today. It also is connected to the Jewish Survey Question Bank, a freely available repository of survey tools and questionnaires. The BJPA partners with the North American Jewish Data Bank; together they source the largest publicly available collection of Jewish policy research. The BJPA was established through the Mandell L. and Madeleine H. Berman Foundation, the Charles H. Revson Foundation, and continued with support from the Jim Joseph Foundation.

The director and founder is Steven M. Cohen.

The associate director is Ari Y. Kelman

== Ranking ==
Ever since U.S. News & World Report began ranking schools of education, Stanford has ranked among the top ten overall in the United States and has received the top peer assessment score of any school each year.

== Leadership ==
=== Chairs of the department ===
- Earl Barnes, 1891–1897
- Ellwood Patterson Cubberley, 1898–1917

=== Deans of the school ===
- Ellwood Patterson Cubberley, 1917–1933
- Grayson Kefauver, 1933–1946 (on leave 1943–1946)
- Lucien Blair Kinney (acting), 1943–1946
- A. John Bartky, 1946–1953
- I. James Quillen, 1953–1966
- H. Thomas James, 1966–1970
- Arthur Coladarci, 1970–1979
- Myron Atkin, 1979–1986
- Marshall S. Smith, 1986–1993
- Nel Noddings (acting), 1993–1994
- Richard Shavelson, 1994–2001
- Deborah Stipek, 2001–2011
- Claude Steele, 2011–2014
- Deborah Stipek, 2014–2015
- Daniel L. Schwartz, 2015–2026
- Tomiko Brown-Nagin, 2026–present
