= Leonard Chapin Mead =

American academic administrator (1913–2002)

President of Tufts University
- In office 1966–1967
- Preceded by: Nils Yngve Wessell
- Succeeded by: Burton Crosby Hallowell

Personal details
- Born: December 28, 1913; Milford, Massachusetts
- Died: October 11, 2002 (aged 88)

Leonard Chapin Mead (December 28, 1913 – October 11, 2002) was the acting president of Tufts University from 1966 to 1967, between the terms of the eighth and ninth elected presidents.

== Early life and education ==
Mead was born in Milford, Massachusetts. He received a bachelor of arts degree from Dartmouth College in 1936, as well as a master's degree in 1937 and a Ph.D. in 1939 from the University of Rochester.

== Career at Tufts ==
Mead held a variety of teaching positions in the Psychology Department at Tufts from 1939 until his retirement in 1976.

Mead also served as the dean of the Graduate School of Arts and Sciences from 1953 to 1959, and then as the senior vice president and provost from 1959 to 1966. He served as acting president from 1966 through 1967, when he was awarded an honorary degree from Tufts. In 1968, he took a leave of absence to serve as the project specialist for the Ford Foundation at the University of Delhi in India. He returned to Tufts and retired in 1979.

== Sources ==
- "Leonard C. Mead becomes acting president, 1966". Tufts Interactive Timeline. Archived from the original on 2009-02-18.
- "Concise Encyclopedia of Tufts History: "Mead, Leonard Chapin, 1913-"". Tufts Digital Library. Archived from the original on 2010-06-10.
