= AIDS Research and Therapy =

- Subject: HIV/AIDS
- Language: English
- Edited by: Eric Arts, Mark Boyd

Publication details
- History: 2004–present
- Publisher: BioMed Central
- Frequency: Upon acceptance
- Open access: Yes
- Impact factor: 2.357 (2017)

Standard abbreviations
- ISO 4: AIDS Res. Ther.

Indexing
- CODEN: 2005243094
- ISSN: 1742-6405
- OCLC no.: 992896344

Links
- Journal homepage; Online archive

AIDS Research and Therapy is a peer-reviewed open access medical journal covering research on HIV/AIDS. It was established in 2004 and is published by BioMed Central. The editors-in-chief are Eric Arts (University of Western Ontario) and Mark Boyd (Kirby Institute). According to the Journal Citation Reports, the journal has a 2017 impact factor of 2.357.
