= JESNA =

JESNA (Jewish Education Service of North America) was the Jewish federation system's educational coordinating, planning, and development agency. A national, non-profit agency, it was created in 1981 as the follow-on agency of the American Association of Jewish Education (AAJE) which existed from 1939 until 1981.

A study in 1978 by the AAJE and Council of Jewish Federations to determine the future directions of the AAJE determined that while there was a continued need for a national Jewish educations service system, they recommended a restructuring which would better serve the evolving needs of the 21st century. This restructuring became JESNA.

Some of the AAJE departments continued at JESNA in revised formats, among them the Department of Research and Educational Information, formerly the Department of Community Services and Studies, run by Dr. George Pollak.

JESNA ceased operations in 2013.

== Role ==
From 1981 until 2013, the agency provided service and created partnerships with a wide array of organizations and individuals, including Federations, religious movements, national agencies, foundations, and many educational institutions.

JESNA's goal was to increase the availability of engaging, inspiring, high quality Jewish education. Operating as a national resource, a community partner, a catalyst and a consultant, an innovator and a guarantor of quality, JESNA helped to: recruit and prepare new generations of talented, committed Jewish educators; create and identify models of excellence in educational practice; and assist communities and front-line institutions in improving their programs and performance.

JESNA worked closely with the central agencies for Jewish education that operate in more than 60 communities and the Jewish federations in more than 150 communities throughout North America.

Its justification for closing after thirty two years of operation was that with the major dramatic changes taking place on the Jewish education scene in the United States there were many new organizations and collaborations taking place.

== Structure ==
It was governed by a board of directors composed of lay and professional leaders in Jewish education from across North America, including individuals from the major Jewish religious movements.
