= Charles M. Vest =

American engineer, educator, and university president (1941–2013)

Charles Marstiller Vest
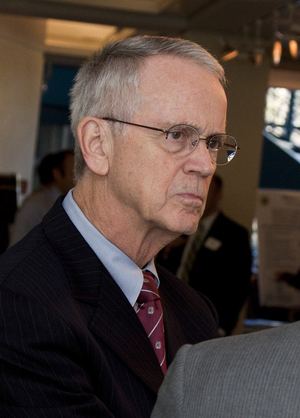

15th President of the Massachusetts Institute of Technology
- In office 1990–2004
- Preceded by: Paul Gray
- Succeeded by: Susan Hockfield

7th Vice President for Academic Affairs and Provost of the University of Michigan
- In office 1989–1990
- Preceded by: James Duderstadt
- Succeeded by: Gilbert R. Whitaker, Jr.

Personal details
- Born: September 9, 1941 Morgantown, West Virginia
- Died: December 12, 2013 (aged 72) Arlington, Virginia
- Children: Kemper Vest Gay, John Vest
- Education: West Virginia University (BS); University of Michigan (MSE, PhD)
- Scientific career
- Fields: Mechanical engineering
- Institutions: University of Michigan; Massachusetts Institute of Technology
- Thesis: Stability of natural convection in a vertical slot (1967)

Charles Marstiller "Chuck" Vest (September 9, 1941 – December 12, 2013) was an American mechanical engineer and academic administrator. He served as president of the National Academy of Engineering from 2007 to 2013, as the 15th president of the Massachusetts Institute of Technology from 1990 to 2004, as the 7th provost of the University of Michigan from 1989 to 1990, and as the 11th dean of the University of Michigan College of Engineering from 1986 to 1989.

== Education and career ==
Vest was born in Morgantown, West Virginia, in 1941. He went to Morgantown High School.

Vest received a Bachelor of Science with a major in mechanical engineering from West Virginia University in 1963. He received a Master of Science in Engineering in 1964 and a Doctor of Philosophy in 1967, both in mechanical engineering from the University of Michigan, where he later served as professor of mechanical engineering.

In 1979, Vest published Holographic Interferometry, a book about the theory and application of this technology to measurement problems.

Vest served as dean of the College of Engineering at the University of Michigan from 1986 to 1989 and provost of the university from 1989 to 1990. He then served as president of MIT from 1990 to 2004.

In 2004, a selection of Vest's speeches from his time as President of MIT was published under the title, Pursuing the Endless Frontier: Essays on MIT and the Role of Research Universities.

Harvard University awarded him an honorary Doctor of Laws in 2005. The University of Cambridge awarded him an Honorary Doctorate in Law in 2006. Tufts University awarded him an honorary Doctor of Science in 2011; he delivered a commencement speech at Tufts University the same year.

== Other activities ==
Vest served on the President’s Council of Advisors on Science and Technology and chaired the Task Force on the Future of Science Programs at the Department of Energy. At the request of President Bill Clinton, he chaired the Committee on the Redesign of the International Space Station, which revitalized the space station at a time when its future was in question. On February 6, 2004, he was appointed to the Iraq Intelligence Commission by President George W. Bush.

He was appointed the president of the National Academy of Engineering in 2007 and served until 2013. Vest was a member of the USA Science and Engineering Festival's advisory board. He was a Fellow of the American Academy of Arts & Sciences and served as co-chair of the academy's Science, Engineering & Technology Policy Program. In 2008, Vest was elected an honorary academician of Academia Sinica.

On December 12, 2013, he died of pancreatic cancer, aged 72.

Academic offices
Preceded by Paul E. Gray	15th President of the Massachusetts Institute of Technology; 1990 – 2004	Succeeded by Susan Hockfield
