= Capen =

Capen may refer to:

- 11696 Capen, main belt asteroid
- Capen (crater), crater on Mars
- Capen Street (MBTA station), station on MBTA's Ashmont-Mattapan High Speed Line
- Parson Capen House, built in 1683 as the home of local pastor the Reverend Joseph Capen
- Elisha Capen Monk, American businessman and politician

== Surname ==
- Charles L. Capen (1845–1927), Illinois lawyer
- Elmer Hewitt Capen (1838–1905), the third president of Tufts College (now Tufts University)
- Jerry Capen, fictional character on the American TV series The Larry Sanders Show
- Joseph Capen (1658–1725), minister in Topsfield, Massachusetts, from 1681 to his death
- Nahum Capen (1804–1886), American author and editor
- Richard Goodwin Capen Jr. (born 1934), American ambassador
- Ruth G. Capen (1893–1974), American chemist
- Samuel Capen (1848–1943), sheriff of Norfolk County, Massachusetts
- Samuel P. Capen (1878–1956), American educational administrator
- Stephen Capen (1946–2005), popular American radio announcer and disc jockey
