= Death of John O'Keefe =

2022 death in Canton, Massachusetts, US

John O'Keefe
- Born: John J. O'Keefe III; December 8, 1975; Braintree, Massachusetts, U.S.
- Died: January 29, 2022 (aged 46); Canton, Massachusetts, U.S.
- Cause of death: Blunt force trauma to the head
- Education: Northeastern University, University of Massachusetts Lowell
- Occupation: Police officer
- Employer: Boston Police Department
- Partner: Karen A. Read (2020–2022)

On January 29, 2022, at 6:03 am, John O'Keefe, an officer of the Boston Police Department, was found unconscious on the front lawn of fellow Boston police officer Brian Albert's house in Canton, Massachusetts. O'Keefe's girlfriend, financial analyst Karen Read, had dropped him off at a party at the Albert household shortly after midnight and returned early that morning to find his body after he failed to return home. O'Keefe was declared dead at 7:59 am at a local hospital. An autopsy performed two days later found that he had died of impact injuries to the head, although his manner of death was undetermined.

Read was subsequently arrested and charged with manslaughter, motor vehicle homicide, and leaving the scene of a motor vehicle collision causing death. Prosecutors alleged that she had killed O'Keefe by backing into him with her car after dropping him off. Read's defense team alleged that O'Keefe was murdered inside the Albert household, and that police officers involved in the case used their resources to taint the investigation and frame Read. Following a grand jury indictment, Read's charges were upgraded to second-degree murder, manslaughter while operating under the influence of alcohol, and leaving the scene of personal injury and death.

Read's first criminal trial resulted in a mistrial on July 1, 2024, due to a hung jury. She was tried a second time beginning on April 1, 2025, and found not guilty on all three major charges. She was found guilty of operating a vehicle under the influence, receiving the standard sentence of one year of probation.

The case received widespread media attention due in large part to a series of investigative articles published by local journalist Aidan Kearney (under the alias "Turtleboy"), who alleged a substantial police cover-up and maintained that Read was innocent. Kearney was arrested multiple times for witness intimidation related to his involvement in the Read case.

== Background ==
John J. O'Keefe III, nicknamed "J.J." or "Johnny" (born December 8, 1975), was raised in Braintree, Massachusetts, a suburb of Boston. He graduated from Braintree High School and later Northeastern University, going on to earn a master's degree in criminal justice from the University of Massachusetts, Lowell. Following the deaths of his sister and brother-in-law in 2013 and 2014 respectively, O'Keefe took guardianship of his niece and nephew, with whom he resided in Canton, Massachusetts. O'Keefe was a 16-year veteran of the Boston Police Department (BPD).

Karen A. Read (born February 26, 1980) grew up in Taunton, Massachusetts, and Blacksburg, Virginia. She graduated from Coyle & Cassidy, a private Catholic school in Taunton, and attended Bentley University in Waltham, Massachusetts, where she obtained both a bachelor's degree and a master's degree in finance. Until her arrest in February 2022, Read had been a financial analyst at Fidelity Investments since 2007 and was an adjunct professor at Bentley University. Read was living in Mansfield, Massachusetts, at the time of O'Keefe's death.

O'Keefe and Read met in 2004 and dated briefly. They rekindled their relationship in 2020 after connecting over Facebook during the COVID-19 pandemic.

== Incident ==
Locations of the bars, Brian Albert residence, and O'Keefe residence
1 34 Fairview Road, Brian Albert residence
2 Waterfall Bar & Grille
3 C.F. McCarthy's
4 1 Meadows Avenue, O'Keefe residence

On the evening of January 28, 2022, Read met O'Keefe for drinks at C.F. McCarthy's, a bar in Canton, around 9 pm. They moved to an establishment across the street, the Waterfall Bar & Grille, shortly before 11 pm. There, the couple met up with a group of acquaintances, including fellow BPD officer Brian Albert and his wife Nicole. As the bar was closing, the group was invited to the Albert household at 34 Fairview Road, where their son was celebrating his 23rd birthday with friends and family. Security footage shows Read and O'Keefe leaving the establishment together at 12:11 am. Others invited to the Albert household from the Waterfall that night include Nicole Albert's sister, Jennifer McCabe; her husband, Matthew McCabe; and Brian Higgins, an agent with the Bureau of Alcohol, Tobacco, Firearms and Explosives.

Read drove O'Keefe in her Lexus LX 570 to the Albert household, although she was unfamiliar with the neighborhood. Jennifer McCabe called O'Keefe at 12:14 am to give them directions; she and her husband arrived at the house at 12:18 am. Read and O'Keefe pulled up in front of the house about six minutes later, with O'Keefe's cellphone activity data showing the closure of a navigation app at 12:24:26 am and his location data showing the phone stopping in front of 34 Fairview Road at 12:24:38 am.

Between 12:24:59 am and 12:31:56 am, O'Keefe's cellphone activity data recorded no movement. Between 12:24:59 am and 12:25:09 am, O'Keefe's phone was unlocked with Face ID, a message from Jennifer McCabe was marked as read, and the phone was locked via the lock button. At 12:27:33 am, O'Keefe's cellphone received an iMessage from Jennifer reading, "Here!?", which the phone recorded as read at 12:27:48 am after being unlocked with Face ID. At 12:29:44 am, the phone logged a seven-second answered phone call from Jennifer; one second after hanging up the call, the phone was unlocked with Face ID, and one second after that, the phone was locked via the lock button at 12:29:53 am. At 12:31:47 am, the phone received an iMessage from Jennifer reading, "Pull behind me." According to Read, O'Keefe told her he would quickly check inside the house to ensure the couple were welcome. His cellphone data recorded movement activity it interpreted as 36 steps beginning at 12:31:56 am. During this activity, the phone was unlocked with Face ID at 12:32:04 am, recorded that Jennifer's "Pull behind me" text was read at 12:32:06 am, and recorded its final lock at 12:32:09 am. The movement activity the phone interpreted as 36 steps concluded at 12:32:16 am. No further movement from O'Keefe's phone was recorded until after 6 am.

Read said she watched O'Keefe enter the house. Richard D'Antuono, Ryan Nagel, and Heather Maxon, who arrived at 34 Fairview in D'Antuono's Ford F-150 shortly after Read to pick up Ryan Nagel's sister and partygoer Julie Nagel all testified that they saw Read sitting in her vehicle alone. Ryan Nagel also testified that he witnessed Read driving safely in the neighborhood. Brian Albert Sr., Nicole Albert, Brian Albert Jr., Caitlin Albert, Jennifer McCabe, Matthew McCabe, Sarah Levinson and Julie Nagel have testified that they were in the house during that time and did not see O'Keefe. Read said she grew impatient when O'Keefe did not come back out of the Albert household and started driving toward O'Keefe's house at 1 Meadows Avenue. Around the time she departed 34 Fairview Road, the prosecution argues her Lexus recorded a "Techstream" "trigger" event, the exact cause and timing of which were disputed at her criminal trials. Such trigger events can have several causes—including excessive acceleration (possibly over snow or ice), steering or braking—but not collisions per se. It is unclear whether this trigger event occurred during the key cycle in question or while the vehicle was in police custody.

Between 12:33:35 am and 12:36:40 am, O'Keefe's cellphone recorded seven unanswered calls from Read. Read connected to the Wi-Fi at O'Keefe's house at 12:36 am. After arriving there, she left him a succession of voicemails and iMessages. At 12:37, Read said in a voicemail, "John, I fucking hate you!" At 12:59 am, she said, "John, I'm here with the fucking kids. Nobody knows where the fuck you are. You fucking pervert." At 1:10 am, she said, "It's 1 in the morning. I'm with your fucking niece and your nephew. You fucking pervert. You're a fucking pervert!" At 1:17 am, she said, "John, I'm going home. I cannot believe [inaudible]. I need to go home. You are fucking using me right now. You're fucking another girl. [O'Keefe's niece] is sleeping next to me. You're a fucking loser. Fuck yourself!" Read's last call attempt for several hours was at 1:18 am, before she fell asleep next to O'Keefe's niece.

At 12:40 am, O'Keefe's cellphone received an unread iMessage from Jennifer McCabe—the first iMessage from her since 12:31 am—saying, "Hello." At 12:42 am, it received an unread iMessage from McCabe saying, "Where are u." At 12:45 am, it received another unread iMessage from McCabe saying, "Hello."

Over the course of the night, O'Keefe's cellphone recorded the following drop in battery temperature:

- 12:37 am: 72 °F
- 12:45 am: 66 °F
- 12:53 am: 61 °F
- 1:07 am: 55 °F
- 1:36 am: 50 °F
- 6:06 am: 43 °F
- 6:35 am: 37 °F

Between 12:33:14 am and 5:52:26 am, the phone's pocket state detection system automatically used its front camera 26,532 times to determine whether the view from the front camera (i.e., obstructed or unobstructed) was consistent with the phone being inside or outside of a pocket. At all times during that interval, the phone registered itself as in a pocket state. The phone had last recorded itself in a non-pocket state at 12:32:03 am, and it did not record itself in a non-pocket state again until 6:02:41 am.

At 4:38 am, Read woke and resumed trying to call O'Keefe after realizing he had not come home. At 4:53 am she called Jennifer McCabe from the niece's phone, asking her to help look for O'Keefe. At 5:00 am, Read called Kerry Roberts, a friend of O'Keefe's, to ask her to join them. Roberts later testified that Read initially yelled over the phone, "John is dead! Kerry! Kerry!" and hung up and, in a subsequent call, explained to Roberts that she feared John was dead and might have been hit by a snowplow. O'Keefe's niece later testified that she heard Read say on the phone statements to the effect of "Could I have done something?", "Could he have been hit by a plow?", and "Maybe I like...hit him."

At 5:07 am, Read was seen on O'Keefe's home's Ring security camera backing out of his garage in her Lexus. She visibly bumped O'Keefe's parked Chevrolet Traverse; the footage shows O'Keefe's car move slightly as the cars made contact. At precisely the same time, Jennifer McCabe called her sister Nicole Albert—the owner of 34 Fairview, where O'Keefe's body was found—that lasted 38 seconds. McCabe did not deny making the call, but denied speaking to Nicole that morning. After failing to find O'Keefe, Read drove to McCabe's home, where Roberts picked them up. The three women traveled back to O'Keefe's house to check if he had returned while Read was outside searching.

At around 6 am, Read, McCabe and Roberts arrived at 34 Fairview Road, where Read saw O'Keefe's body near a flagpole in the front yard. At 6:03 am, McCabe called 911 and reported "a man passed out in the snow", saying, "I think he's dead." Amid this discovery and subsequent emergency response, at 6:04:01 am, O'Keefe's cellphone health data registered the phone's first movement since 12:32:16 am. Jennifer and two paramedics later testified that, at the scene of the response, Read repeatedly said, "I hit him", although this was never recorded in any report. Read later said in interviews she only asked something to the effect of "Could I have hit him? Did I hit him?"

== Investigation ==
Former Massachusetts State Police (MSP) Trooper Michael D. Proctor, of the Norfolk State Police Detective Unit, was the lead investigator for the case. A 12-year veteran of the MSP, Proctor was fired on March 19, 2025, due to his actions during the investigation of O'Keefe's death, including having "sent derogatory, defamatory, disparaging, and/or otherwise inappropriate text message about a suspect in that investigation to other individuals" and "provided sensitive and/or potential investigative steps in the investigation to non-law enforcement personnel." On October 20, 2025, Proctor dropped his Civil Service Commission appeal to get his job back; a few days later, it was revealed that an extraction of Proctor's iCloud account revealed "highly sensitive information including images of intimate body parts of people not participating in the chat". On December 18, 2025, Proctor's certification was suspended by the Massachusetts POST Commission, permanently barring him from working in law enforcement in Massachusetts.

Sixteen hours into the investigation, and before O'Keefe's autopsy had been performed, Proctor openly discussed the case in a group text with high school friends. He wrote that they "won't be able to prove" that Read hit O'Keefe with her car, and that "All the powers that be want answers ASAP." When a friend sent the message, "I'm sure the owner of the house will receive some shit", Proctor replied: "Nope. Homeowner is a Boston cop too." He also called Read a "whack job cunt" and said "She's fucked" and "Zero chance she skates."

On January 31, 2022, an autopsy was performed on O'Keefe. The medical examiner, Irini Scordi-Bello, ruled that his cause of death was blunt force trauma to the head; she could not determine the manner of death. Subsequently, Proctor expressed frustration to his colleagues in not being able to influence her medical opinion. In a text thread, fellow Trooper DiCicco wrote to Proctor, "Rookie move not meeting with the ME and getting that homicide determination." Proctor replied, "Yuriy and I had two conference calls with her had numerous photos etc. We laid out the entire case for her" and "Of course it's inconclusive, she was a whack job."

On February 2, 2022, within hours of Read's arraignment, her attorney, David Yannetti, received an anonymous phone call from a man who said he had a background in Boston law enforcement. The man alleged that Brian Albert and his nephew, Colin Albert, had beaten O'Keefe to death inside 34 Fairview; afterward, Brian Albert and an "unnamed 'federal agent'" (now known to be Brian Higgins) dragged O'Keefe's body onto the lawn. This anonymous caller was revealed to be Stephen Scanlon, a local private investigator who gave a statement to authorities confirming that he sent the tip to Yannetti.

In April 2023, Read's attorneys presented a theory that implicated Brian and his sister-in-law, Jennifer McCabe, who had been drinking with Read and O'Keefe on January 28 and helped Read find O'Keefe's body the morning of January 29. Evidence showed that Brian sold his house and got rid of his dog after the incident, and Read's defense argued that Jennifer performed a Google search for "ho[w] long to die in cold" at 2:27 a.m., though prosecutors argued that was the time the tab used in the search was opened in the browser and not the time the search was actually made.

In January 2024, letters between the General Counsel for the U.S. Department of Justice and Norfolk District Attorney Michael W. Morrissey, were released, confirming a federal investigation was mounted into Morrissey's office.

== Legal proceedings ==
Commonwealth v. Read
- Court: Norfolk County Courthouse
- Full case name: Commonwealth of Massachusetts v. Karen Read
- Started: April 16, 2024
- Decided: June 18, 2025; 16 months ago
- Verdict: Not guilty on three major charges; guilty of operating under the influence
- Charge: Second-degree murder; Manslaughter while operating under the influence; Leaving the scene of a collision resulting in death

Case history
- Prior actions: Hung jury declared on July 1, 2024, for the first trial; retried on April 1, 2025
- Appealed to: Norfolk County Courthouse; Massachusetts Supreme Judicial Court; United States District Court for the District of Massachusetts; U.S. Supreme Court

Court membership
- Judge sitting: Beverly Cannone

On February 2, 2022, Read was arraigned in Stoughton District Court on charges of manslaughter, leaving the scene of an accident, and motor vehicle homicide. She pleaded not guilty and was released on $80,000 bail. In June 2022, a Norfolk County grand jury indicted Read for second-degree murder, motor vehicle manslaughter, and leaving the scene of a collision.

=== First trial ===
On March 12, 2024, Read's attorneys filed a motion to dismiss the case due to alleged conflicts of interest and federal crash reconstruction experts determining that O'Keefe's injuries were "inconsistent" with the damage to Read's car. The judge denied the motion on March 26 due to "extensive evidence supporting the indictments."

Read's first trial started on April 16, 2024. Prosecutors previously asked the judge to block Read's lawyers from arguing that others are to blame for O'Keefe's death, also known as third-party culprit defense. The judge instead offered the defense a chance to develop their argument through "relevant, competent, admissible evidence," but still barred them from using the third-party culprit defense during opening statements. On April 28, the prosecutors and the defense presented opening statements.

The prosecution was led by Adam Lally and Laura McLaughlin. Read was represented by criminal defense attorneys David R. Yannetti, Alan Jackson, and Elizabeth Little. Jackson and Little are partners at Werksman Jackson & Quinn LLP, a Los Angeles law firm.

The prosecution argued that Read intentionally ran O'Keefe over with her Lexus after a night of heavy drinking on January 29, 2022. They represented that pieces of Read's broken taillight were found at the scene, suggesting her vehicle was involved in the incident. A hair consistent with O'Keefe's (Note: Only mitochondrial DNA (mtDNA) from the hair could be obtained for analysis. This matched O'Keefe's, but mtDNA is not specific to one individual: It is shared by all those from the same matriline – that is, any relatives who share maternal-line ancestors.) was found on Read's car, which the prosecution maintained indicated contact from an impact by her car on O'Keefe. Accounts of arguments between the couple were heard from several witnesses, including testimony of an argument during their trip to Aruba in December 2021, which the prosecution put forward as evidence of a troubled relationship. Read's angry texts and voicemails on the night of January 29 were introduced into evidence as support for this. The prosecution argued Read's behavior on the morning O'Keefe's body was found did not match that of someone unaware of the incident.

The defense argued that Read was being framed as part of a law enforcement coverup to protect the real perpetrators, suggesting that O'Keefe was beaten inside the Albert household and then left outside to die in the snow, and that the close relationships between Trooper Michael Proctor and the Albert family created a conflict of interest and compromised the investigation. Proctor admitted to not initially disclosing his personal relationship with certain witnesses in the case. The defense also showed the jury the lack of integrity in the investigation, such as the use of Solo cups and Stop & Shop grocery bags during evidence collection and inappropriate text messages about Read between Proctor and personal acquaintances, including Proctor's assessment of Read's attractiveness and his hope that she would "kill herself." The defense showed Read's taillight intact after midnight on January 29, in contrast to the evidence of a shattered taillight, accusing the investigators of planting evidence, and also pointed to the mirrored sallyport video of Read's SUV at the Canton Police Department. The defense argued that the injuries on O'Keefe's body were not consistent with a car collision, which was confirmed by a number of experts, including two accident reconstruction experts obtained by the FBI and the medical examiner employed by the Commonwealth of Massachusetts. (Note: The two accident reconstruction experts work for ARCCA, an engineering consulting firm. It was not retained by the defense or prosecution, but by the Department of Justice and FBI as part of a federal investigation into Massachusetts state law enforcement's handling of this case.)

The Commonwealth rested its case on June 21, 2024, after eight weeks of testimony from 68 witnesses. The defense completed its list of witnesses and rested its case on June 24. Closing arguments were delivered on June 25 and jury deliberation started that day. On July 1, after 25 hours of deliberation, the jury was unable to come to a unanimous decision, citing "fundamental differences" in their beliefs; Cannone declared a mistrial.

Read's attorneys filed a motion to dismiss two of the charges, second-degree murder and leaving the scene of an accident, saying that several jurors reached out after the mistrial and indicated that the jury found Read not guilty on both of these charges. Martin G. Weinberg, a new attorney for the defense, argued for dismissal of the charges. On August 23, Cannone denied the motion to dismiss the charges. Read's attorneys filed an appeal to Massachusetts Supreme Judicial Court and also requested that the federal court drop two of the charges. Both requests were denied.

=== Second trial ===
Read's second trial began on April 1, 2025, with special deputy district attorney Hank Brennan, recognized for defending Whitey Bulger, leading the prosecution. New York-based attorney Robert Alessi and Victoria Brophey George were added to Read's defense team.

On the first day of trial, Read filed an emergency request to the U.S. Supreme Court to delay proceedings and dismiss two charges on double jeopardy grounds; both requests were denied. She faced three major charges: second-degree murder, manslaughter while operating under the influence, and leaving the scene of a collision resulting in death. The prosecution presented evidence related to Read's blood alcohol level, digital activity timelines, and forensic analysis of damage to her vehicle. Testimony included expert opinions on the alignment of injuries to O'Keefe with the alleged reverse impact from Read's Lexus. The prosecution rested its case on May 29, 2025.

The defense opened with testimony challenging the cause of O'Keefe's injuries, suggesting alternative explanations, including a dog bite. Disputes arose over late-stage questioning about DNA evidence, prompting a mistrial motion from the defense, which was denied. Additional defense testimony addressed the condition of Read's taillight and whether it had been altered after the incident. On June 11, 2025, the defense rested its case. Jury deliberations began two days later.

On June 18, Read was found not guilty on the three major charges; the jury did find her guilty of the lesser charge of operating under the influence (OUI). For this, she received a year's probation, which required Read's participation in the Commonwealth's 24(d) (Note: The 24(d) program is also known as the Massachusetts Impaired Driving Program (MID).) program; in addition to probation, she was required to receive outpatient treatment and her driver's license was suspended—the standard for a first-time offense.

== Civil lawsuits ==
=== Wrongful death lawsuit ===
On August 23, 2024, the O'Keefe family filed a wrongful death lawsuit against Read and two bars in Canton, accusing Read of hitting and killing O'Keefe and the bars of overserving her. The judge in the civil case, William White, ordered a stay of proceedings until the criminal case was resolved to protect Read's Fifth Amendment rights. Read is represented by three lawyers from the Boston law firm Melick & Porter, LLP in the civil case.

On June 8, 2026, former Massachusetts State Police officer Michael Proctor requested a rescheduled deposition, due to personal circumstances. Approximately 30 minutes after a private email was sent out to lawyers representing the case, documents appeared on social media site X, leading to Judge Mark Gildea ordering a warning against leaking court documents.

=== Read v. Massachusetts State Police ===
On June 4, 2026, Read filed a lawsuit against Massachusetts State Police and the Town of Canton Police Department, alleging "an embedded culture of bigotry, misogyny, systemic failures, and institutional rot at the very core of both organizations" that lead to her wrongful prosecution that spanned three years. The 87-page lawsuit was filed in Bristol County Superior Court, and claimed that both police organizations were deliberately focused on Read from the onset of the investigation. The lawsuit focused on two officers in particular, former Massachusetts State Police investigator Michael Proctor, who lead the Read investigation, and Canton Police sergeant Sean Goode, who responded to the scene initially. Both officers were let go from their respective positions after text messages were released referring to Read as a "whack job cunt" during the initial investigation, as well as lamenting that "no nudes" were found during preliminary searches of Read's cell phone

In response, lawyers for Michael Proctor said "it is a matter of undisputed fact that anything Mr. Proctor did or said in his personal life, years before Officer O'Keefe was killed, had no bearing whatsoever on the investigation of Karen Read" and that the focus was on "anything other than Ms. Read's own conduct"

== Impact ==
=== Impact on the community ===
Local journalist Aidan Kearney covered the case extensively on his website under the headline "Canton Cover-up" after the defense released its affidavit in April 2023. The case had received little media attention until Kearney began covering it; he went to Canton, filmed himself confronting witnesses and posted the videos on YouTube. Kearney was indicted on eight counts of witness intimidation, three counts of conspiracy to intimidate witnesses, and five counts of picketing a witness in December 2023. In February 2024, he was also indicted on two new charges of harassing a witness and intercepting wire or oral communication. Kearney pleaded not guilty.

The O'Keefe case caused divisions in Canton as residents debated whether Read killed O'Keefe or was framed. Social tensions and family feuds have reportedly been inflamed by the case. Following Kearney's coverage, a "rolling rally" of around 50 cars in support of the coverup theory drove through Canton in July 2023, stopping at the homes of key figures relating to the case and protesting via bullhorn. During the first trial, several Canton residents who supported Read spoke at Canton select board meetings, confronting Chris Albert and calling for accountability; three of them said their lawns were later vandalized with bleach balloons.

Near the end of the first trial, Kearney was dining with his girlfriend at C.F. McCarthy's, one of the bars O'Keefe and Read went to, and got into a confrontation outside with several people, one of whom was close to the Albert and Proctor families. Two people were later charged with the assault and battery of Kearney. Shortly after the first trial, Kearney found a dead turtle hanging outside his parents' home in Worcester, and local police investigated the incident as harassment and animal cruelty.

=== Recall election and independent audit ===
In August 2023, a citizen ballot initiative was proposed to add recall elections to the Massachusetts Constitution in response to Morrissey's perceived corruption in the case. In November, Canton held a special town meeting where residents voted in favor (903–800) of an independent audit of Canton police due to the ongoing investigation. The audit concluded in 2025 ahead of the second trial, and found that first responding officers did not photograph O'Keefe's body at the location where it was found before he was moved to the ambulance; interviews of critical witnesses were not conducted on the day after O'Keefe was transported to the hospital; witness interviews were not recorded; MSP and Canton police did not maintain a police presence at the Albert household pending the secondary search conducted by MSP crime scene units; and Canton police did not turn over video footage of Read's Lexus as it was impounded to lead investigators. Following the conclusion of the trial, an independent survey found that only 4% of registered voters in Canton supported Morrissey.

=== Protests outside courthouse ===
In early April 2024, ahead of the first trial, prosecutors filed a motion requesting a buffer zone to keep protesters back at least 500 feet (150 m) from the courthouse; Cannone later ordered a 200-foot (61 m) buffer zone after the ACLU filed a memorandum opposing the prosecution's request, citing freedom of speech, and urged the court to consider more narrowly tailored restrictions. Ahead of the second trial, Read's supporters filed a federal lawsuit against Cannone on the grounds of free speech; a federal judge ruled the buffer zone does not violate protesters' First Amendment free speech rights.

During the first trial, Cannone approved the prosecution's request to prohibit anyone inside the courtroom from wearing any attire related to the case, and also prohibit law enforcement officers, whether they be testifying or attending the trial, from wearing their uniforms. Protesters gathered outside the courthouse wearing pink on every court day, cheering for Read and taking photos with her and her lawyers.

=== Repercussions for witnesses ===
After the first trial, Proctor was relieved of duty, formally transferred out of the Norfolk State Police Detective Unit, and suspended without pay on July 8. In March 2025, he was fired by the MSP, after a trial board determined that he sent inappropriate text messages about a suspect and provided "sensitive and/or potential investigative steps in the investigation to non-law enforcement personnel." He was also found guilty of unsatisfactory performance and violating policy on alcoholic beverages. Following the conclusion of the second trial, Proctor filed to have his termination overturned. That October, he withdrew his appeal after his legal team dropped him after being informed of content found during his iCloud extraction. Sergeant Yuri Bukhenik, one of the investigators in the case, was suspended and then transferred to an administrative role within the MSP as a result of his actions in the investigation. In December 2025, the Massachusetts POST Commission suspended Proctor's certification, barring him from working in law enforcement in the state of Massachusetts.

On July 10, 2024, Canton police placed Detective Kevin Albert, the brother of 34 Fairview homeowner Brian Albert, on leave based on testimony and evidence from the trial. Texts from Michael Proctor revealed that Albert became inebriated on duty and "forgot his gun and badge in Proctor's cruiser". That September, it was announced he would face a three-day suspension without pay after an internal investigation. Canton Police Chief Helena Rafferty said that Albert "behaved in a way that was unbecoming of a police officer and violated department policies about alcohol consumption or possession on the job."

On September 15, 2025, Officer Kelly Dever resigned from the Boston Police Department. On the morning of O'Keefe's death, Dever was working dispatch for the Canton Police Department, where she had access to security camera feed from inside the building. In August 2023, she reported to the Federal Bureau of Investigation that she saw ATF agent Brian Higgins and former Canton Police Chief Kenneth Berkowitz inside the sally port alone with Read's vehicle for a "wildly long time." She has since recanted this statement, testifying during Read's retrial that this was a "false memory".

On November 3, 2025, Canton Police Department announced that Officer Sean Goode was placed on administrative paid leave after allegations of misconduct related to the investigation of Massachusetts State Police Trooper Michael Proctor. Goode was a prosecution witness in Read's first trial. Amid an internal investigation into his alleged misconduct, Goode resigned from the Canton Police Department effective June 2, 2026.

=== Grand juror criminal contempt charge ===
On July 11, 2025, a Dracut, Massachusetts, woman was charged with one count of criminal contempt by the U.S. District Attorney's Office. The defendant is alleged to have "disclosed sealed information to unauthorized individuals, including the names of various witnesses appearing before a federal grand jury, the substance of witness testimony and other evidence presented to the grand jury." On July 15, the defendant signed a plea agreement that recommended that she be sentenced to "one day, deemed served" at the discretion of a judge. On the same day, The Boston Globe published an article stating that unnamed sources revealed the defendant was a grand juror in the O'Keefe case. The U.S. Attorney's Office made no such statement.

== In media ==
- In July 2024, Netflix announced a three-part documentary on the case.
- 20/20 released an episode about the case in September 2024.
- Dateline NBC aired an episode on the case on October 18, 2024.
- A ten-part narrative podcast series, 34 Fairview Road, was released on October 17, 2024.
- A Body in the Snow: The Trial of Karen Read, a five-part docuseries by Investigation Discovery, aired over three nights, beginning March 17, 2025.
- In August 2025, it was announced that a limited series was in development from Prime Video and Warner Bros. Television Studios. Based on the podcast Karen, David E. Kelley serves as executive producer, alongside Justin Noble, who also serves as showrunner and writer, Matthew Tinker, Matt Kelley, Jen Sargent, Marshall Lewy, Aaron Hart, Jeni Mulein, Rachel Stockman, Dan Abrams, Max Handelman, Krissy Walland, and Elizabeth Banks who stars as Read. In October 2026, the series was greenlit by Prime Video.
- A Lifetime television movie, Accused: The Karen Read Story, premiered on January 10, 2026, starring Katie Cassidy as Read.

== Connection to other cases ==
The lawyer for Brian Walshe, the Cohasset man accused of murdering his wife, Ana Walshe, said he would file a motion suggesting Proctor's bias played a role in his client's case.

In February 2021, Sandra Birchmore, a 23-year-old woman from Stoughton, Massachusetts, was found dead in her Canton apartment. In both the Birchmore and O'Keefe investigations, federal intervention led to different conclusions than the investigations by local police. Her death was initially ruled a suicide, but these findings by local authorities were contradicted by federal investigators who alleged that foul play was involved. Detective Matthew Farwell of Stoughton police allegedly groomed Birchmore, initiating a sexual relationship with her when she was 15 years old. Birchmore became pregnant in 2020 and informed Farwell that he was the father, although it was later revealed that he was not. On November 10th, 2026, Farwell was convicted of murdering Birchmore and her unborn child.

Read's attorneys have sought police documents related to the Birchmore case and officers involved in both cases, including Norfolk Attorney Michael Morrissey, Canton Police Sergeant Michael Lank, Canton Police Detective Kevin Albert, Massachusetts State Police Detective Brian Tully, and Lieutenant John Fanning.
