= Dennis Xavier DeSouza =

- Born: Stoughton, Massachusetts
- Occupation: Author
- Notable work: In It To Win It

Dennis Xavier DeSouza is an American author and Luxury Homes industry expert selling in La Jolla, and on luxury buyer internet lead generation.

== Early life ==
Dennis Xavier DeSouza was born as first generation American with father born in the Azores and mother born in São Paulo, Brazil. He was born in Stoughton, Massachusetts and raised in Brockton.

== Career ==
DeSouza has been working as an industry expert in the real estate industry and has been reported to have represented the buyer who bought, the professional golfer, Phil Mickelson's home apart from a number of other notable buyers. He coaches and trains Real Estate agents on the subjects of team building, and running a profitable Real Estate team, internet lead generation and targeting high end buyers and sellers.

In 2012, his book, In It To Win It, co authored with Tom Hopkins Reached # 2 on Amazaon.com best sellers list for “Direct Marketing”. He has been featured on the Wealth TV series Behind the Gates and on Blog talk radio's Money for Lunch.
