= Michael W. Morrissey =

American politician (born 1954)

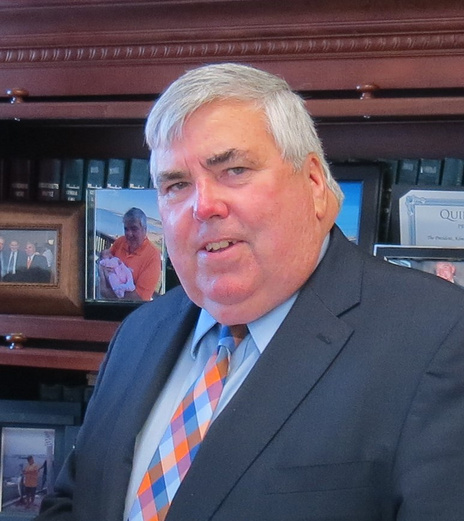

Massachusetts District Attorney for the Norfolk District
- Incumbent
- Assumed office January 2, 2011
- Preceded by: Bill Keating

Member of the Massachusetts Senate from the Norfolk and Plymouth district
- In office 1993 – January 2, 2011
- Preceded by: Paul D. Harold
- Succeeded by: John F. Keenan

Member of the Massachusetts House of Representatives
- In office 1976–1993
- Preceded by: Joseph E. Brett
- Succeeded by: Michael G. Bellotti
- Constituency: 3rd Norfolk (1977-1979); 1st Norfolk (1979-1993)

Personal details
- Born: August 2, 1954 (age 72) Quincy, Massachusetts, U.S.
- Party: Democratic
- Education: University of Massachusetts Amherst
- Occupation: Public servant
- Website: www.nfkda.com

Michael W. Morrissey (born August 2, 1954) is an American lawyer and politician serving as the District Attorney of Norfolk County, Massachusetts, since 2011. He was first elected in 2010 and is currently serving his fourth term.

A member of the Democratic Party, he previously represented the Norfolk and Plymouth district in the Massachusetts Senate (1992–2010) and the 1st Norfolk and 3rd Norfolk districts in the Massachusetts House of Representatives (1977–1993). Following controversy related to the investigations of Karen Read and the killing of Sandra Birchmore, Morrissey announced that he will not be seeking re-election in 2026.

== Biography ==
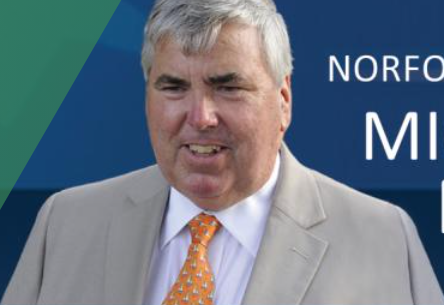

Morrissey is a native and lifelong resident of Quincy, Massachusetts. After graduating from North Quincy High School in 1972, he earned his bachelor's degree in history from the University of Massachusetts at Amherst and a Masters in Public Administration from Western New England College. Morrissey earned a Juris Doctor from Suffolk University Law School in 1985 and was admitted to the Massachusetts Bar Association on December 17, 1985.

He began his thirty-plus year career as a legislator upon election to the Massachusetts House of Representatives, representing the 3rd Norfolk district from 1976 to 1979 and the 1st Norfolk district from 1979 to 1993. He was then elected to the Massachusetts Senate, where he served as state senator for the Norfolk and Plymouth district, representing the City of Quincy and towns of Abington, Braintree, Hanover, Holbrook, and Rockland from 1993 to 2010.

Morrissey's first term as Norfolk District Attorney began after winning the 2010 District Attorney General Election. He was sworn in early, on January 2, 2011, to succeed William R. Keating, who had resigned from his position as Norfolk DA to serve in the United States House of Representatives.

== Electoral history ==
2022 Massachusetts Norfolk County District Attorney General Election
Party	Candidate	Votes	%
Democratic	Michael W. Morrissey	208,563	98.2
Write-in		3,750	1.8
Total votes		212,313	100.0
	Blank	75,606	
Turnout		287,919	

2018 Massachusetts Norfolk County District Attorney General Election
Party	Candidate	Votes	%
Democratic	Michael W. Morrissey	231,828	98.8
Write-in		2,869	1.2
Total votes		234,697	100.0
	Blank	77,455	
Turnout		312,152	

2014 Massachusetts Norfolk County District Attorney General Election
Party	Candidate	Votes	%
Democratic	Michael W. Morrissey	173,820	98.9
Write-in		1,993	1.1
Total votes		175,813	100.0
	Blank	78,414	
Turnout		254,227	

2010 Massachusetts Norfolk County District Attorney General Election
Party	Candidate	Votes	%
Democratic	Michael W. Morrissey	147,645	60.2
Independent	John. F Coffey	97,456	39.7
Write-in		354	.1
Total votes		175,813	100.0
	Blank	22,924	
Turnout		273,538	

== Controversy ==
Two cases involving Norfolk District Attorney Morrissey's office, the deaths of John O'Keefe and Sandra Birchmore, have cast public doubt on prosecutorial integrity and law enforcement accountability. These allegations led to the launch of a federal probe, as well as an independent audit of the Canton Police Department by the firm 5 Stones Intelligence, which uncovered evidence of "antiquated policing."

=== Commonwealth vs. Karen Read ===
Norfolk District Attorney Morrissey's office announced the arrest of Karen Read on February 2, 2022 in connection with the death of her boyfriend, Boston Police Officer John O'Keefe. O'Keefe was found unconscious on the front lawn of fellow Boston Police Officer, Brian Albert, in Canton. Read was initially charged with manslaughter.

On June 9, 2022, the Norfolk District Attorney's office issued a press release stating that Karen Read had again been taken into custody by the Massachusetts State Police. A new warrant had been issued following a decision by a Norfolk County grand jury to indict Read for felony criminal charges including homicide, motor vehicle homicide while operating under the influence, and leaving the scene of an accident causing personal injury resulting in death.

On Friday, August 25, 2023, before the trial even began, District Attorney Morrissey's office released a pre-recorded video statement declaring Read's guilt and defending the innocence of the witnesses of the case. He claimed that the "constitutional presumption of innocence" should be afforded to these witnesses, who were not on trial, yet did not defend the same right for Read.

Read's first trial resulted in a mistrial on July 1, 2024, due to a hung jury. On June 18, 2025, Read's retrial resulted in a verdict of "not guilty" on all major charges. She was found guilty of operating a vehicle under the influence, receiving the standard sentence of one year probation. Morrissey's only comment was, "The jury has spoken."

=== Killing of Sandra Birchmore ===
On February 4, 2021, 23-year-old Sandra Birchmore, a native of Stoughton, Massachusetts, was found dead in her Canton, Massachusetts apartment following a wellness check. She was three months pregnant at the time. Her death was initially ruled a suicide by the state medical examiner, and in a 2022 statement, the Norfolk District Attorney's Office spokesperson said their initial investigation “found no evidence of foul play” in Birchmore's death.

Federal authorities later determined that her death was a homicide, alleging that a former Stoughton Police Officer, Matthew Farwell, murdered Birchmore, tampered with her digital devices, and staged the scene to appear as if the victim had taken her own life. Farwell's federal indictment was announced by acting U.S. Attorney Joshua S. Levy at a nationally-broadcast press conference in August 2024.

Authorities allege Birchmore and Farwell had a sexual relationship for years, beginning in 2013 when the two were 15 and 27, respectively. Farwell reportedly forced her to participate in violent rape fantasies. In late 2020, Birchmore informed Farwell that she was pregnant, believing that Farwell was the father, though a DNA test in June 2025 revealed that Farwell was not the father of Birchmore's unborn child.Before her death, Birchmore disclosed to several people that Farwell had been physically violent with her.Farwell was convicted of murdering Birchmore and her unborn child in November 2026.
