= Senator Monk =

Senator Monk may refer to:

- Elisha Capen Monk (1828–1898), Massachusetts State Senate
- Robert W. Monk (1866–1924), Wisconsin State Senate
