= Stoughton High School =

Location
- 232 Pearl Street; Stoughton, Massachusetts 02072; United States
- Coordinates: 42°7′49″N 71°6′31″W

Information
- Type: Public
- Established: 1923; 103 years ago
- School district: Stoughton Public Schools
- Superintendent: Dr. Joseph Baeta
- Principal: Juliet Miller
- Teaching staff: 106.39 (FTE)
- Grades: 9–12
- Enrollment: 1,097 (2023–2024)
- Average class size: 20
- Student to teacher ratio: 10.31
- Campus: Suburban
- Colors: Orange and Black
- Athletics: Division I
- Athletics conference: Hockomock League
- Sports: Cheerleading, Football, Marching Band, Basketball, Wrestling, Baseball, Color Guard, Volleyball, Swimming, Wrestling, Softball, Golf, Soccer, Field Hockey, Hockey, Lacrosse, Cross Country, Indoor Track, Track and Field.
- Mascot: Black Knight
- Rival: Canton High School, Oliver Ames High School
- Accreditation: NEASC
- Newspaper: The Knight
- Yearbook: The Stotonian
- Website: shs.stoughtonschools.org

Stoughton High School (SHS) is a public high school the town of Stoughton, Massachusetts, United States. It serves students in grades 9 to 12 and is a part of Stoughton Public Schools. It has around an average of 300 students per grade level. It is located on 232 Pearl Street in Stoughton, Massachusetts. The principal is Juliette Miller. SHS is known for their award-winning marching band and color guard, known as the Marching Black Knights.

Ryan Augusta is expected to become the next principal of Stoughton High School, beginning on 1 July, 2026.

== History ==
Originally built in 1923, Stoughton High School had multiple additions before being completely rebuilt.

The Stoughton High School Building Committee voted on Thursday, November 12, 2015 to recommend to the Massachusetts School Building Authority (MSBA) that the Town construct option C2A, to build a new Stoughton High School. The preliminary cost analysis for the total project is estimated to be $126,137,847. The projected state reimbursement is estimated at $54,598,291. The Town’s protected share of the cost is estimated to be $71,539,557.

== Sports ==
The Stoughton High School mascot is the Black Knights and the colors are orange and black.

Fall sports at Stoughton High School include football, marching band, volleyball, cross country, soccer, golf, field hockey, and cheerleading. Winter sports include boys basketball, girls basketball, swimming, indoor track and field, ice hockey, wrestling, and cheerleading. Spring sports include lacrosse, softball, baseball, track and field, and tennis.

== Notable alumni ==
- Gerard O'Neill, 1960, journalist
- Paula J. Olsiewski, biochemist
- Bruce Douglass, 1971, former professional golfer
- Robert Lanza, 1974, scientist
- Darin Jordan, 1983, former NFL player
- Lori McKenna, c. 1986, folk singer/songwriter
- Ed McGuinness, comic book artist
- Ryan LaCasse, c. 2001, former NFL player
- Kenny Wormald, 2002, professional dancer
- Fred Richard, c. 2022, American Olympian
