= Stoughton Police Department =

Police Department in Massachusetts

The Stoughton Police Department is the primary law enforcement agency serving the town of Stoughton in the U.S. state of Massachusetts. Stoughton is located in Norfolk County, approximately 17 miles south of Boston.

== History ==
The Stoughton Police Department has roots dating back to the town's early history, evolving from a system of constables and tithing men in the 18th century to a formal police force in the late 19th century. The department was established in 1878 with the appointment of six special police officers. Over the years, it grew in size and capabilities. By 1941, the department had modern facilities in the Town House, a cruiser car with one-way radio, and a reputation for efficiency.

== Controversies and Notable Cases ==
The department has been the subject of numerous controversies. In August 2024, former Stoughton Police Detective Matthew Farwell was indicted on federal charges related to the death of Sandra Birchmore, a former member of the Police Explorers, in February 2021. The indictment alleges that Farwell killed Birchmore to prevent her from disclosing information about his alleged commission of federal crimes, including coercion and enticement of a minor, deprivation of rights under color of law, and wire fraud.

The case involves allegations that Farwell began a sexual relationship with Birchmore when she was 15 years old and he was an instructor in the Police Explorers program. The relationship allegedly continued for years, including while Farwell was employed as a Stoughton Police officer.

Farwell was placed on administrative leave following Birchmore's death and later resigned from the department in April 2022. The case gained significant attention due to its serious nature and the involvement of multiple police officers.

In response to the indictment, Stoughton Police Chief Donna McNamara issued a statement noting that the department had conducted an internal affairs investigation following Sandra Birchmore's death in February 2021 and had cooperated with other agencies, including the FBI.
