= Ahavath Torah (Stoughton, Massachusetts) =

Conservative synagogue in Massachusetts, US

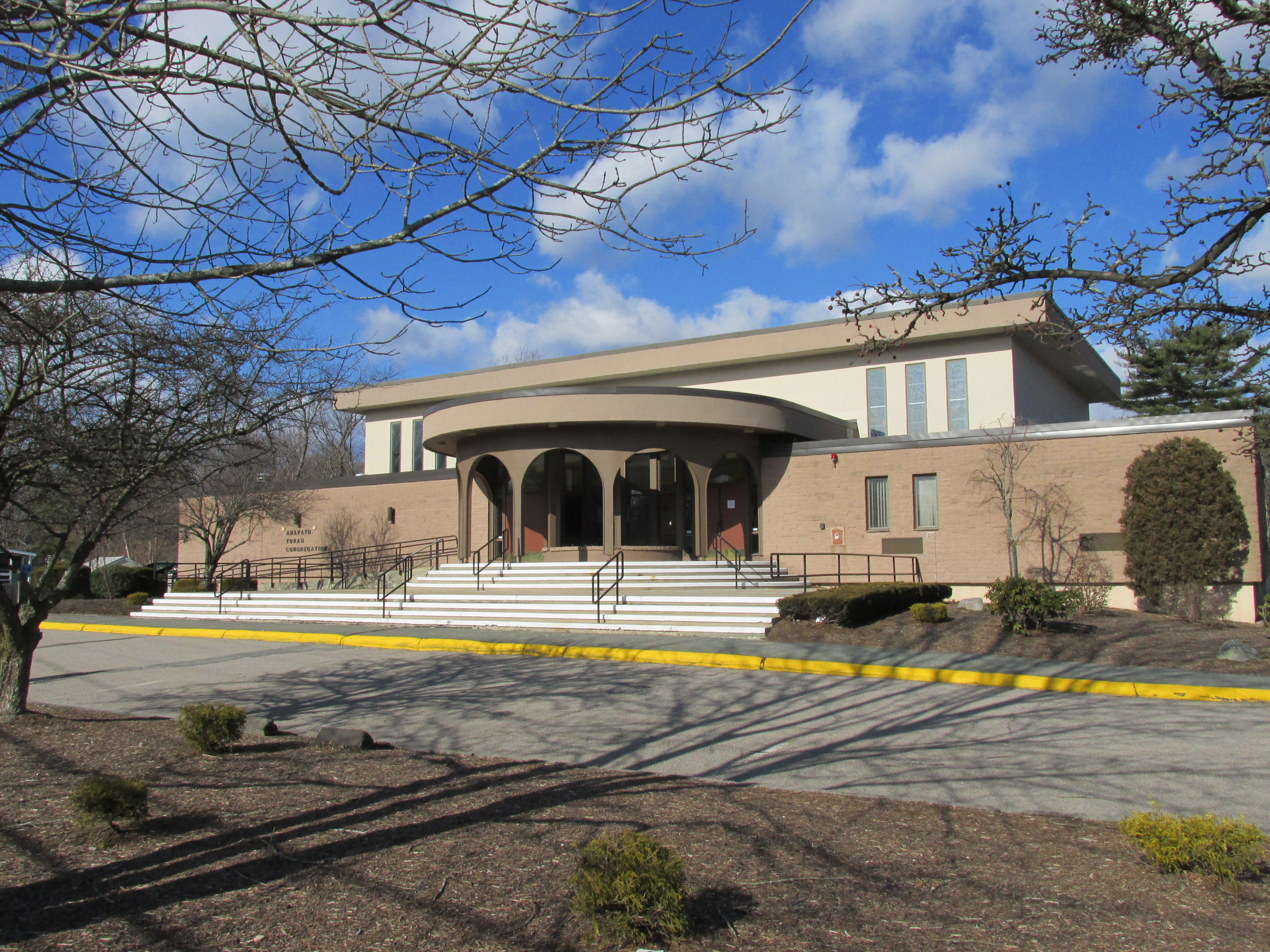

- Location in Massachusetts

Religion
- Affiliation: Conservative Judaism
- Ecclesiastical or organisational status: Synagogue
- Leadership: Rabbi Jonathan Hausman
- Status: Active

Location
- Location: 1179 Central Street, Stoughton, Massachusetts
- Country: United States
- Coordinates: 42°08′06″N 71°06′29″W

Architecture
- Established: 1893 (forebears); 1919 (merged congregation)
- Completed: 1970

Website
- atorah.org

Ahavath Torah is a Conservative synagogue located at 1179 Central Street, Stoughton, Massachusetts, in the United States. Formed as a merger of two older congregations founded in the 1890s, it is the oldest synagogue in Stoughton.

== History ==
Congregation Ahavath Achim was formed in Stoughton in 1893. Congregation Talmud Torah was formed in Stoughton soon after, in 1895. Both congregations worshiped in various houses. In 1918, the congregations merged with the Hebrew Benevolent Society to form Ahavath Torah Congregation, with 25 members, and Rev. M. L. Graham as its spiritual head. That year the congregation began construction of its first synagogue building on Porter Street, which was dedicated on October 14, 1919. The congregation was, however, only officially incorporated on September 5, 1930.

In 1954, Ahavath Achim opened its religious school. In need of a larger synagogue building, it purchased and moved into the former Congregational Church at 30 Pearl Street in 1958. As Stoughton's Jewish population grew, membership increased to 72 families, and land was purchased in three stages for a new synagogue. The present building at 1179 Central Street was dedicated in 1970. Further growth led to a significant renovation and expansion of the synagogue building, which was completed in 1987.

== Overview ==
The synagogue has hosted many notable guest speakers, including Geert Wilders, Wafa Sultan, and Dr. Mordechai Kedar, as well as entertainment from singer Sam Glaser, and a Bob Lazarus memorial show.

Congregational rabbis have included Henry Gerson, David Oler, Harold Schechter, and Steven Conn. As of 2010, the rabbi is Jonathan Hausman.
