= Canton High School (Massachusetts) =

Public school in Canton, Massachusetts, United States

Coordinates: 42.1625°N 71.145278°W

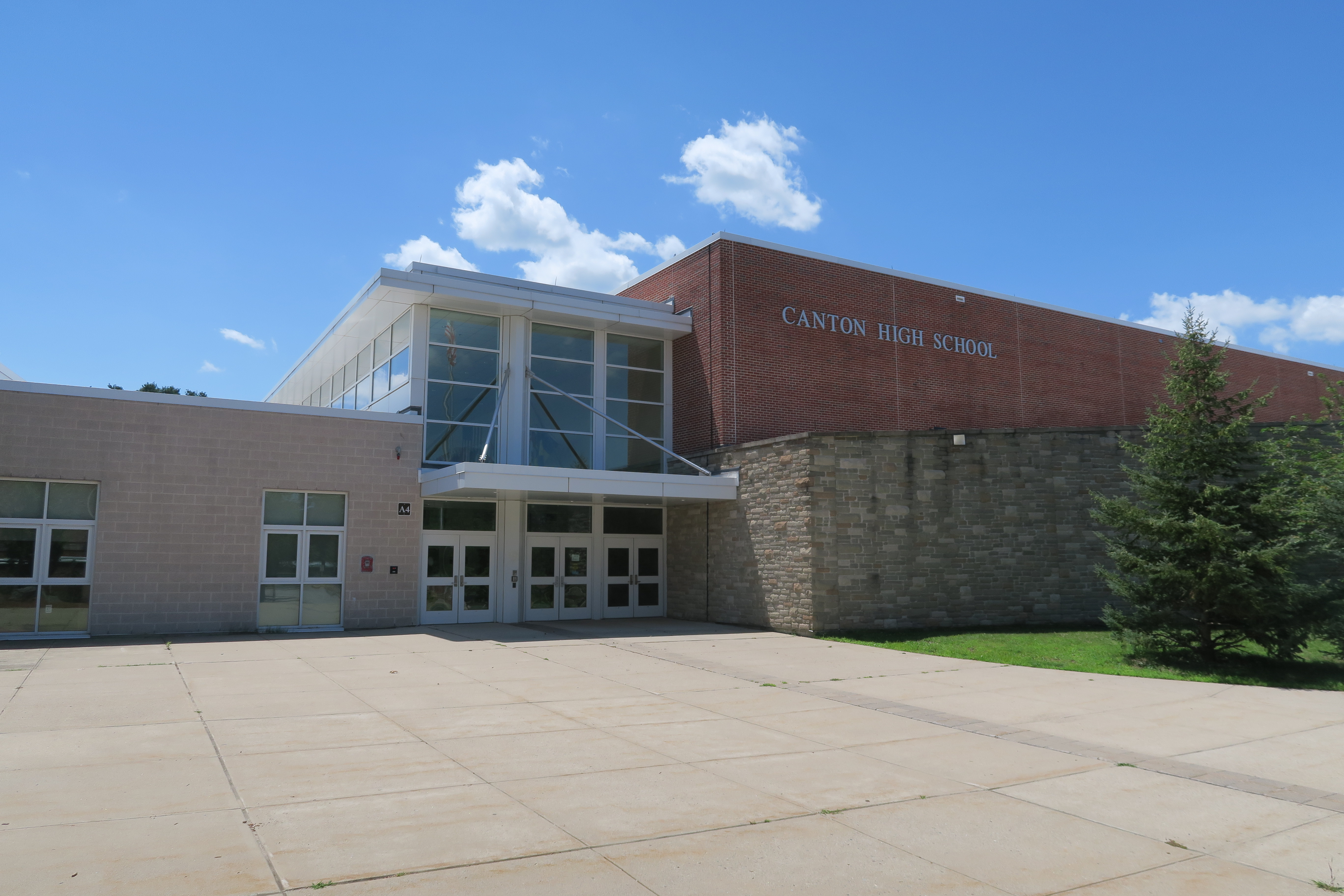
- Canton High School

Location
- 900 Washington Street; Canton, (Norfolk County), Massachusetts 02021; United States

Information
- Type: Public
- Established: 1869
- Superintendent: Derek Folan
- Principal: Jeffrey Sperling
- Teaching staff: 70.52 (FTE)
- Grades: 9–12
- Enrollment: 931 (2023–2024)
- Student to teacher ratio: 13.20
- Campus: Suburban
- Color: Green White
- Athletics: Division 2
- Athletics conference: Hockomock League
- Mascot: Bulldog
- Team name: Bulldogs
- Rival: Stoughton High School
- Website: www.cantonma.org/chs

Canton High School (CHS) is a secondary school in Canton, Massachusetts, United States.

== History ==
Canton High School is situated in Canton, about 15 mi (24 km) southwest of downtown Boston. First discussed in 1866 among prominent members of the town of Canton, the high school was established in 1869, when, for the first time, four classes were educated in the same building at a grammar school in South Canton.

In 1911 the Hemenway School became Canton's principal high school due to the population increase and a need for a larger building. It became an elementary school in 1950 after high school students transferred to a new building.

== Statistics ==
The student body makeup is 49 percent male and 51 percent female, and the total minority enrollment is 24 percent.

== Sports ==
Canton High School's athletic teams compete in the Hockomock League.

In November 2019 Canton won the girls volleyball Division II state championship.

== Notable staff ==
- Martin J. Badoian, mathematics teacher

== Notable alumni ==
- Chuck Hogan, a novelist
- Bobby Witt, a former baseball player for the Texas Rangers
- Bill Burr, a stand-up comedian, actor, writer, and podcaster
- Kevin Rooney, hockey player for the New Jersey Devils
- Steve Rooney, former professional ice hockey player
