= Alonzo Ames Miner =

American universalist and university president (1814–1895)

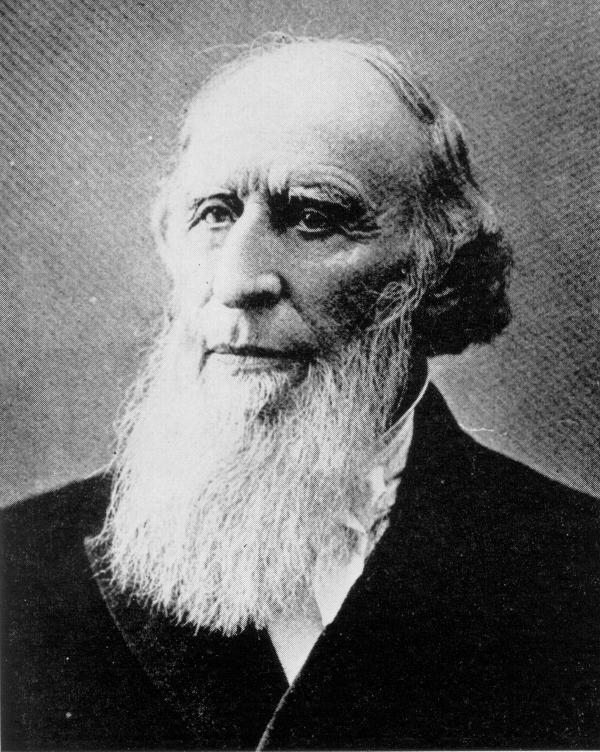

2nd President of Tufts College
- In office 1862–1875
- Preceded by: Hosea Ballou II
- Succeeded by: Elmer Hewitt Capen

Personal details
- Born: August 17, 1814 Lempster, New Hampshire
- Died: June 14, 1895 (aged 80) Boston, Massachusetts
- Spouse: Maria S. Perley m. August 1836
- Profession: Universalist Minister

Alonzo Ames Miner (August 17, 1814 – June 14, 1895) was a Universalist minister. He was the second president of Tufts University.

== Origins ==
Born in Lempster, New Hampshire, he was the second of five children and only son of Benajah Ames and Amanda (Carey) Miner. His father was a descendant of the colonist Thomas Miner.

He married Maria S. Perley in August 1836.

== Career ==
He taught school in rural Vermont and New Hampshire before being ordained a Universalist minister in 1839. He served as pastor to churches in Methuen, Lowell, and Boston, Massachusetts.

Miner supported many moral and civic causes, at various times serving on the Board of Trustees at Tufts College, the Board of Overseers at Harvard (appointed 1863), the Massachusetts Board of Education (from 1869, serving 24 years), the Board of Visitors to the Massachusetts normal school. For 21 years, he was president of the Massachusetts State Temperance Alliance, and he was the Prohibition candidate for Governor of Massachusetts in 1878. One of the founders of Tufts, he rescued the college from near bankruptcy and instituted many new educational programs as president from 1862 to 1875.

Alonzo Ames Miner died at his home in Boston on June 14, 1895.

== Footnotes ==
Academic offices
Preceded by Hosea Ballou II	2nd President of Tufts College; 1862–1875	Succeeded by Elmer Hewitt Capen
