= Kevin Rooney (ice hockey) =

American ice hockey player (born 1993)

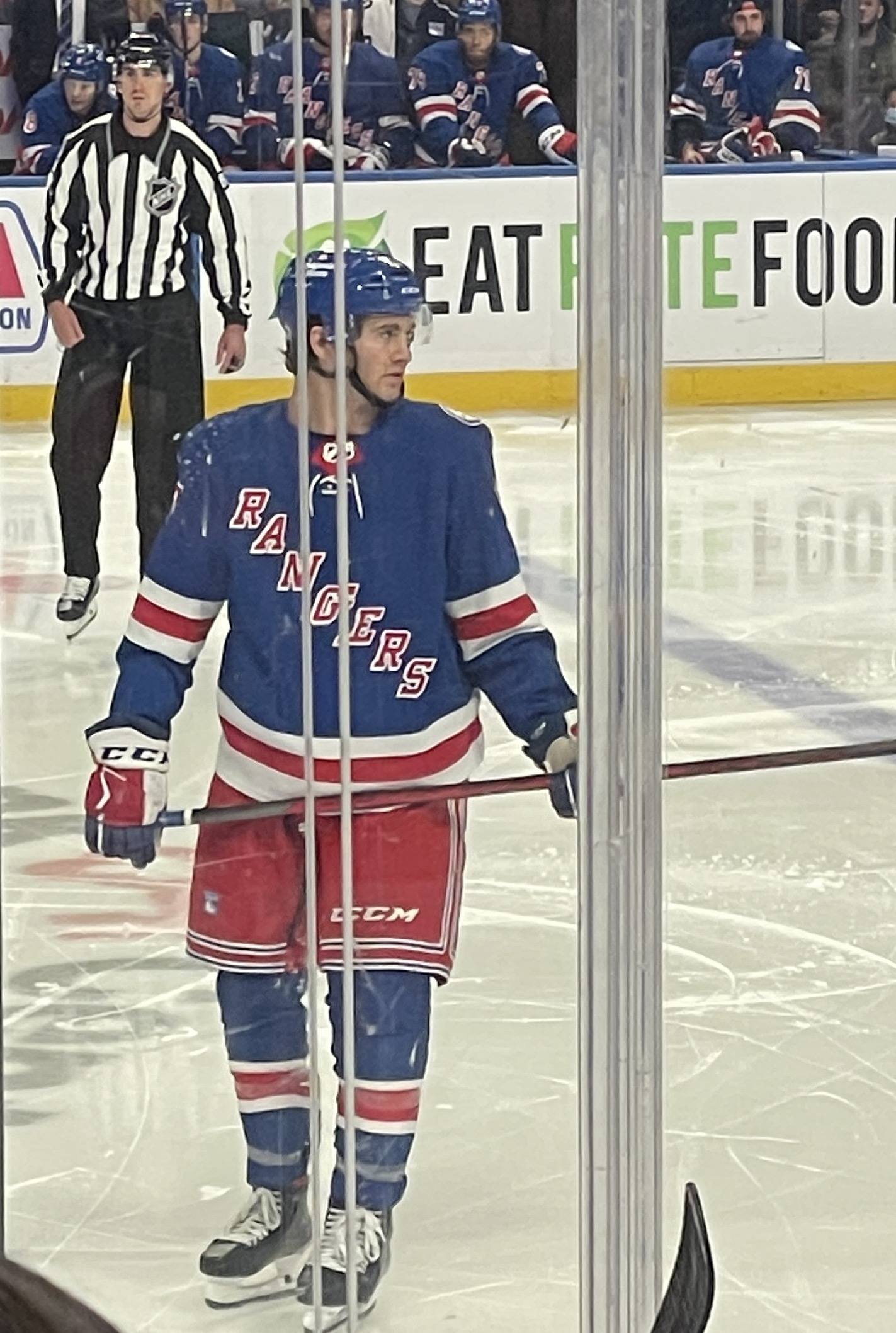
- Rooney with the New York Rangers in 2021
- Born: May 21, 1993 (age 33) Canton, Massachusetts, U.S.
- Height: 6 ft 2 in (188 cm)
- Weight: 190 lb (86 kg; 13 st 8 lb)
- Position: Center
- Shoots: Left
- AHL team Former teams: Tucson Roadrunners; New Jersey Devils; New York Rangers; Calgary Flames; Utah Mammoth
- National team: United States
- NHL draft: Undrafted
- Playing career: 2016–present

Kevin Rooney (born May 21, 1993) is an American professional ice hockey player who is a center for the Tucson Roadrunners in the American Hockey League (AHL).

Growing up in Canton, Massachusetts, Rooney won two state championships at two different high schools. He first won a Division 2 State championship with the Canton High School Bulldogs before transferring to Berkshire School and winning the 2012 NEPSAC Martin/Earl tournament. After going undrafted into the National Hockey League's Entry Draft, Rooney played four seasons with Providence College from 2012 to 2016. Following his senior year, Rooney signed a professional contract with the Albany Devils of the American Hockey League.

== Personal life ==
Rooney was born on May 21, 1993, in Canton, Massachusetts, to parents Dave and Dawn Rooney. Dave and his brother Steve both played ice hockey at Canton High School, a school that Rooney and his brother Bryan would later attend. Beyond his father, Rooney's cousins Joe and Chris played NCAA college ice hockey while his uncle Steve won a Stanley Cup with the Montreal Canadiens.

== Playing career ==
Growing up in Canton, Rooney played alongside his older brother Bryan at Canton High School for the Canton Bulldogs in the Hockomock League. As a sophomore, Rooney scored an empty-net goal in the Division 2 State championship to lead the Bulldogs to a 2010 title. After winning a state championship in 2010, Rooney transferred to the Berkshire School where he played hockey and baseball. Although he was eligible for graduation in 2011, Rooney chose to repeat his junior year at the Berkshire School. In his final year with the Berkshire Bears, he helped them defeat St. Sebastian's in overtime to claim the 2012 NEPSAC Martin/Earl tournament championship title. Over his two years at Berkshire, Rooney totalled 58 points and earned MVP honors in the Large School playoffs. Prior to graduating from Berkshire, Rooney committed to attend Providence College.

=== Collegiate ===
After going undrafted into the National Hockey League (NHL), Rooney was a walk-on freshman with the Providence College Friars of the Hockey East conference. He played with the Friars for four years from 2012 to 2016 while majoring in finance. As a freshman, Rooney was a fourth-line winger for the Friars while his cousin Chris, who was a senior, was a second-line winger. Rooney played in 29 games for the Friars during the 2012–13 season after making his NCAA debut on October 12 against Sacred Heart. He scored his first collegiate goal during the Friars Hockey East Semifinals loss to the UMass-Lowell River Hawks on March 22, 2014. He finished his freshman campaign with one goal and three assists for four points.

Rooney missed the beginning of the 2013–14 season due to a preseason injury but recorded an assist in his season debut against the Miami RedHawks on October 25. Unlike in his freshman season, Rooney played the majority of the 2013–14 season as the Friars fourth-line center. In this new role, he helped the Friars qualify for the Hockey East Semifinals against the fourth-seeded New Hampshire Wildcats and scored the team's only goal in their 3–1 loss. He finished the season with a career-high three goals and four assists for seven points. At the conclusion of his sophomore season, Rooney was invited to participate in the New York Rangers Development Camp as a free agent.

Upon returning to Providence following the Rangers Development Camp, Rooney and the Friars went 4–5–1 through their first 10 games of the 2014–15 season. In his junior season, Rooney developed into a shutdown forward role while alternating between third- or fourth-line center. His advanced role in the Friars lineup allowed him to tally a career-high seven goals and eight assists for 15 points to help the Friars qualify for the 2015 NCAA tournament. As a result of their lacklustre start to the season, the Friars only qualified for the 2015 NCAA tournament after Minnesota beat Michigan in the Big Ten Championship. During the Frozen Four, Rooney assisted on a goal in Providence's 4–1 win over Omaha to help them advance to their first National Championships since 1985. Rooney and the Friars then faced off against Jack Eichel and the Boston University Terriers in the National Championship. Rooney helped the Friars neutralize the Terrier's top line to lead the Friars to their first National Championship Title in program history. At the Friars end of season banquet, Rooney received the team's Unsung Hero Award. He was also named to Hockey East's All-Academic Team for achieving a GPA of 3.0 or better.

Rooney returned to the Friars as team co-captains alongside Tom Parisi for the 2015–16 season. In this role, he recorded four goals and six assists for 10 points through 38 games.

=== New Jersey Devils organization ===
On March 29, 2016, Rooney concluded his senior year at Providence by signing an amateur try-out agreement with the Albany Devils of the American Hockey League (AHL). While he was offered contracts with other teams, Rooney said he chose the Devils because it was a well-established organization. He played in the final seven regular season games for the Devils, collecting three assists. On July 5, Rooney opted to continue with the Albany Devils and signed a one-year contract extension.

Rooney started the 2016–17 season, his first full season with the Devils, strong by tallying five goals over 19 games. By February 2017, Rooney led all Albany skaters and all AHL rookies with 57 games played. He had also collected 10 goals and seven assists for 17 points and 39 penalty minutes. On February 27, Rooney signed a one-year entry-level contract with the Albany Devils parent club, the New Jersey Devils. A few days later, Rooney was called up to New Jersey and made his NHL debut in a 1–0 loss to the Washington Capitals on March 2. Rooney played 9:48 in his NHL debut and recorded one blocked shot, a hit, and was 60% effective in the faceoff circle. He played three games with the Devils before being returned to the AHL for one game on March 7. He was recalled again to the NHL level on March 9 for one game. Upon being returned to the AHL following his fourth game, Rooney was advised to improve on his strength and speed. Rooney finished the regular season in the AHL with 13 goals and eight assists for 21 points and 39 penalty minutes. When the Devils qualified for the 2017 Calder Cup playoffs, he tallied one goal through four contests as the Devils were swept in the first round.

On July 26, 2017, the Devils re-signed Rooney to a one-year, two-way contract worth $650,000 at the NHL level. After participating in the Devils training camp, he was reassigned to the AHL prior to the start of the 2017–18 season. Less than 24 hours later, Rooney was recalled to the NHL as a potential replacement for Travis Zajac and Brian Boyle. He played one preseason game on the Devils fourth line with Jimmy Vesey and Miles Wood before being returned to the Binghamton Devils in the AHL. Rooney tallied nine goals and nine assists through 41 games before earning his first regular season recall on January 24. He played 11:05 minutes of ice time the following night against the Nashville Predators. However, the recall was short-lived and he was sent back down the next day. Rooney finished his second full AHL season with 14 goals and 20 assists for 34 points through 71 games. While the Devils were competing in the 2018 Stanley Cup playoffs, Rooney was one of seven players from Binghamton recalled as support for their first-round series.

On August 13, 2018, Rooney signed a two-year contract extension with the Devils. The first year was a two-way contract, allowing him to move between the AHL and NHL. The second year of the contract was one-way worth $700,000 at the NHL level. While he was originally returned to the AHL to start the 2018–19 season, Rooney was recalled back to the NHL on October 20 and played in four games. Upon rejoining the Binghamton Devils, Rooney was named team captain on November 20, 2018. He remained in Binghamton until January 10 when he was recalled to the NHL level. While in Binghamton, Rooney had played 34 games with one goal and 16 assists. Four days later, Rooney recorded his first career NHL goal in an 8–5 win over the Chicago Blackhawks. Rooney remained with the Devils for the rest of the season, playing in a mostly depth role on the third and fourth lines. He also experienced both goalless droughts and goal-scoring stretches. After experiencing a nine-game goalless drought in March, Rooney recovered and scored four goals and six points over the next nine games. He finished the season with six goals and four assists for 10 points through 41 games.

After participating in the Devils 2019 training camp, Rooney was named to the Devil's opening night roster for the 2019–20 season. Rooney and the Devils struggled at the start of the season despite hopes of improvement with the additions of Jack Hughes and P. K. Subban. As the Devils began the season with an 0–4-2 record, Rooney's place in the Devils lineup was inconsistent due to an early season injury to his hand. He suffered an injury on November 13 and missed seven games before returning to the lineup on November 30. As the Devils continued to struggle to win games, head coach John Hynes and general manager Ray Shero were both fired. At the time of Shero's firing in January, the Devils had maintained a losing 17–21–7 record and were last place in the Metropolitan Division. Following the NHL's All-Star break, the Devils went six games without experiencing a regulation loss. Interim head coach Alain Nasreddine praised the chemistry between Rooney and John Hayden on the fourth line as part of the reason for the team's success. Through the six games, Rooney had tallied four points and was tied for second on the team with a plus +4 rating. When the NHL paused play due to the COVID-19 pandemic, Rooney had skated in a career-high 49 NHL games while tallying posting four goals and five assists.

=== New York Rangers ===
After four seasons within the Devils organization, Rooney left as a free agent to sign a two-year, $1.5 million contract with the New York Rangers on October 9, 2020.

Rooney began the 2021–22 season strong by recording his first career multi-goal game on November 24, 2021, against the New York Islanders to add his fourth and fifth goals of the season. He quickly followed this up with another multi-point game on December 7 to rank third on the Rangers with six goals. However, this would prove to be his last point of the month as he did not add to his point total until January 8 against the Anaheim Ducks when he recorded two assists. He continued to remain goalless until February 24 when he recorded his seventh goal of the season against the Washington Capitals. Although he had broken his previous drought, Rooney did not tally another point again until April 27 again against the Capitals. Part of this reason was because after playing in his 200th career NHL game on March 2 against the St. Louis Blues, Rooney was placed on injured reserve and listed as 'week-to-week'. He missed 15 games before returning to the Rangers lineup on April 9 and helped them clinch a spot in the 2022 Stanley Cup playoffs. When the Rangers faced off against the Pittsburgh Penguins in the first round of the Stanley Cup playoffs, Rooney was one of nine Rangers players to make their postseason debut in Game 1. During this series, Rooney tallied his first two career postseason assists as the Rangers beat the Penguins in seven games.

=== Calgary Flames ===
On July 13, 2022, Rooney left the Rangers as a free agent and signed a two-year $2.6 million contract with the Calgary Flames. After playing in 17 games for the Flames and recording one point, Rooney was reassigned to their AHL affiliate, the Calgary Wranglers. Rooney made an immediate impact with the Wranglers once joining the team, scoring an assist in his season debut against the San Diego Gulls. He later scored his first goal with the Wranglers during teammate Brett Sutter's 1,000th AHL game on December 21. Rooney remained with the Wranglers for the rest of the 2022–23 season and finished with five goals and 12 assists for 17 points through 51 games. His efforts also helped the Wranglers win the Kilpatrick Trophy as the AHL's regular season champions. Throughout most of the regular season ansd the playoffs, Rooney often played on a veteran line with Brett Sutter and Clark Bishop. During the 2023 offseason, Rooney underwent shoulder surgery and was expected to be out long-term.

On March 8, 2024, Rooney signed a one-year, $1.3 million contract extension with the Flames.

=== Utah Mammoth ===
On October 6, 2025, Rooney signed a one-year, two way contract with the Utah Mammoth.

At the completion of his contract with the Mammoth, Rooney opted to remain within the orgnazation, signing as a free agent to a one-year AHL contract with affiliate, the Tucson Roadrunners, on July 2, 2026.

== Career statistics ==
=== Regular season and playoffs ===
			Regular season					Playoffs
Season	Team	League	GP	G	A	Pts	PIM	GP	G	A	Pts	PIM
2008–09	Canton High School	HSMA	—	—	—	—	—	—	—	—	—	—
2009–10	Canton High School	HSMA	—	35	20	55	—	—	—	—	—	—
2010–11	Berkshire School	HS-Prep	25	12	14	26	8	—	—	—	—	—
2011–12	Berkshire School	HS-Prep	30	14	12	26	10	—	—	—	—	—
2012–13	Providence College	HE	29	1	3	4	18	—	—	—	—	—
2013–14	Providence College	HE	36	3	4	7	20	—	—	—	—	—
2014–15	Providence College	HE	41	7	8	15	12	—	—	—	—	—
2015–16	Providence College	HE	38	6	4	10	20	—	—	—	—	—
2015–16	Albany Devils	AHL	7	0	3	3	0	—	—	—	—	—
2016–17	Albany Devils	AHL	71	13	8	21	39	4	1	0	1	2
2016–17	New Jersey Devils	NHL	4	0	0	0	4	—	—	—	—	—
2017–18	Binghamton Devils	AHL	71	14	20	34	63	—	—	—	—	—
2017–18	New Jersey Devils	NHL	1	0	0	0	0	—	—	—	—	—
2018–19	Binghamton Devils	AHL	38	1	16	17	26	—	—	—	—	—
2018–19	New Jersey Devils	NHL	41	6	4	10	15	—	—	—	—	—
2019–20	New Jersey Devils	NHL	49	4	5	9	20	—	—	—	—	—
2020–21	New York Rangers	NHL	54	8	6	14	54	—	—	—	—	—
2021–22	New York Rangers	NHL	61	6	6	12	18	15	0	2	2	10
2022–23	Calgary Flames	NHL	17	0	1	1	7	—	—	—	—	—
2022–23	Calgary Wranglers	AHL	51	5	12	17	28	9	0	3	3	6
2023–24	Calgary Wranglers	AHL	4	1	0	1	0	—	—	—	—	—
2023–24	Calgary Flames	NHL	33	3	1	4	2	—	—	—	—	—
2024–25	Calgary Flames	NHL	70	5	5	10	14	—	—	—	—	—
2025–26	Tucson Roadrunners	AHL	44	12	12	24	8	—	—	—	—	—
2025–26	Utah Mammoth	NHL	1	1	0	1	0	—	—	—	—	—
NHL totals			331	33	28	61	134	15	0	2	2	10

Medal record

Representing United States

Ice hockey

World Championships
Bronze medal – third place	2021 Latvia	

=== International ===
Year	Team	Event	Result	GP	G	A	Pts	PIM
2021	United States	WC	3rd place, bronze medalist(s)	10	0	1	1	6
Senior totals				10	0	1	1	6
