= Murder of Sandra Birchmore =

2021 murder of American woman in Canton, Massachusetts

- Date: February 1, 2021; 5 years ago
- Location: Canton, Massachusetts, U.S.
- Type: Homicide by strangulation
- Motive: Attempt to conceal evidence of relationship and child sexual abuse
- Deaths: Sandra Birchmore
- Convicted: Officer Matthew Farwell
- Charges: Killing a witness or victim, Protection of unborn children

On February 4, 2021, 23-year-old woman Sandra Birchmore (May 13, 1997 – February 1, 2021) was found dead in her Canton, Massachusetts, apartment. Her death was initially ruled as a suicide by asphyxia. Federal authorities later determined that her death was a homicide, with a local police officer alleged to have killed her. On November 10th, 2026 the officer, Matthew Farwell, was convicted of killing her and her unborn baby to cover up statutory rape starting when she was 15.

Birchmore's murder has drawn parallels to the death of John O'Keefe, another high-profile investigation in Norfolk County. Both cases involve allegations of law enforcement misconduct and have raised questions about the integrity of local authorities.

== Background ==
Birchmore was born and raised in Stoughton, Massachusetts, by a chronically ill single mother. At age 12, Birchmore enrolled in the Stoughton Police Explorers program for youths interested in law enforcement careers. There, she met 25-year-old officer Matthew Farwell, who began grooming her and spending time with her outside of the program. In 2013, when Birchmore was 15 and Farwell was 27, federal prosecutors allege he raped her for the first time; although Farwell married his wife just one month later, his abuse of Birchmore would continue for nearly a decade, including while he was on duty. In 2016, Birchmore's mother died of a stroke. In December 2020, Birchmore learned that she was pregnant, believing that Farwell was the father. In June 2025, a posthumous paternity test revealed that Farwell had not been the father of Birchmore's unborn child.

At the time of her death, Birchmore lived in Canton and worked as a teacher's assistant at an elementary school in Sharon, and had begun taking nursing courses at Massasoit Community College.

== Investigation ==
On February 4, 2021, Birchmore's colleagues at Sharon Public Schools alerted the police after she missed days of work. Police found her body in her apartment that day. First responders believed she had been dead for days. Surveillance videos from February 1 show Birchmore walking in and out of the apartment in the afternoon and Farwell walking into the building in the evening and leaving after about 30 minutes. When she was discovered, she was wearing the same clothes she wore on February 1.

In 2022, Norfolk County District Attorney Michael Morrissey's Office released a statement saying the investigation "found no evidence of foul play" in Birchmore's death. Her death was initially ruled as a suicide by asphyxia.

Birchmore's family questioned the official ruling, saying she was not suicidal at the time of her death. They filed a wrongful death lawsuit naming Matthew Farwell, his twin brother William Farwell, and their supervisor Robert Devine. They believe all three men were involved in sexually assaulting her when she was in the explorer program, and accused the Town of Stoughton and its Police Department of negligent hiring and supervision, which caused Birchmore emotional distress.

In 2024, a federal investigation determined that her death was a homicide, alleging that Matthew Farwell strangled her to death and staged it as a suicide to cover up their relationship and her pregnancy. Farwell was federally indicted on charges of murder in August 2024, with a subsequent superseding indictment in October 2025 adding a charge for causing the death of an unborn child. Federal prosecutors under instruction of then-U.S. attorney general Pam Bondi chose not to seek the death penalty, leaving, if charged, the mandatory sentence for first-degree murder of life without parole.

On December 18, 2025, Robert Devine was decertified by the police oversight board, prohibiting him from serving as a police officer in Massachusetts. Birchmore was found to have enrolled in the Stoughton Police Explorers program at the age of 13, which Devine supervised. He groomed Birchmore and the two engaged in a sexual encounter ten years later.

== Trial ==
The federal trial commenced on October 9, 2026, before Chief Judge Denise J. Casper in the U.S. District Court in Boston. Over nearly four weeks of proceedings, jurors heard from 50 witnesses, and Farwell chose not to testify before the defense rested its case on November 4, 2026. Closing arguments took place on November 6, 2026. On November 10, 2026, after initially reporting that they were deadlocked, the jury found Farwell guilty on both counts.

== In popular media ==
Dateline NBC aired an episode about the case on September 19, 2025.
