= Jonathan Hausman =

American Conservative rabbi (born 1957)

- Born: June 19, 1957 (age 67)
- Education: George Washington University (BA, MA); Emory University (JD)
- Occupation: Rabbi

Jonathan H. Hausman (born June 19, 1957) is an American Conservative rabbi.

He is the rabbi of Congregation Ahavath Torah in Stoughton, Massachusetts.

Hausman grew up in the Bridgeport, Connecticut area. He holds a BA in Judaic Studies, and an MA in International Affairs focusing on the Middle East, from the George Washington University, and a JD from Emory University in addition to Rabbinic ordination from Tifereth Israel Rabbinical Yeshiva. He used to be the rabbi of Congregation Sinai of West Haven, Connecticut.

Hausman is the model for the title character in author Jacob Appel's first mystery novel, Wedding Wipeout: A Rabbi Kappelmacher Mystery, in which Kappelmacher solves murders though "rabbinic reasoning."
