= Martin Badoian =

Martin J. Badoian (August 23, 1928 – October 27, 2018) was a teacher of mathematics at Canton High School in Canton, Massachusetts, who taught for 60 years at the school. Badoian was a co-founder and vice-president of the American Regions Mathematics League.

Badoian attended Brown University, graduating in 1952, where he excelled in athletics. He was a tri-captain athlete at Brown University in golf, basketball, and baseball. He won awards at the state and New England level for his achievements in athletics.

Badoian founded and was the coach of the Canton High math team. He was recognized as the driving force behind their success. The team, from the late 1970s to the late 1990s, had taken 19 of 21 annual New England championships and 14 of 21 state championships. News articles sometimes compared them to the Boston Celtics because of their dominance over other teams. Apart from coaching his high school team, Badoian was the director of New England Math Meet, the New England Mathematics League and the Greater Boston Mathematics League.

== Awards ==
- Massachusetts Teacher of the Year Award 1977
- Edyth May Sliffe Award 1989 and 1991
- Two-time winner of The Alfred Kalfus Founder's Award in 1987 and 1990 (Award for dedication to ARML)
- Presidential Award for Excellence in Mathematics and Science Teaching (State & National Winner)
- Tandy Scholar (National Winner)
