= Ruth G. Capen =

American chemist

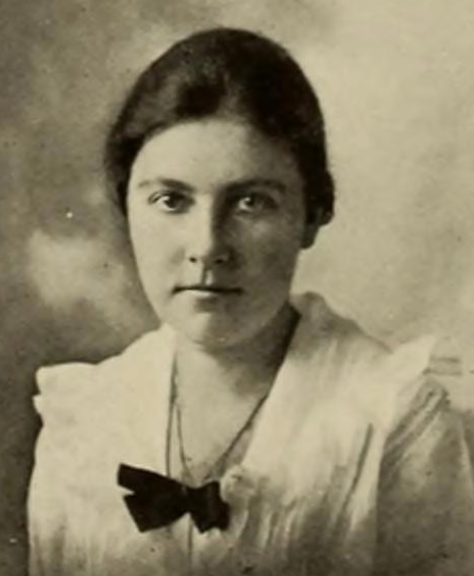
- Ruth G. Capen, from the 1918 yearbook of Smith College
- Born: May 7, 1893; Stoughton, Massachusetts
- Died: June 15, 1974 (aged 81); Winter Park, Florida
- Occupation: Chemist

Ruth Goldthwaite Capen (May 7, 1893 – June 15, 1974) was an American chemist, employed in the United States Department of Agriculture.

== Early life and education ==
Capen was born in Stoughton, Massachusetts, the daughter of Frank Irving Capen and Anna Louise Goldthwaite Capen. Her father was a civil engineer and town official. She graduated from Smith College in 1918.

Other notable members of the extended Capen family from Stoughton include Elmer Hewitt Capen, president of Tufts University, and missionary Fannie Bishop Capen.

== Career ==
Capen was an analytical chemist in the pharmacognosy and soil laboratories of the Bureau of Agricultural and Industrial Chemistry, part of the United States Department of Agriculture, based in Washington, D.C. Much of her research involved studying the nutritional content of food crops. In 1932 she traveled with Emma A. Winslow, director of social statistics at the Children's Bureau.

In 1943, the year her father died, she moved to Winter Park, Florida, where her mother also lived part-time. She was active in Smith alumnae activities in Florida.

== Selected publications ==
- "A New Source of Santonin" (1922, with Arno Viehoever)
- "Domestic Sources of Cantharidin" (1923, with Arno Viehoever)
- "Mineral Constituents of Spanish-Moss and Ballmoss" (1928, with Edgar T. Wherry)
- "The Determination of Manganese in Plant Materials by the Periodate Method" (1929, with Jehiel Davidson)
- "Colorimetric Methods for the Determination of Manganese in Plant Materials" (1931, with Jehiel Davidson)
- "Chemical Composition of Native Alaskan Hays Harvested at Different Periods of Growth" (1933, with J. A. LeClerc)
- "Report on Crude Fiber in Alimentary Paste, Bread, and Baked Products" (1933)
- "The composition and characteristics of soybeans, soybean flour, and soybean bread" (1935, with L. H. Bailey and J. A. LeClerc)
- "Wild Rice and Its Chemical Composition" (1948, with J. A. LeClerc)

== Personal life ==
Ruth Capen died in Florida in 1974, aged 81 years. With increasing interest in alternative grains, Capen's articles, especially her 1948 paper on wild rice, continue to be cited as early studies in that literature.
