= Ryan LaCasse =

American football player (born 1983)

No. 99
- Position: Linebacker

Personal information
- Born: February 6, 1983 (age 43); Stoughton, Massachusetts, U.S.
- Listed height: 6 ft 2 in (1.88 m)
- Listed weight: 257 lb (117 kg)

Career information
- High school: Stoughton
- College: Syracuse
- NFL draft: 2006: 7th round, 219th overall pick

Career history
- Baltimore Ravens (2006)*; Indianapolis Colts (2006)
- * Offseason or practice squad member only

Awards and highlights
- Super Bowl champion (XLI)

Career NFL statistics
- Tackles: 10
- Stats at Pro Football Reference

Ryan J. LaCasse (born February 6, 1983) is an American former professional football player who was a linebacker for the Indianapolis Colts of the National Football League (NFL). He played college football for the Syracuse Orange and was selected by the Baltimore Ravens in the seventh round of the 2006 NFL draft, but was traded to the Colts. He played for the Colts, primarily as a special teams player, on their Super Bowl XLI championship team.

== Early life ==
He started playing football in high school at Stoughton High School in Stoughton, Massachusetts.

== College career ==
LaCasse started 15 of 46 career contests…ranked 10th in school history with 16.5 career sacks (93 yards)…had 118 tackles, 73 solo, 23.5 tackles for losses, 17 pressures, eight FR, one FF, one interception and two passes defensed…as senior was on Super Sleeper Team by the 2006 NFL Draft Report…earned first-team All-Big East honors…started eleven games at RDE…topped club and ranked sixth in conference with nine sacks…had 12 tackles for losses, the 10th-highest seasonal total in school history…had three FF, seven pressures, one pass defensed and one interception…had career-high three sacks and three tackles for losses against Buffalo…played in 12 games as junior at DE and on special teams…had 32 tackles, 22 solo, five sacks, seven tackles for losses, six pressures and four FF…played in every game as sophomore, seeing main action on special teams…had 15 tackles, seven solo, one pressure and one pass defensed…played in eleven games after redshirt freshman season…started four games at rush-end against North Carolina, Rhode Island, Auburn and Pittsburgh…had 19 tackles, 14 solo, 2.5 sacks, 4.5 tackles for losses, three pressures, one FR and one FF…had four tackles, one sack and one FF in first career start against North Carolina.

LaCasse wore #94 as a member of the Orange.

== Professional career ==
Pre-draft measurables
Height	Weight	Arm length	Hand span	40-yard dash	10-yard split	20-yard split	20-yard shuttle	Three-cone drill	Vertical jump	Broad jump	Bench press
6 ft 2 3/8 in (1.89 m)	257 lb (117 kg)	31 1/2 in (0.80 m)	8 1/2 in (0.22 m)	4.57 s	1.60 s	2.64 s	4.28 s	7.01 s	34.0 in (0.86 m)	9 ft 11 in (3.02 m)	34 reps
All values from NFL Combine/Pro Day

When the Colts won Super Bowl XLI, Lacasse was one of five Syracuse Orange alums who earned rings. The others were DE Dwight Freeney, WR Marvin Harrison, RB James Mungro (although he was on the injured list), and DT Josh Thomas.

He is currently a graduate assistant coach for the Syracuse football team.
