= Steve Rooney =

American ice hockey player (born 1963)

- Born: June 28, 1963 (age 61); Canton, Massachusetts, U.S.
- Height: 6 ft 2 in (188 cm)
- Weight: 201 lb (91 kg; 14 st 5 lb)
- Position: Left wing
- Shot: Left
- Played for: Montreal Canadiens; Winnipeg Jets; New Jersey Devils
- NHL draft: 88th overall, 1981; Montreal Canadiens
- Playing career: 1985–1992

Steven Paul Rooney (born June 28, 1963) is an American former professional ice hockey forward. Rooney played his high school hockey for the Canton High School Bulldogs, graduating in 1981. Rooney started his National Hockey League career with the Montreal Canadiens in 1985. He played with the Winnipeg Jets and New Jersey Devils. He went on to win one Stanley Cup with Montreal in 1986. His nephew Kevin is also an NHL player, currently playing for the Calgary Flames.

== Career statistics ==
=== Regular season and playoffs ===
			Regular season					Playoffs
Season	Team	League	GP	G	A	Pts	PIM	GP	G	A	Pts	PIM
1976–77	Canton High School	HS-MA	—	—	—	—	—	—	—	—	—	—
1977–78	Canton High School	HS-MA	—	—	—	—	—	—	—	—	—	—
1978–79	Canton High School	HS-MA	—	—	—	—	—	—	—	—	—	—
1979–80	Canton High School	HS-MA	—	—	—	—	—	—	—	—	—	—
1980–81	Wexford Raiders	OPJAHL	36	13	20	33	58	—	—	—	—	—
1981–82	Providence College	ECAC	31	7	10	17	41	—	—	—	—	—
1982–83	Providence College	ECAC	42	10	20	30	31	—	—	—	—	—
1983–84	Providence College	ECAC	33	11	16	27	46	—	—	—	—	—
1984–85	Providence College	ECAC	42	28	21	49	63	—	—	—	—	—
1984–85	Montreal Canadiens	NHL	3	1	0	1	7	11	2	2	4	19
1985–86	Montreal Canadiens	NHL	38	2	3	5	114	1	0	0	0	0
1986–87	Sherbrooke Canadiens	AHL	22	4	11	15	66	—	—	—	—	—
1986–87	Montreal Canadiens	NHL	2	0	0	0	22	—	—	—	—	—
1986–87	Winnipeg Jets	NHL	30	2	3	5	57	8	0	0	0	34
1987–88	Winnipeg Jets	NHL	56	7	6	13	217	5	1	0	1	33
1988–89	New Jersey Devils	NHL	25	3	1	4	79	—	—	—	—	—
1989–90	Utica Devils	AHL	57	9	16	25	134	5	0	1	1	19
1990–91	New Haven Nighthawks	AHL	44	14	17	31	141	—	—	—	—	—
1990–91	Phoenix Roadrunners	IHL	11	2	5	7	76	—	—	—	—	—
1991–92	Maine Mariners	AHL	13	2	3	5	17	—	—	—	—	—
NHL totals			154	15	13	28	496	25	3	2	5	86
