= Aidan Kearney (journalist) =

American author, blogger and social activist (born 1981)

- Born: Aidan Timothy Kearney; December 1981 (age 44)
- Other names: Turtleboy; Doctor Turtleboy; Clarence Woods Emerson; Journalism Jesus
- Education: University of Massachusetts Amherst
- Occupations: Activist; author; journalist
- Awards: Worcester Magazine: Best Local Blog (2015, 2016); Worcester Magazine: Best Local News Source (2017, 2018); The Valley Patriot: First Amendment Award (2018)
- Website: tbdailynews.com

Aidan Timothy Kearney (born December 1981) is an American journalist, author, and activist, also known as Turtleboy. Kearney is the senior editor of the website and podcast TB Daily News. He gained notoriety for his coverage of a case regarding the death of John O'Keefe, a Boston Police officer, and the ensuing prosecution of Karen Read, and for organizing protests in support of Read.

== Early career ==
Kearney is the son of a former attorney and Worcester School Committee member Mary Mullaney and Kevin Kearney. He was raised in Worcester, Massachusetts. Kearney attended South High Community School, graduating in 2000. He attended the University of Massachusetts Amherst, where he was a member of the intramural sports teams that won the 2002 Men's Weekend Football Championship and lost the 2003 Men's Flag Football Championship. Kearney coached boys varsity track at Doherty Memorial High School in Worcester, circa 2007, and worked as a history teacher at Shepherd Hill Regional High School in Dudley, Massachusetts, for 11 years, until late 2014.

In 2021, Kearney ran for Wachusett Regional School Committee, but was not elected.

== Writing career ==
As a hobby, Kearney started an online blog called AidanFromWorcester.com, where he posted on a variety of issues. After he resigned from teaching, Kearney started the supposedly anonymous website, Turtleboy Sports, which he eventually turned into a full-time career. Turtleboy is a nickname for the Burnside Fountain in Worcester, which he began using upon the suggestion of a former student.

=== As Turtleboy ===
After founding the online publication Turtleboy Sports, Kearney wrote investigative articles anonymously under the pen name Uncle Turtleboy and Clarence Woods Emerson. He grew the site into a team of contributors who contributed articles anonymously under a variety of pseudonyms. In 2015, his identity was unmasked and he began openly using the Turtleboy alias in his writing. He changed the name of his publication to TB Daily News in 2017.

In 2018, Kearney wrote articles about Facebook and Google, citing online censorship. This prompted him to write and publish a book titled, I Am Turtleboy: A Teacher Turned Blogger Battles Big Tech Censorship, Threats, and Political Correctness to Protect Free Speech and Democracy.

In 2019, the American Civil Liberties Union provided legal defense for Kearney in a case against a Rhode Island judge who ordered the removal of "any and all posts, blogs, and comments" regarding a person who sued him for libel. The case cited a violation of the First Amendment. It was dismissed in September, 2020, on the grounds that the Rhode Island court had no jurisdiction over a Massachusetts company that did not do business in Rhode Island.

=== Investigative reporting ===
==== Massachusetts State Police scandal ====
In 2018, Kearney covered alleged misconduct within the Massachusetts State Police regarding a K-9 trooper's history of drug dealing and money laundering. In the early 2000s, the trooper participated in a large scale marijuana business run by her then-live-in boyfriend. The trooper failed to disclose this criminal activity when applying for the State Police, but was uncovered during a testimony against her former boyfriend. The uncovering of this information led the State Police to implementing new background checks and hiring protocols. Because of her criminal history and subsequent dishonorable discharge from the force, cases she participated in during her tenure were called into question. Three District Attorney cases were thrown out due to her involvement.

Kearney was also cited as the first to break news of a Massachusetts state trooper who faced disciplinary actions for including incriminating details in an arrest report concerning a judge's daughter.

==== Commonwealth vs. Karen Read ====
In April 2023, Kearney began covering the case of Massachusetts resident Karen Read, who was accused of killing her boyfriend John O'Keefe, an officer of the Boston Police Department, by hitting him with her car outside of a home in Canton, Massachusetts, in January 2022. Kearney supported Read's claim that she did not hit O'Keefe and was being framed for his death. Kearney organized protests in Canton in support of Read, including at related pre-trial hearings, where he coined the phrase "Free Karen Read". The case garnered national attention as the result of Kearney's coverage of the case in a series called Canton Coverup and due to an investigation into the prosecution of the case by the office of U.S. Attorney Joshua S. Levy.

On June 18, 2025, Read was found not guilty on the three major charges; the jury did find her guilty of the lesser charge of OUI, for which she received a sentence of one year's probation. Following the outcome of the case, Kearney received praise from Rachael Rollins, former United States Attorney for Massachusetts, in a post on X—"His relentless reporting — in the face of repeatedly being told by law enforcement that he was wrong & there was 'nothing to see here' – cracked this case wide open."

=== Legal issues ===
In December 2023, Kearney was indicted on "eight counts of witness intimidation, three counts of conspiracy to intimidate witnesses, and five counts of picketing a witness" related to the Read case. Initially released on bail, Kearney's bail was revoked after he was accused of assaulting a former girlfriend who had received a summons to appear before a grand jury related to the witness intimidation charges. He spent approximately two months in jail until being released in February 2024, amid new charges of witness intimidation and wiretapping related to the alleged assault of his former girlfriend.

On May 13, 2025, a grand jury in Dedham, Massachusetts, indicted Kearney on two additional counts of witness intimidation, two months after he stopped by a pizza shop owned by two of the trial witnesses and caused disruption. Later in May, a judge dismissed six out of a total of 16 counts of witness intimidation that Kearney had been indicted for.

In June 2025, Kearney was found not guilty of violating a restraining order that had been obtained by his former girlfriend, stemming from an incident in February 2024 when he was covering the Read case at the Norfolk County Courthouse and his former girlfriend went to the courthouse with a friend. In October 2025, the Norfolk County district attorney's office dropped an intimidation charge that had been lodged against Kearney, while noting that "two dockets against Adian [sic] Kearney continue to be prosecuted".

=== Awards and recognition ===
Under the Turtleboy Sports name, Kearney has won four Worcester Magazine Best of Worcester awards, winning Best Local Blog in 2015 and 2016 as well as Best Local News Source in 2017 and 2018. In 2018, Turtleboy was also among five nominees to be selected for The Valley Patriot's First Amendment Award, a designation given to those who have "made a significant difference in holding public officials accountable, fought for transparency in government, and gone above and beyond the call of duty to defend and protect our right of free speech, a free press, freedom of religion, and/or has been a whistle-blower against corruption".

Kearney has been a recurring guest with Howie Carr on The Howie Carr Show. Kearney has also been featured on Court TV to provide commentary on the Karen Read case and Kearney's own felony witness intimidation charges related to the investigation of the case.
