= Stoughton Public Schools =

School district in Massachusetts, US

Stoughton Public School District or Stoughton Public Schools is a school district headquartered in Stoughton, Massachusetts.

== Schools ==
Secondary:

- Stoughton High School
- Dr. Robert G. O'Donnell Middle School

Primary:

- Dawe
- Gibbons
- Hansen
- South
- Wilkins

Preschools:

- Jones Early Childhood Center
