= Roger Lee Hall =

American composer and musicologist (born 1942)

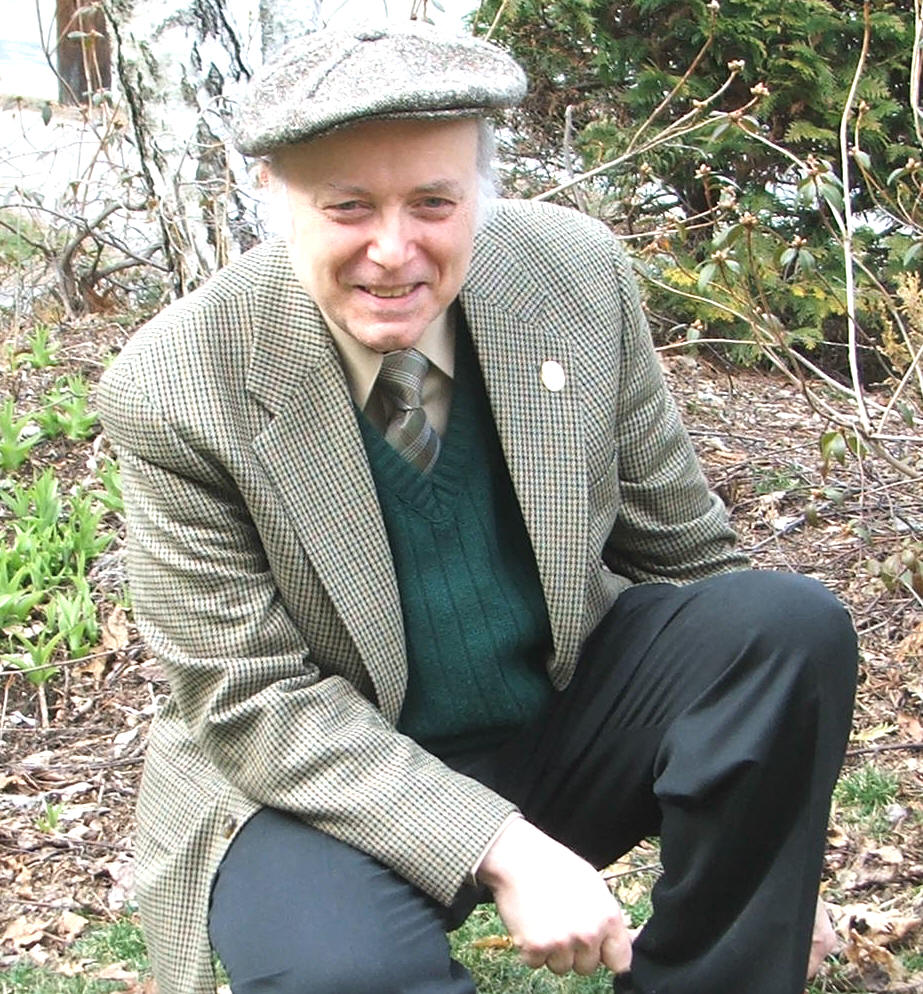
- Born: Glen Ridge, New Jersey
- Education: Binghamton University
- Occupations: Composer, Music Historian
- Years active: 1972–present
- Notable work: "Simple Gifts": Great American Folk Song (2014) "Dedication": Singing in Stoughton (1762-1992) (2017); Variations on a Shaker Marching Tune (1971)
- Website: www.rogerleehall.com

Roger Lee Hall (born 1942) is an American composer and musicologist.

== Personal life ==
Hall was born in Glen Ridge, New Jersey He grew up in Bloomfield, New Jersey and spent several years in the 1950s attending Eastern Military Academy at Oheka Castle, where he had his first music training in the glee club. He graduated from Bloomfield High School in 1960, where he was already involved with writing songs. He began his music career with piano lessons and as a songwriter during the 1960s. Later he turned his attention to studying music in more depth and received his B.A. in music theory and composition from Rutgers University in 1970 and his composition teachers were Robert Nagel and George Walker. His M.A. degree was awarded from Binghamton University in 1972. He also did Ph.D. studies at Case Western Reserve University, where he taught his first class on American popular music, formerly taught by well-known Cleveland disc jockey, Bill Randle. During his early college years, Hall composed his first classical compositions.

== Work ==
In 1977 he moved to Massachusetts and he was a music instructor at Stonehill College and the Brookline Adult and Community Education Program where he taught both classical and popular music courses. He also conducted various church choirs and composed music for them to perform.

Since 1998, he has been involved as a film music critic and the editor of an online magazine, Film Music Review. He is a member of the International Film Music Critics Association. He is the author of "A Guide to Film Music" which has been reprinted in seven editions. In addition, he has been a lecturer and consultant on various topics concerning music of the United States.

As a longtime music preservationist, Hall has helped preserve music of the Shakers and other music from earlier America. He has written over fifty publications in the PineTree Multimedia Editions series, including music guides on Shaker music, Film music, Christmas music in America, George Gershwin, Old-Time Radio, and Old Stoughton Musical Society. In addition, he has written several memoirs about his songwriting years, "Songs of Survival" in 1996 and "Free As The Breeze" in 2015, and he has written autobiographical multi-media books with audio in the series, Memories and Music.

In 1971, he began studying Shaker music and has become an authority on the subject, especially the Shaker song, "Simple Gifts". He compiled and edited numerous Shaker songs and hymns for a series in a national magazine on Shaker culture and has edited and arranged over one hundred Shaker spirituals and published many of them in music collections and on CDs.

During the 1970s and 1980s, Hall was vice-president, Historian and Conductor of the Old Stoughton Musical Society, the oldest choral society in the United States. He has published several monographs and music collections about this choral society, including a monograph about Stoughton composer, Edwin Arthur Jones. With his interest in community music, he has produced and hosted several cable television series. He has been a frequent guest on radio programs and hosted his own radio program, In the Mood, playing music of the 1930s, 1940s, and 1950s.

In 2006, he became the moderator of an extensive site devoted to preservation of American music. He is also Director of the American Music Recordings Collection (AMRC), a large archive of vintage recordings, and Director of the Center for American Preservation (CAMP) which specializes in preserving lesser known music.

Hall has been listed in various directories; including International Who's Who in Music, Who's Who in America and Who's Who in the World.

== Selected music ==
For various ensembles

- Piano Variations,

Op. 1a - on an Original Theme (1968)
Op. 1b - on a Shaker Marching Tune (1971)

- Three Organ Preludes, Op. 5 (1970–1972)
- Tricinium for flute, oboe and bassoon, Op. 6 (1972)
- Six Carols for Christmastime for two recorders, Op. 13 (1983)
- A Little Theatre Music for solo flute, op. 22 (1990)
- Three Shaker Songs for string quartet, Op. 23 (1990)
- Benjamin Franklin's Armonica, Op. 30 (2000)

For solo voice and piano

- six haiku songs, Op. 3 (1970)
- Bellamy's Musical Telephone, Op. 19 (1988)
- Credo: Walt Whitman, Op. 24 (1992)

For unaccompanied chorus

- Two Shaker Humility Songs, Op. 7 (1976): "Gentle Words" and "Love is Little"
- Season's End - Four songs for SATB chorus, Op. 10 (1979)
- The Pleasures of Variety – Homage to William Billings, Op. 11 (1980)
- Two Russian Songs, Op. 18 (1988)
- Two Old Stoughton Songs, Op. 21: "Peace" (1981/ rev. 1990) and "Dedication" (1986)
- Four New England Shaker Spirituals, Op. 40 (2013)

For chorus and piano or organ

- Nine Carols for Advent and Christmas, Op. 9 (1979)
- Three Choral Responses based on themes by J.S. Bach, Op. 15 (1985)
- Four Commemorative Songs, Op. 17 (1989)
- Creator God, We Give You Thanks, Op. 25 (1993)
- Simple Gifts - Shaker Dance Song, Op. 28 (1998)

== Discography ==
- The Humble Heart (2006)
- Gentle Words - A Shaker Music Sampler (2009)
- Celestial Praises - A Celebration of Shaker Spirituals (2013)
- Creator God - Hymns and Spirituals (2015)
- Gentle Peace - A Sampler of Instrumentals and Songs (2015)
- Search Thou My Heart - A Musical Life (2017)
- My Shaker Home (2018)
