= Elisha Capen Monk =

American politician

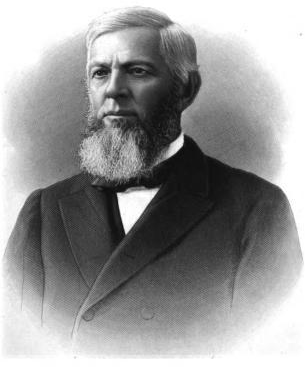

Member of the Massachusetts Senate from the 1st Norfolk district
- In office 1866–1867

Member of the Massachusetts House of Representatives from the Norfolk district
- In office 1856–1857

Personal details
- Born: April 25, 1828 Stoughton, Massachusetts
- Died: January 22, 1898 (aged 69) Stoughton, Massachusetts
- Party: Free Soil, Republican
- Occupation: Shoe manufacturer

Elisha Capen Monk (1828-1898) was an American businessman and politician from Massachusetts. A Republican, in 1856 he was elected to serve in the Massachusetts House of Representatives. From 1866 to 1867 he served in the Massachusetts Senate.

In 1870 Monk went to Colorado where he was one of the founders of the Union Colony of Colorado and Greeley, Colorado.

== Massachusetts ==
Monk's was given a classical education, including work with a private tutor. As a teenager he learned to make boots, and used that skill to earn a good living into adulthood. In 1872 he became the agent of the Stoughton Boot and Shoe company, a significant employer in his home town.

Politically, he was a well-known advocate against alcohol and slavery. His election in 1856 to the Massachusetts legislature was due to his work with the Free-Soil movement. During the Civil War, he recruited soldiers from Stoughton for the Union Army.

== Bibliography ==
- History of Norfolk County, Massachusetts: With Biographical Sketches of Many of Its Pioneers and Prominent Men Vol I. By Duane Hurd pp. 422–424. (1884).
