= Bleach balloon =

Balloons filled with bleach

Bleach balloons, also known as bleach bombs, are water balloons filled with bleach as opposed to water.

== Incidents at the University of Texas ==
In 2012, there were multiple incidents of balloons allegedly filled with bleach thrown at students between the months of June and September at the University of Texas. Four students filed reports with the UT police department, which were followed by protests from students, faculty, and alumni. The students who filed reports came forward once they were contacted by the UT police department. They had heard of the incidents and were concerned as to why the students had not already reported what happened. The students reported that the incidents took place near apartments in West Campus, an area located just off campus. The UT police have not been able to prove that there was in fact bleach in the balloons, but it has been investigated.

The most recent incident occurred on August 21, 2013 to a 21-year-old student by the name of Bryan Davis while walking to a friend's house. He was reportedly struck in the leg by a bleach-filled balloon while walking by an apartment in West Campus. This event was also looked at as being not only physically dangerous, but potentially racially driven. However, upon further investigation and forensic testing, the balloon was confirmed to only have contained water.

== Other occurrences ==
In 2010, a bleach balloon attack was reported in Atlanta, Georgia. It was reported that four high school students threw bleach balloons from a van at a Hispanic, male seventh grader who was walking home from school. The seventh grader, Miguel Mesa, was temporarily blinded upon being struck directly in the face. Two of Mesa's classmates called the police and were able to describe the van's appearance. The driver of the van was identified and arrested, the other three turned themselves in. The suspects told police they were only trying to ruin Mesa's clothing. No information was given or discussed on the possibilities of the attack having racist intentions. Mesa's vision returned after undergoing numerous medical treatments.

Further back, in 2005, another racial attack with the use of bleach was reported in the Netherlands. A 16-year-old girl from Ethiopia was walking with some friends when a 25-year-old male threw bleach on her. As he threw the bleach he yelled, "This will make you whiter". The girl was not seriously hurt, and the man was arrested for assault and hate speech.

== Defense and related incidents ==
The response from the university is that the balloon thrown in August 2013 appears to have been filled with only water, and they sent clothing and pieces of the balloon away for further forensic testing. Authorities claim that they had difficulty verifying that these were racially motivated because there were reports that claim that non-minority students have been hit also but the fact remains that a majority of students targeted have indeed been minority. Sources who were interviewed by the Huffington Post, who wished to be remain anonymous, claimed that as early as 2007, there had been bleach-filled balloons dropped on groups of women participating in sorority rush. They also claimed that bleach-bombing incidents are common and may occur "maybe once or twice a month."

== See also ==
- Acid throwing
