= Edwin Arthur Jones =

American composer (1853–1911)

Edwin Arthur Jones (June 28, 1853 – January 9, 1911) was an American composer. His works include a cantata and a large oratorio in three parts, modeled after Handel's Messiah.

== Early life and education ==
Edwin Arthur Jones was born in Stoughton, Massachusetts, on June 28, 1853. After studies at the New England Conservatory of Music in violin, organ and harmony, Jones entered Dartmouth College in 1872.

That same year, Jones was a violinist among the thousands of instrumentalists and singers who played at the World's Peace Jubilee and International Musical Festival in Boston, organized by bandmaster Patrick Gilmore. One of the special invited guests was the Viennese composer, Johann Strauss Jr., who performed some of his popular waltzes.

Jones graduated from Dartmouth College in 1876, where he was Class President, Director of the Dartmouth Glee Club, First violinist in the Dartmouth College Orchestra, one of the editors of the college newspaper, and Captain of the Dartmouth Big Green baseball team in 1875.

== First compositions ==
After graduation, he went to Baltimore to help his family run a store. His first major composition was a set of waltzes for solo piano, The Farewell Waltzes, which he had composed while at Dartmouth College. This composition was published in Baltimore in 1874. He also made an arrangement for chamber orchestra.

Six years later, in 1880, his First String Quartet was performed at the Peabody Concervatory in Baltimore. He then returned to his home town in Massachusetts.

== Orchestra leader and composer ==
After returning to Stoughton, Jones formed his own orchestra of 20 musicians. A photo of his orchestra was taken in 1885.

In 1881, he composed a large cantata for soloists, chorus, organ and orchestra, Song of Our Saviour. This cantata was never performed during his lifetime and received its world premiere over one hundred years later on May 3, 1992.

The other major choral work by Jones was his oratorio, Easter Concert, for soloists, chorus and orchestra. It was published in 1890 in a piano-vocal score by White-Smith Music Publishing Company in Boston. This version received its first modern day performance on April 26, 1981.

Besides his two large choral works, Jones also composed other vocal works, including:

Blessing and Glory: Fugue - Tenors and Basses (1874); Praise Ye The Lord - Tenors and Basses (1874); Wake, Maiden Wake - Tenors and Basses (1881); King Christian - Bass solo and SATB Chorus (1886); Old Stoughton - SATB Chorus (1886); Ode to Music - SATB Chorus (1888); Love Hailed a Little Maid - Soprano solo and piano (1888); Snowflakes - Soprano solo and piano (1888); Hail, Smiling Morn! - Bass solo and chamber ensemble (undated); Lord, Dismiss Is With Thy Blessing - SATB Chorus (undated).

Among his instrumental works are:

Two String Trios - in D Major and G Major (1878); String Quartet No. 1 in F Major (1880); Dedication March - for orchestra (1881); Suite Ancienne - for orchestra (1886); String Quartet No 2 in G minor (1887) - first performed at Mrs. J. L. (Isabella Stewart) Gardener's home in Boston by the Kneissel Quartet in 1889.

Jones was a member of the two choral societies in town: The Stoughton Musical Society, founded in 1786 and now the oldest choral society in America, and The Musical Society in Stoughton, founded in 1802, disbanded in 1982. He was largely responsible for the Stoughton Musical Society's invitation to perform at the World's Columbian Exposition in Chicago in 1893.
