= Elmer Hewitt Capen =

American politician

3rd President of Tufts College
- In office 1875–1905
- Preceded by: Alonzo Ames Miner
- Succeeded by: Frederick W. Hamilton

Personal details
- Born: April 5, 1838 Stoughton, Massachusetts
- Died: March 22, 1905 (aged 66) Medford, Massachusetts

Elmer Hewitt Capen (April 5, 1838 – March 22, 1905) was the third president of Tufts College (now Tufts University), serving from 1875 to 1905. He was born in Stoughton, Massachusetts. Capen graduated from Tufts in 1860, and while there he was a founding member of the Kappa Charge of Theta Delta Chi. Also, in 1859, while still an undergraduate, he was elected to, and served in, the Massachusetts House of Representatives. He relinquished his seat after one term in order to finish his studies and graduate with his class. After his graduation from Tufts, he studied at Harvard Law School, practiced law for a short time, and then became a Universalist minister.

Capen presided over the continued expansion of course and program offerings at Tufts, and the beginning of co-education (over his own objections) in 1892. He died in office on March 22, 1905. A bronze bust of Capen remains in Tufts' Goddard Chapel. The residence he constructed for himself and his family while president, at 8 Professors Row, is still known as Capen House. His wife was Mary Leavitt Edwards (1860-1944; married to Sumner Robinson following Elmer Capen's death). Elmer and Mary's only son, Samuel Paul Capen (1878-1956) also graduated from Tufts, and made significant contributions to the field of higher education; he became the first Director of the American Council on Education.

== Sources ==
- Elmer Hewitt Capen, 1875 - Tufts Interactive Timeline
