= Stoughton, Massachusetts =

- Town
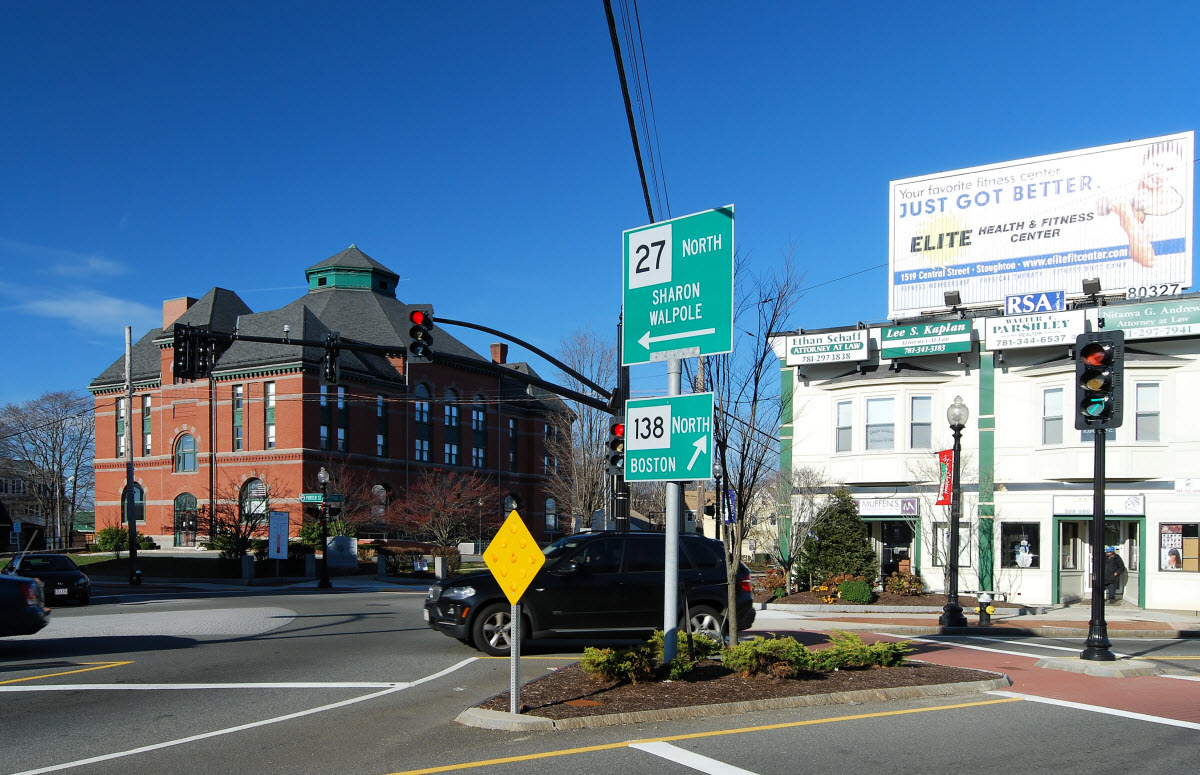
- Town center

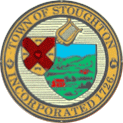
- Seal
- Nickname: "Birthplace of American Liberty"
- Location in Norfolk County in Massachusetts
- Coordinates: 42°7′30″N 71°6′10″W
- Country: United States
- State: Massachusetts
- County: Norfolk
- Settled: 1713
- Incorporated: 1726

Government
  - Type: Representative town meeting
  - Town Manager: Thomas Calter

Area
  - Total: 16.3 sq mi (42.1 km^{2})
  - Land: 16.0 sq mi (41.5 km^{2})
  - Water: 0.23 sq mi (0.6 km^{2})
- Elevation: 236 ft (72 m)
- Highest elevation: 350 ft (110 m)

Population (2020)
  - Total: 26,962
  - Density: 1,827/sq mi (705.6/km^{2})
- Time zone: UTC−5 (Eastern)
  - Summer (DST): UTC−4 (Eastern)
- ZIP Code: 02072
- Area code: 781
- FIPS code: 25-67945
- GNIS feature ID: 0618330
- Website: https://www.stoughton.org/

Stoughton /ˈstoʊtən/ (official name: Town of Stoughton) is a town in Norfolk County, Massachusetts, United States. The population was 29,281 at the 2020 census. The town is located approximately 17 miles (27 km) from Boston, 31 miles (50 km) from Providence, Rhode Island, and 35 miles (56 km) from Cape Cod.

== History ==
Stoughton was settled in 1713, and officially incorporated in 1726 from the southwestern portion of the large town of Dorchester. At its founding, it included the current towns of Sharon (which separated in 1765), Canton (which separated in 1797) and Avon (which separated in 1888). It was named after William Stoughton, who was the first chief justice of the Colonial Courts, and the most relentless and recalcitrant judge during Salem Witch Trials, who refused to acknowledge the trials were anything but successful and was infuriated when they were ended by Governor Phips.

The Suffolk Resolves were written in Old Stoughton (current day Milton, Massachusetts) at Doty's Tavern. The meeting included the Rev. Samuel Dunbar and Paul Revere; the site was chosen by Samuel Adams and Dr. Joseph Warren.

Originally an agricultural community, Stoughton developed into an important shoemaking center. In 1874, the Stoughton Public Library was established.

The oldest choral society in the United States is located in Stoughton. Founded in 1786 as The Stoughton Musical Society, it is now known as the Old Stoughton Musical Society. It has the oldest constitution of any musical society in the United States, written in 1787, only a few weeks after the United States Constitution. In 1893, this musical society distinguished itself by performing several concerts at the World's Columbian Exposition in Chicago, heard by an audience of several thousand people. In 1986, the musical society celebrated its bicentennial with a series of concerts and special events.

The "Save Our Stoughton" campaign attracted national attention in the 1980s for their work picketing a local adult book store. Most recently, Stoughton became the first municipality in Massachusetts to declare itself a "No Place for Hate" town.

Stoughton's train station was built in 1888, and is the only one in Massachusetts to house a clock tower. The station is unique in another way as it was built out of stones from a West Street quarry that belonged to Stoughton resident Myron Gilbert. In 1974, it was listed on the National Register of Historic Places. Over one million dollars was raised to restore the station to its original luster in time for the 100th anniversary. In 2009, however, the MBTA permanently closed the station, which stood at the terminus of the Stoughton Branch of the MBTA's Providence/Stoughton Line. The building still stood but remained closed to the public as of 2015. In 2015, members of Town Meeting voted to purchase the train station from the state. Stoughton's train station was used as a filming location in the movie Little Women. In the film’s final scene, the station appears as the train depot for Concord, Massachusetts. At the time of production, the station’s interior remained largely unchanged from its original 19th‑century design, making it an appropriate and historically accurate setting for the period depicted. Plans for use of the property are being developed by the Community Preservation Committee.

On May 9, 2013, a weak, brief, and unexpected tornado touched down in Stoughton, with minor damage occurring. The tornado was rated EF0 on the Enhanced Fujita scale after the National Weather Service office in Taunton, Massachusetts confirmed this tornado in a damage survey on May 10. During the 2022 blizzard, Stoughton recorded 30.9 inches of snow, the highest total in Massachusetts. By early morning the following day, large snowbanks—some more than six feet high—were visible throughout the downtown area, and sidewalk conditions varied as cleanup efforts continued.

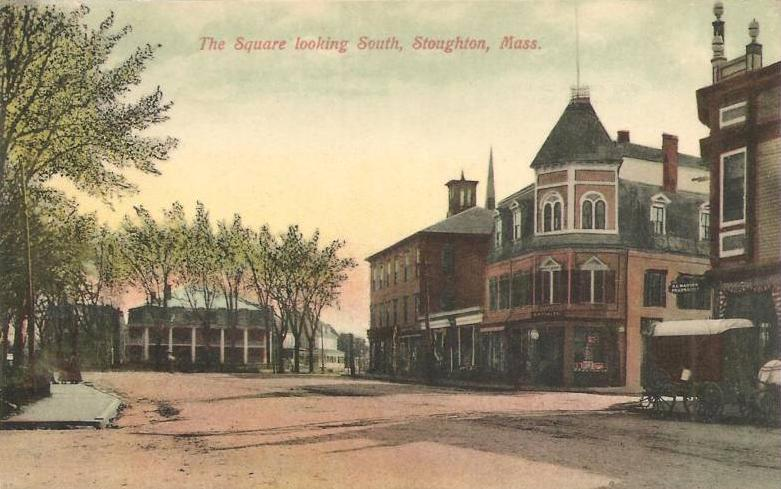
Stoughton Square in 1908

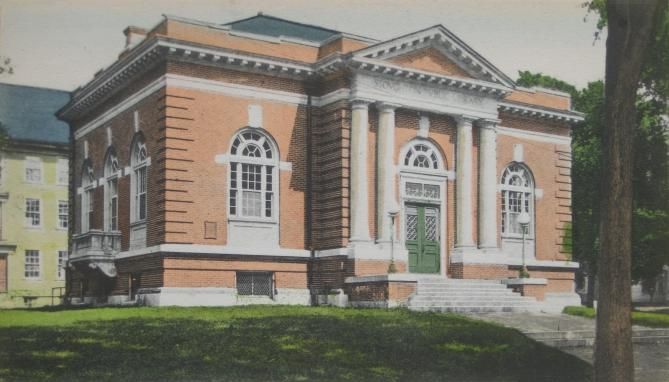
Public library in 1908

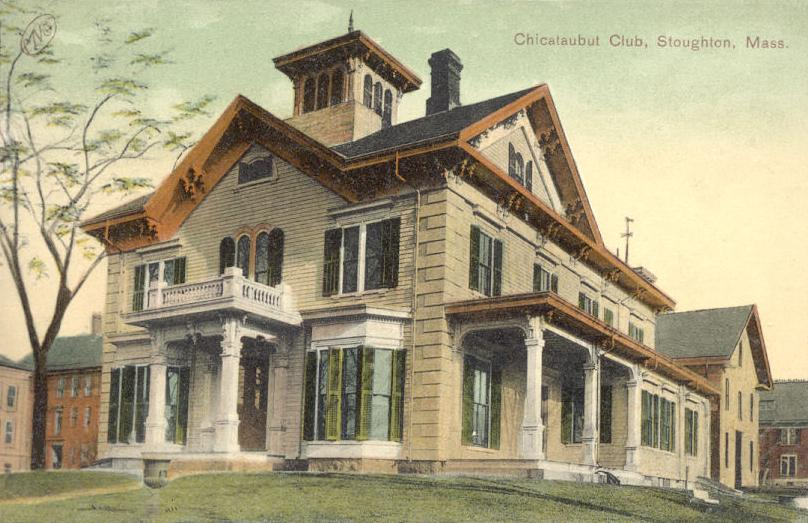
Chicataubut Club in 1911

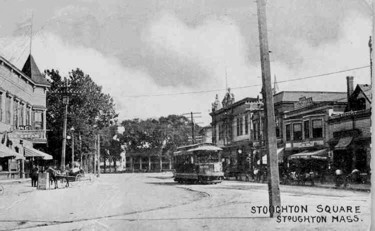
Stoughton Square c. 1912

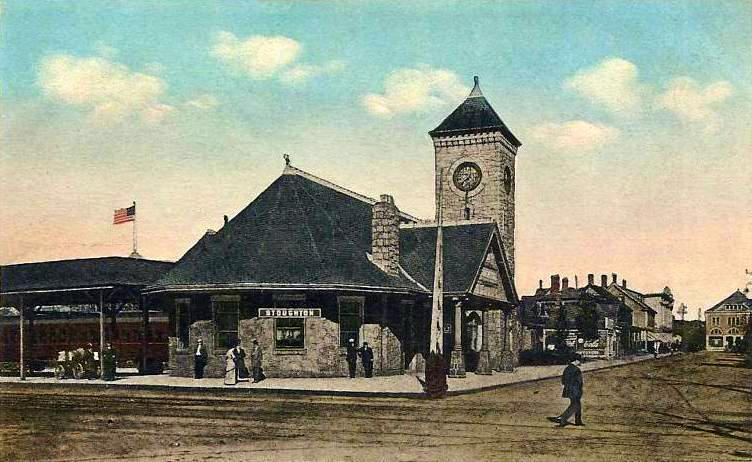
Railway station c. 1918

== Geography ==
According to the United States Census Bureau, the town has a total area of 16.3 square miles (42 km^{2}), of which 16.0 square miles (41 km^{2}) is land and 0.2 square miles (0.52 km^{2}) (2.41%) is water. Stoughton borders Canton to the north, Randolph to the northeast, Avon to the east, Brockton to the southeast, Easton to the south, and Sharon to the west. The highest point in Stoughton, approximately 350 feet (106.7 m) above mean sea level, is an unnamed hill in the southwestern region of town between Ames Pond and Briggs Pond (Easton).

== Demographics ==
Historical population
| Year | Pop. | ±% |
|---|---|---|
| 1790 | 1,994 | — |
| 1850 | 3,494 | +75.2% |
| 1860 | 4,830 | +38.2% |
| 1870 | 4,914 | +1.7% |
| 1880 | 4,875 | −0.8% |
| 1890 | 4,852 | −0.5% |
| 1900 | 5,442 | +12.2% |
| 1910 | 6,316 | +16.1% |
| 1920 | 6,865 | +8.7% |
| 1930 | 8,204 | +19.5% |
| 1940 | 8,632 | +5.2% |
| 1950 | 11,146 | +29.1% |
| 1960 | 16,328 | +46.5% |
| 1970 | 23,459 | +43.7% |
| 1980 | 26,710 | +13.9% |
| 1990 | 26,777 | +0.3% |
| 2000 | 27,149 | +1.4% |
| 2010 | 26,962 | −0.7% |
| 2020 | 29,281 | +8.6% |
| 2024* | 29,457 | +0.6% |
* = Population estimate. Source: United States census records and Population Estimates Program data.

As of the 2010 Census, there were 26,962 people, 10,295 households, and 7,099 families residing in the town. The population density was 1,654.1 inhabitants per square mile (638.7/km^{2}). There were 10,818 housing units at an average density of 663.7 per square mile (256.3/km^{2}). The racial makeup of the town was 80.2% White, 11.1% African American, 0.2% Native American, 2.3% Asian, 1.3% from other races, and 2.6% from two or more races. Hispanic or Latino of any race were 3.2% of the population.

There were 10,295 households, out of which 27.9% had children under the age of 18 living with them; 51.5% were married couples living together; 13.1% had a female householder with no husband present; and 31.0% were non-families. Of all households, 25.6% were made up of individuals, and 2.9% had someone living alone who was 65 years of age or older. The average household size was 2.59 and the average family size was 3.13.

In the town, the population was spread out, with 81.5% of age 16 years and over, 78.7% of age 18 years and over, 75.7% of age 21 years and over, 20.1% of age 62 years and over, and 16.4% of age 65 years and over. The median age was 42.9 years. For every 100 females, there were 92.1 males. For every 100 females aged 18 and over, there were 88.3 males.

Stoughton has a history of manufacturing and an emerging cluster of regional retail, as well as a substantial base of land zoned for commercial and industrial purposes. The major commercial and industrial areas in town are located adjacent to Route 24 and along routes 138, 139, and 27; but smaller areas are interspersed with residential zones due to the community's industrial past. The town has significant protected open space resources, including the Bird Street Sanctuary, water department lands, recreational fields, and a municipal golf course. Additional privately owned, but not protected, undeveloped lands are an important factor in the character of the community. Stoughton has good access to the regional roadway network, being served by several state routes and three interchanges on Route 24. Stoughton also has access to regional transit, being served by bus from Brockton and MBTA Commuter Rail at the station in downtown Stoughton.

== Economy ==
The Total Value of all taxable Real Property was $4,021,541,014 in 2018, an increase of 6% compared to the previous year, due to "improved market values and conditions improved and included growth in construction of new residential, commercial, industrial dwellings and personal property." In the year 2018, property tax accounted for 55% of the town's operating budget.

== Arts and culture ==
An annual 4th of July fireworks display takes place at the high school. Other Stoughton attractions include local drama groups, summer-time outdoor concerts, and annual parades to honor veterans. Every year on the 4th of July, Stoughton has a parade. Stoughton also has an annual parade on Veterans Day. Stoughton also holds a Holiday Parade of Lights in December. The town of Stoughton organizes swimming programs at the Ames Long Pond and provides a public basketball court, barbecue spots and picnic areas at Halloran Park.

== Parks and recreation ==
Several organizations exist in the town for recreation and sports.

The Recreation Department offers a variety of activities throughout the year for both children and adults.

Stoughton High School’s football program was long led by Greg Burke, who became head coach in 1990 after previously serving as a local assistant coach and playing linebacker at Northeastern University. Over his career, Burke recorded a 188–136–4 overall record and guided the team to five South Sectional playoff appearances. Under his leadership, Stoughton earned Hockomock League titles in 2001, 2011, and 2014, including the school’s first outright Davenport Division championship since 1975. In 2019, Burke was inducted into the Massachusetts High School Football Coaches Association Hall of Fame, becoming the second coach in school history to receive the honor.

The Stoughton Youth Athletic Club (STOYAC) offers girls softball, boys and girls basketball, football and cheering.

Stoughton Youth Soccer League (SYSL) offers both in-town and travel soccer programs for spring and fall season in divisions ranging from u5 and u6 (co-ed) to u16 and even u18, when there is sufficient participation. The league is based at the Kolz Soccer Complex on West Street, where the league maintains three fields, a concession stand and bathroom facilities. All in-town and home travel games are played at the Kolz Complex. Practices are held there and at other locations around town. SYSL participates in the South Shore Soccer League for travel soccer programs.

Stoughton Youth Baseball is affiliated with Cal Ripken Baseball and Babe Ruth Baseball. It offers skills programs for 5-year-old children; t-ball and instructional leagues for ages 6 and 7; and divisions for 8- and 9-year-olds, and 10-, 11- and 12-year-olds.

Stoughton Lacrosse offers programs and leagues for both boys and girls in four divisions, u9, u11, u13 and u15.

== Government ==
The Town is governed by a selectmen-manager plan with a representative town meeting. Stoughton's Annual Town Meeting convenes in May, and is chaired by the Town Moderator. The Board of Selectmen of the town consists of five members, all of whom are elected at large for a term of three years. The selectmen appoint a town manager, who is the chief administrative officer in the executive branch of government. The town manager carries out the policies and plans set forth by the selectmen.

== Education ==
Stoughton Public Schools operates public schools. There is one public high school in Stoughton, one public middle school, five elementary schools and several parochial and private schools in nearby towns. The town recently completed the construction of the new high school, which was ready for the 2019–2020 school year. The old high school was demolished, and is where the new athletic fields were placed. Parts of the original High School were used to create a wall at the entrance.

At the joint meeting of the Board of Selectmen, the Stoughton School Committee and the SHS Building Committee on Tuesday November 17, 2015, there was a unanimous vote to endorse the building project by both the Board of Selectmen and the Stoughton School Committee.

The Stoughton High School Building Committee voted on Thursday, November 12, 2015, to recommend to the Massachusetts School Building Authority (MSBA) that the town construct option C2A, to build a new Stoughton High School. The preliminary cost analysis for the total project is estimated to be $126,137,847. The projected state reimbursement is estimated at $54,598,291. The town's protected share of the cost is estimated to be $71,539,557.

== Infrastructure ==
=== Transportation ===
Stoughton is on an MBTA commuter rail line that runs to South Station in Boston via the Providence/Stoughton Line. The Brockton Area Transit Authority (BAT) provides local bus service.

== Notable people ==
- John Bailey, congressman
- Supply Belcher, composer
- Forrest Bird, aviator, inventor and biomedical engineer
- Doris Holmes Blake, entomologist
- Elmer Hewitt Capen, college president
- Fannie Bishop Capen, missionary
- Ruth G. Capen, chemist for the Bureau of Agriculture
- Bill Chamberlain, Major League Baseball player
- Thomas H. Collins, U.S. Coast Guard Commandant
- Mo Cowan, U.S. senator for Massachusetts
- Mary Baker Eddy, religious leader
- Jacob French, composer
- Ed Gill, Major League Baseball player
- Richard Gridley, soldier and army engineer
- Roger Lee Hall, musicologist and composer
- Jonathan Hausman, rabbi of Ahavath Torah Congregation and political activist
- Edwin Arthur Jones, composer
- Kerry Keating, basketball coach
- Ryan LaCasse, football player
- Robert Lanza, medical doctor and researcher
- Ed McGuinness, comic book artist
- Lori McKenna, Grammy-winning singer/songwriter who wrote hits for Little Big Town, Hunter Hayes and Carrie Underwood. McKenna was born in Stoughton to Francis and Lorraine Girox on December 22, 1968
- Shawn Phelan, actor
- Henry L. Pierce, mayor of Boston
- Bertha Reynolds, social worker
- Fred Richard, American artistic gymnast - Stoughton is the hometown of Frederick "Flips" Richard, an accomplished American gymnast who gained national attention as part of the U.S. men's gymnastics team at the Paris Olympics. In recognition of his achievements, the town designated October 6 as Frederick Richard Day, honoring his contributions to the sport and his role in representing Massachusetts on the international stage. Richard returned to Stoughton to celebrate the occasion at Stoughton High School, his alma mater, where he performed for students and encouraged young athletes to pursue gymnastics and other competitive opportunities.
- Niccola Sacco, of Sacco & Vanzetti
- Deborah Sampson, female soldier of the Revolution
- Roger Sherman, statesman
- Jason Tankerley, singer/songwriter of the band Energy
- John F. Thornell Jr., American World War II flying ace
- T.J. Thyne, actor
- Kenny Wormald, dancer, actor, television personality

== See also ==
- Stoughton Police Department - In 2021, Sandra Birchmore, a former member of the Stoughton Police Explorers program, was found dead in her apartment. The state medical examiner ruled the death a suicide. In 2022, an internal investigation by the Stoughton Police Department reported that three officers, including Detective Matthew Farwell, had engaged in inappropriate relationships with Birchmore, with Farwell’s involvement beginning when she was a minor. In 2024, federal prosecutors opened a separate investigation and later charged Farwell with strangling Birchmore and staging the scene to appear as a suicide. The federal findings differed from the initial assessment by Norfolk County investigators, who had previously stated that no foul play was involved.
