= Craniopagus parasiticus =

Rare medical condition

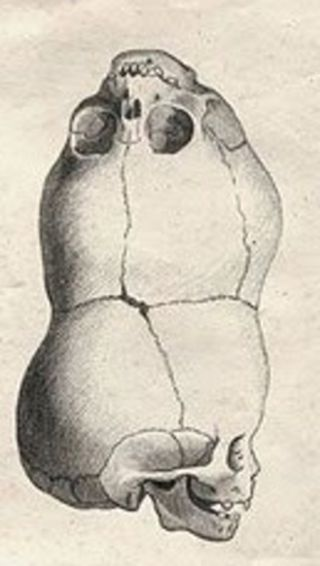
- Drawing of a skull of a child born in 1783 in Bengal, affected by craniopagus parasiticus

Craniopagus parasiticus is an extremely rare type of parasitic twinning occurring in about 4 to 6 of 10,000,000 births. In craniopagus parasiticus, a parasitic twin head with an undeveloped body is attached to the head of a developed twin. Fewer than a dozen cases of this type of conjoined twin have been documented in literature.

== Development ==
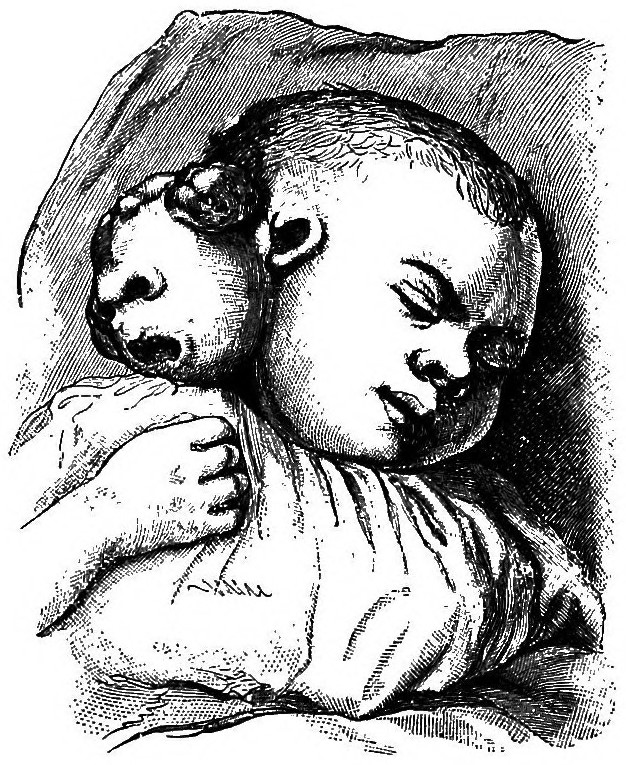
Infant with craniopagus parasiticus ("supernumerary head")

The exact development of craniopagus parasiticus is not well known. However, it is known that the underdeveloped twin is a parasitic twin. Parasitic twins are known to occur in utero when monozygotic twins start to develop as an embryo, but the embryo fails to completely split. When this happens, one embryo will dominate development, while the other's development is severely altered. The key difference between a parasitic twin and conjoined twins is that in parasitic twins, one twin, the parasite, stops development during gestation, whereas the other twin, the autosite, develops completely.

In normal monozygotic twin development, one egg is fertilized by a single sperm. The egg will then completely split into two, normally at the two-cell stage. If the egg splits in the early blastocyst stage, two inner cell masses will be present, eventually leading to the twins sharing the same chorion and placenta, but with separate amnions. However, the egg can split into two, but still have one blastocyst. This will lead to one inner cell mass and one blastocyst. Then, as the twins develop, they will share the same placenta, chorion, and amnion. This is thought to be the most likely reason why conjoined twins occur, and could possibly play a role in the development of craniopagus parasiticus.

One hypothesis is that craniopagus parasiticus starts with the development of two fetuses from a single zygote that fail to separate at the head region around the second week of gestation. Another is that it occurs later in development, around the fourth week of gestation, at which time the two embryos fuse together near the anterior open neuropore.

A third hypothesis is that there is joining of the somatic and placental vascular system of the twins, as well as a degeneration of the umbilical cord of the parasitic twin. This suggests that craniopagus parasiticus develops due to the lack of blood supply to one of the twins.

== Diagnosis ==
=== Related conditions ===
In addition to craniopagus parasiticus, a few other conditions involve a child's, or animal's, birth with two heads or faces.

==== Dicephalic parapagus ====
Dicephalic parapagus is a condition where two heads are side by side on a single torso, with varying degrees of twinning of organs and structures within the torso.

==== Diprosopus ====
Diprosopus occurs when a single body and neck are present, but there is a duplication of the structures of the face. This is different from craniopagus parasiticus in that there is only one head, although there is a duplication of the craniofacial features. Diprosopus can range from having two fully formed faces to just a duplication of the nose or eyes. Cats with the condition are referred to as 'Janus cats'. A cat named Frankenlouie was a famous example noted by the Guinness Book of World Records in 2012 for being the longest surviving Janus cat.

== Treatment ==
Few individuals survive until birth. For those who do, the only treatment available is to surgically remove the parasitic twin. Of the two documented attempts, however, one child died within hours and neither reached their second birthday. The problem with surgical intervention is that the arterial supplies of the head are so intertwined that it is very hard to control the bleeding, but it has been suggested that cutting off the parasitic twin's arterial supply might improve the odds of the developed twin's survival.

== Prevalence ==
There have been at least eighty reported cases of craniopagus parasiticus. Only ten cases of craniopagus have been documented in medical research literature.

== Notable cases ==
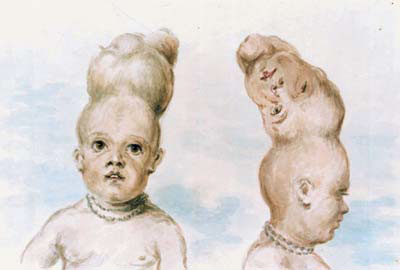
Drawing of the Boy of Bengal, affected by craniopagus parasiticus

Manar Maged, a notable girl from Egypt.

Only four cases have been documented by modern medicine to have survived birth:

- The first case on record is that of the so-called "Two-Headed Boy of Bengal", who was born in 1783 at the village of Mandal Ghat in the New Jalpaiguri district in what is now the Indian state of West Bengal and died of a cobra bite in 1787. His skull remains in the collection of the University of Glasgow Hunterian.
- On December 10, 2003, Rebeca Martínez was born in the Dominican Republic. She was the first baby born with the condition to undergo an operation to remove the second head. She died on February 7, 2004, after an 11-hour operation.
- On March 30, 2004, Manar Maged was born. On February 19, 2005, 10-month-old Manar underwent a successful 13-hour surgery in Egypt. The underdeveloped conjoined twin, Islaam, was attached to Manar's head and was facing upward. Islaam could blink and even smile, but doctors determined she had to be removed, and that she could not survive on her own. Manar was featured on an episode of The Oprah Winfrey Show and in the British documentary series Body Shock. Manar died on March 26, 2006, fourteen months after the surgery, just days before her second birthday, due to a severe infection in her brain.

== Terminology ==
In the past, the use of terminology when describing parasitic twins has been somewhat inconsistent. By definition, a parasitic twin is joined to another twin in a certain anatomical location or position on the developed twin's body. The underdeveloped twin is termed the parasite, and the developed twin is termed the autosite. The autosite can have some abnormalities, as well. For the most part, however, they have developed enough that they can live on their own.

== See also ==
- Pasqual Piñón, a sideshow performer billed as the Two-headed Mexican
- Janus, ancient Roman god depicted with two faces
- Edward Mordake, an urban legend with a similar trait
- Futakuchi-onna, Japanese yōkai with a similar trait
- Tomie Kawakami, the titular character of Junji Ito's Tomie manga series, who displays a similar condition in one of her numerous incarnations
- Malignant, a 2021 film depicting a fictional case of this condition

== Bibliography ==
- Aquino DB, Timmons C, Burns D, Lowichik A (1997). "Craniopagus parasiticus: a case illustrating its relationship to craniopagus conjoined twinning". Pediatr Pathol Lab Med. 17 (6): 939–44. doi:10.1080/107710497174381. PMID 9353833.
- Bondeson J, Allen E (1991). "Everard Home's famous two-headed boy of Bengal and some other cases of craniopagus parasiticus". Surg Neurol. 35 (6): 483. doi:10.1016/0090-3019(91)90185-C. PMID 2053064.
- Bondeson J, Allen E (1989). "Craniopagus parasiticus. Everard Home's Two-Headed Boy of Bengal and some other cases". Surg Neurol. 31 (6): 426–34. doi:10.1016/0090-3019(89)90087-6. PMID 2655135.
- Gilbert-Barness E, Debich-Spicer D, Opitz JM (2003). "Conjoined twins: Morphogenesis of the heart and a review". Am. J. Med. Genet. 120A (4): 568–582. doi:10.1002/ajmg.a.10195. PMID 12884443. S2CID 8278110.
- Nair KR (1990). "Craniopagus parasiticus". Surg Neurol. 33 (2): 159. doi:10.1016/0090-3019(90)90033-L. PMID 2406987.
- Okazaki JR, Wilson JL, Holmes SM, Vandermark LL (1987). "Diprosporus: Diagnosis in utero". American Journal of Roentgenology. 149 (1): 147–148. doi:10.2214/ajr.149.1.147. PMID 3296709.
- Schoenwolf, Gary (2008). Larsen's Human Embryology (4th ed.).
- Sharmaa G, Mobina S, Lypkaa M, Urata (2010). "Heteropagus (parasitic) twins: a review". Pediatric Surgery. 45 (12): 2454–63. doi:10.1016/j.jpedsurg.2010.07.002. PMID 21129567.
- Wang DM, Zhang PL (1985). "头部连胎畸形 报告一例临床所见和副脑的组织学视察" [A case report of craniopagus parasiticus (clinical features and the histological study of the accessory brain)]. 中华整形烧伤外科杂志 [Chinese Journal of Plastic Surgery and Burns] (in Chinese). 1 (1): 31–33. doi:10.3760/cma.j.issn.1000-7806.1985.01.110 (inactive 11 July 2025). OCLC 114804808. PMID 3939788.
- Wang TM, Li BQ, Li-Che, Fu CL (1982). "Craniopagus parasiticus: a case report of a parasitic head protruding from the right side of the face". Br J Plast Surg. 35 (3): 304–11. doi:10.1016/0007-1226(82)90119-9. PMID 7150854.
