= Edward Mordake =

British urban legend

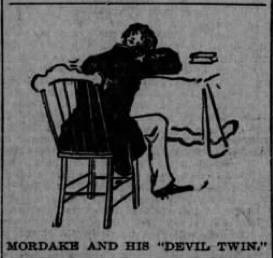
Illustration of Mordake in the Boston Sunday Post, December 8, 1895

Edward Mordake (sometimes spelled Mordrake) is the apocryphal subject of an urban legend who was born in the 19th century as the heir to an English peerage with a face at the back of his head. According to legend, the face could whisper, laugh or cry. Mordake repeatedly begged doctors to remove it, claiming it whispered bad things to him at night. Mordake died by suicide at the age of 23.

== Description ==
An account described Mordake's figure as one with "remarkable grace" and with a face similar to that of an Antinous. The second face on the back of Mordake's head — supposedly female — reportedly had a pair of eyes and a mouth that drooled. The duplicate face could not see, eat, or speak, but was said to "sneer while Mordake was happy" and "smile while Mordake was weeping". According to legend, Mordake repeatedly begged doctors to have his "demon face" removed, claiming that at night it whispered things that "one would only speak about in Hell", but no doctor would attempt it. This then led to Mordake secluding himself in a room before deciding to take his own life at the age of 23.

An account of Mordake's story was detailed in Anomalies and Curiosities of Medicine:

One of the weirdest, as well as the most melancholy stories of human deformity, is that of Edward Mordake, said to have been heir to one of the noblest peerages in England. He never claimed the title, however, and committed suicide in his twenty-second year. He lived his life in complete seclusion, refusing the visits even of the members of his own family. He was a young man of fine attainments, a profound scholar, and a musician of rare ability. His figure was remarkable for its grace, and his face — that is to say, his natural face — was that of an Antinous. But upon the back of his head was another face, that of a beautiful girl, "lovely as a dream, hideous as a devil." The female face was a mere mask, "occupying only a small portion of the posterior part of the skull, yet exhibiting every sign of intelligence, of a malignant sort, however." It would be seen to smile and sneer while Mordake was weeping. The eyes would follow the movements of the spectator, and the lips "would gibber without ceasing." No voice was audible, but Mordake avers that he was kept from his rest at night by the hateful whispers of his "devil twin", as he called it, "which never sleeps, but talks to me forever of such things as they only speak of in Hell. No imagination can conceive the dreadful temptations it sets before me. For some unforgiven wickedness of my forefathers, I am knit to this fiend — for a fiend it surely is. I beg and beseech you to crush it out of human semblance, even if I die for it." Such were the words of the hapless Mordake to Manvers and Treadwell, his physicians. In spite of careful watching, he managed to procure poison, whereof he died, leaving a letter requesting that the "demon face" might be destroyed before his burial, "lest it continues its dreadful whisperings in my grave." At his own request, he was interred in a waste place, without stone or legend to mark his grave.

== Earliest reference ==
The first known description of Mordake is found in an 1895 article in The Boston Post authored by fiction writer Charles Lotin Hildreth. The article describes a number of cases of what Hildreth refers to as "human freaks", including a woman who had fish-tails for legs, a man with crab-claws for legs and forearms, a man with the body of a spider, a limbless 'melon child', a man with four eyes, and Edward Mordake. Hildreth claimed to have found these cases described in old reports of the "Royal Scientific Society". According to a 2021 article in USA Today, the only known "Royal Scientific Society" was founded in 1970 by Jordanian monarchs. Nothing could be found in the records of the similarly named Royal Society of London. Like many publications of the time, Hildreth's article was not factual, and was likely published by the newspaper to increase reader interest.

== Anomalies and Curiosities of Medicine ==
The 1896 medical encyclopedia Anomalies and Curiosities of Medicine, co-authored by Dr. George M. Gould and Dr. David L. Pyle, included an account of Mordake. The account was copied directly from Hildreth's article, and was credited only to a "lay source". The encyclopedia described the basic morphology of Mordake's condition, but it provided no medical diagnosis for the rare deformity. An explanation for the birth defect may have been a form of craniopagus parasiticus (a parasitic twin head with an undeveloped body), a form of diprosopus (bifurcated craniofacial duplication), or an extreme form of parasitic twin (an unequal conjoined twin).

== In popular culture ==
Poor Edward is a song by Tom Waits, which retells the story but changes the poisoning to hanging.

In the webcomic Monster Pulse, by Magnolia Porter, there is a character named Edward with a detached, monstrous face, loosely inspired by the Tom Waits song.

== See also ==
- Craniopagus parasiticus
- Diprosopus
- Futakuchi-onna
- Janus
- Polycephaly
- Pasqual Piñón
- Harry Potter and the Philosopher's Stone
- Malignant (2021 film)
