= Urban university =

University serving an urban community

An urban university (which in some cases may be referred to as an urban-grant university or metropolitan university) is a U.S. term for an institution of higher learning that is socially involved and serves as a resource for educating the citizens and improving the health of the city or region in which it is located. That is, the urban university must be “of” the city as well as “in” the city. A metropolitan university includes a similar mission; however, its research has national and international implications and its student body includes a significant number of international students. Many institutions have further defined what urban and metropolitan universities encompass.

== Definitions ==
=== Urban Universities ===
The Committee on Urban Programs defines an urban university as having "a campus located in a major urban area and a substantial number of commuter students. It provides a broad range of undergraduate, professional, and graduate programs, and makes all levels of higher education more accessible to students living in the urban community. Through urban-oriented education, research, and service strategies, an urban university manifests a deep sense of responsibility to its urban constituencies and attempts to assist them in coping with their problems."

=== Metropolitan Universities ===
In 1995, P.E. Mulhollan authored the study, "Aligning Missions with Public Expectations: The Case of the Metropolitan Universities" for the book titled Metropolitan Universities: An Emerging Model in American Higher Education and defined a metropolitan university, in its simplest terms, "[as] an institution that accepts all of higher education's traditional values in teaching, research, and professional service, but takes upon itself the additional responsibility of providing leadership to its metropolitan region by using its human and financial resources to improve the region's quality of life."

Furthermore, metropolitan universities like Arizona State University, Ohio State University, University of North Carolina at Charlotte and Florida International University also focus on national as well as global initiatives and issues regarding global sustainability. Through institutes such as the Ohio State University Health Sciences Center for Global Health and the ASU School of Sustainability's Global Institute of Sustainability, research initiatives addressing regional issues are utilized to answer questions on a national and global scale. This is accomplished by sharing technology and innovation with international organizations, research institutes, and serving as models for other research universities.

== Criteria ==
At one time the term urban university might be used only to describe institutions located in central cities. This is no longer the case as urban sprawl and the advent of edge cities has not so much made urban obsolete as to change conventional notions of what constitutes urban. Today an urban or metropolitan university is one located in an urban agglomeration irrespective of political boundaries (state lines) or administrative definitions.

An urban or metropolitan university operates with a closely meshed and intertwined mission, milieu, and environment. An operational definition of the urban or metropolitan university would incorporate both its setting and the constituency it serves. The Coalition of Urban and Metropolitan Universities and the Coalition of Urban Serving Universities provide several criteria applying to such institutions in the United States:

1. Location in a major metropolitan area with populations of more than 450,000
2. Dedication to achieving excellence through teaching, research, and public service
3. A diverse student body reflecting the demographic composition of the region
4. Responsiveness and service to the local region as part of the university's mission while striving for national excellence
5. Serves the region not only by providing an educated citizenry and workforce, but also as a cultural and intellectual resource
6. Engages in partnerships with other local organizations
7. Uses practical experience in the urban setting to enhance students' education

More than six dozen universities in the United States would qualify as urban or metropolitan universities under these criteria; however, most land-grant universities are not traditionally considered urban or metropolitan. Indiana University-Purdue University Indianapolis, George Washington University, New York University, Syracuse University, University of California at Los Angeles, Rutgers University, University of Minnesota, Portland State University, University of Louisville, Temple University, University of Washington and University of Nebraska Omaha are examples of well-known urban and metropolitan universities.

The term urban university is sometimes used to refer to public institutions with large part-time and commuter student bodies. Such usage sometimes tacitly assumes relatively low academic standards as implicit in the student body's low income and part-time, commuter status. Clearly, such criteria are not necessary to the definition of an urban university and may reflect subtle racism and classism that tacitly equates certain groups with lower academic abilities and achievement. Insofar as this is true, urban universities have been criticized for contributing to institutional racism.

== History ==
The history of university-community relations in 20th century America was characterized by periods of optimism and innovative action followed by disillusionment. During the years when cities were rapidly growing as a result of immigration and migration from the countryside, academics contributed to the search for solutions to urban problems and played a major role in the Progressive movement. After World War I, research became increasingly esoteric, its focus shifting to national and international issues, until, with the 1960s, efforts to find accommodations with a restive local community spawned a wide variety of new programs. The advent of new technology appeared to satisfy needs for both research and jobs, but it also produced new frictions. In the present decade, new models for university-community partnerships and cooperation have evolved and civic engagement has been linked more closely with the educational mission of the urban and metropolitan university.

== See also ==
- Wisconsin Idea
