= Alpha Psi =

Medical and pharmaceutical fraternity

- ΑΨ
- Founded: January 18, 1907; 119 years ago Ohio State University College of Veterinary Medicine
- Type: Professional and Social
- Affiliation: Independent
- Status: Active
- Emphasis: Veterinary
- Scope: National
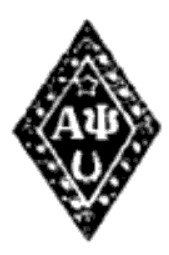
- Member badge
- Colors: Dark blue and Bright gold
- Flower: Red carnation
- Publication: Alpha Psi Quarterly
- Chapters: 8 active
- Headquarters: United States

Alpha Psi (ΑΨ) is an American social and professional Veterinary Medicine fraternity. It was founded at the Ohio State University College of Veterinary Medicine in 1907.

== History ==
Founded by 22 juniors and seniors in veterinary medicine at the Ohio State University, Alpha Psi was established on January 18, 1907. Its purpose was both social and professional.

From its beginnings, the fraternity was planned to spread throughout the United States and Canada. The fraternity gradually spread to other colleges of veterinary medicine when students formed chapters at many veterinary schools in the United States. By 1915, it had fifteen chapters.

As of 2024, it had eleven active chapters. Its membership is open to both men and women.

Delta chapter and Gamma chapter became inactive when their host schools closed.

== Symbols ==
The colors of Alpha Psi are dark blue and bright gold. Its flower is the red carnation. Its publication is Alpha Psi Quarterly.

== Chapters ==
Following are the chapters of Alpha Psi. Active chapters are indicated in bold. Inactive chapters are in italic.

Chapter	Charter date and range	Institution	City	Location	Ref.
**Alpha**	1907	Ohio State University College of Veterinary Medicine	Columbus, Ohio	Active	
Beta	1907–1999	Cornell University College of Veterinary Medicine	Ithaca, New York	Inactive	
Gamma	1907–1920	Chicago Veterinary College	Chicago, Illinois	Inactive	(Note: Chapter went domant when Chicago Veterinary College closed.)
Delta	1907–1918	Kansas City Veterinary College	Kansas City, Missouri	Inactive	(Note: Chapter went dormant with the closure of the Kansas City Veterinary College.)
**Epsilon**	1908	University of Pennsylvania School of Veterinary Medicine	Philadelphia, Pennsylvania	Active	
Zeta	1910–19xx ?	Colorado State University College of Veterinary Medicine and Biomedical Sciences	Fort Collins, Colorado	Inactive	
Eta	1912–19xx ?	Kansas State University College of Veterinary Medicine	Manhattan, Kansas	Inactive	
**Theta**	1912	Auburn University	Auburn, Alabama	Active	
Iota	1915–19xx ?	Michigan State University College of Veterinary Medicine	East Lansing, Michigan	Inactive	
Kappa	1915–19xx ?	Washington State University College of Veterinary Medicine	Pullman, Washington	Inactive	
**Lambda**	1949	University of Georgia College of Veterinary Medicine	Athens, Georgia	Active	
**Mu**	1954	Oklahoma State University–Stillwater	Stillwater, Oklahoma	Active	
**Nu**	1956	University of Minnesota	Saint Paul, Minnesota	Active	
**Xi**	1979	University of Florida College of Veterinary Medicine	Gainesville, Florida	Active	
**Omicron**	1981	Tufts University Cummings School of Veterinary Medicine	North Grafton, Massachusetts	Active	
**Pi**	1983	Virginia–Maryland College of Veterinary Medicine	Blacksburg, Virginia	Active	
**Rho**	1988	Mississippi State University College of Veterinary Medicine	Starkville, Mississippi	Active	
**Sigma**	1992	University of Tennessee College of Veterinary Medicine	Knoxville, Tennessee	Active	
