= Cummings School of Veterinary Medicine =

School of veterinary medicine in Massachusetts, US

Coordinates: 42.247009°N 71.680319°W

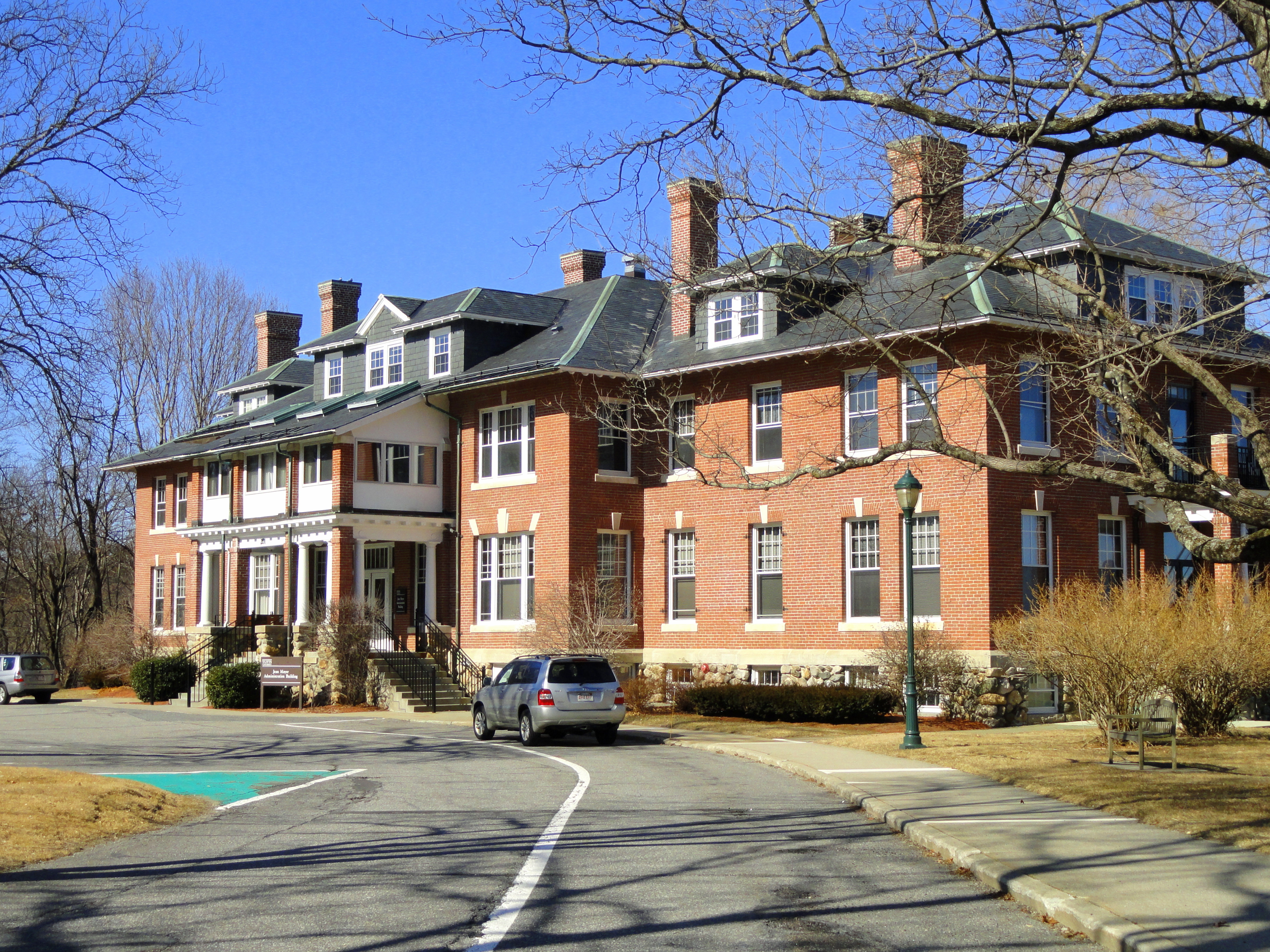
- Jean Mayer Administration Building, Cummings School campus (2012)
- Type: Private
- Established: 1978; 48 years ago
- Affiliations: Tufts University; HECCMA
- Dean: Alastair Cribb
- Location: North Grafton, Massachusetts, United States
- Campus: Suburban
- Website: vet.tufts.edu

The Cummings School of Veterinary Medicine of Tufts University is a graduate school of veterinary medicine located in North Grafton, Massachusetts. The Cummings School is the only college of veterinary medicine in New England. The school is also part of the Higher Education Consortium of Central Massachusetts.

== History ==
Established in 1978 under the leadership of Tufts President Jean Mayer, the Cummings School was the first school of veterinary medicine in New England since the closure of Middlesex University in Waltham in 1947. The school is supervised by a dean, appointed by the university president and the provost, with the approval of the trustees. The dean is responsible for all aspects of operating the school, including admissions, education, faculty appointments, partnerships, and affiliated research institutions. Appointed in July 2019, Alastair Cribb is the current dean of the school, as well as the Henry and Lois Foster Professor of Biomedical Sciences.

Since 1981, the school has run the Omicron chapter of the Alpha Psi professional veterinary medicine fraternity.

In 2005, the school was named in honor of Bill Cummings and his wife, Joyce, who are founders of the Cummings Foundation, after a fifty-million dollar commitment was made. Bill graduated from Tufts in 1958 with a Bachelor of Arts in economics. Another major donor to the school was Agnes Varis.

In 2015, along with the generosity of the Cummings family, the school was an early partner to help establish the University of Global Health Equity.

Notably, the Cummings School was a primary care provider for Frank and Louie, known as the world's oldest diprosopus cat.

== Program ==
The Cummings School offers both Master of Science and doctorate degrees, or a dual combination, in fields related to veterinary medicine. Stand-alone master’s degrees include study in Animals and Public Policy and Conservation Medicine. Doctoral degrees include Doctor of Veterinary Medicine (DVM) and a Doctor of Philosophy (PhD) in Biomedical Sciences. The DVM degree can also be paired with other courses of study at Tufts' Fletcher School of Law and Diplomacy, Graduate School of Biomedical Sciences, or the School of Medicine.

== Notable faculty ==
- Robyn Alders (professor)
- Franklin M. Loew (dean)

== Notable alumni ==
- Lexie Laing (MS APP 2020), professional ice hockey player

== See also ==
- List of schools of veterinary medicine
