= Pascal Pinon =

Pascal Pinon may refer to:

- Pasqual Piñón (1889–1929), known as The Two-Headed Mexican
- Pascal Pinon (band), an Icelandic band
