= Charles Mills (Massachusetts artist) =

American artist (1856–1956)

Charles Mills (1856–1956) was an American artist.

== Biography ==
Charles Mills was born in 1856 in Pittsburgh, Pennsylvania. He attended Allegheny College for one year before moving to Europe at the age of 22. There he studied under Frank Duveneck. His most famous works include a series of murals at the Benjamin Franklin Institute of Technology, the Suter Window at Trinity Church, and the stained glass windows at Memorial Hall at Harvard University.

He moved to Dedham, Massachusetts, in 1888.

== Works ==
Murals at the Benjamin Franklin Institute of Technology
