= Robyn Alders =

Veterinary scientist

- Born: Taralga
- Education: Taralga Public School; Crookwell High School; University of Sydney; Australian National University
- Awards: Order of Australia
- Scientific career
- Fields: food security, Influenza A virus subtype H5N1
- Institutions: University of Zambia, Cummings School of Veterinary Medicine, University of Sydney
- Patrons: Australian Centre for International Agricultural Research
- Thesis: Immunobiology of utero-ovarian peripheral lymph in sheep (1989)

Robyn Gwen Alders AO is the first female veterinary scientist to be made an Officer of the Order of Australia. Dr. Alders is most recognised for her work on food security by improvements in poultry health in developing countries. Alders' work on the maintenance of the health of small poultry flocks helps under-resourced women to provide adequate nutritional and financial support for their families.

== Early life and education ==
Robyn Alders was born and raised on a farm in Taralga, New South Wales. Educated locally at Taralga Public School, then Crookwell High School, she was the first in her family to matriculate from high school. During high school, Robyn was an American Field Service Scholar, spending 12 months in Concordia, Kansas. Encouraged by the educational reforms enacted by Prime Minister Gough Whitlam that provided free tertiary education, Alders embarked upon a Bachelor of Veterinary Science degree at the University of Sydney.

Following her graduation as a veterinarian from the University of Sydney, Alders undertook an internship in large animal medicine receiving a Diploma of Veterinary Clinical Studies. She then moved to the John Curtin School of Medicine at the Australian National University where she completed her PhD researching the immunology of pregnancy.

== Veterinary work in the developing world ==
While living at Wesley College in the University of Sydney, Alders became associated with Community Aid Abroad. This association led her to seek a position in a developing country upon the completion of her PhD. Dr. Alders was employed as lecturer for three years at the newly founded School of Veterinary Medicine at the University of Zambia. She then spent three years working as Project Officer in Southern Africa for Community Aid Abroad, spending much of her time contributing to the renewal of small-scale agricultural production at the end of the civil war in Mozambique.

Poultry are not only by far the most common type of livestock owned, they are often the only livestock owned by the most vulnerable families. Poultry play an important role on smallholder farms, because they:

- are a relatively low-cost way to access quality food
- provide eggs and meat that can be sold or traded easily for other essential family items
- assist with pest control
- provide manure for fertiliser.

Poultry are often the only livestock under the control of women. Ensuring the participation of women in the ND control activities has empowered them and improved the wellbeing of their families.

— Robyn Alders (2012)

Village chickens represent a low input source of nutrition and income, usually under the care of women, in underdeveloped countries. Indigenous poultry breeds are largely self-sufficient. Their natural scavenging and roosting behaviours allow them to be maintained with a low initial investment and minimal inputs for food or housing. Under conditions of good health, they reproduce rapidly providing an excellent source of high-quality nutrition through eggs and meat, or may provide income from the sale of these products. Maintenance of the health of small poultry flocks may represent the only opportunity for under-resourced women to provide adequate nutritional and financial support for their family.

During her time in Southern Africa Dr. Alders became aware of the importance of village chickens in the lives of people in undeveloped communities. It was apparent that viral Newcastle disease (ND) was endemic and causing significant mortality and loss of production in these small flocks. The development of a thermotolerant vaccine for ND meant that for the first time, control of this important livestock disease was possible in the most remote and underdeveloped regions. Together with Professor Spradbrow, Dr. Alders received funding from the Australian Centre for International Agricultural Research (ACIAR) to implement a program of vaccine delivery in the field in Mozambique. Similar ND vaccine programs have now been used throughout Africa and Southeast Asia.

Dr. Alders' main contributions to these programs has been in developing sustainable, user-pays systems delivered by local people. This has been achieved by using vaccine technology suitable for local environmental and supply chain conditions; culturally sensitive and effective education programs; and co-ordination with relevant international government bodies along with national stakeholders.

Since 2004, Alders has been also involved with highly pathogenic avian influenza control and preparedness in Ethiopia, Indonesia, Kenya, Laos, Malawi, Mozambique, Tanzania, Thailand, Timor-Leste and Vietnam. In Indonesia, she oversaw the training and communication components of the FAO HPAI Participatory Disease Surveillance and Response Program from May 2007 to September 2009. From May 2008 to June 2011, Robyn directed the International Veterinary Medicine Program at Tufts Cummings School of Veterinary Medicine in the US and remains an Adjunct Associate Professor with this program. From July 2011 to May 2012, Alders was the Team Leader of a Newcastle disease control project in Angola implemented by the KYEEMA Foundation and funded by the European Union.

=== Current projects ===
- Principal Research Fellow Charles Perkins Centre, University of Sydney ACIAR – Strengthening food and nutrition security through family poultry and crop integration in Tanzania and Zambia
- Australian Department of Agriculture and Department of Foreign Affairs and Trade (DFAT) – Timor Leste Village Poultry Health and Biosecurity Program
- Australia Africa Universities Network – Building an AAUN coalition to support improved nutrition and health of children under five years, pregnant and lactating mothers
- Kyeema Foundation – Supporting food security and capacity building in African Union member states through the sustainable control of Newcastle disease in village chickens.

== Awards and honours ==
- 2002 The Kesteven Medal, awarded by the Australian Veterinary Association and the Australian College of Veterinary Scientists in recognition of distinguished contributions to international veterinary science in the field of technical and scientific assistance to developing countries
- 2006 The Belle Bruce Reid Medal, awarded by the University of Melbourne to outstanding women Veterinary Scientists
- 2011 First female Veterinary Science graduate Officer of the Order of Australia. Citation: "For distinguished service to veterinary science as a researcher and educator, to the maintenance of food security in developing countries through livestock management and disease control programs, and to the Australian poultry industry"
- 2011 The University of Sydney 2011 Alumni Award for International Achievement
- 2012 The Wesley College Foundation Medal
- 2014 The Crawford Fund medal for extensive work & impact in international agricultural research in Asia & Africa

In 2012 360 degrees films made a documentary about Dr. Alders' work in Africa.

== Publications ==
- Controlling Newcastle Disease in Village Chickens: A Training Manual, 2002; 2nd Edition, 2003.
- Success story on the control of Newcastle disease in village chickens using thermotolerant vaccines, 2003.
- Poultry for profit and pleasure. Diversification Booklet No. 3, 2004.
