= Futakuchi-onna =

Japanese yōkai

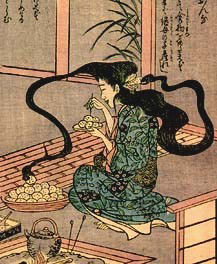
An image of futakuchi-onna from the Ehon Hyaku Monogatari

Futakuchi-onna (ふたくちおんな - 二口女; "two-mouthed woman") is a type of yōkai or Japanese monster. She is characterized by her two mouths – a normal one located on her face and a second one on the back of the head beneath the hair. There, the woman's skull splits apart, forming lips, teeth and a tongue, creating an entirely functional second mouth.

In Japanese mythology and folklore, futakuchi-onna belongs to the same class of stories as rokurokubi, kuchisake-onna and yama-uba, women afflicted with a curse or supernatural disease that transforms them into yōkai. The supernatural nature of the women in these stories is usually concealed until the last minute, when the true self is revealed.

== Origins of the second mouth ==
The origin of futakuchi-onna's second mouth is often linked to how little a woman eats. In many stories, the soon-to-be futakuchi-onna is a wife of a miser and rarely eats.

To counteract this, a second mouth mysteriously appears on the back of the woman's head. The second mouth often mumbles spiteful and threatening things to the woman and demands food. If it is not fed, it can screech obscenely and cause the woman tremendous pain. Eventually, the woman's hair begins to move like a pair of serpents, allowing the mouth to help itself to the woman's meals.

While no food passes through her normal lips, the mouth in the back of her head consumes twice than the other one would. In another story, the extra mouth is formed when a stingy woman was accidentally hit in the head by her husband's axe while he was chopping wood, and the wound never heals. Other stories have the woman as a mother who lets her stepchild die of starvation while keeping her own offspring well fed; presumably, the spirit of the neglected child lodges itself in the stepmother's or the surviving daughter's body to exact revenge.

== Prototypical story ==
This is the most famous and prototypical story of the futakuchi-onna:

In a small village there lived a stingy miser who, because he could not bear the expense of paying for food for a wife, lived entirely by himself.

One day he met a woman who was full of beauty; with every villager admiring her looks. Although she did not eat anything, the miser immediately took the woman as his wife. Because she never ate a thing, and was still a hard worker, the old miser was extraordinarily thrilled with her, but on the other hand he began to wonder why his storage of rice was steadily decreasing.

One day the man pretended to leave for work, but instead stayed behind to spy on his new wife. To his horror, he saw his wife's hair part on the back of her head, her skull split wide open revealing a gaping mouth. She unbound her hair, which reached out like tentacles to grab the rice and shove it into the hungry mouth. He immediately ran away in fear, after a moment of horror about his wife having a mouth in the back of her head.

== See also ==
- Craniopagus parasiticus and Diprosopus – scientific explanation
- Edward Mordrake
- Obake
- Shigeru Mizuki
- Tomie Kawakami
