= Benjamin Franklin Cummings Institute of Technology =

Private college in Boston, Massachusetts

- Type: Private college
- Established: 1908; 118 years ago
- Accreditation: NECHE
- Endowment: ~$4 million
- President and CEO: Aisha Francis
- Undergraduates: 500
- Location: Boston, Massachusetts, United States; 42.3457°N 71.0702°W
- Campus: 0.7 acres (0.28 ha); Urban
- Website: franklincummings.edu

Benjamin Franklin Cummings Institute of Technology (Franklin Cummings Tech, formerly Benjamin Franklin Institute of Technology) is a private college in Boston, Massachusetts. It focuses on technology and trades programs and was established in 1908 with funds bequeathed in Benjamin Franklin's will.

== History ==
Benjamin Franklin Cummings Institute of Technology owes its existence to the vision of Benjamin Franklin. In a codicil to his will, dated 1789, Franklin established a 200-year plan for £1,000 (about $4,400 at the time, or about $112,000 in 2010 dollars) that he gave to the city of Boston, where he was born. For the first hundred years, the money was to serve as principal for loans to young workmen; at the end of that period, the fund's managers would divide the money, using approximately three-fourths for public works and maintaining the rest as a loan fund.

When the hundred-year interval had passed, Boston decided to use the money to establish a technical school. Aided by an additional gift from industrialist Andrew Carnegie and land donated by the city, the institute opened its doors in 1908. A series of murals on campus were painted by Charles Mills.

In 2019, the institute announced plans to sell its three-building 1908 campus and construct a new, purpose-built facility. In September 2019, the institute announced a move to a new campus located on seven-tenths of an acre at 1011 Harrison Ave. in the Nubian Square section of Roxbury to be closer to the neighborhoods where many of its students lived.

In September 2020, the Boston Globe leaked that the institute was planning for a possible merger with the Wentworth Institute of Technology. The merger deal faced opposition among community members and city officials based on how the merger would affect Benjamin Franklin's ability to continue to serve low-income minority students, as well as the secretive nature of the merger negotiations themselves. In November 2020, the college's board of trustees voted to keep Benjamin Franklin Institute of Technology independent and to discontinue any merger talks.

In February 2022, the college announced it received a $12.5 million gift from the Cummings Foundation to advance its work in creating technical career pathways for students typically underrepresented in post-secondary education. In recognition of the transformational nature of the commitment—nearly equivalent to the school's annual operating budget—the college was renamed Benjamin Franklin Cummings Institute of Technology.

The current South End campus was closed as of December 24, 2025. The new 85,000 square feet (7,900 m^{2}) building opened in January 2026.

== Academics ==
As of 2025, the college served 1,125 students (55% in traditional programs; 16% in continuing education and workforce programs; and 29% in early college programs), and offered programs of study awarding certificates, associate degrees, and bachelor's degrees. The college boasts a 3-year graduation rate of 57%, compared to a 21% average for 2-year MA colleges.

The college is accredited by the New England Commission of Higher Education (NECHE).
