= Trinity Church (Boston) =

Historic church in Boston, Massachusetts

- U.S. National Register of Historic Places
- U.S. National Historic Landmark
- U.S. Historic district – Contributing property
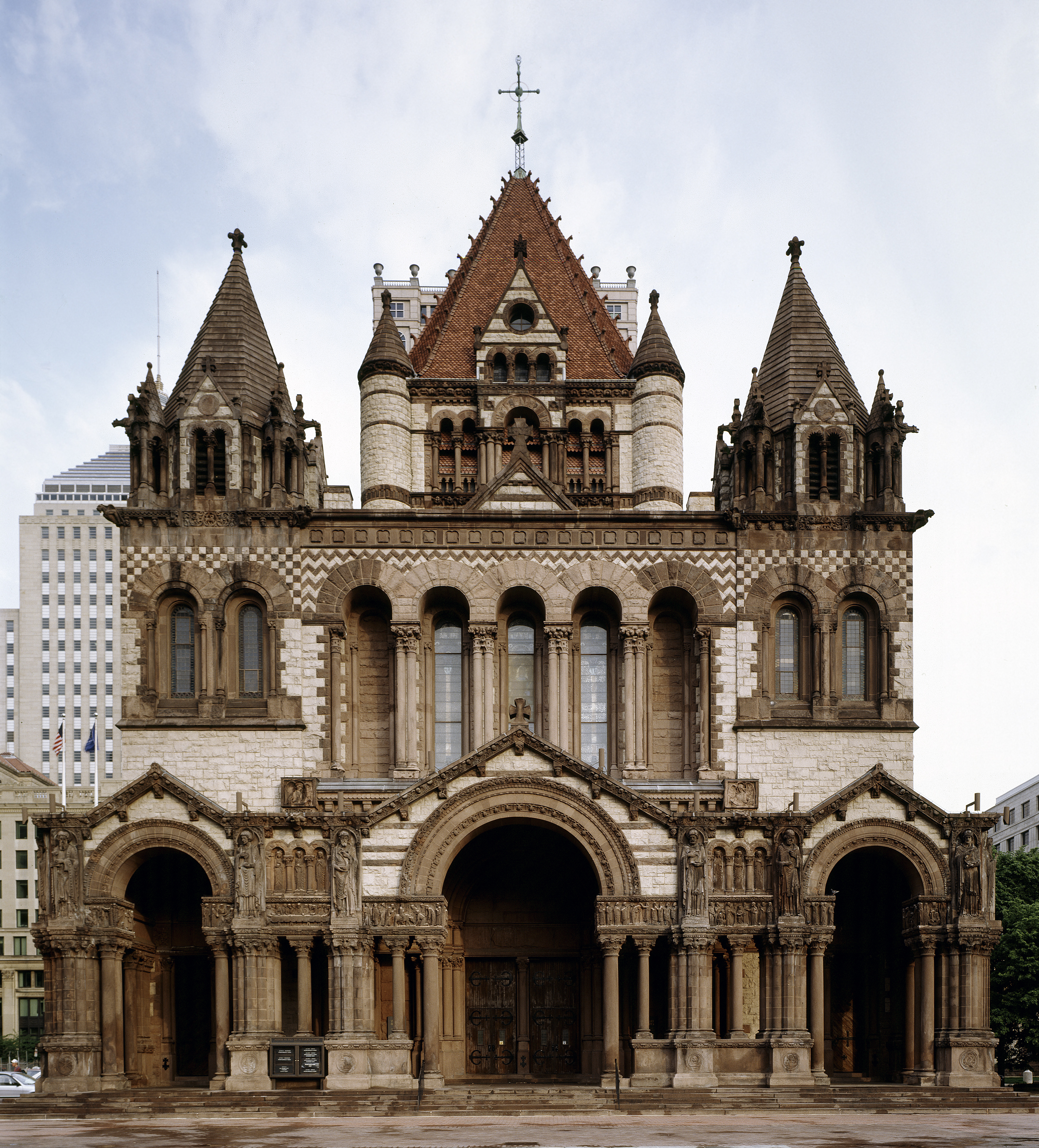
- Trinity Church in Boston

- Location within Boston Location within Massachusetts Location within the United States
- Interactive map showing Trinity Church
- Location: Boston, Massachusetts, U.S.
- Coordinates: 42°21′0″N 71°4′32″W
- Built: 1872–77
- Architect: Henry Hobson Richardson
- Architectural style: Richardsonian Romanesque
- Part of: Back Bay Historic District (ID73001948)
- NRHP reference No.: 70000733

Significant dates
- Added to NRHP: July 1, 1970
- Designated NHL: December 30, 1970
- Designated CP: August 14, 1973

Trinity Church in the City of Boston, located in the Back Bay neighborhood of Boston, Massachusetts, is a parish of the Episcopal Diocese of Massachusetts. The congregation, currently standing at approximately 4,000 households, was founded in 1733. Three services are offered each Sunday, and weekday services are offered four times a week from September through June. Within the spectrum of worship styles in the Anglican tradition, Trinity Church has historically been considered a Broad Church parish.

In addition to worship, the parish is actively involved in service to the community, pastoral care, programs for children and teenagers, and Christian education for all ages. The church is home to several high-level choirs, including the Trinity Choir, Trinity Schola, Trinity Choristers, and Trinity Chamber Choir. The building, designed by Henry Hobson Richardson, is currently under study for becoming a Boston Landmark.

== History ==
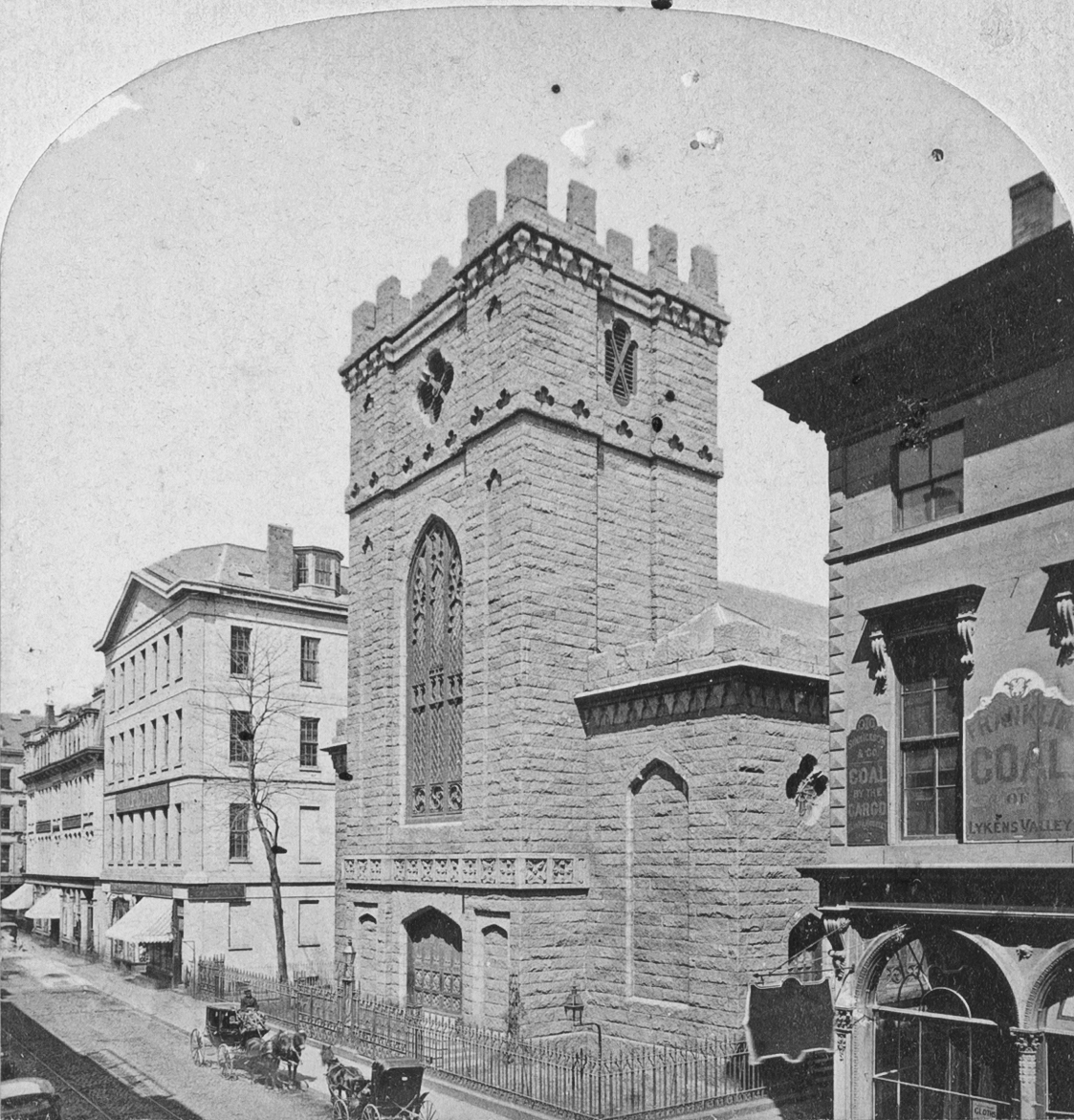
The former Trinity Church, constructed in 1735 and destroyed in the Great Boston Fire of 1872

After its former site on Summer Street burned in the Great Boston Fire of 1872, the current church complex was erected under the direction of Rector Phillips Brooks (1835–1893), one of the best-known and most charismatic preachers of his time.

The church and parish house were designed by Henry Hobson Richardson and construction took place from 1872 to 1877, when the complex was consecrated. Situated on Copley Square in Back Bay, Trinity Church is the building that established Richardson's reputation. It is the birthplace and archetype of the Richardsonian Romanesque style, characterized by a clay roof, polychromy, rough stone, heavy arches, and a massive tower. This style was soon adopted for a number of public buildings across the United States. The stone used was Dedham Granite.

Stanford White, then working in H.H. Richardson's office, designed the current main tower of the Trinity Church of Boston in 1872, basing it on the romanesque tower of the Old Cathedral of Salamanca (Spain).

According to L.C. Norton, the inventor of door checks, the heavy main entrance doors of Trinity Church were the first to be fitted with a quiet and effective means to resist slamming. This led to a patented pneumatic door check that was seen throughout the 1880s to 1910s. Norton's door check device eventually developed into the modern door closer with his guidance in both the Norton Door Controls and LCN companies.

== Music ==
=== Choirs ===
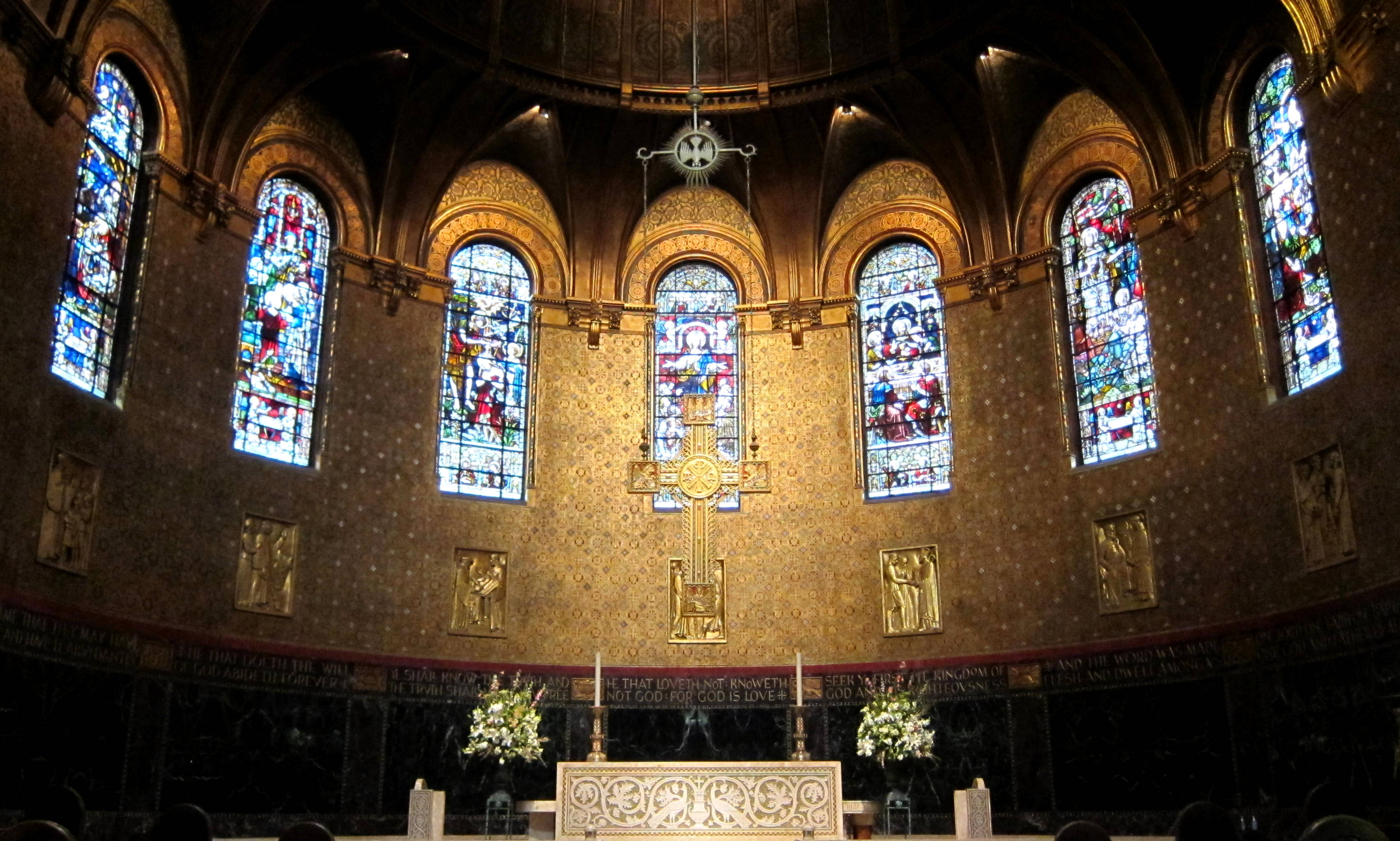
The sanctuary at Trinity Church

Each December, the choirs of Trinity offer three iterations of a service of Candlelight Carols. These are a "Boston tradition", and very popular events, drawing nearly 5,000 attendees from as far away as Maine. A traditional scene in Copley Square in December is that of a long line of people waiting to enter the church for the free event. The service is based on the Nine Lessons and Carols model developed at King's College, Cambridge from a service at Truro Cathedral in Cornwall.

In addition to their primary function of supporting worship, the choirs of Trinity Church are fixtures in the rich musical landscape of Boston. The Trinity Choir has toured extensively, and can be heard on several critically acclaimed recordings. The Trinity Choristers are a group of children who learn music and sing in the tradition of the Royal School of Church Music. The current Director of Music and Organist is Colin Lynch. The Trinity Choir and Trinity Choristers tour England every three years, serving as choirs-in-residence at major houses of worship such as Ely Cathedral, Chichester Cathedral, and Westminster Abbey (summer 2016).

=== Organs ===
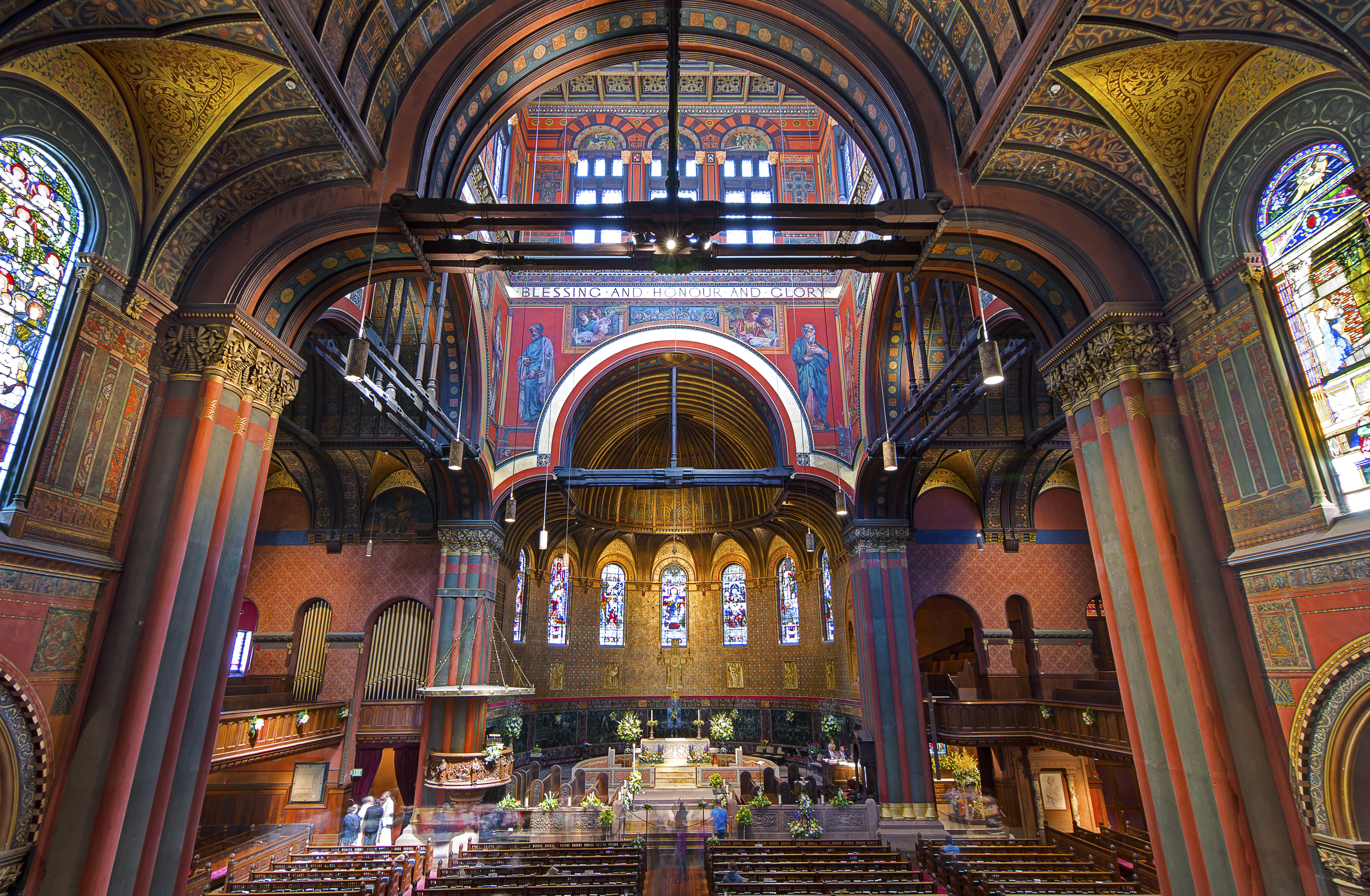
The church's interior in 2014

- 1876: The original organ at Trinity was built by Hilborne L. Roosevelt in 1876, his Opus 29. It had mechanical action, assisted by Barker levers on all divisions and an electrically controlled Echo division, but its location in the chancel proved unsatisfactory, and the organ was moved to the gallery.
- 1903: Hutchings-Votey built a new instrument for the chancel and made both organs playable from a single console.
- 1924: Ernest M. Skinner undertook a rebuilding project, Opus 479, involving changes to both the Roosevelt and Hutchings-Votey instruments, but by 1926 it had expanded to Opus 573 as a virtually new organ in the gallery, as well as a new chancel console.
- 1956: Aeolian-Skinner provided a new console in 1956 and, in 1960, installed a new chancel organ.
- 1962: The gallery organ was extensively rebuilt, and major tonal modifications were made by Jason McKown, who maintained the organs for many years.
- 1987: Jack Steinkampf' installed a rank of horizontal trumpet pipes under the west gallery window. This festival trumpet is given in memory of Paul Albert Merrill.
- Late 1990s: In conjunction with the parish's building campaign, a plan was set out with Foley-Baker, Inc., for the cleaning and refurbishment of both organs and their joint console.
- Late 2010s: Since 2012, the Church has slowly acquired a stockpile of Skinner and Aeolian-Skinner pipes from the general period of Trinity's organ. The pipes were installed and the organ reworked in an attempt to recapture the original Skinner sound. This work was a collaboration of Trinity's former and current organ curators: Foley-Baker Inc., of Tolland, Connecticut (who renovated the nave organ in 1999–2001, and the chancel organ in 2007), and Jonathan Ambrosino, who also maintains the organs at Old South Church and Church of the Advent. In 2018 a new four-manual organ console was built by Richard Houghten of Milan, Michigan, and J. Zamberlan & Co., in Wintersville, Ohio.

The nave and chancel organs feature 121 stops, 113 ranks, and 6898 pipes.

== Worship ==
Trinity Church offers three services of Holy Eucharist on Sundays. Weekday services include Wednesday Evensong and Tuesday Holy Eucharist, as well as an online-only Compline service on Tuesday and Thursday evenings.

Trinity has played host to many special services over the years, due mainly to its central location in Boston, large seating capacity, and reputation as a parish willing to open its doors and be "Boston's church." These services have included interfaith (Christian, Jewish, Muslim) services immediately following the 9/11 attacks, a similar service following the July 2005 London bombings, and many prominent funerals, consecrations of bishops, and the like.

== Community service ==
The parish supports many forms of community outreach and social justice ministry. These include partnerships with Rosie's Place, the Greater Boston Interfaith Organization, Pine Street Inn, Habitat for Humanity, Community Servings, the Walk for Hunger, the Rodman Ride for Kids, and others. The Trinity Boston Foundation is a nonprofit organization with a mission to support the social and emotional well-being and development of young people. Formed in 2007, it grew out of several of Trinity Church's outreach ministries, and now functions as a separately incorporated subsidiary organization that directly serves approximately 500 young people in the Boston community. Trinity Boston Connects' (formerly known as the Trinity Boston Foundation) programs honor and respect people of all faith traditions, including those with no faith tradition.

== Rectors ==
In the Episcopal Church in the United States of America, the Rector is the priest elected to head a self-supporting parish. Because of the importance of Trinity Church in the life of the city of Boston, the Rectors had great influence in the political and social sphere, especially in the early years of the church through the mid-1900s.

Phillips Brooks, who was Rector from 1869 to 1891 has been memorialized in the official calendar of the Episcopal Church. His feast day in the calendar according to the 1979 Book of Common Prayer is January 23. His statue is located on the left exterior of the church.

The following are the Rectors of Trinity Church from its founding to the present day:

- Addington Davenport (1740–1746)
- William Hooper (1747–1767)
- William Walter (1768–1776)
- Samuel Parker (1779–1804)
- John Sylvester John Gardiner (1805–1830)
- George Washington Doane (1831–1832)
- Jonathan Mayhew Wainwright (1833–1838)
- Manton Eastburn (1842–1868)
- Phillips Brooks (1869–1891)
- Elijah Winchester Donald (1892–1904)
- Alexander Mann (1905–1922)
- Henry Knox Sherrill (1923–1930)
- Arthur Lee Kinsolving (1930–1940)
- Oliver James Hart (1940–1942)
- Theodore Parker Ferris (1942–1972)
- Thom Williamson Blair (1974–1981)
- Spencer Morgan Rice (1982–1992)
- Samuel T. Lloyd III (1993–2005)
- Anne Berry Bonnyman (2006–2011)
- Samuel T. Lloyd III (2011–2018)
- Morgan S. Allen (2019–present)

== Art and architecture ==
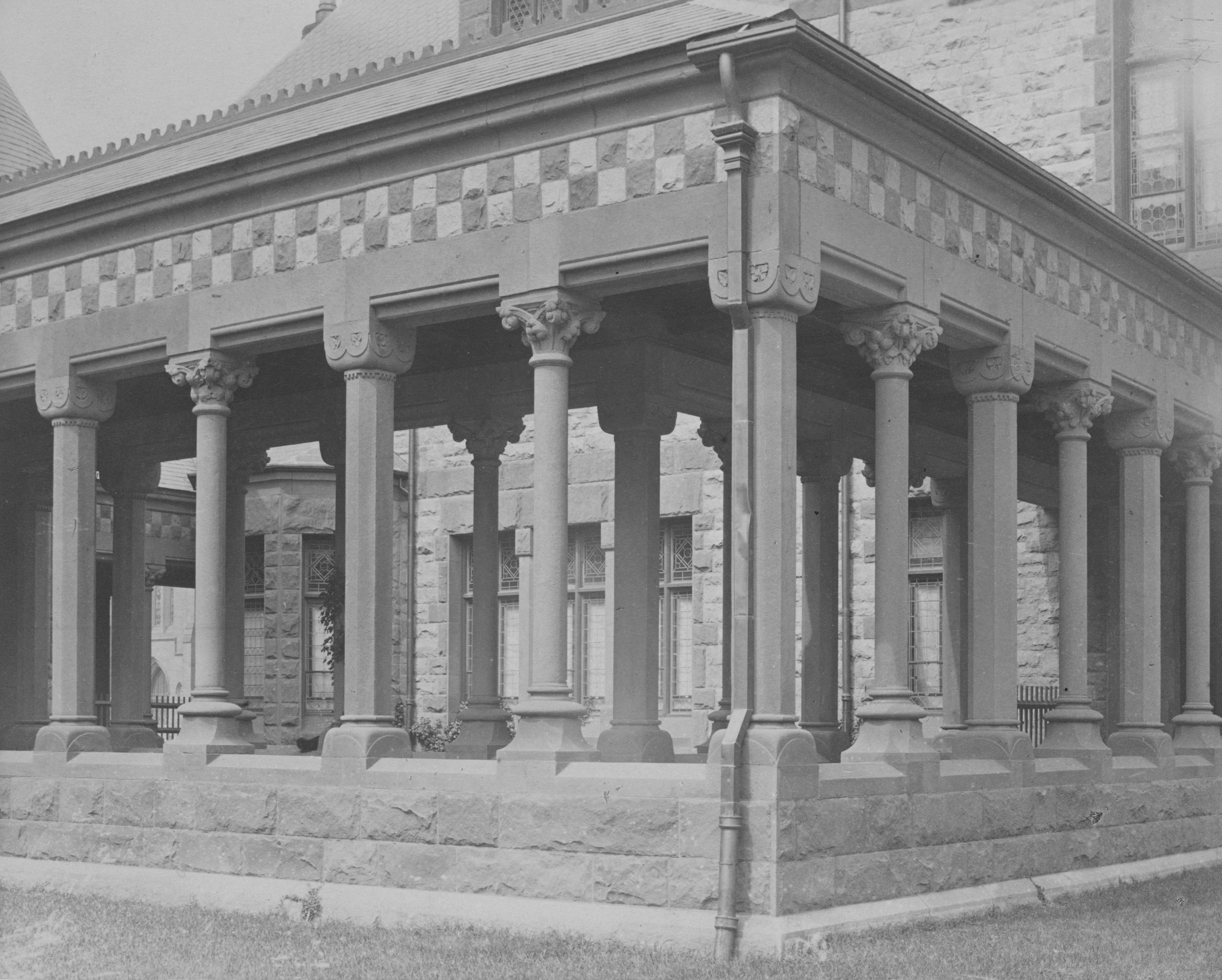
Albumen print of Trinity Church detail, ca. 1877–1898

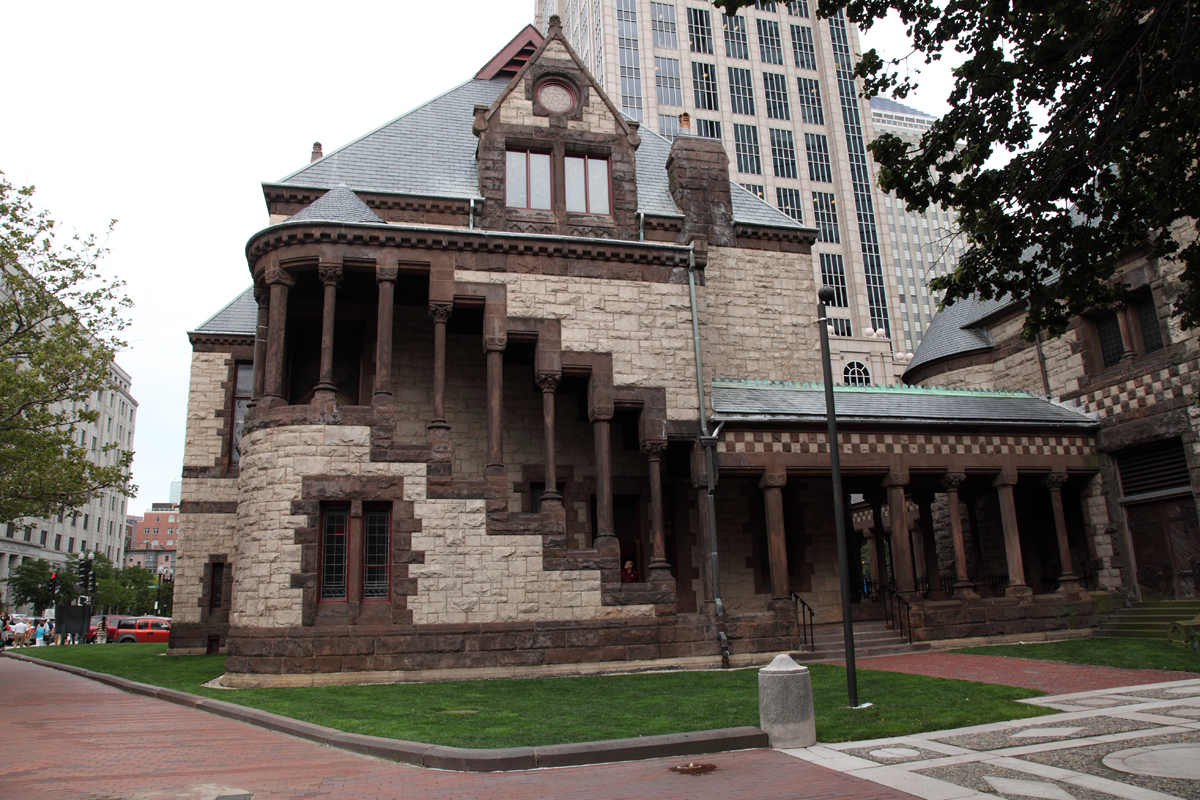
Exterior staircase

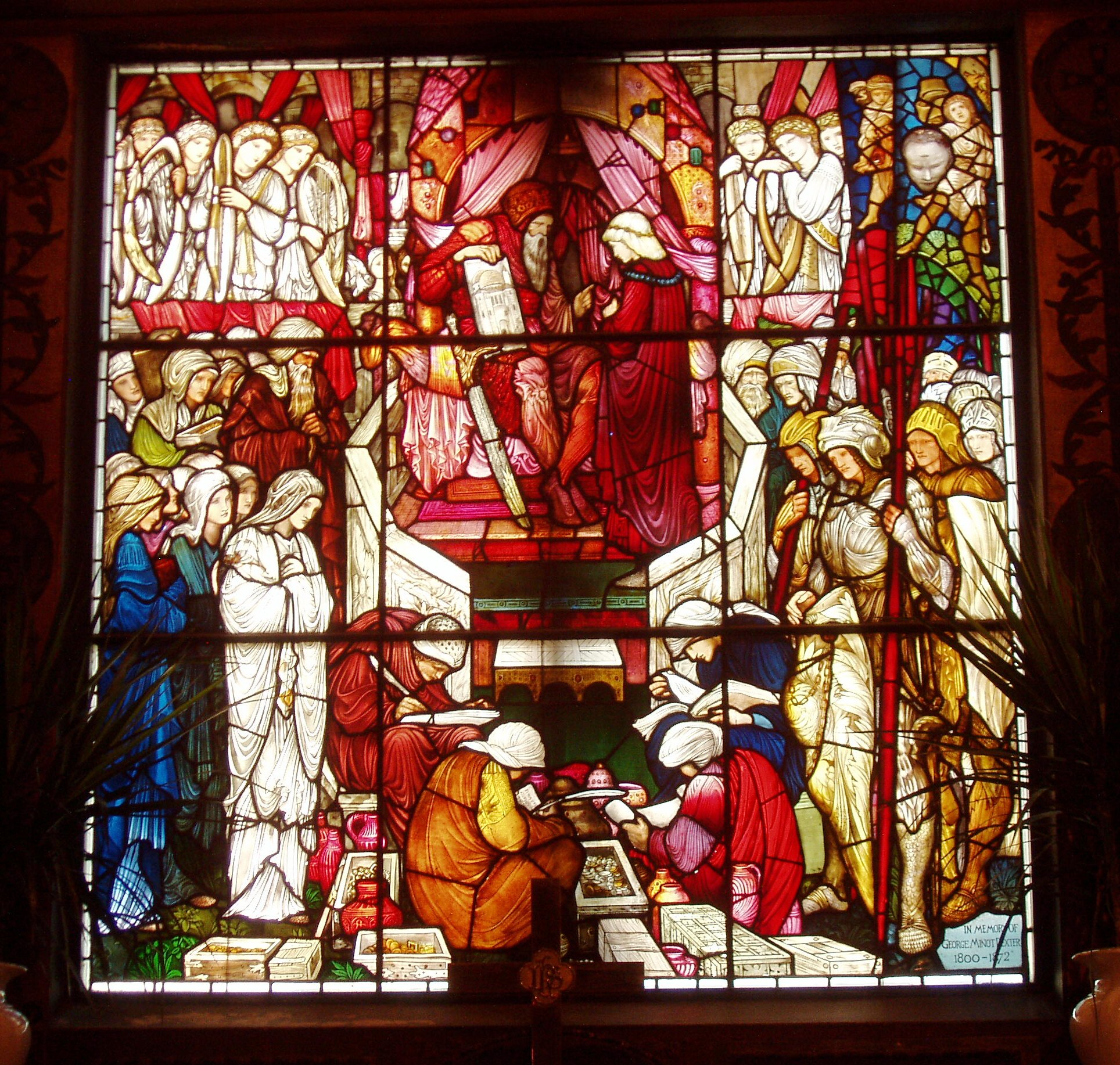
David's Charge to Solomon, a stained-glass window installed in 1882 by Edward Burne-Jones and William Morris in Trinity Church

The building's plan is a modified Greek Cross with four arms extending outwards from the central tower, which stands 64 m (211 ft) tall. The church is situated in Copley Square, and since the 1970s, in the shadow of the John Hancock Tower. Having been built in Boston's Back Bay, which was originally a mud flat, Trinity rests on some 4,500 wooden piles, each driven through 30 feet of gravel fill, silt, and clay, and constantly wetted by the water table of the Back Bay as they will rot if exposed to air.

The central portal may have been modeled on that of Saint Trophîme at Arles,

Its interior murals, which cover over 21,500 square feet (2,000 m^{2}) were completed entirely by American artists. Richardson and Brooks decided that a richly colored interior was essential and turned to John La Farge (1835–1910) for help. La Farge had never performed a commission on this scale, but realized its importance and asked only for his costs to be covered. The results established La Farge's reputation.

The church's windows were originally clear glass at consecration in 1877, with one exception, but soon major windows were added. Four windows were designed by Edward Burne-Jones and executed by the studio of William Morris. Another four windows were exceptional commissions by John La Farge, and revolutionized window glass with their layering of opalescent glass. The Suter window (donated by Hales W. Suter) was painted by Charles Mills.

Trinity Church is the only church in the United States and the only building in Boston that has been honored as one of the "Ten Most Significant Buildings in the United States" by the American Institute of Architects. In 1885, architects voted Trinity Church as the most important building in the U.S.; Trinity Church is the only building from the original 1885 list still included in the AIA's current top ten list. The building was designated a National Historic Landmark on December 30, 1970.

The church also houses sculptures by Daniel Chester French and Augustus Saint-Gaudens.

== In popular culture ==
In 1985 Trinity Church was featured in the opening scene of the second television episode portraying novelist Robert B. Parker's character— Boston's preeminent detective, Spenser— in Spenser For Hire: "No Room at the Inn".

Interior scenes from the 1999 thriller The Boondock Saints were filmed within Trinity Church.

The church was featured in the 2015 video game Fallout 4.

The Trinity Church was prominently shown in Reba McEntire's 1986 music video for "Whoever's in New England".

== Gallery ==
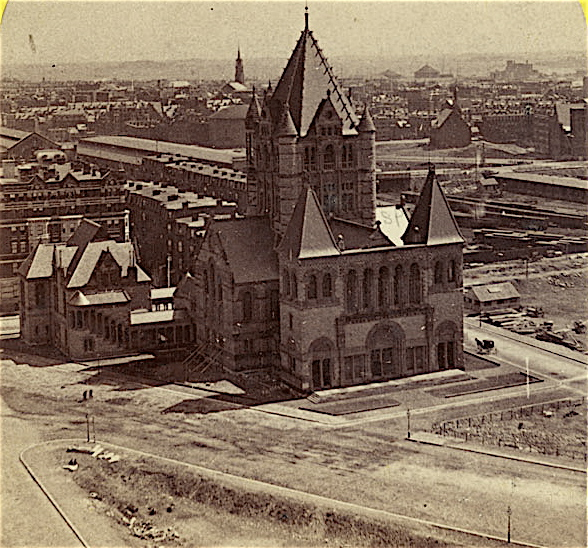
Trinity Church construction, Boston, ca.1875

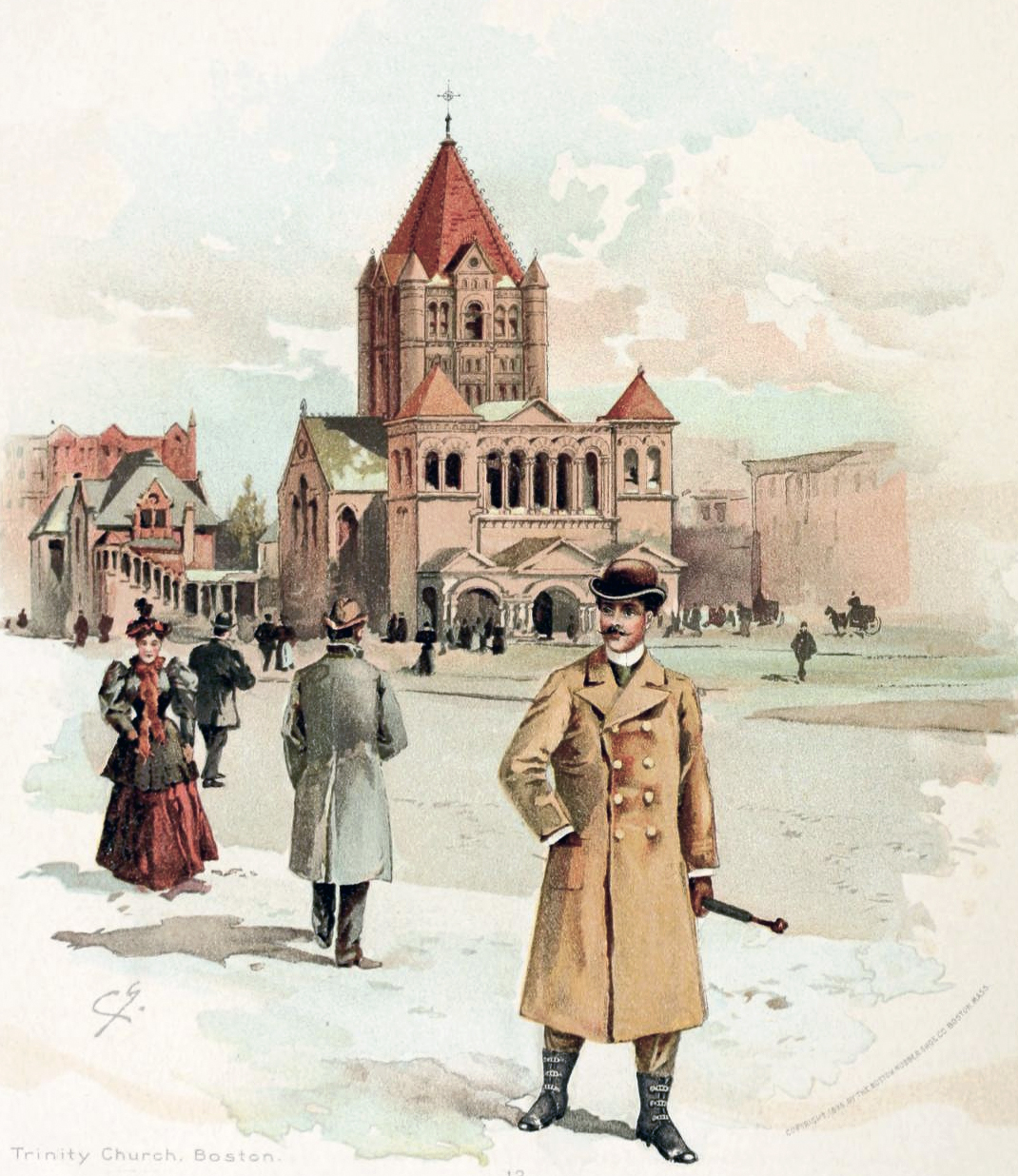
An 1896 illustration of the church

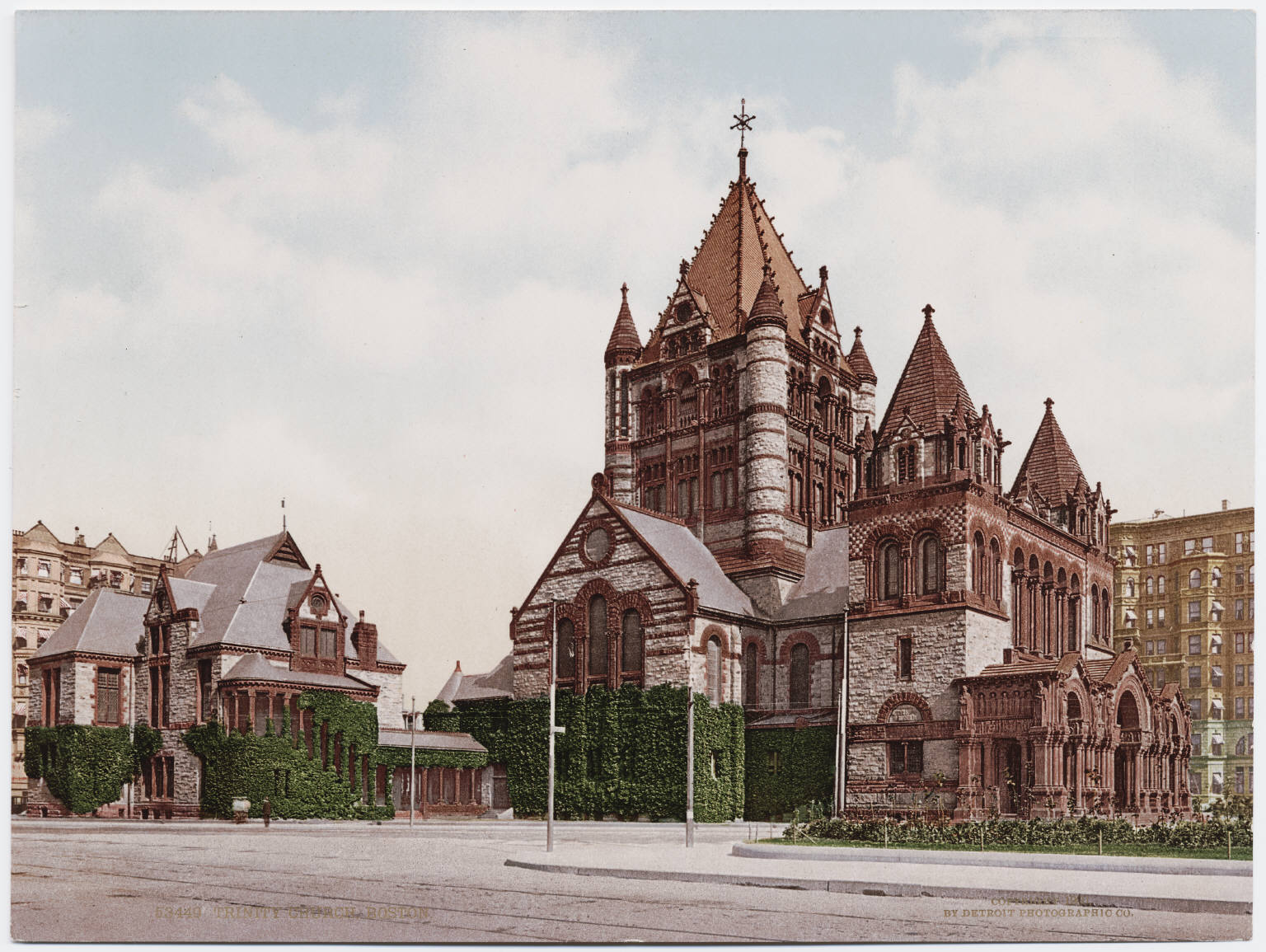
A circa 1900 photograph of the church

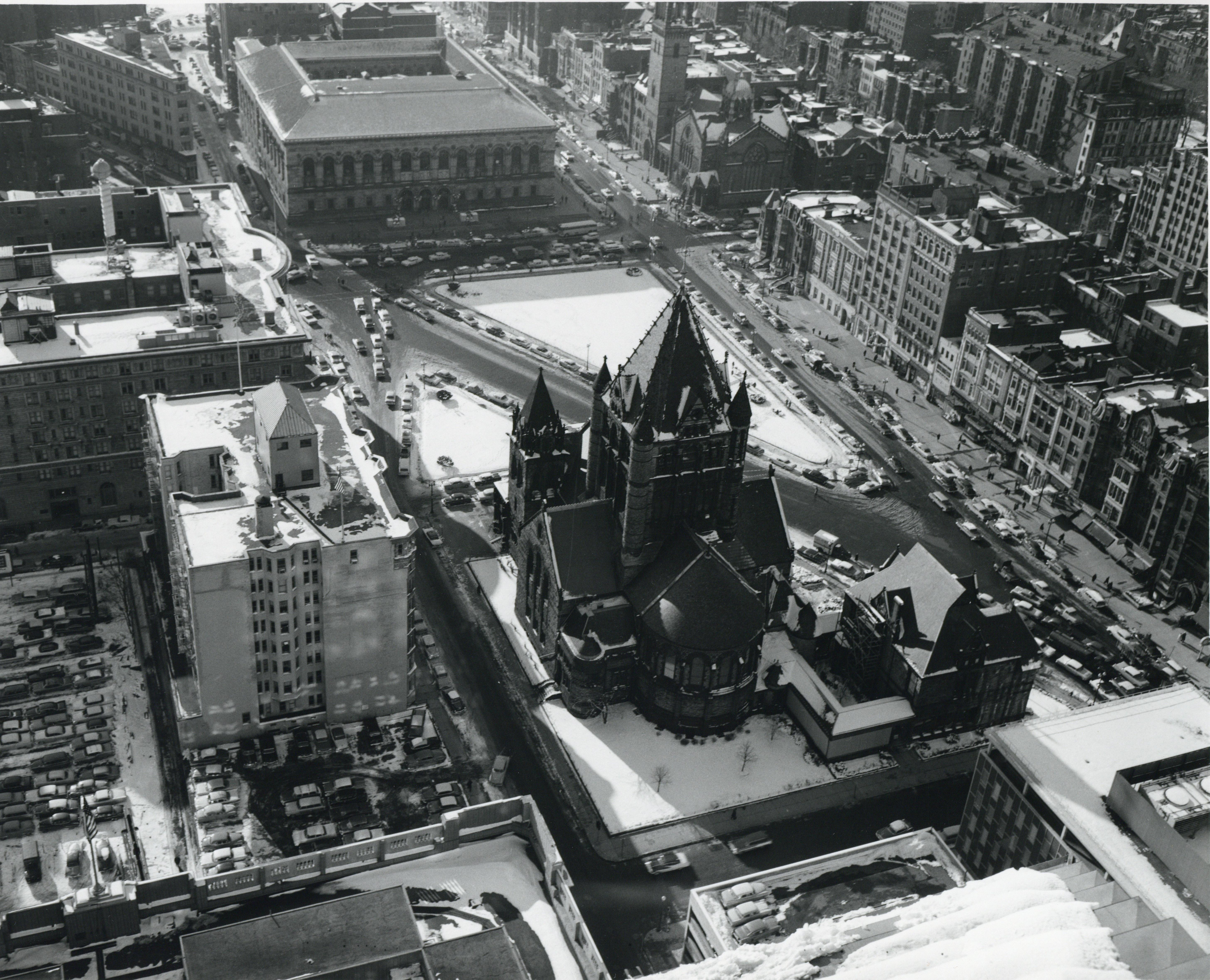
View over the church and Copley Square 1950s

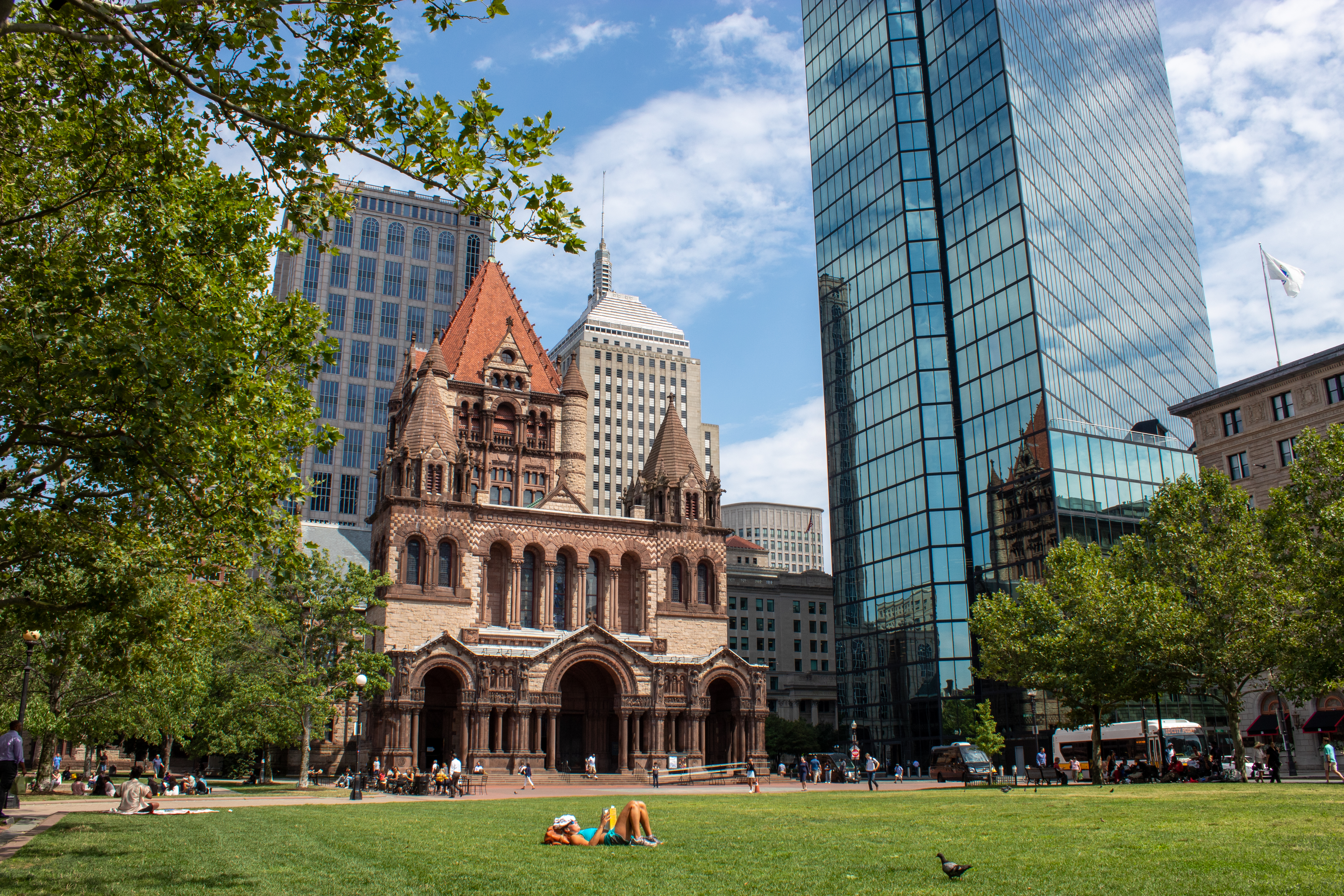
Trinity Church and adjacent John Hancock Tower

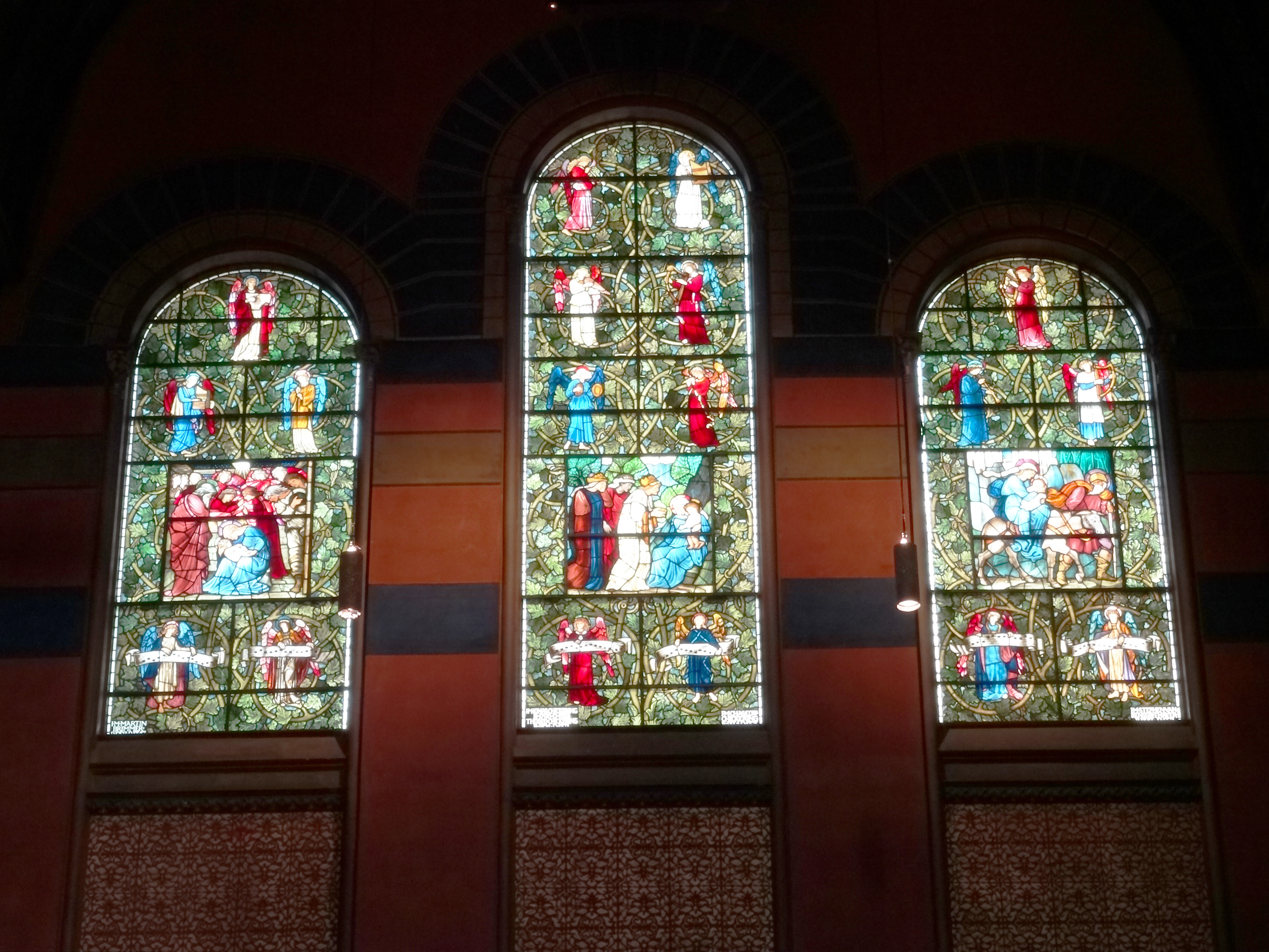
Edward Burne-Jones and William Morris's Stained glass windows "Nativity of Jesus" 1882

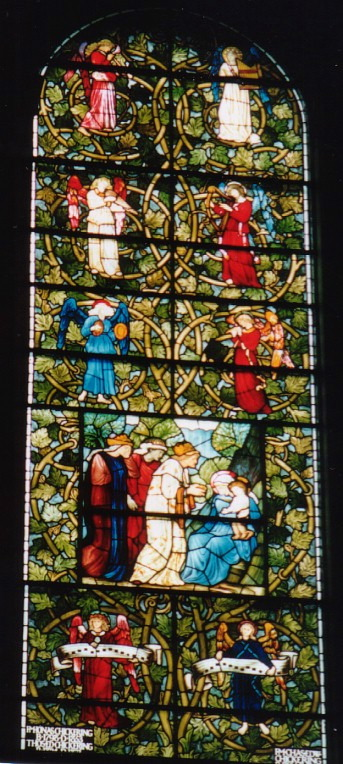
Edward Burne-Jones and William Morris's The Worship of the Magi window, 1882

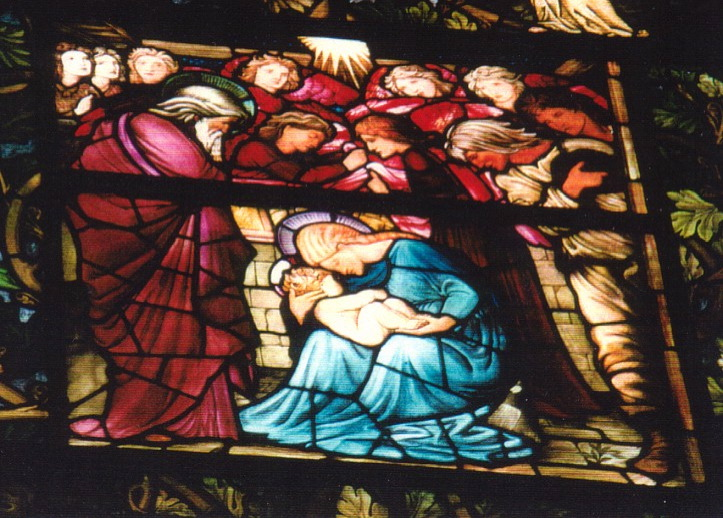
Edward Burne-Jones and William Morris's The Worship of the Shepherds window, 1882

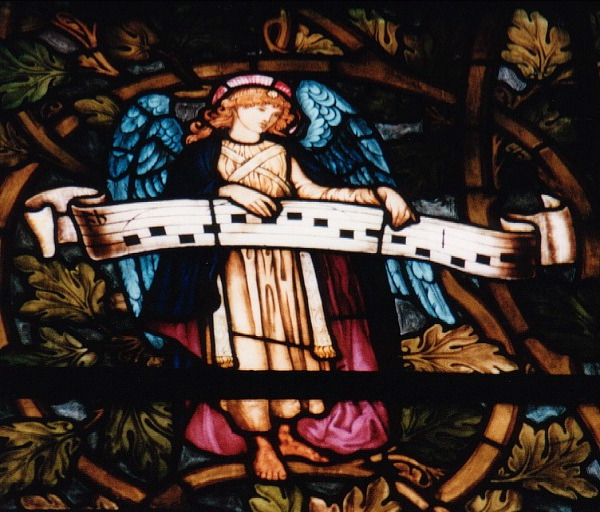
Detail from Edward Burne-Jones and William Morris's The Worship of the Shepherds window, 1882

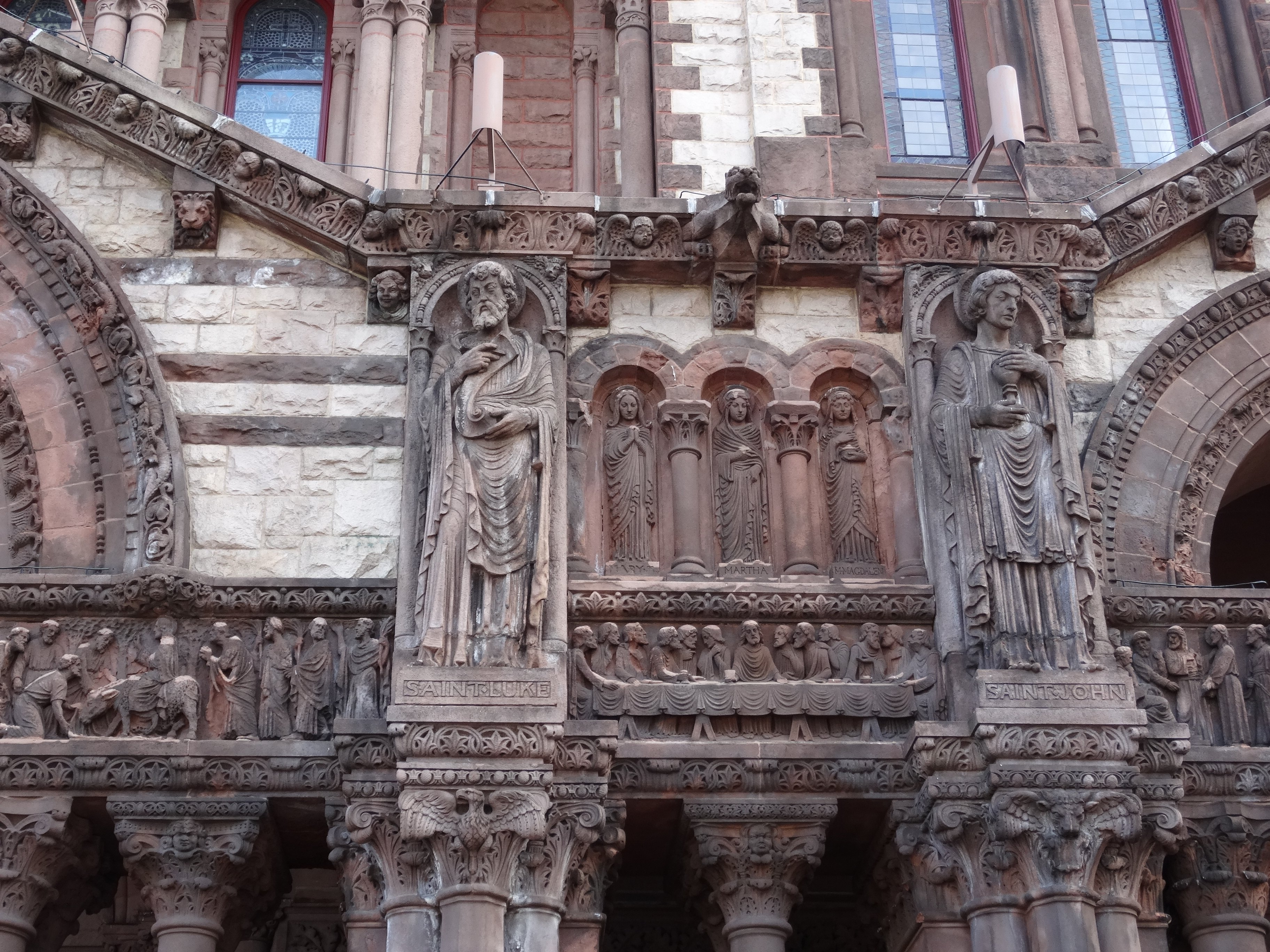
Portal of the Boston Trinity Church

== See also ==
- List of National Historic Landmarks in Boston
- National Register of Historic Places listings in northern Boston, Massachusetts
- Trinity Neighborhood House
- Trinity Rectory
