= Bill Cummings (philanthropist) =

American philanthropist

- Education: Tufts University
- Occupations: Real estate developer; Philanthropist
- Spouse: Joyce Cummings
- Children: 4
- Website: Official website

Bill Cummings is an American philanthropist and real estate developer. As of 2024, his charitable foundations have over $4 billion in assets. The Cummings School of Veterinary Medicine and Cummings Veterinary Medical Center at Tufts University as well as the Cummings School of Architecture and Real Estate at Roger Williams University are named after his philanthropic work.

== Career ==
=== Real estate ===
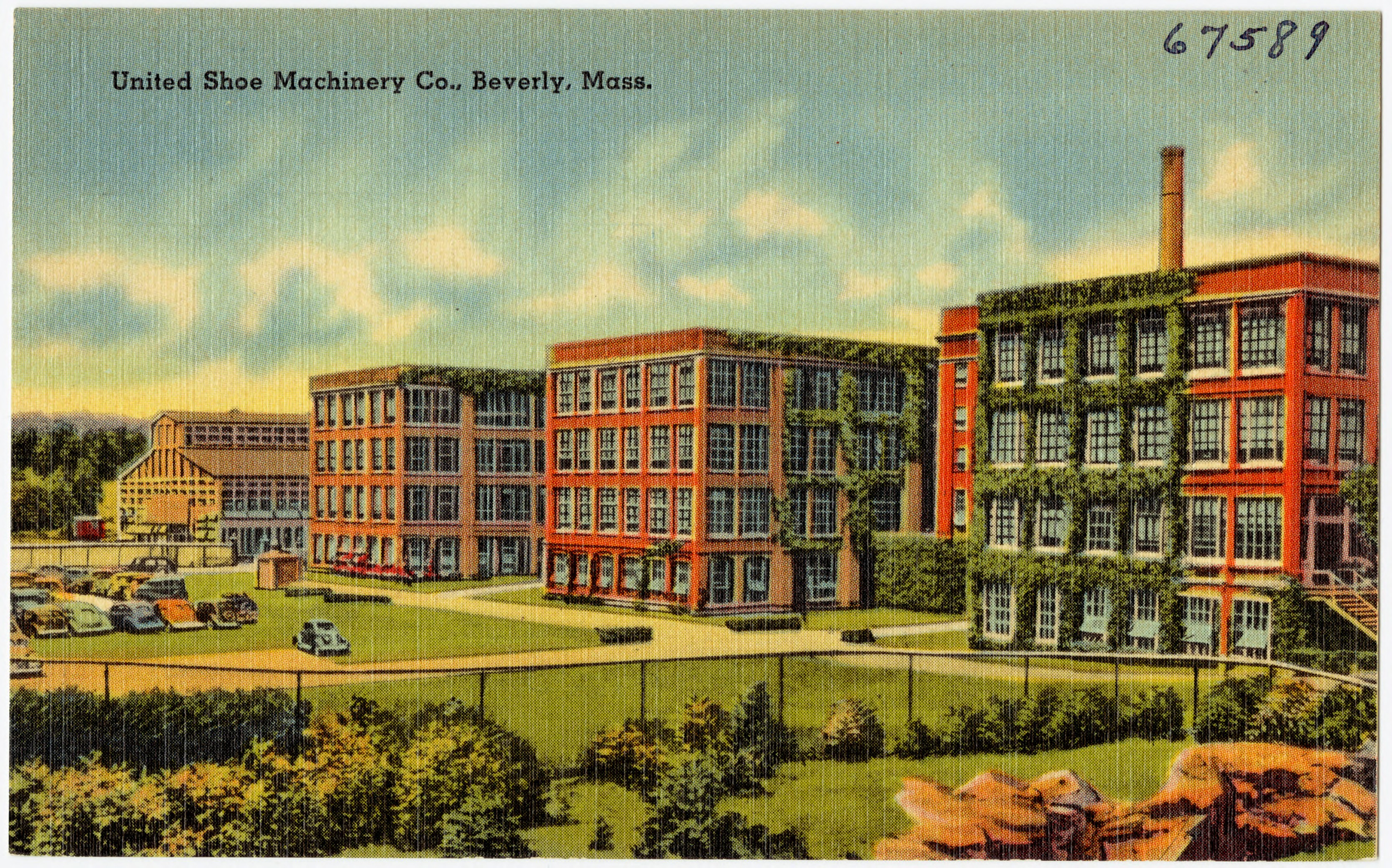
A vintage postcard with the United Shoe Machinery factory in Beverly, Massachusetts, now Cummings Center

Cummings founded his real estate company, Cummings Properties, in 1970. The company, Cummings Properties, started with one small building in Woburn, Massachusetts, and has expanded to include 11 million square feet across 12 Boston communities. In 1996, Cummings bought the former factory of the United Shoe Machinery Corporation in Beverly, Massachusetts; it is now known as Cummings Center. In January 2026, it purchased Bedford Woods, a 330,000-square-foot property in Bedford, MA.

Although primarily a commercial real estate developer, Cummings Properties has developed residential real estate as well. It built the 150-unit Place Lane Condominium in Woburn, Massachusetts in 1986 and the luxury Elliott Landing condominium in Beverly, Massachusetts in 2016. In 2026, it added the luxury 60-home Beverly Landing condominium to its Cummings Center campus in Beverly, MA.

=== Philanthropy ===
Cummings and his wife Joyce established Cummings Foundation in 1986, pledging to give 10 percent of their income to it annually but eventually committed to most of the family's commercial real estate holdings to the foundation.

In 2004, Cummings made his largest gift to date, a $50 million donation to Tufts University's veterinary school; it was the largest endowment in the institution's history.

In 2011, they signed The Giving Pledge, reflecting their desire to donate substantially all of their wealth to charity.

In 2012, the foundation started its "$100K for 100" program, which gives out 100 grants of $100,000 every year to nonprofits supporting human services, education, healthcare, and social justice in Boston.

His foundation gave $15 million, which Bill & Melinda Gates Foundation then matched, to establish University of Global Health Equity in Rwanda. The school graduated its first class of master's students in 2017.

In 2017, his foundation gave $35 million to charity.

As of 2018, Cummings Foundation is one of the largest foundations in New England, and has donated over $225 million. The foundation also has several subsidiaries, including the nonprofit New Horizons retirement communities.

In November 2019, Cummings was recognized by the New England Real Estate Journal with the Lifetime Achievement Award.

In February 2022, the Benjamin Franklin Institute of Technology announced it received a $12.5 million gift from the Cummings Foundation to advance its work in creating technical career pathways for students typically underrepresented in post-secondary education. In recognition of the transformational nature of the commitment—nearly equivalent to the school's annual operating budget—the college was renamed Benjamin Franklin Cummings Institute of Technology.

In April 2022, the Cummings Foundation and Roger Williams University announced a $20 million partnership and the renaming of the RWU School of Architecture, Art, and Historic Preservation to the Cummings School of Architecture and Real Estate.

Cummings Properties and its affiliated foundation are annually named among Massachusetts' largest corporate charitable contributors by the Boston Business Journal. They were name the top largest corporate charitable contributor in Massachusetts for 2024.

In 2023, Cummings Foundation committed $2.5 million to Winchester Hospital to support upgrades to the Dr. Peter Rotolo Labor and Delivery Unit. The upgrades were completed in 2025.

== Personal life ==
Cummings grew up in Medford, Massachusetts and graduated from Tufts University in 1958 with a Bachelor of Arts in Economics.

Cummings published his autobiography, Starting Small and Making it Big, in 2018. Also in 2018, Forbes Magazine ranked him on its annual Top Givers List, based on contributed gifts made in 2017.

In 2025, Medford Chamber of Commerce named Bill Cummings the Citizen of the Year at its 97th Annual Installation and Awards Banquet.

== Cummings Properties ==
Founded in Woburn, Massachusetts in 1970 by Bill Cummings, Cummings Properties is a Boston-area commercial real estate firm that operates a portfolio of 11 million square feet of commercial real estate across 12 suburban cities and towns in the greater Boston area: Andover, Bedford, Beverly, Burlington, Marlborough, Medford, Somerville, Stoneham, Sudbury, Wakefield, Wilmington, and Woburn.

Its portfolio includes a wide variety of commercial spaces, including executive offices, healthcare facilities, laboratories, retail storefronts, medical offices, and warehouses.

Cummings Properties offers services related to leasing, property management, design, and construction, supporting businesses across Eastern Massachusetts, particularly in the Boston metropolitan area. The company employs skilled tradespeople-including carpenters, plumbers, electricians, and HVAC technicians-who manage both routine maintenance and custom construction projects, including laboratory buildouts and office space renovations.

The firm has incorporated sustainability practices into its operations, including the installation of electric vehicle (EV) charging stations at several of its business campuses/ These include locations such as Cummings Center in Beverly, Boston Avenue in Medford, New Horizons in Marlborough; and multiple sites in Woburn, including TradeCenter 128, West Cummings Park, and properties on Cabot Road and Commerce Way.

Cummings Properties was named a 2025 Mass Save Climate Leader by Massachusetts' energy efficiency program for its sustained commitment to sustainability, having implemented energy-saving upgrades across its commercial real-estate portfolio--such as electric heat pumps, LED lighting retrofits, improved insulation, and advanced HVAC controls--which are expected to save of 2 million kWh of electricity and cut greenhouse gas emissions.
