= Samuel T. Lloyd III =

- Born: June 24, 1950; Brookhaven, Mississippi, U.S.
- Died: August 31, 2022 (aged 72); Nashville, TN, U.S.
- Education: University of Virginia, Virginia Theological Seminary, Georgetown University, University of Mississippi
- Occupation: Priest
- Known for: Rector of Trinity Church, Boston
- Title: Dean of the Washington National Cathedral
- Term: April 23, 2005 – September 18, 2011

Samuel T. Lloyd III (June 24, 1950 – August 31, 2022) was a priest of the Episcopal Church in the United States who served as the ninth Dean of the Washington National Cathedral, having been installed there on April 23, 2005, and serving until September 18, 2011. Before his tenure as dean, he had been the rector of Trinity Church in Boston, Massachusetts, one of the largest Episcopal congregations in the United States. He returned to Trinity after leaving the National Cathedral. Earlier in his ministry he had been chaplain of the University of the South and rector of the Church of St. Paul and the Redeemer in Chicago, Illinois. He retired as rector of Trinity Church in June 2017.

He was a regent of the University of the South, a trustee of Episcopal Media Center, and was on the Board of Ministry at Harvard University. He was published in several Anglican journals and was a veteran of the U.S. Air Force.

== Education ==
Lloyd received a doctorate in English literature from the University of Virginia, a divinity degree from Virginia Theological Seminary, and an M.A. degree in English literature from Georgetown University. He received his B.A. from the University of Mississippi in 1971.

== National Cathedral tenure ==
Lloyd's tenure as Dean of the Washington National Cathedral was 2005–2011. During his time in Washington, he celebrated the Cathedral’s centennial, launched a resident congregation that continues as the beating heart of the Cathedral's worship life, established the Cathedral as a premiere home for important civic conversations, and led Disciples of Christ in Community classes to establish community within the congregation. Throughout his ministry, he was widely regarded as one of the most effective preachers in the modern church. The Cathedral budget, overseen by The Protestant Episcopal Cathedral Foundation (PECF), was affected by the 2009 stock market crash and it had undertaken construction of an expensive underground parking lot shortly after Lloyd arrived (albeit with plans having existed before Lloyd), but expensive and needed repairs to the cathedral itself were not undertaken.
