= Usen Castle =

- The Castle
- U.S. National Register of Historic Places
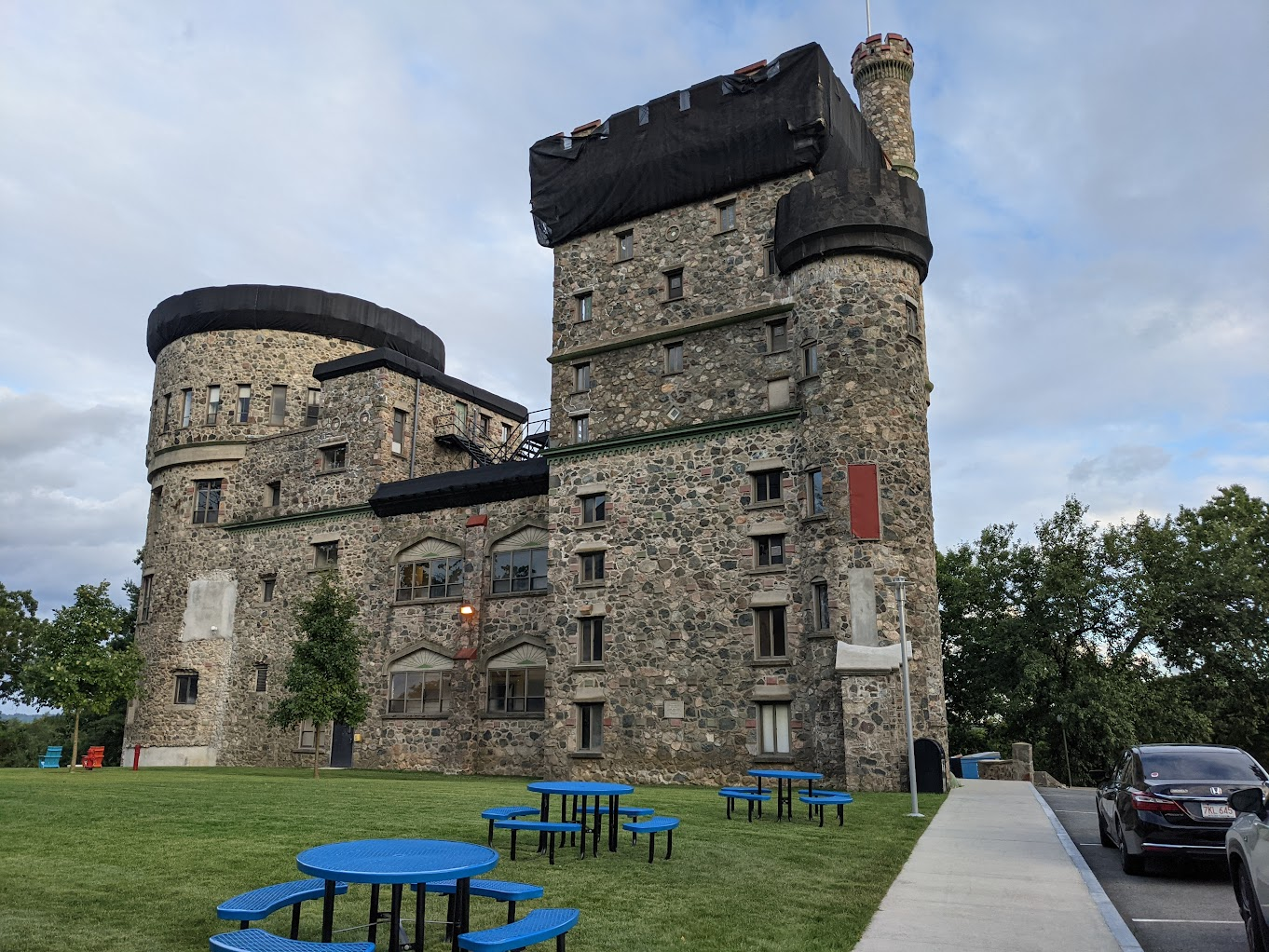

- Location within Massachusetts Location within the United States
- Location: 415 South St., Waltham, Massachusetts
- Coordinates: 42°22′1″N 71°15′21″W
- Built: 1928
- Architect: Smith, John H.
- NRHP reference No.: 79000359
- Added to NRHP: April 09, 1979

The Castle, also known as Usen Castle, is a historic building at 415 South Street in Waltham, Massachusetts. The Medieval style structure, built in 1928 in the style of a Norman castle, stands on the campus of Brandeis University, where it served as a dormitory until 2017. The building, the design of which is unlike any other on the campus or in the city, was listed on the National Register of Historic Places in 1979.

== Description and history ==
Usen Castle is located atop Boston Rock, one of the highest points on the Brandeis campus. It consists of a series of six sections, connected to form an enclosed courtyard. Its exterior, apparently inspired by Lismore Castle in Ireland, features a wide variety of turrets, towers, crenellations, and pinnacles. A variety of unusual materials were used in its construction, including colored concrete and ceramic inlays. The interior retains Gothic features, giving the current student residential users a distinctive feel not found in other residences on the campus.

The Castle was built in 1928 by Dr. John Hall Smith, founder of the Middlesex College of Medicine and Surgery, on whose campus it stood until the school closed in 1945. The campus and school charter were acquired by the founders of Brandeis. The building at first housed administrative offices as well as a dormitory and dining hall, but was converted to exclusively residential use in the 1950s. The building is one of two to survive on the campus from its Middlesex College days, and is a sharp contrast to the otherwise modern buildings there.

In Summer 2017, after much of the building was condemned as unsafe by the city of Waltham, the University demolished Castle Towers C, D and E, and Schwartz Castle to make way for the new Skyline residence hall. Castle Towers A and B remained as student residences through the end of the 2016 fall semester.

== See also ==
- National Register of Historic Places listings in Waltham, Massachusetts
