= Middlesex University (Massachusetts) =

Former university in Massachusetts, United States

Coordinates: 42°22′01″N 71°15′21″W

- Former seal of Middlesex University
- Former names: Middlesex College of Medicine & Surgery (1914–1936)
- Type: Private
- Active: 1914–1947 (became Brandeis University)
- Location: Waltham, Massachusetts, United States
- Campus: Suburban

Middlesex University, known primarily for its medical and veterinary schools, operated from 1914 until 1947, first in Cambridge, Massachusetts, United States, later in Waltham, Massachusetts.

== History ==
The "Middlesex College of Medicine and Surgery" was founded in 1914 by John Hall Smith and originally located in East Cambridge, Massachusetts. It was affiliated with the Middlesex Hospital. In 1917, Massachusetts chartered an institution named the "University of Massachusetts" with the same board of trustees. Until then, there was no University of Massachusetts. (The present-day University of Massachusetts (Amherst) is a completely unrelated institution; it was known at that time as "Massachusetts Agricultural College", later "Massachusetts State College", and did not become the "University of Massachusetts" until 1947, the year Middlesex closed.)

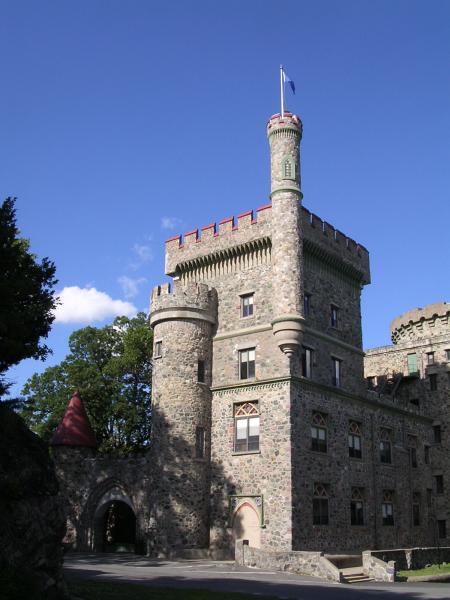
"The Castle", originally the main building of Middlesex University

In 1928, it moved to the Waltham campus, the present-day campus of Brandeis University. The building which Brandeis calls "The Castle" was originally the main building of Middlesex University and was designed and constructed by John Hall Smith between 1928 and 1940.

In 1935 Middlesex College of Medicine and Surgery received authorization to grant B.A. and B.S. degrees and became "Middlesex College". In 1937 it merged with the University of Massachusetts to become "Middlesex University", with schools of medicine, liberal arts, pharmacy, podiatry, and veterinary medicine, and the state of Massachusetts reclaimed the name "University of Massachusetts" for the state college.

Middlesex University was important as a veterinary school; it was the only veterinary school in New England, and when it closed in 1947, there were none in New England until Tufts University opened Cummings in 1978. As of 2012, two Middlesex graduates were still practicing in Massachusetts, and four more were still living.

Middlesex University is described by a Brandeis University web page as "a university founded on the principles of equality, freedom, and scholarship, as the school maintained a student population diverse in race, color, and religion, during a time when many universities in the United States had quotas and were not as open." In particular, it freely admitted Jews during a time when most elite universities had Jewish quotas, and it had many Jews among its students and faculty. Its medical school experienced difficulty securing AMA accreditation. The AMA said this was due to insufficient funds, faculty, and facilities, but some at the university believed that antisemitism played a role. In the words of C. Ruggles Smith, son of the founder:

From its inception, Middlesex was ruthlessly attacked by the American Medical Association, which at that time was dedicated to restricting the production of physicians, and to maintaining an inflexible policy of discrimination in the admission of medical students. Middlesex, alone among medical schools, selected its students on the basis of merit, and refused to establish any racial quotas.

In 1944, a Massachusetts law making doctor's licensing dependent on holding an MD from an AMA-accredited medical school, and financial problems caused by World War II, made the situation of Middlesex University untenable. In 1946, the Middlesex trustees transferred the charter and campus of the university to the foundation which was to establish Brandeis, with the hope, not to be realized, that Brandeis would be able to continue the medical and veterinary schools. In 1947, Brandeis, feeling that the financial burden of operating the medical school was too great and closed its doors. According to the account of Rabbi Israel Goldtstein on page 25 of his 1951 book Brandeis University: Chapter of its Founding, the first three medical school classes had been suspended prior to Brandeis' acquisition of the charter and campus. However, by this same account Brandeis University did choose to close the school of veterinary medicine.
