= Monster Pulse =

Webcomic by Magnolia Porter

Monster Pulse is an all-ages fantasy webcomic written and illustrated by Magnolia Porter. The comic began in 2011 and completed on 4 June 2021.

== Synopsis ==
Set in a small Pacific Northwest town, Monster Pulse follows four children who have 'body-monsters' – spirits which turn an organ into an external, sentient monster. Bina, the main character, has her heart possessed by a spirit and become a friendly monster she calls Ayo. Other children have monsters from other organs: Abel's monster is formed of one of his eyes, Desmond's monster is his stomach, and Julie's monster her hair. A corporation called Shell unwittingly released the technology that caused this, and it seeks to control the power of these monsters.

As of 2014, the comic was updating three times a week.

== Themes and reviews ==
Writing for The Beat, Maggie Vicknair described Monster Pulse as "a really excellent and polished work of all-ages comics, with its focus on character development, beautiful art, and slight dark edge." Vicknair said that the comic "pulls its influences very clearly from children's television, especially cartoons from the 90's onward", such as Digimon and Pokémon. Vicknair added that "there's a real commitment to steady character development in Monster Pulse, which makes the comic a rich read. The characters are a diverse group of kids which create genuine conflict between them – Julie's earnest energy versus Abel's grumpy stoicism. The children not only have to deal with crazy problems like 'oh no my stomach is now sentient' but more mundane and relatable problems like 'my parents don't understand me.'"

The A.V. Club's reviewer Caitlin Rosenburg said that "like a lot of the very best kids' programming, it's full of sweetness without being cloying or unbelievable, and the lessons it tries to teach feel important without being heavy handed", and said that "Porter has created a world that has some serious depth and reality to it, despite the supernatural foundation of the plot. Each of the kids' monsters correlates to some part of their personality, and it's fascinating to watch what happens as they grow into young adulthood and stare down the barrel of puberty and all that it entails." On the artwork, Rosenburg said that the style "was for a long time sharp and sketchy, with loose lines and almost exclusively drawn in black and white. In later years, the linework has become firmer and smoother, and Porter has added moody color to her panels."

Io9's Lauren Davis, writing in 2011 shortly after the comic began, described Monster Pulse as "an intriguing, all-ages mystery" that "does a lovely job of balancing dynamic action sequences... with likeable character moments." In a 2014 article Davis said that Monster Pulse deserved to be nominated for an Eisner Award. Splinter's Charles Pulliam-Moore praised the comic for reflecting multiple ethnicities.

== Author ==
Magnolia Porter is a writer and illustrator who has worked on other comics such as Bobwhite and Dracula Mystery Club, and has written for video games.
