= Frank and Louie =

World's oldest diprosopus cat (1999–2014)

- Species: Cat
- Breed: Ragdoll
- Sex: Male
- Born: September 8, 1999; North Grafton, Massachusetts, United States
- Died: December 4, 2014 (aged 15); North Grafton, Massachusetts
- Known for: World's oldest diprosopus cat
- Owner: Martha "Marty" Stevens

Frank and Louie, sometimes referred to as Frankenlouie (September 8, 1999 – December 4, 2014), was a diprosopus (also known as "janus" or "two-faced") cat known for his unusual longevity. He was named by the Guinness Book of World Records as the longest surviving janus cat in 2012.

== Early life ==
Frank and Louie was born on September 1999. A breeder brought Frank and Louie to the Cummings School of Veterinary Medicine at Tufts University since the kitten was born with two faces, a condition called diprosopus. The kitten was initially not expected to live beyond a few days, as janus animals usually die within that time-frame. Veterinary nurse Martha "Marty" Stevens took the kitten home to care for it anyway and ended up tube-feeding him for 3 months. Frank and Louie eventually learned to eat on his own and "thrived".

Frank and Louie was born with one brain, but had two faces, two mouths, two noses, and three blue eyes. He had only one functional mouth, however, with the other being born without a bottom jaw. He had one esophagus, connected to the mouth with both jaws. His middle eye was non-functional and did not blink, which made "Frank and Louie appear to be staring even when his other eyes are closed".

== Title ==
In 2012, the Guinness Book of World Records recognized Frank and Louie as the world's oldest living janus cat. This was an uncommon distinction because most janus cats die within days. Armelle deLaforcade of the Cummings School of Veterinary Medicine stated, "The condition itself is very rare, and I think that the fact that this cat became an adult, a healthy adult, is remarkable".

Leslie A. Lyons, an associate professor at the University of Missouri School of Veterinary Medicine and Surgery, called Frank and Louie's longevity "impressive".

== Later life ==
Owner Stevens described Frank and Louie's temperament as an adult as "very, very laid-back, not afraid of people, very friendly, and he's actually more of a dog than a cat. He walks on a leash, he goes right in the car; he loves car-rides".

On November 2014, Frank and Louie's health declined. Stevens brought Frank and Louie back to the Cummings School of Veterinary Medicine where she was told that Frank and Louie likely had an aggressive form of cancer. Since Frank and Louie was "likely suffering", Stevens decided to have him euthanized.
