= Diprosopus =

Medical disorder

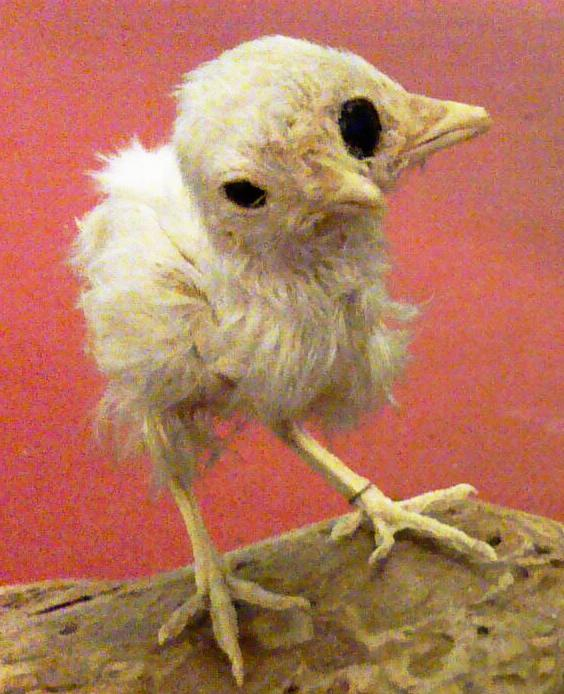
A chick with two beaks and three eyes

Diprosopus (Greek: διπρόσωπος, "two-faced", from δι-, di-, "two" and πρόσωπον, prósopon [neuter], "face", "person"; with Latin ending), also known as craniofacial duplication (cranio- from Greek κρανίον, "skull", the other parts Latin), is an extremely rare congenital disorder whereby parts (accessories) or all of the face are duplicated on the head.

== Development ==
Although classically considered conjoined twinning (which it resembles), diprosopus is not normally due to the fusion or incomplete separation of two embryos. It is the result of abnormal activity by the protein SHH (sonic hedgehog).

SHH and its corresponding genes have been found to play an important role in signaling craniofacial patterning during embryonic development. Among other things, SHH governs the width of facial features. In excess it leads to widening of facial features and to duplication of facial structures. The greater the widening, the more structures are duplicated, often in a mirror image form. This has been demonstrated in the laboratory by introducing pellets of the SHH protein into chicken embryos, resulting in chickens with duplicate beaks. Inadequate amounts of that protein lead to opposite conditions such as cyclopia where facial features are insufficiently developed.

Healthy brain development is also dependent on the signaling function of SHH. During embryonic development, SHH directs embryonic cells to organize in specific areas that later become specialized neural tissues, thus controlling the size and shape of brain structures.

== Occurrences ==
Diprosopus often occurs in combination with other congenital disorders, particularly anencephaly, neural tube defect and cardiac malformations. When present, the brain may show abnormalities ranging from partial to complete duplication of brain structures, and/or underdevelopment of brain tissues.

=== Humans ===
Most human infants with diprosopus are stillborn. Known instances of humans with diprosopus surviving for longer than minutes to hours past birth are very rare; only a few are recorded. In 2002 and 2003, two living male infants with partial diprosopus were described in the medical literature in separate case reports. One infant was born with duplication of the nose and the cerebral frontal lobes, two widely spaced eyes, a small, underdeveloped central eye socket, and a large, asymmetric mouth. The other infant was born with duplication of the upper and lower jaw, two tongues arising from the same base, cleft palate, a slightly divided tip of the nose, and two widely spaced eyes, as well as absence of the corpus callosum, duplication of the pituitary gland and stalk, and abnormalities in the midbrain. Because they were born with a milder, partial form of diprosopus, both infants were considered candidates for surgical correction of their abnormal facial features.

==== Spanish case ====
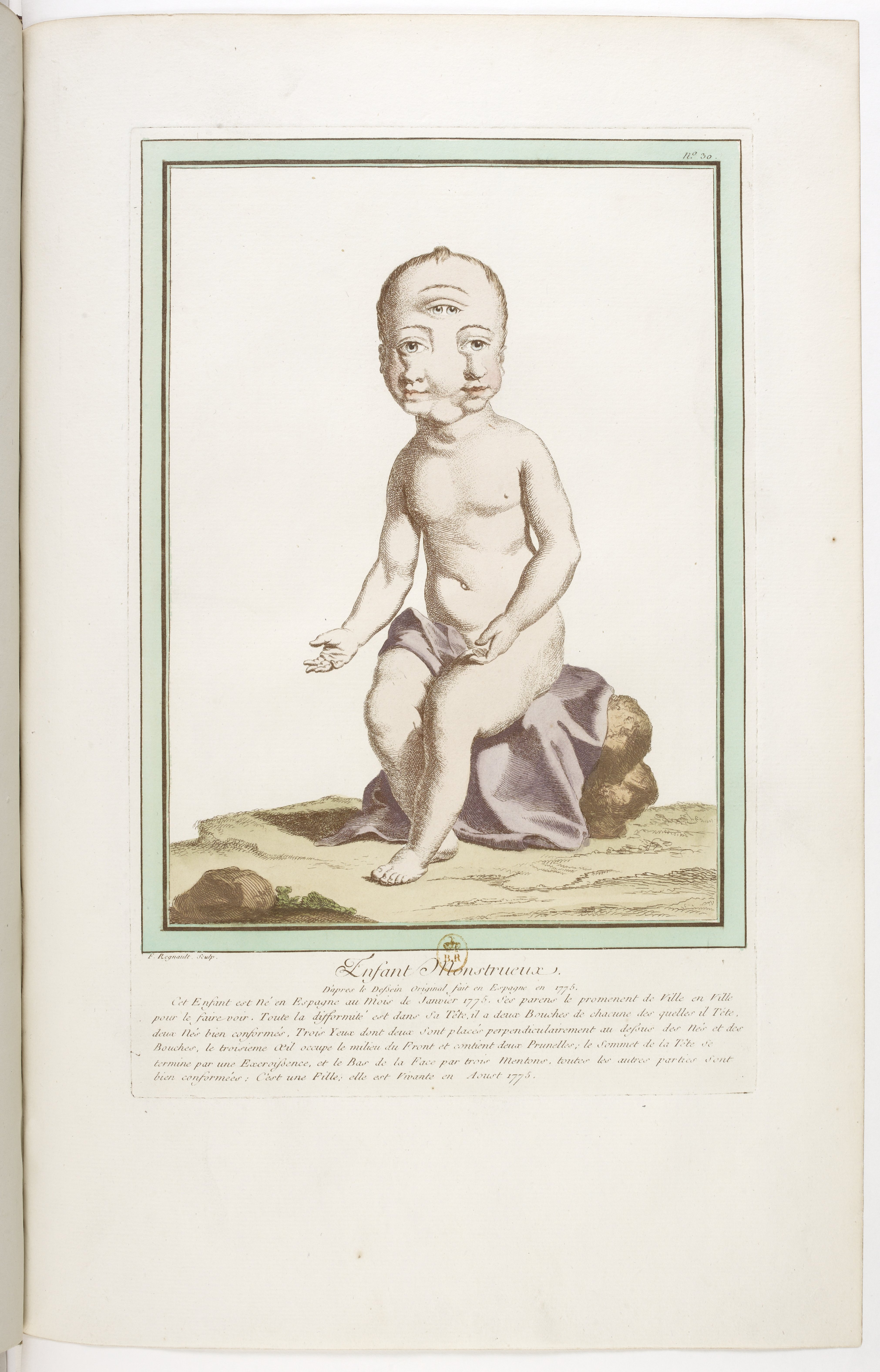
Spanish case of diprosopus, born 1775

In January 1775, a Spanish family gave birth to a girl with diprosopus. She had 3 eyes (one a combination of 2), 2 noses, 2 mouths, and 3 chins. The child was taken on tour from village to village, and gained much attention in Spain and neighboring countries. Her case is mentioned in Nicolas-François and Geneviève Regnault's Les écarts de la nature, published that year. Her full lifespan is unknown, but is mentioned to still be alive in French publications as late as 1777.

==== Tres Johnson ====
Tres Johnson was born on March 4, 2004, in Missouri, to Brandy and Joshua Johnson. Facebook posts suggest that Tres died on September 9, 2025. He had a large cleft, two separate nostrils, and a head with an unusual shape. He also had cognitive delays and seizures. He was not expected to live more than a few hours, but he defied the odds and celebrated his 18th birthday in 2022.

Tres underwent several surgeries to repair his cleft and reduce his seizures. He took medication to control his epilepsy and attended a special school. He enjoyed playing video games, listening to music, and spending time with his family and friends. He had a Facebook pageand an Instagram account where he shared his journey with diprosopus and epilepsy.

==== Lali Singh ====
Lali Singh was born in March 2008 in Saini, a village near Delhi, and was one of the very few infants with diprosopus to survive well past birth. She may have been the only known baby to survive with complete facial duplication. Her facial features included two pairs of eyes, two noses, and two mouths. She was seen as the reincarnation of the goddess Durga, who is sometimes depicted with many limbs and eyes.

Her parents declined an offer from local doctors to evaluate their daughter through CT or MRI scanning. Without diagnostic imaging, it was not possible to know the full extent to which the child's condition might have affected her brain and other vital structures in her head and neck. Thus, any estimation of her ability to thrive or even survive could be only speculative, though Lali's family described her as functioning normally. It is also unknown whether neurosurgeons or craniofacial surgeons, if consulted, would have had feasible solutions to offer with respect to corrective surgery. A local doctor told reporters that she should be considered a healthy child who currently was living a normal life, a previously unknown occurrence for a baby with diprosopus. The baby was born in hospital, but when she began to suffer infection and dehydration because her cleft palate impaired her ability to swallow, readmission to hospital was delayed by discussion among her extended family and her village's headman. When her parents took her back to hospital, she started to improve, but died of a heart attack at the age of two months.

==== Faith and Hope Howie ====
Faith Daisy and Hope Alice Howie (8–27 May 2014) were born in Sydney, Australia, to parents Simon Howie and Renee Young. Faith and Hope shared one body and skull, but had complete duplication of the facial features, as well as duplication of the brain; both brains joined to one brain stem. Young and Howie had learned at nineteen weeks gestation of their children's condition, but opted not to terminate the pregnancy. The children were born six weeks prematurely and appeared to be doing well, able to breathe unaided several days after their birth, and they were observed to sleep and cry at different times. They died nineteen days following their birth due to unknown causes, although some sources indicated that the girls died following an operation for unknown reasons.

=== Other animals ===
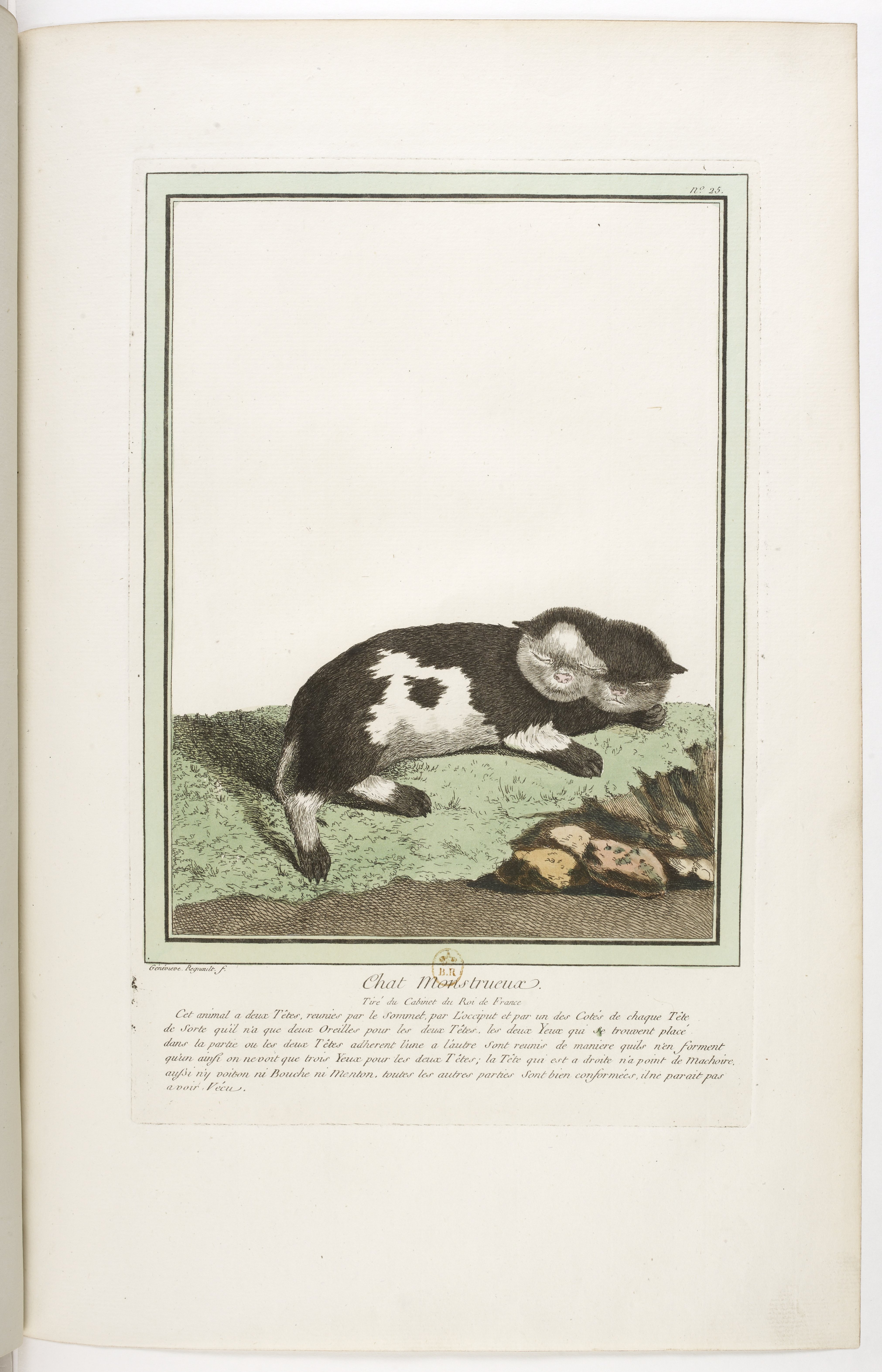
An example of a "Janus cat"

Janus, a goat with two faces on one body, survived from April 5 to May 5, 2020 in Wittenberg, Wisconsin. Few two-faced animals have survived due to associated internal organ abnormalities and brain abnormalities. One of the most famous was Ditto, a pig. Ditto was raised to adulthood, but died of pneumonia caused by food inhalation when breathing through one muzzle while eating with the other.

Cats with the condition are known as 'Janus cats', after the Roman god. In July 2006, a six-year-old male Janus cat called "Frank and Louie" from Millbury, Massachusetts, USA, received publicity. In their case, only one esophagus (and possibly only one trachea) were functional; this aided survival. In September 2011, when Frank and Louie were twelve years old, it was announced that they would appear in the 2012 Guinness Book of World Records as the longest-surviving Janus cat on record. In 2014, Frank and Louie died at the age of fifteen. In July 2026, a kitten with two noses and two mouths was born in Llangedwyn, Wales.

== See also ==
- Conjoined twins
- Craniopagus parasiticus
- Cyclopia
- Durga, a three-eyed Hindu goddess
- Edward Mordake, a disputed story of a 19th-century man with a face on the back of his head
- Futakuchi-onna, a female Japanese yōkai with mouth on back of her head/hair
- Janus, a Roman god with two faces
- Kara Mia, a Philippine TV series that tells the story of a young woman with two faces divided in one body.
- Polycephaly
