= Pasqual Piñón =

Mexican sideshow performer (1889–1929)

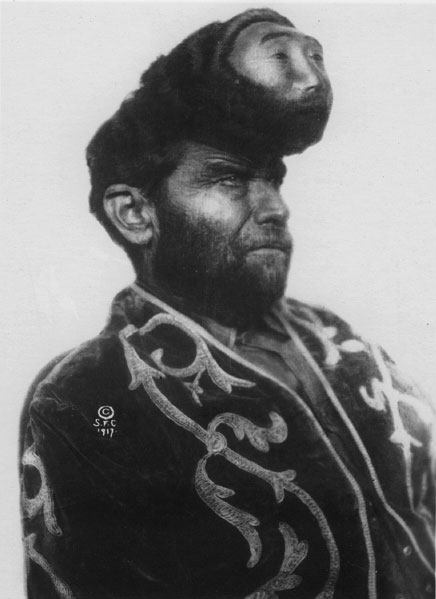
- Piñón in 1917
- Born: 1889
- Died: 1929 (39–40 years old)
- Other names: Pedro The Two-Headed Mexican; Pascual Piñón
- Occupations: Circus performer Railroad worker
- Employer: Sells-Floto Circus
- Known for: Cranial deformation

Pasqual Piñón (1889–1929), known as Pedro The Two-Headed Mexican, or Pascual Piñón, was a performer with the Sells-Floto Circus in the early 1900s.

== Career ==
Piñón was born in 1889 and worked as a railroad worker in Texas. He was later discovered by a sideshow promoter whose attention had been caught by a large benign cyst or tumor at the top of his head.

The promoter drafted Piñón into his freak show and had a fake face made of wax to place onto the growth, allowing the claim that Piñón had two heads. Some reports state that it was made of silver and surgically placed under the skin.

While it is possible for a person to have two heads, the condition craniopagus parasiticus, a form of conjoined twins, sees one head upside-down on top of the other. Piñón's second head was oriented like his actual head.

== Medical condition ==
Piñón had a large benign growth on the top of his head, described in published accounts as either a cyst or a tumor. Located on the crown of his head, the growth later became the basis of his sideshow career.

Accounts differ on the precise nature of the growth, but it has consistently been described as benign. After leaving the circus, Piñón reportedly had the growth removed at the expense of his manager before returning to Texas.

== Death ==
Piñón died in 1929.

== Legacy ==
The novels Downfall and The Book about Blanche and Marie by Per Olov Enquist feature Piñón, though they portray the story as factual and, in the latter book, make the second head female.

The short fictional story My Pet Trilobite by Kristin Harley, published in Ricky's Back Yard – Cult issue (vol. 1, no. 1), features Piñón, narrated by the other head who is in physical and political conflict with him.

== See also ==
- Edward Mordake
