= Ohio State University Health Sciences Center for Global Health =

Collaborative university program

Coordinates: 39.994159°N 83.016833°W

Health Sciences Center for Global Health John A Prior Health Sciences Library 376 W 10th Ave, Suite 165 Columbus, OH 43210-1280

The Health Sciences Center for Global Health (HSCGH) at The Ohio State University (OSU) is a collaborative program among the OSU Colleges of Dentistry, Medicine, Nursing, Optometry, Pharmacy, Public Health, School of Health and Rehabilitation Sciences and Veterinary Medicine. The HSCGH is led jointly by the Colleges of Medicine (COM) and Public Health (CPH).

The HSCGH was created to increase student interest in global careers, prepare students for those careers and to promote, develop and coordinate interdisciplinary global health education and research throughout the health sciences colleges and the larger community. The Board of Trustees approved the creation of the HSCGH in July 2007.

The National Institutes of Health (NIH) Fogarty Framework Grant was awarded to OSU in September 2008. The NIH John E. Fogarty International Center grant supports the creation of new, multidisciplinary educational programs as well as an administrative infrastructure to support activities.

== Core Activities ==
- Creation of an administrative framework to coordinate and accelerate global health activities at OSU.
- Development of robust multidisciplinary curricula in global health at the college-preparatory, undergraduate, graduate, and postdoctoral levels for students and trainees enrolled at OSU.
- Creation of an Interdisciplinary Specialization in Global Health within the Graduate School.
- Development of mentored hands-on research, outreach and clinical experience in global health.

== Graduate Interdisciplinary Specialization in Global Health ==
The Graduate Interdisciplinary Specialization in Global Health (GISGH) is a university-wide program that offers current OSU graduate and professional students advanced educational opportunities in the field of global health. The goal of the GISGH is to help prepare graduates to be active participants in the advancement of global health through academic enrichment, service-learning, and research pertaining to issues of global health. The specialization's core course, Introduction to Global Health, focuses on the basic components of population health, while the electives allow students to pursue topics across the other health sciences colleges for a truly interdisciplinary experience.
