= Elaine Schuster =

American philanthropist and diplomat (1932–2022)

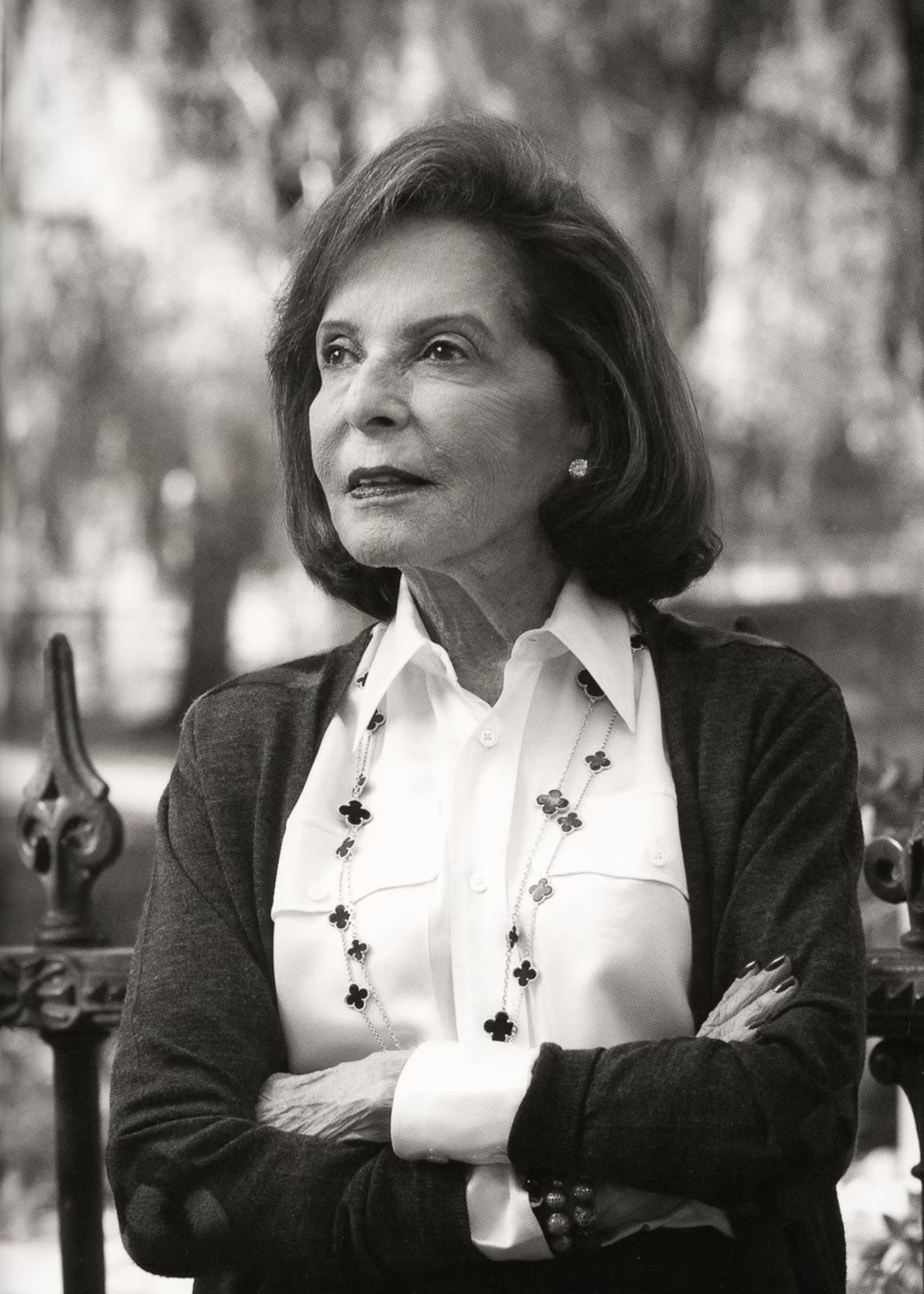
Schuster photographed by Bill Brett

Elaine M. Schuster (April 5, 1932 – August 1, 2022) was an American philanthropist, diplomat, civic leader, and Democratic Party activist.

== Public service ==
For the 64th UN session (2009–2010), President Barack Obama appointed Schuster to serve as a Public Delegate to the United Nations General Assembly. Schuster focused her work for the U.N. in the area of human trafficking.

== Philanthropy ==
In 2004, she and her husband, Gerald, founded The Elaine and Gerald Schuster Institute for Investigative Journalism at Brandeis University. Along with her husband, Schuster founded a community-based network center, called PEACE (Partnerships in Education and Community Enrichment). She also led the Schuster Family Foundation’s efforts to establish a Transplant Center as well as a Surgical Suite named for them at Brigham and Women's Hospital.

== Awards and honors ==
Schuster and her husband received the Heritage Society Award from the Brigham & Women’s Hospital. She had been honored by Franciscan Children’s Hospital. In 2011, Schuster was honored by the Big Sister Association of Greater Boston. In 2013, Schuster was awarded an Honorary Doctorate degree from Brandeis University for her commitment to education, health care and human rights. She was also named by Boston Magazine as one of 100 Women who Run Boston.

== Political activism ==
Schuster was active in Democratic politics on both the state and national level. She served as Finance Chair to Senator John Kerry, as National Advisory Board member and the New England Chair for Hillary Clinton’s Presidential Campaign and as Chair of the Democratic National Committee’s Women’s Leadership Forum. Prior to her death, the Massachusetts State Democratic Party honored her for her work on behalf of Democratic values.

== Personal life ==
Schuster was born on April 5, 1932. She was married to the late Gerald Schuster, the President of Continental Wingate Company Inc. Schuster lived in Boston, Massachusetts, Osterville, Massachusetts, and Palm Beach, Florida.

== Death ==
Schuster died on August 1, 2022, at the age of 90. Attorney General Maura Healey said of Schuster, "Elaine was in a league of her own in terms of her giving, her philanthropy, her engagement in politics, and her support of women candidates in particular... There’ll never be another Elaine Schuster." Former US Secretary of State John Kerry called her "a towering force of nature."
