= Samuel O. Thier =

American doctor and academic (1937–2026)

- Born: June 23, 1937; New York City, U.S.
- Died: January 3, 2026 (aged 88)
- Education: Cornell University (BS); State University of New York Upstate Medical University (MD)
- Scientific career
- Fields: Medicine, Health Care Policy
- Workplaces: Harvard University

Samuel Osiah Thier (June 23, 1937 – January 3, 2026) was an American doctor and academic who was professor of Medicine and Health Care Policy at Harvard University. He earned his medical degree at the State University of New York Upstate Medical University in 1960. He previously served as the president of Brandeis University from 1991–1994 and the president of the Massachusetts General Hospital from 1994-96.

Thier was an authority on internal medicine and kidney disease and was also known for his expertise in national health policy, medical education and biomedical research.

== Early life and education ==
Thier was born in Brooklyn, New York City, on June 23, 1937. He attended Cornell University, and then earned a Doctor of Medicine degree in 1960 from the State University of New York Upstate Medical Center at Syracuse. In addition, he received sixteen honorary degrees and the UC Medal of the University of California, San Francisco.

== Career ==
Thier began his career at the Massachusetts General Hospital, progressing from Intern in 1960, to Chief Resident in Medicine in 1966, to Assistant in Medicine and Chief of the Renal Unit in 1967.

He served as Associate Director of Medical Services at the Hospital of the University of Pennsylvania and then Vice Chairman of the Department of Medicine at the University's School of Medicine.

In 1975, he became Chairman of the Department of Internal Medicine at Yale University School of Medicine, where he was the Sterling Professor, and Chief of Medical Service at Yale-New Haven Hospital.

Thier served as President of the Institute of Medicine, United States National Academies, from 1985 to 1991.

He was the President of Brandeis University from 1991 to 1994. At Brandeis, he was largely credited with improving the financial situation of the institution.

Thier was the President of Massachusetts General Hospital and taught at both Massachusetts General Hospital and Brigham and Women's Hospital.

=== Partners HealthCare ===
In 1994 Thier became president of the newly formed Partners HealthCare, founded by Brigham and Women's Hospital (BWH) and Massachusetts General Hospital (MGH). From 1996 to 2002 he was CEO of Partners HealthCare. Thier led Partners' efforts to demand higher payments from insurance companies. In May 2000 Thier and William C. Van Faasen, CEO of Blue Cross Blue Shield of Massachusetts—the state's biggest health insurer—agreed to a deal that raised insurance costs all across Massachusetts. They agreed that Van Faasen would substantially increase insurance payments to Partners HealthCare doctors and hospitals, largely correcting the underpayments of the previous 10 years. Prior to this, Thier had informed all three managed care companies that they would all be paid at the same rate.

== Boards ==
Thier had many leadership positions, including membership on the Board of Trustees of Yale-New Haven Hospital, Johns Hopkins University, and Cornell University. Thier continued to teach several undergraduate lectures at Brandeis University each semester. In 2007 he served as director of Merck & Company, the Charles River Laboratories, The Commonwealth Fund and the Federal Reserve Bank of Boston. In 2014, Thier received from Merck alone $605,306.23.

== Death ==
Thier died on January 3, 2026, at the age of 88.

== Awards and honors ==
Thier was named Honorary Fellow of the New York Academy of Medicine, and was a Fellow of the American Academy of Arts and Sciences and a member of the American Philosophical Society. He received the John Stearns Medal for Distinguished Contributions in Medicine from the New York Academy of Medicine in 2005.

== See also ==
- Brandeis University
