= Leonard Bernstein Festival of the Creative Arts =

The Leonard Bernstein Festival of the Creative Arts is an annual event that was started in 1952 by Leonard Bernstein who was both a composer and a Brandeis University faculty member. It is sponsored by Brandeis University's Office of the Arts.

Its founding in 1952 was held at the graduation of the first graduating class and included the world premier of Bernstein's opera Trouble in Tahiti.

Its philosophy is that "the art of an era is a reflection of the society in which it is produced, and through creative endeavors the thoughts and expression which characterize each generation are revealed and transformed."

As of 2026, the festival is scheduled to include a 24-hour student-led performance series titled "ART NEVER SLEEPS".
