= The Brandeis Hoot =

School newspaper of Brandeis University

- "To acquire wisdom, one must observe."
- Type: Weekly newspaper
- Founder(s): Leslie Pazan, Igor Pedan and Daniel Silverman
- Editor-in-chief: Jenna Lewis
- Founded: 2005
- Headquarters: Waltham, Massachusetts
- Circulation: 500
- Website: brandeishoot.com

The Brandeis Hoot, or simply, The Hoot, is the community newspaper serving the Brandeis University campus. Founded in 2005 by Leslie Pazan, Igor Pedan, and Daniel Silverman, it features articles written for, by and about the members of the Brandeis community. The paper's current Editor-in-Chief is Jenna Lewis. Doubling in size since its inception, The Hoot is read worldwide and has been cited by national media outlets, including The New York Times, The Boston Globe and NPR. Publishing every other Friday during the semester, The Hoot is distributed throughout the Brandeis community. The paper's motto is "To acquire wisdom, one must observe." The Hoot publishes five sections (News, Arts, Opinions [formerly Impressions], Features, and Sports) and an editorial each week. The Hoot also publishes a "Hoot Recommends" in each issue, an article in which editors give their opinions on a new topic.

The Hoot transitioned from a traditional newspaper into a news magazine at the beginning of the 2025-26 school year. This change was led by Editor-in-Chief Jenna Lewis.

== History ==
The Hoot was formed in 2004, when a group of editors at The Justice left because they felt that The Justice was not accurately representing the views of the Brandeis community.
