= S Katharine Hammond =

American public health researcher

S. Katharine Hammond
- Education: Oberlin College (BSc); Brandeis University (PhD)
- Scientific career
- Workplaces: Wheaton College; University of Massachusetts Medical School; UC Berkeley School of Public Health.
- Thesis: Kinetics and mechanism of the reactions of molybdate and tungstate with catechol derivatives (1975)

Sally Katharine Hammond is a professor of Environmental Health Sciences and Associate Dean of Academic Affairs at the UC Berkeley School of Public Health. Her research considers the impact of pollution and passive smoking on public health. It resulted in the Federal Aviation Administration issuing a ban on smoking on aeroplanes. Hammond serves on the World Health Organization study group on Tobacco Product Regulation.

== Early life and education ==
Hammond was born in Philadelphia and grew up in both Kansas City, Missouri and Lima, Ohio. She learned to play clarinet whilst she was at grade school, eventually moving to the bassoon as a teenager. During high school she commuted to Columbus, Ohio to take monthly bassoon lessons at Ohio State University. After trying to decide between music and science, Hammond eventually studied chemistry at Oberlin College and graduated in 1971. She completed her doctoral research at Brandeis University, where she investigated the reactions of molybdate and tungstate with derivatives of catechol. After earning her doctorate, Hammond was recruited to the faculty at Wheaton College. When it became clear that she would not achieve tenure for several years, Hammond retrained in environmental health sciences at the Harvard T. H. Chan School of Public Health where she earned a master's degree in 1981. She continued to work at the Harvard T. H. Chan School of Public Health, starting her own research in industrial health and hygiene. She joined the faculty at the University of Massachusetts Medical School in 1985.

== Research and career ==
In the 1980s Hammond demonstrated a device to monitor the health impacts of passive smoking. The device monitored the diffusion of nicotine to a filter treated with sodium bisulfite. The nitrogen is desorbed from the filters and subsequently analysed using gas chromatography. She demonstrated that non-smokers working in the same room as smokers were exposed to the same amount of carcinogen benzene as smokers inhale in six cigarettes. She provided expert testimony before the Occupational Safety and Health Administration. Her research and reporting to the Federal government of the United States resulted in the Federal Aviation Administration issuing a ban on smoking on aeroplanes. She indicated that a smoking ban in correctional facilities significantly improved the health of non-smoking prisoners by reducing their exposure to secondhand smoke. She also showed pregnant women who smoke transfer carcinogens through the placenta to their unborn children, increasing their risk factors for different cancers. Whilst in Massachusetts, Hammond encouraged parents to monitor their children's exposure to secondhand smoke, and used their findings as a means to motivate parents to stop smoking.

Alongside her research program into the impacts of first and secondhand smoke, Hammond studied how industry employees were impacted by their work environments. She showed that in the semiconductor industry, women working with certain solvents were 40 – 90% more likely to have spontaneous abortions than the general population. Her research informed several health policies to improve health and safety within research and development facilities.

In 1995 she moved from the University of Massachusetts Medical School to join the UC Berkeley School of Public Health. At Berkeley Hammond leads the national Children's Health and Air Pollution study, which looks to understand and minimise the risks of air pollution on children's health in Fresno, California. Fresno has been identified as one of the eight most polluted cities in the United States. Her work showed that there is a direct link between pollution and children's immune systems; and that polycyclic aromatic hydrocarbon impacted Regulatory T cell function. She has looked at whether air pollution impacts the risk of premature birth and birth defects, whether air pollution causes allergies, how it impacts metabolism and obesity and how transit patterns impact foetus development in pregnant women. Amongst her research programs, she studies the impact of lead on the levels of lead in construction worker's blood and the impact of agrochemicals on the health of farmers. She has shown that smoking Hookah can be as damaging to the lungs as the smoking cigarettes.

=== Selected publications ===
- Marr, Linsey C.; Kirchstetter, Thomas W.; Harley, Robert A.; Miguel, Antonio H.; Hering, Susanne V.; Hammond, S. Katharine (1999). "Characterization of Polycyclic Aromatic Hydrocarbons in Motor Vehicle Fuels and Exhaust Emissions". Environmental Science & Technology. 33 (18): 3091–3099. Bibcode:1999EnST...33.3091M. doi:10.1021/es981227l. ISSN 0013-936X.
- Hammond, S. Katharine.; Leaderer, Brian P. (1987). "A diffusion monitor to measure exposure to passive smoking". Environmental Science & Technology. 21 (5): 494–497. Bibcode:1987EnST...21..494H. doi:10.1021/es00159a012. ISSN 0013-936X. PMID 22296139.
- Emmons, K. M.; Hammond, S. K.; Fava, J. L.; Velicer, W. F.; Evans, J. L.; Monroe, A. D. (2001-07-01). "A Randomized Trial to Reduce Passive Smoke Exposure in Low-Income Households With Young Children". Pediatrics. 108 (1): 18–24. doi:10.1542/peds.108.1.18. ISSN 0031-4005. PMID 11433049.

She serves on the World Health Organization study group on Tobacco Product Regulation.

== Personal life ==
Hammond plays bassoon in the Prometheus Symphony Orchestra.
