= Brandeis University =

Private university in Waltham, Massachusetts, US

- Motto: Hebrew: אמת, romanized: Emet (Truth)
- Motto in English: "Truth even unto its innermost parts"
- Type: Private research university
- Established: October 20, 1948; 78 years ago
- Accreditation: NECHE
- Academic affiliations: AAU; NAICU
- Endowment: $1.36 billion (2025)
- President: Arthur E. Levine
- Provost: Linda Bui
- Faculty: 512 (2024)
- Administrative staff: 1,342 (2024)
- Students: 4,696 (fall 2025)
- Undergraduates: 3,342 (fall 2025)
- Postgraduates: 1,354 (fall 2025)
- Location: Waltham, Massachusetts, United States; 42.365664°N 71.259742°W
- Campus: 235 acres (95 ha); Small city
- Newspaper: The Brandeis Hoot; The Justice
- Colors: Blue
- Nickname: Judges
- Sporting affiliations: NCAA Division III – UAA; ECAC; NEISA
- Mascots: The Judge and Ollie the Owl (named for Justice Oliver Wendell Holmes Jr.)
- Website: www.brandeis.edu

Brandeis University (/ˈbrændaɪs/) is a private research university in Waltham, Massachusetts, United States. It is located in the Greater Boston area. Founded in 1948 as a non-sectarian, coeducational university, Brandeis was established on the site of the former Middlesex University. It is named after Louis Brandeis, the first Jewish justice of the U.S. Supreme Court.

Brandeis is classified among "R1: Doctoral Universities – Very high research activity" and is accredited by the New England Commission of Higher Education. The university has been a member of the Association of American Universities (AAU) since 1985. In 2018, it had a total enrollment of 5,820 students on a campus of 235 acres (95 hectares).

Alumni and faculty of the university have included Nobel Prize laureates Drew Weissman, Michael Rosbash, Jeffrey C. Hall, and Roderick MacKinnon; Fields Medalist Edward Witten; Turing Award winners Leslie Lamport and Charles H. Bennett; Abel Prize winner Karen Uhlenbeck; and co-creators of the television show Friends, David Crane and Marta Kauffman.

== History ==
=== Founding ===
Coat of arms of the former Middlesex University

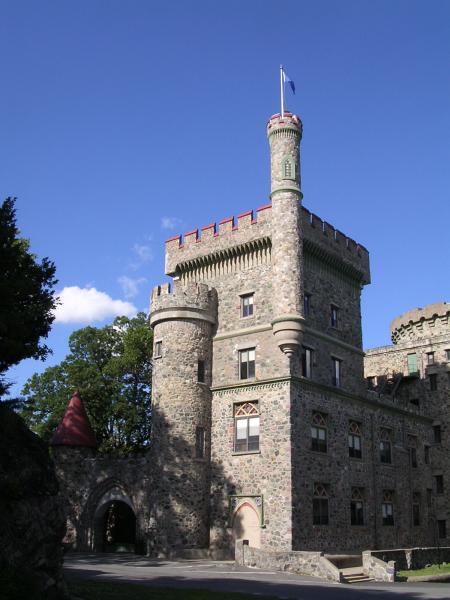
Usen Castle, a building on campus

Middlesex University was a medical school located in Waltham, Massachusetts, that was at the time the only medical school in Massachusetts that did not impose a quota on Jews. The founder, John Hall Smith, died in 1944. Smith's will stipulated that the school should go to any group willing to use it to establish a non-sectarian university. Within two years, Middlesex University was on the brink of financial collapse. The school had not been able to secure accreditation by the American Medical Association, which Smith partially attributed to institutional antisemitism in the American Medical Association.

Smith's son, C. Ruggles Smith, was desperate for a way to save something of Middlesex University. He learned of a New York committee headed by Israel Goldstein that was seeking a campus to establish a Jewish-sponsored secular university. Smith approached Goldstein with a proposal to give the Middlesex campus and charter to Goldstein's committee, in the hope that his committee might "possess the apparent ability to reestablish the School of Medicine on an approved basis". While Goldstein was concerned about being saddled with a failing medical school, he was excited about the opportunity to secure a 100-acre (40-hectare) "campus not far from New York, the premier Jewish community in the world, and only 9 miles (14 km) from Boston, one of the important Jewish population centers." Goldstein agreed to accept Smith's offer, proceeding to recruit George Alpert, a Boston lawyer with fundraising experience as national co-chairman of the United Jewish Appeal.

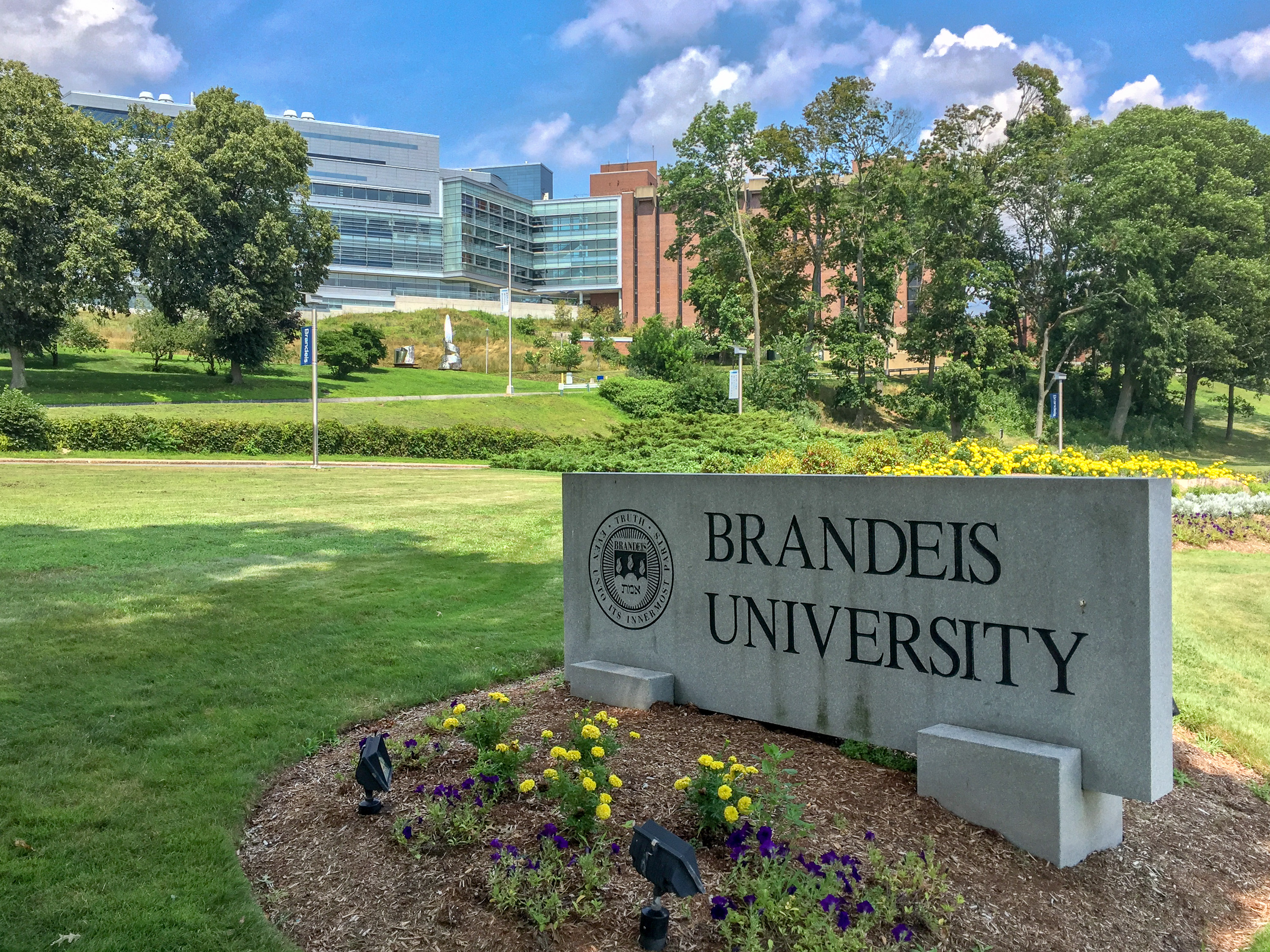
Brandeis University sign

Alpert had worked his way through Boston University School of Law and co-founded the firm of Alpert and Alpert. Alpert's firm had a long association with the New York, New Haven and Hartford Railroad, of which he was to become president from 1956 to 1961. He was chairman of Brandeis from 1946 to 1954, and a trustee from 1946 until his death.

By February 5, 1946, Goldstein had recruited Albert Einstein, whose involvement drew national attention to the nascent university. Einstein believed the university would attract the best young people in all fields, satisfying a real need. In March 1946, Goldstein said the foundation had raised $10 million that it would use to open the school by the following year. The foundation purchased Middlesex University's land and buildings for two million dollars. The charter of this operation was transferred to the foundation along with the campus. The founding organization was announced in August and named The Albert Einstein Foundation for Higher Learning, Inc. The new school would be a Jewish-sponsored secular university open to students and faculty of all races and religions.

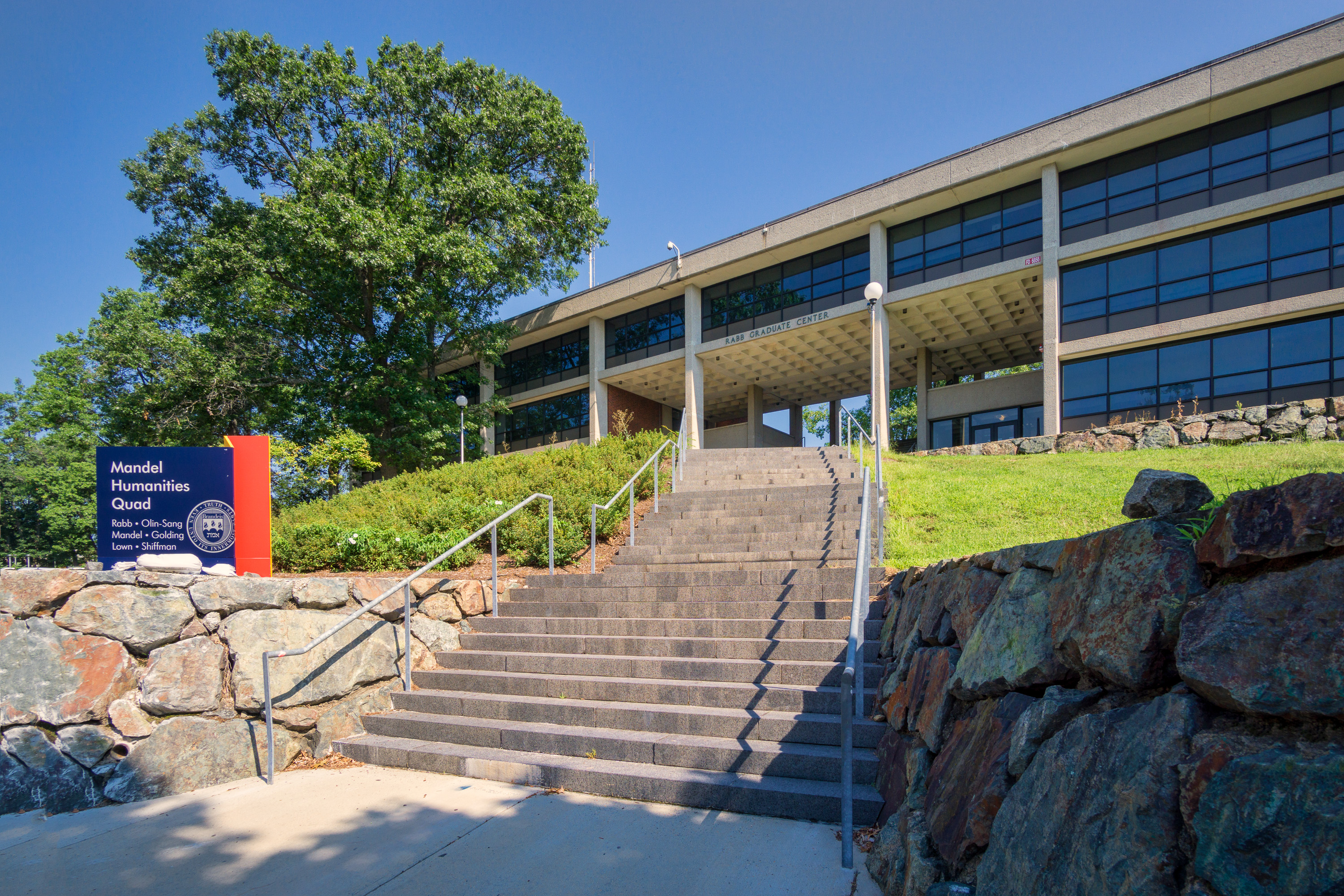
Rabb Graduate Center (1965, Benjamin Thompson)

The trustees offered to name the university after Einstein in the summer of 1946, but Einstein declined, and on July 16, 1946, the board decided the university would be named after Louis Brandeis. Einstein threatened to sever ties with the foundation on September 2, 1946, over disputes with Rabbi Israel Goldstein, a board member, with whom Einstein disagreed. Believing the venture could not succeed without Einstein, Goldstein quickly agreed to resign, and Einstein recanted. Einstein's near-departure was publicly denied. Goldstein said that, despite his resignation, he would continue to solicit donations for the foundation.

On November 1, 1946, the foundation announced that the new university would be named Brandeis University, after Louis D. Brandeis, associate justice of the United States Supreme Court. By the end of 1946, the foundation said it had raised over five hundred thousand dollars, and two months later it said it had doubled that amount.

The Brandeis board felt it was in no position to make the investment in the medical school that would enable it to receive accreditation, and closed it in 1947. Einstein wanted Middlesex University's veterinary school's standards to be improved before expanding to the school, while others in the foundation wanted to simply close the veterinary school, which, by the winter of 1947, had an enrollment of just about 100 students. A professional study of the veterinary school recommended dismissing certain instructors and requiring end-of-year examinations for the students, but the foundation declined to enact any of the recommendations, to the dismay of Einstein and a couple of the foundation's trustees.

In early June 1947, Einstein made a final break with the foundation. The veterinary school was closed, despite students' protests and demonstrations. According to George Alpert, a lawyer responsible for much of the organizational effort, Einstein had wanted to offer the presidency of the school to left-wing scholar Harold Laski, someone that Alpert had characterized as "a man utterly alien to American principles of democracy, tarred with the Communist brush." He said, "I can compromise on any subject but one: that one is Americanism." Two of the foundation's trustees, S. Ralph Lazrus and Otto Nathan, quit the foundation at the same time as Einstein. In response, Alpert said that Lazrus and Nathan had tried to give Brandeis University a "radical, political orientation." Alpert also criticized Lazrus' lack of fundraising success and Nathan's failure to organize an educational advisory committee. Einstein said he, Lazrus, and Nathan "have always been and have always acted in complete harmony."

=== Opening ===
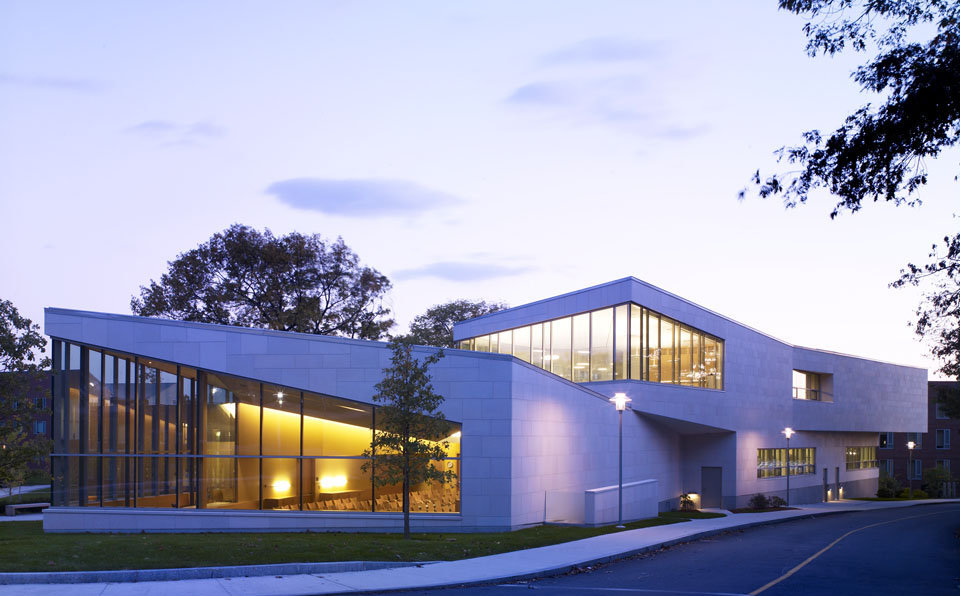
Brandeis's admissions building at night

On April 26, 1948, Brandeis University announced that Abram L. Sachar, chairman of the National Hillel Commission, had been chosen as Brandeis' first president. Sachar promised that Brandeis University would follow Louis Brandeis' principles of academic integrity and service. He also promised that students and faculty would never be chosen based on quotas of "genetic or ethnic or economic distribution" because choices based on quotas "are based on the assumption that there are standard population strains, on the belief that the ideal American must look and act like an eighteenth-century Puritan, that the melting pot of America must mold all who live here into such a pattern." Students who applied to the school were not asked their race, religion, or ancestry.

Brandeis decided its undergraduate instruction would not be organized with traditional departments or divisions, and instead it would have four schools, namely the School of General Studies, the School of Social Studies, the School of Humanities, and the School of Science. On October 14, 1948, Brandeis University received its first freshman class of 107 students. They were taught by thirteen instructors in eight buildings on a 100-acre (40-hectare) campus. Students came from 28 states and six foreign countries. The library was formerly a barn, students slept in the former medical school building and two army barracks, and the cafeteria was where the medical school had stored cadavers. Historians Elinor and Robert Slater later called the opening of Brandeis one of the great moments in Jewish history.

=== Early years ===
Eleanor Roosevelt joined the board of trustees in 1949. Joseph M. Proskauer joined the board in 1950. Construction of on-campus dormitories began in March 1950 with the goal of ninety percent of students living on campus.

Construction on an athletic field began in May 1950. Brandeis' football team played its first game on September 30, 1950, a road win against Maine Maritime Academy. Its first varsity game was on September 29, 1951, with a home loss against the University of New Hampshire. Its first varsity win was a score of 24–13, an away game at Hofstra University on October 6, 1951.

Brandeis Stadium opened in time for a home win against American International College on October 13, 1951. During its first season, the football team won four and lost four games during the regular season and then lost to the University of Tampa in a post-season game. Construction of a 2,000-seat amphitheater began in February 1952.

The state legislature of Massachusetts authorized Brandeis to award master's degrees, doctorate degrees, and honorary degrees in 1951. Brandeis' first graduating class of 101 students received degrees on June 16, 1952. Leonard Bernstein, director of Brandeis' Center of Creative Arts, planned a four-day ceremony to commemorate the occasion. Held in the newly opened amphitheater, the ceremony included the world premier of Bernstein's opera Trouble in Tahiti. Eleanor Roosevelt and Massachusetts governor Paul A. Dever spoke at the commencement ceremony.

In 1953, Einstein declined the offer of an honorary degree from Brandeis, writing to Brandeis President Abram L. Sachar that "what happened in the stage of preparation of Brandeis University was not at all caused by a misunderstanding and cannot be made good any more." Instead, at the graduation ceremony for Brandeis' second graduating class of 108 students, individuals given Brandeis' first honorary degrees included Illinois senator Paul H. Douglas, Rabbi Louis Ginzberg, and Alpert.

1953 also saw the creation of the Department of Near Eastern and Judaic Studies, one of the first academic programs in Jewish Studies at an American university. Among the founders were distinguished emigre scholars Alexander Altmann, Nathan Glatzer, and Simon Rawidowicz. Brandeis' graduate program, the Graduate School of Arts and Sciences, opened in fall 1954. In the same year, Brandeis became fully accredited, joining the New England Association of Colleges and Secondary Schools. As of 1954, Brandeis had 22 buildings and a 192-acre (78-hectare) campus.

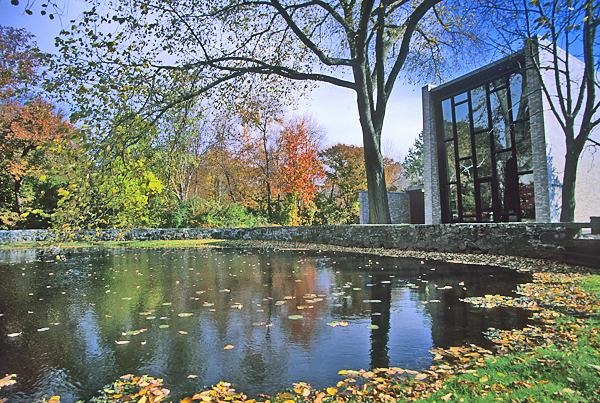
Chapels Pond

In 1954, Brandeis began construction on an interfaith center consisting of separate Roman Catholic, Protestant, and Jewish chapels. Designed by the architectural firm of Harrison & Abramovitz, the three chapels surrounded a natural pond. Brandeis announced that no official chaplains would be named, and attendance at chapel services would not be required.

The Roman Catholic chapel was named Bethlehem, meaning house of bread, and it was dedicated on September 9, 1955. Dedicated on September 11, 1955, the Jewish chapel was named in memory of Mendel and Leah Berlin, parents of Boston surgeon David D. Berlin. Named in memory of Supreme Court Justice John Marshall Harlan, the Protestant chapel was dedicated on October 30, 1955.

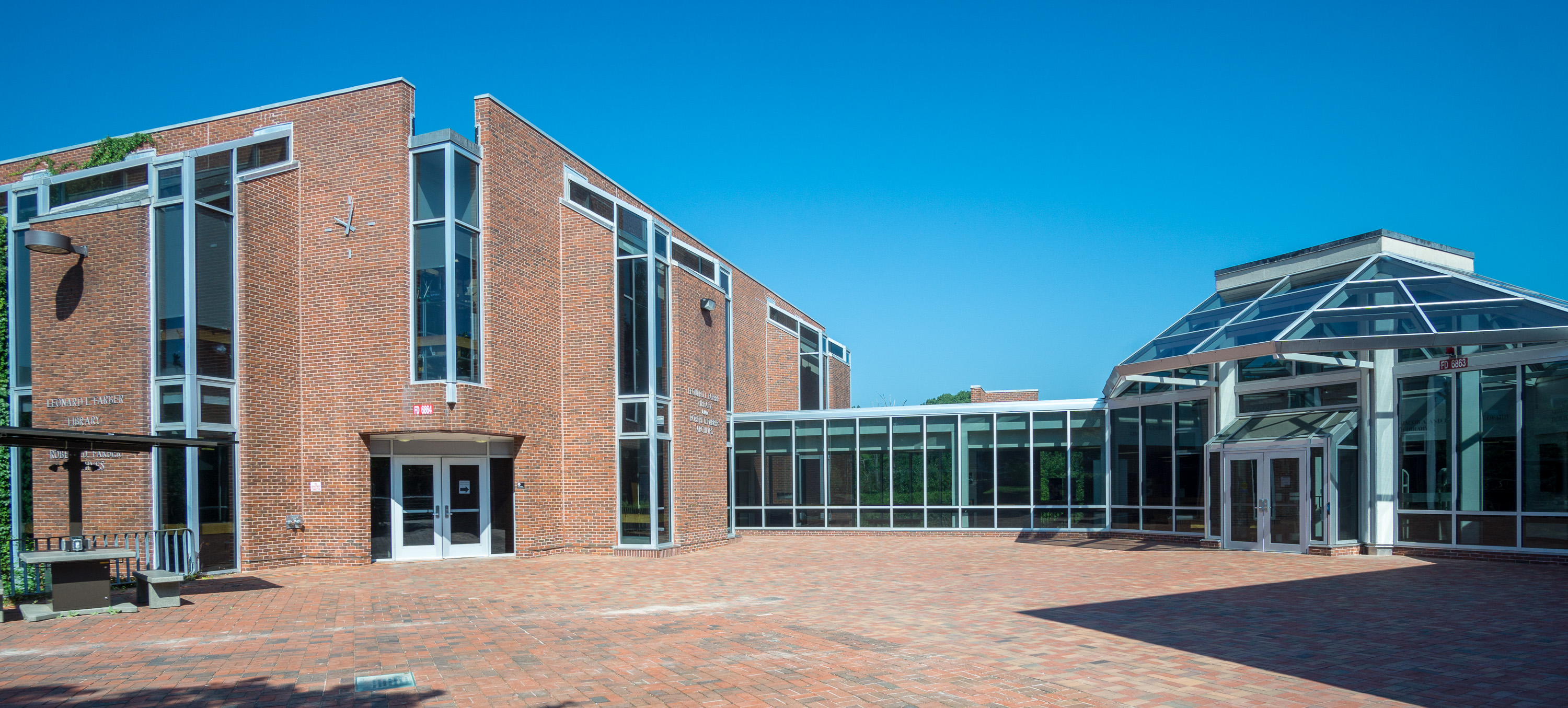
Farber Library at left (1984, Abramovitz, Harris, & Kingsland); Goldfarb Library at right (1959, Harrison & Abramovitz)

In 1956, Brandeis received a one-million-dollar donation from New York industrialist Jack A. Goldfarb to build a library. The building, named the Bertha and Jacob Goldfarb Library in his honor, was designed by Harrison & Abramovitz, a firm which designed many campus buildings in the 1950s. Built of brick and glass, the library was designed to hold 750,000 volumes.

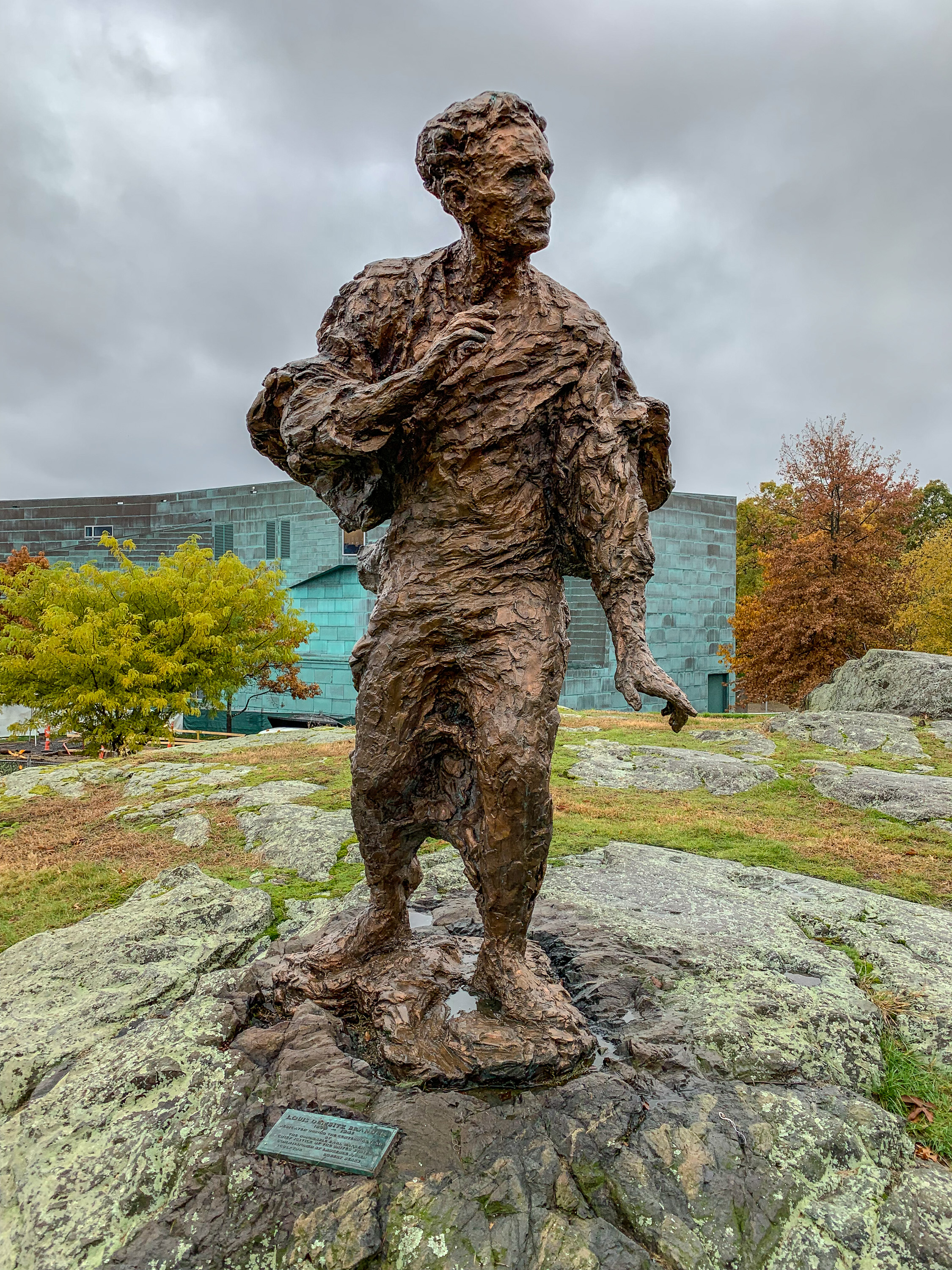
Robert Berks' statue of Louis Brandeis stands atop the outcropping in Fellows Garden, in the center of campus (1956).

A nine-foot bronze statue of Justice Louis D. Brandeis is a campus landmark. The sculpture, created by sculptor Robert Berks, was unveiled in 1956 in honor of the 100th anniversary of Brandeis' birth. Berks' wife Dorothy had been the Justice's personal assistant for 39 years and wore his actual robes to model the statue.

After Brandeis University awarded an honorary doctorate to Israeli premier David Ben-Gurion in 1960, Jordan boycotted Brandeis University, announcing that it would not issue currency permits to Jordanian students at Brandeis.

Beginning in fall 1959, singer Eddie Fisher established two scholarships at the university, one for classical and one for popular music, in the name of Eddie Cantor.

On May 16, 1960, Brandeis announced it would discontinue its varsity football team. President Abram Sachar pointed to the cost of the team as one reason for the decision. Brandeis' football coach Benny Friedman said it was difficult to recruit football players who were also excellent students with so much competition in the Boston metropolitan area.

Brandeis said the discontinuation of varsity football would allow it to expand intercollegiate activity in other sports. During its nine years of varsity play, Brandeis' football team recorded 34 wins, 33 losses, and four ties. In 1985, Brandeis was elected to membership in the Association of American Universities, an association that focuses on graduate education and research.

=== 1960s: Countercultural epicenter ===
Brandeis became an epicenter of radical student activism and anti–Vietnam War protests during the counterculture of the 1960s. It was the National Student Strike Information Center during the student strike of 1970.

==== Student takeover of Ford Hall ====
On January 8, 1969, about 70 Black students entered the student center, Ford Hall, ejected everyone else from the building, and refused to leave. The students' demands included the hiring of more Black faculty members, increasing Black student enrollment from four percent to ten percent of the student body, an increase in scholarships for Black students, and establishment of an independent department of African American studies. In addition, more than 200 white students staged a sit-in in the lobby of the administration building.

University President Morris B. Abram said that, although he recognized "the deep frustration and anger which black students here and all over the country feel at what must seem—and often is—the indifference and duplicity of white men in relation to blacks", the students' actions were an affront to the university. The faculty condemned the students' actions as well. On the fourth day of the protest, the Middlesex Superior Court issued a temporary restraining order, requiring the students to leave Ford Hall. While Abram did not allow the order to forcibly remove the students from Ford Hall to be enforced, 65 students were suspended for their actions.

On January 18, the black students exited Ford Hall, ending the eleven-day occupation of the building. There had been no violence or destruction of property during the occupation, and Brandeis gave the students amnesty for their actions. Ronald Walters became the first chair of Afro-American studies at Brandeis later the same year. Ford Hall was demolished in August 2000 to make way for the Shapiro Campus Center, which was opened and dedicated October 3, 2002.

=== Late 20th century: Institutional crisis ===
In the late 1970s, Brandeis faced a major financial crisis as donations from American Jews decreased as they turned toward support for Israel and other causes.

Samuel O. Thier, president from 1991 to 1994, helped to restabilize the university.

In 1998, German chancellor Helmut Kohl addressed the university as commencement speaker and dedicated the Center for German and European Studies established the previous year.

=== 21st century ===
In January 2007, former President Jimmy Carter spoke at the university against the backdrop of controversy over his book Palestine: Peace Not Apartheid after being invited by students despite some campus opposition. His speech was followed by a rebuttal remarks from Alan Dershowitz. Later that spring Norman Finkelstein and Daniel Pipes were invited to speak on campus by separate student groups.

In December 2007 former president Bill Clinton spoke on campus and launched the Eli J. Segal Leadership program.

In 2009, the university faced fundraising challenges in part due to donors affected by the Madoff investment scandal and the 2008 financial crisis, leading to the January 2009 announcement that it planned to close the Rose Art Museum and sell the artwork. A university committee later recommended that the museum stay open and the university then said in 2010 it would seek to raise money by lending out the art, and eventually settled a related lawsuit in June 2011 with the museum remaining open.

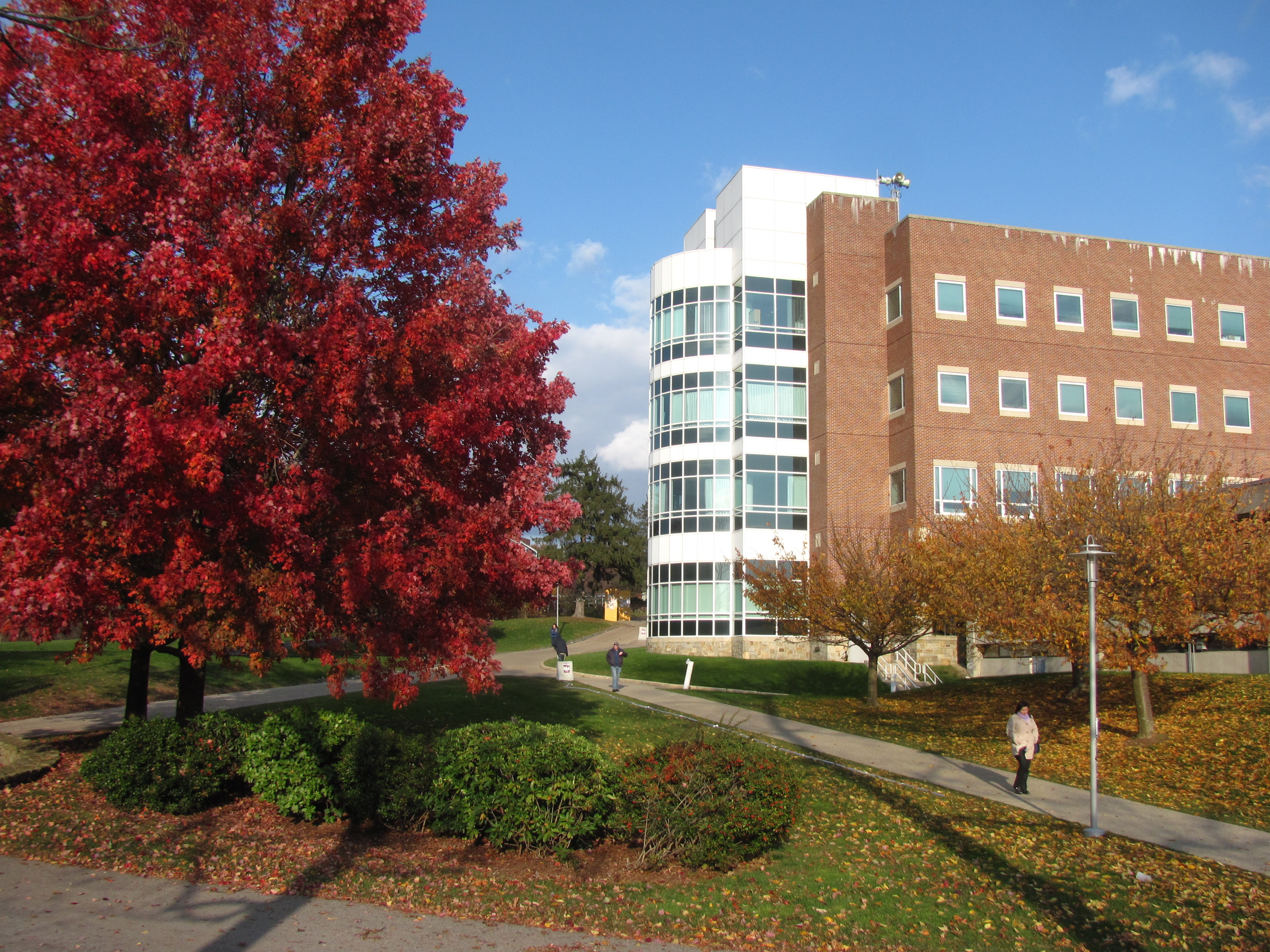
The Volen Center for Complex Systems (1994, CannonDesign)

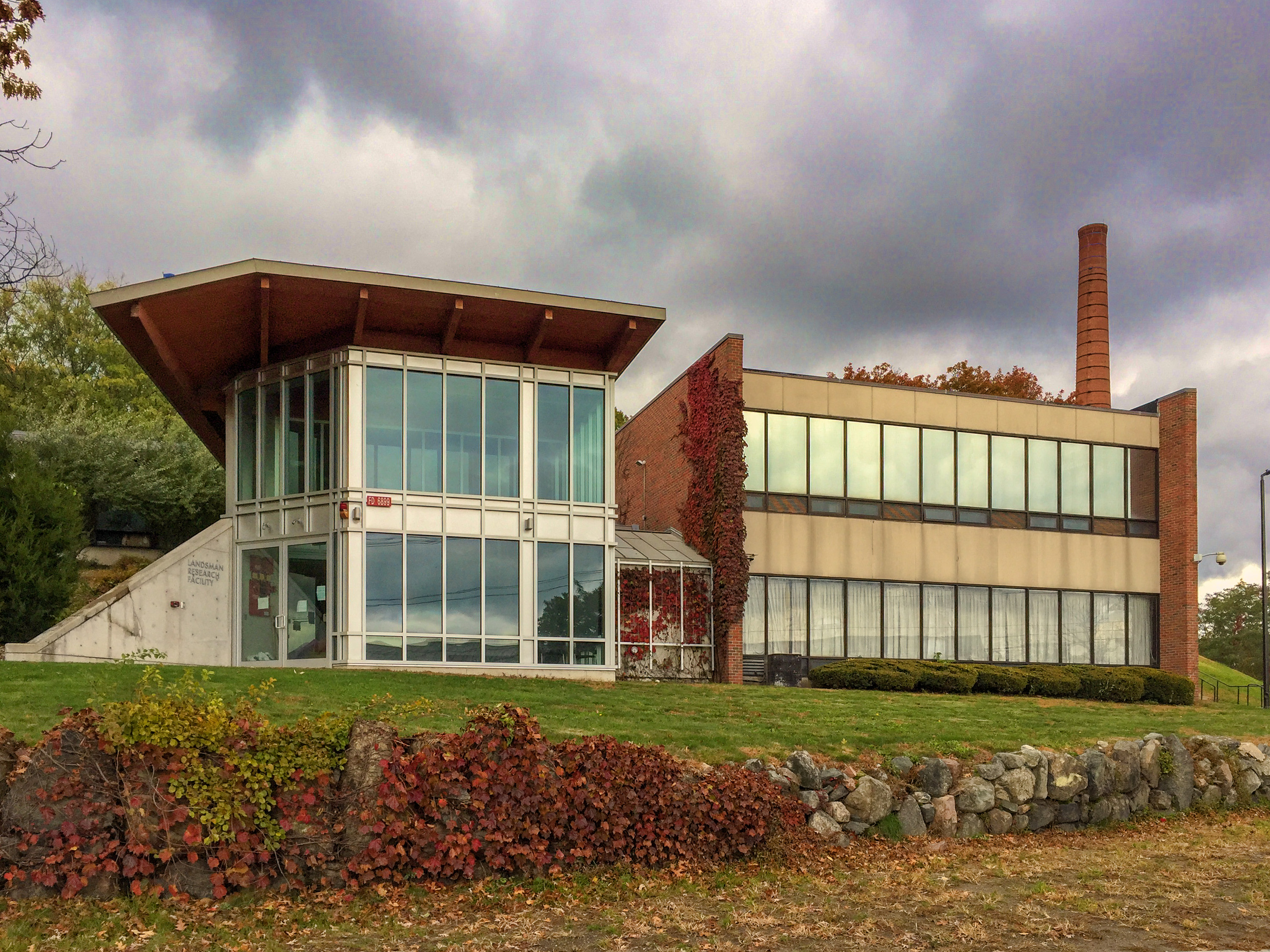
Landsman Research Facility (completed 2005, dedicated 2008), home to a superconducting magnet.

In 2014, Brandeis announced it would offer an honorary doctorate to Ayaan Hirsi Ali, "a staunch supporter of women's rights", and an outspoken campaigner against female genital mutilation, honor killing, and Islamic extremism in general. After complaints from the Council on American–Islamic Relations and internal consultation with faculty and students, Brandeis publicly withdrew the offer, citing that Ali's statements condemning Islam were "inconsistent with the University's core values". 87 out of 511 faculty members at Brandeis signed a letter to the university president. The university announced that the decision to withdraw the invitation was made after a discussion between Ayaan Ali and President Frederick Lawrence, stating that "She is a compelling public figure and advocate for women's rights ... but we cannot overlook certain of her past statements". According to Brandeis, Ali was never invited to speak at commencement, she was only invited to receive an honorary degree. Ali said that Brandeis' decision surprised her because Brandeis said they did not know what she had said in the past even though her speeches were publicly available on the internet, calling it a "feeble excuse". She stated that the university's decision was motivated in part by fear of offending Muslims. She argued that the "spirit of free expression" referred to in the Brandeis statement has been betrayed and stifled. While some commentators such as Abdullah Antepli, the Muslim chaplain and adjunct faculty of Islamic Studies at Duke University, applauded the decision and warned against "making renegades into heroes," other academic commentators such as the University of Chicago's Jerry Coyne and the George Mason University Foundation Professor David Bernstein criticized the decision as an attack on academic values such as freedom of inquiry and intellectual independence from religious pressure groups.

In November 2014, the university ended its partnership with Al-Quds University.

In 2015, a survey released by the university found 27% of undergraduate students had experienced some form of sexual assault, higher than the national average. That year, student journalists covering the "Take Back The Night", an event against sexual assault, were punished by the university for their coverage.

In 2017, a planned student performance of a play called "Buyer Beware" about Lenny Bruce by Brandeis alumnus Michael Weller was first postponed over concerns about racism, then prompting the playwright to withdraw the play in favor of staging it elsewhere.

The university adopted official free expression principles in 2018. A new presidential taskforce to review the university's free expression guidelines was set up in 2024.

In 2021, a student group's "oppressive language list" was removed from the university website after it got outside attention for its suggestion to avoid the term "trigger warning."

In 2023, students protested the university's decision to close the Students for Justice in Palestine chapter. Seven students were arrested.

President Ronald Liebowitz announced his resignation in September 2024 following a faculty no-confidence vote amid budget concerns and controversy over the handling of pro-Palestinian protests on campus. He was the fifth university president to step down that year at least in part in connection with the 2024 pro-Palestinian protests on university campuses, according to the New York Times. In October, the Boston Globe also reported that the university was facing budget challenges connected with lower student enrollments.

In 2026, Bob Kraft donated to the university to create the Robert K. Kraft Family Center for Jewish Life and Leadership.

=== Presidents ===
The presidents of Brandeis University include:

Presidents of Brandeis University
| Name | Tenure | Note |
|---|---|---|
| Abram L. Sachar | 1948–1968 | |
| Morris B. Abram | 1968–1970 | |
| Charles I. Schottland | 1970–1972 | |
| Marver Bernstein | 1972–1983 | |
| Evelyn Handler | 1983–1991 | |
| Stuart Altman | 1990–1991 | interim |
| Samuel O. Thier | 1991–1994 | |
| Jehuda Reinharz | 1994–2010 | |
| Frederick M. Lawrence | 2011–2015 | |
| Lisa M. Lynch | 2015–2016 | interim |
| Ronald D. Liebowitz | 2016–2024 | |
| Arthur E. Levine | 2024– | |

== Campus ==
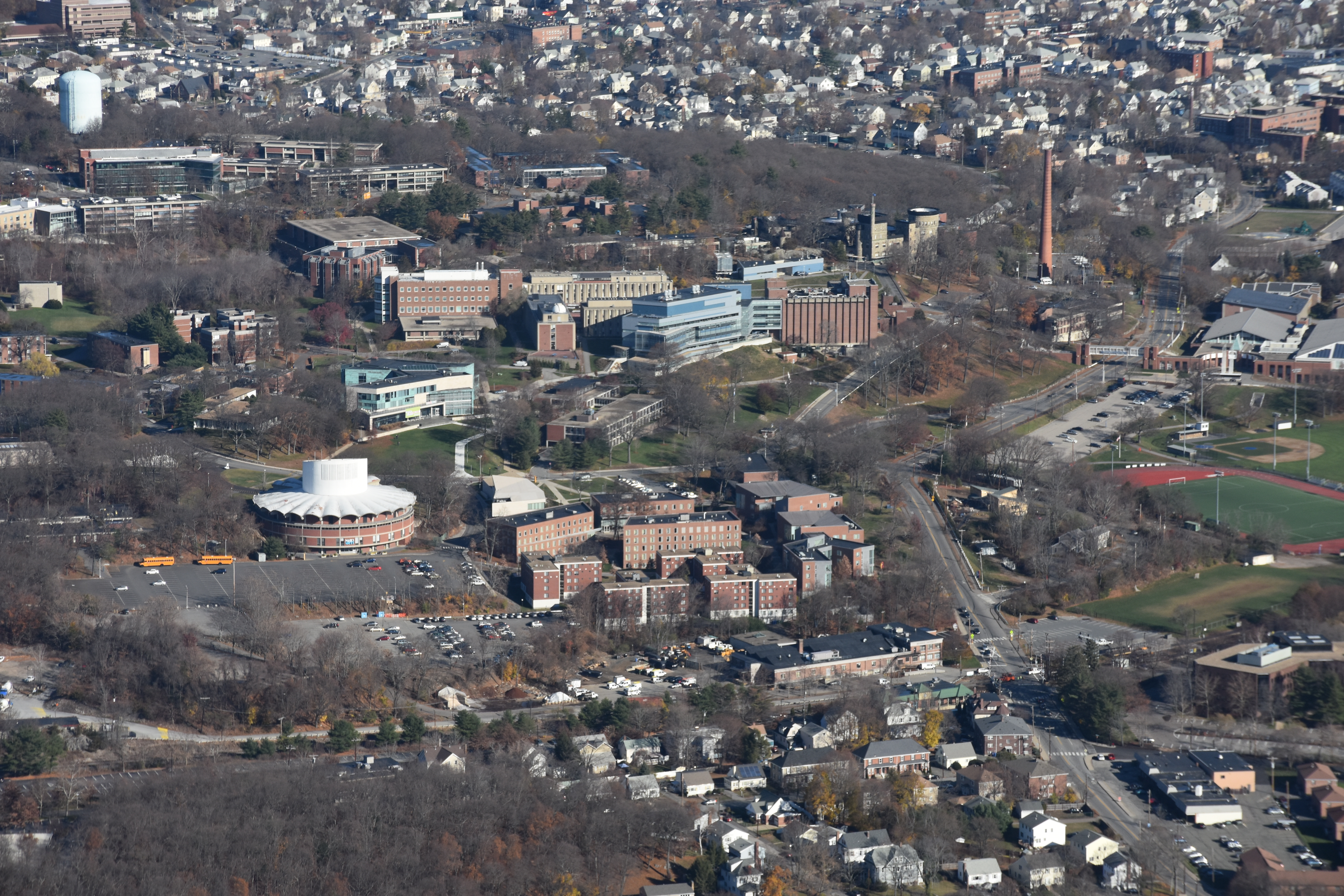
Aerial view of campus in Waltham, Massachusetts

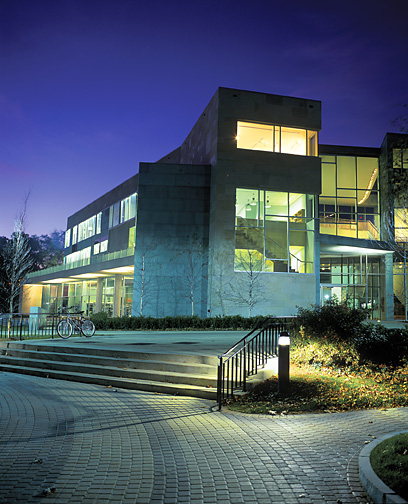
Carl and Ruth Shapiro Campus Center (2002, Charles Rose Architects)

=== The Heller School ===
The Heller School for Social Policy and Management has programs in social policy, health policy and management, and international development.

=== International Business School ===
Brandeis International Business School was established in 1994 as the Graduate School of International Economics and Finance. In 2003, the school changed its name to Brandeis International Business School.

=== The Rabb School of Continuing Studies ===
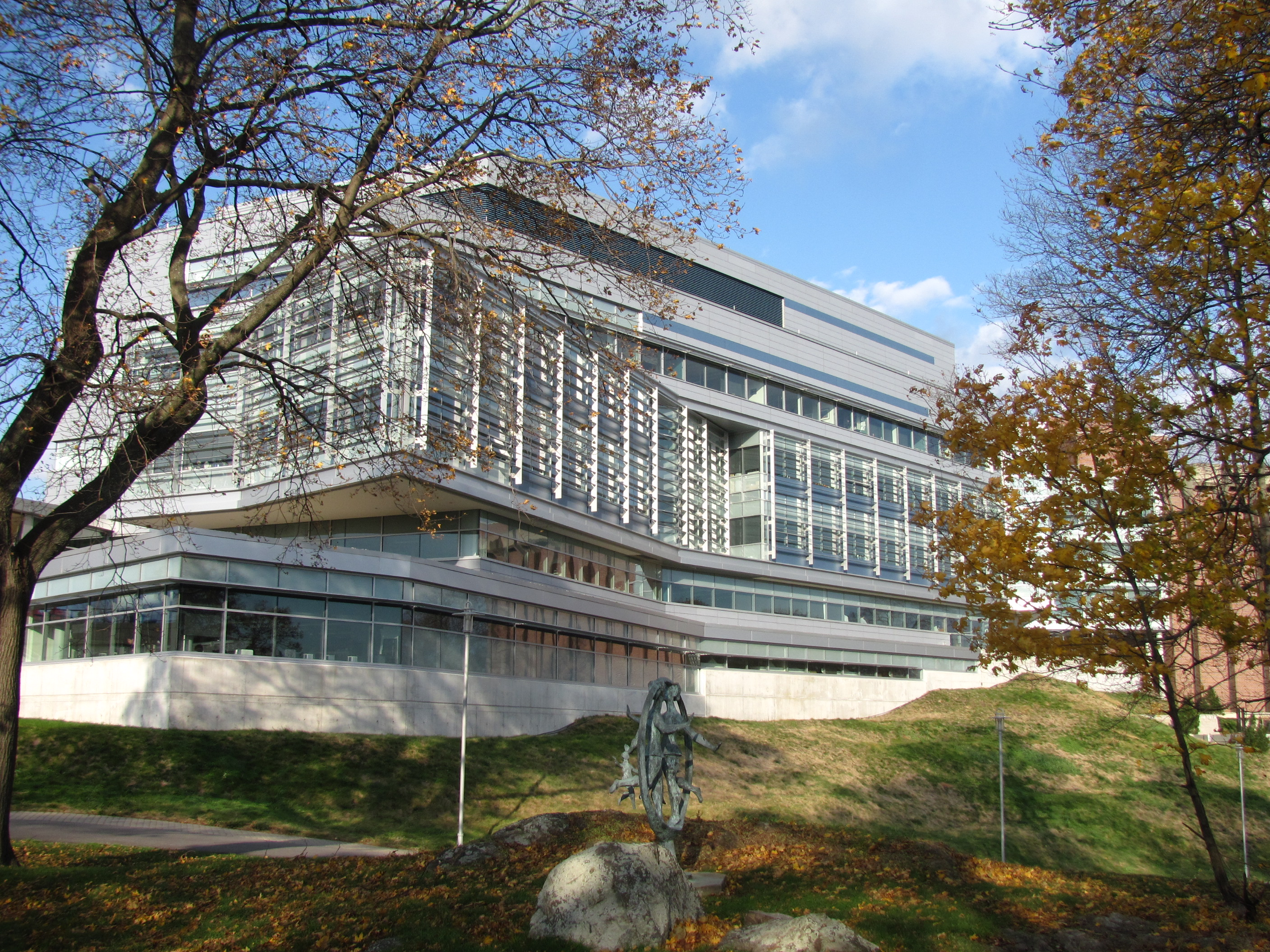
Carl J. Shapiro Science Center (2009, Payette)

With more than 4,000 enrollments a year, the Rabb School of Continuing Studies develops educational offerings across four distinct divisions. It provides professional development opportunities through degree programs, personal enrichment and lifelong learning.

=== Graduate School of Arts and Sciences ===
The Graduate School of Arts and Sciences (GSAS) offers over 40 programs, 18 of which are doctoral programs. Brandeis graduate students are eligible to cross-register for courses at Boston College, Boston University, Tufts University, and the Graduate Consortium in Women's Studies at MIT. Brandeis is also a member of the Boston Library Consortium, composed of 18 academic and research institutions in Massachusetts, Connecticut, Rhode Island, and New Hampshire.

=== Rose Art Museum ===
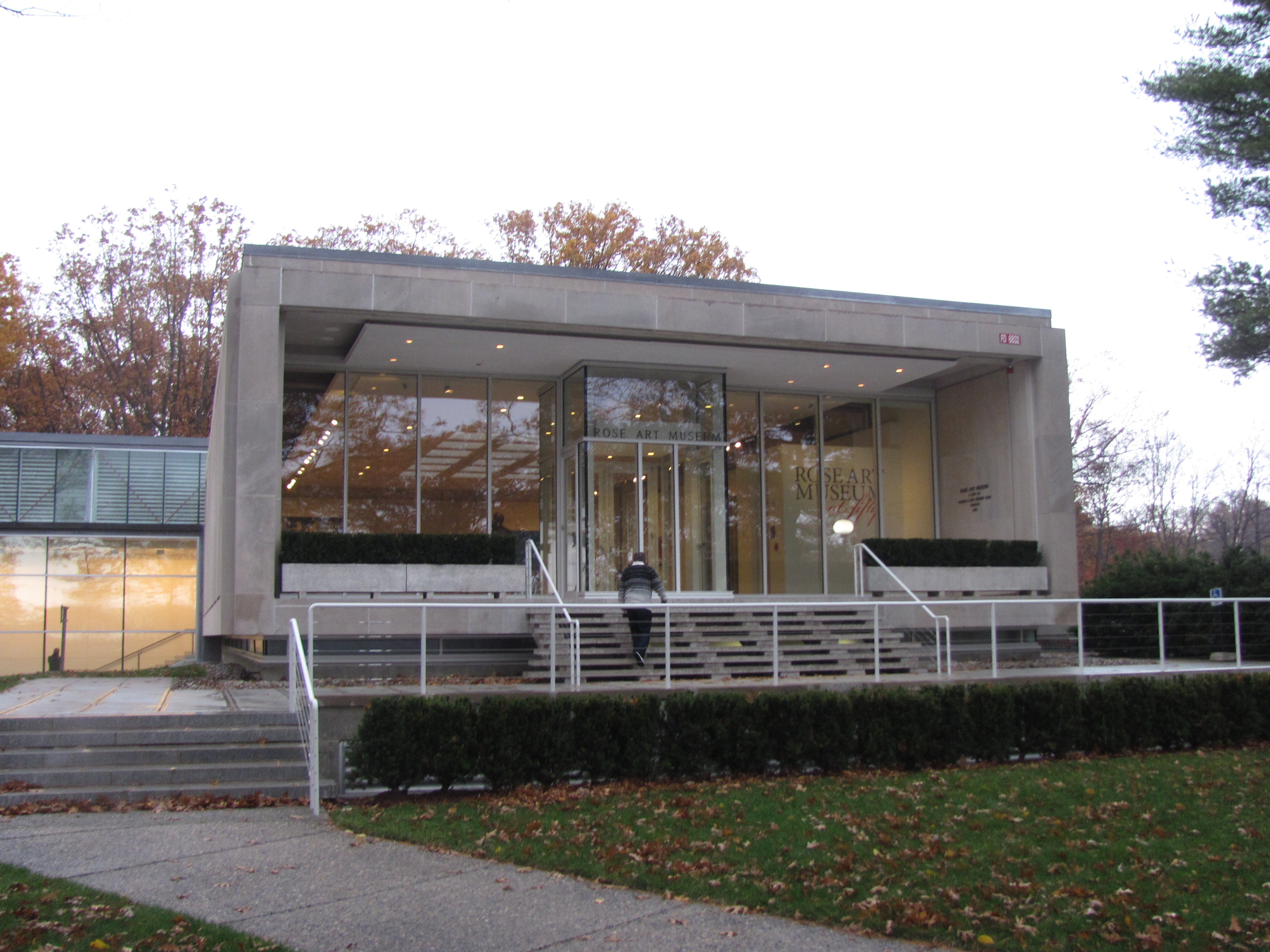
The Rose Art Museum (1961, Harrison & Abramovitz)

Established in 1961, the Rose Art Museum is a museum dedicated to 20th- and 21st-century art.

=== Library ===
The Brandeis Library provides resources and services to support research, scholarship, teaching, and learning on campus.

The library manages more than 1,500,000 physical volumes, and more than 600,000 electronic books, as well as electronic journals and online databases. As part of the library, the Robert D. Farber University Archives & Special Collections Department houses Brandeis University's unique and rare primary sources, which support teaching, research and scholarship at the university and beyond.

The department comprises University Archives, containing materials related to Brandeis University, and Special Collections, including rare books, original manuscripts dating from the 13th to 21st centuries, unique primary source material, and a wide variety of visual material.

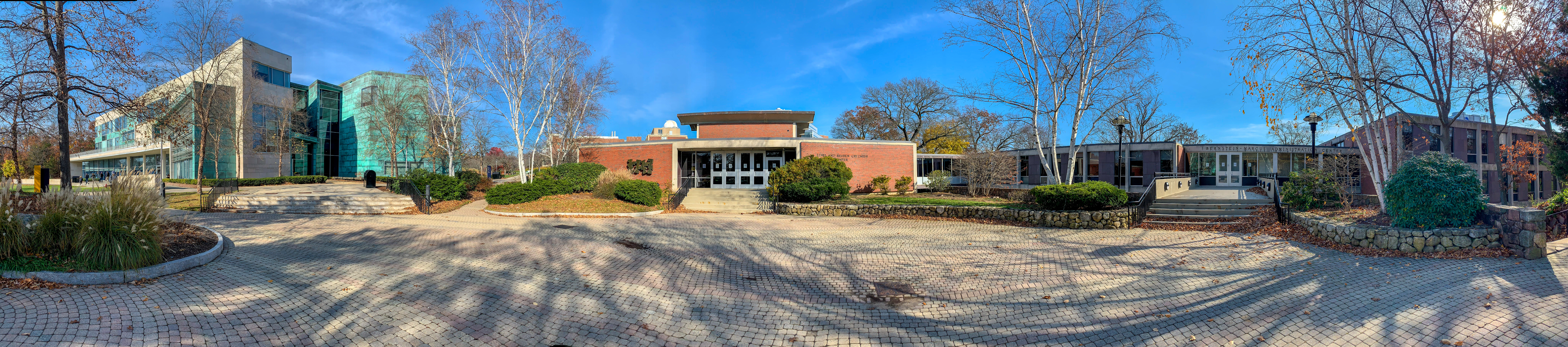
Campus buildings viewed from Starr Plaza, left to right: Shapiro Campus Center, Gryzmish Center, Irving Presidential Enclave, Bernstein-Marcus Administration Center

== Academics ==
The schools of the university include:

- College of Arts and Sciences
- Graduate School of Arts and Sciences
- Heller School for Social Policy and Management
- Rabb School of Summer and Continuing Studies
- Brandeis International Business School

The College of Arts and Sciences comprises 24 departments and 22 interdepartmental programs, which, in total, offer 43 majors and 47 minors.

The Heller School for Social Policy and Management, founded in 1959, has graduate programs in healthcare administration, social policy, and international development. Internships, research assistantships and other hands-on experiences are available throughout the curriculum. The global and experiential dimensions of education at Brandeis are carried out through international centers and institutes, which sponsor lectures and colloquia and add to the ranks of distinguished scholars on campus.

The Brandeis University Press, a member of the University Press of New England, publishes books in a variety of scholarly and general interest fields. The Goldfarb Library at Brandeis has more than 1.6 million volumes and 300,000 e-journals. The library also houses a large United States Government archive. Brandeis University is a part of the Boston Library Consortium, which allows its students, faculty, and staff to access and borrow books and other materials from other BLC institutions including Tufts University and Williams College.

=== Cohen Center for Modern Jewish Studies ===
In 1980, Brandeis University established the Maurice and Marilyn Cohen Center for Modern Jewish Studies, the first academic center devoted to the study of Jewish life in the United States. The Cohen Center's work spans basic research on Jewish identity to applied educational evaluation studies.

The center's recent signature studies include research with participants in Taglit-Birthright Israel, investigations of synagogue transformation, analyses of Jewish summer camping, and socio-demographic studies of Jewish communities throughout the United States. CMJS research has altered the understanding of contemporary Jewish life and the role of Jewish institutions in the United States.

=== Schuster Institute for Investigative Journalism ===
The Schuster Institute for Investigative Journalism was launched in September 2004 as the first investigative reporting center based at a United States university. It was named for founding benefactors Elaine Schuster and Gerald Schuster.

The institute's major projects were:

- the Political & Social Justice Project
- the Justice Brandeis Innocence Project
- the Gender & Justice Project.

The Schuster Institute closed at the end of 2018 due to financial considerations.

=== Steinhardt Social Research Institute ===
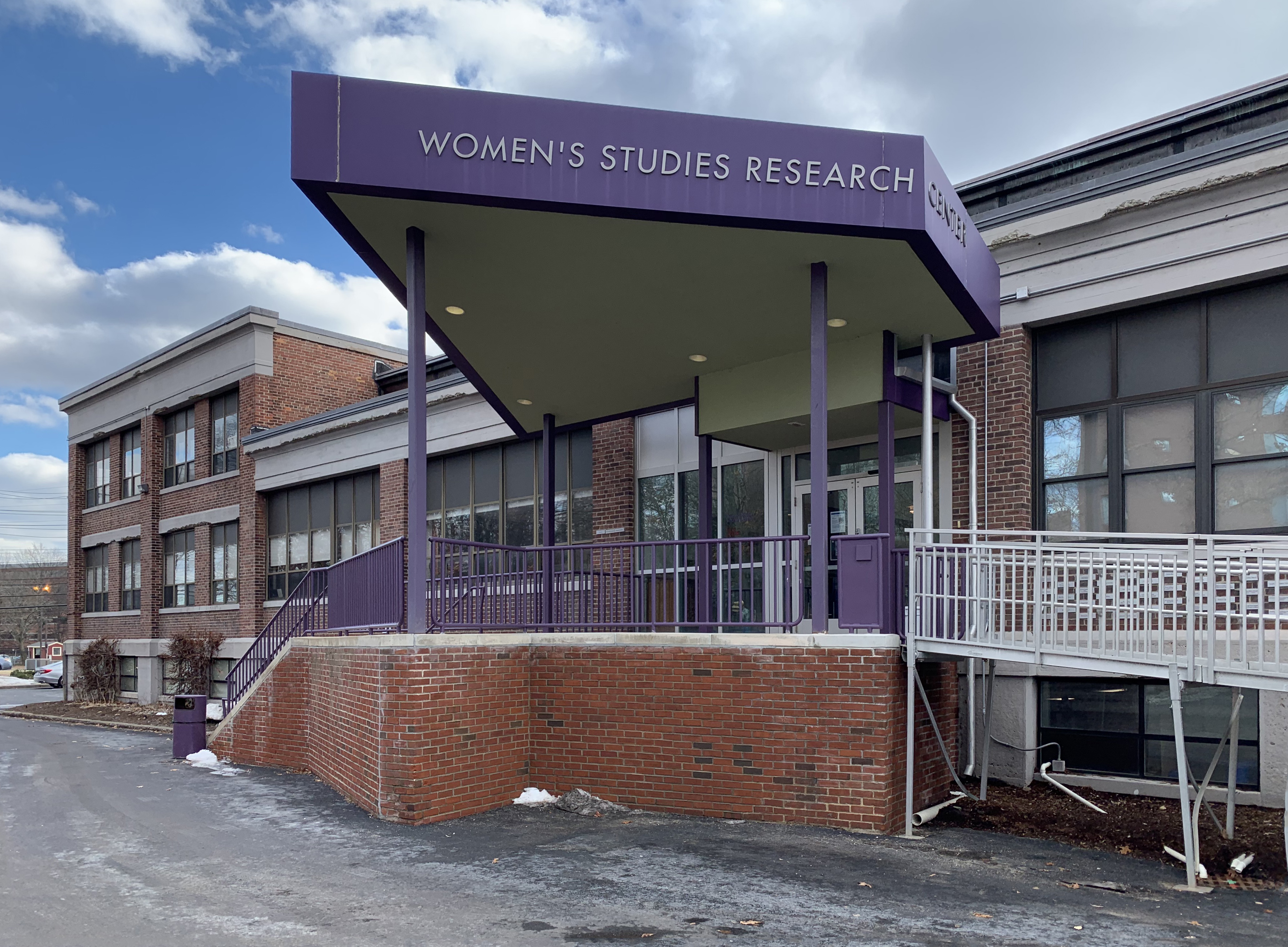
Women's Studies Research Center

The Steinhardt Social Research Institute was created in 2005 from a gift from Michael Steinhardt as a forum to collect, analyze, and disseminate data about the Jewish community and about religion and ethnicity in the United States. The first mission of SSRI was to interpret the inherent problems with the National Jewish Population Survey of 2000 (NJPS). SSRI has done a Jewish Population Survey of the Greater Boston area, the results of which were released on November 9, 2006.

The institute collects and organizes existing socio-demographic data from private, communal, and government sources and will conduct local and national studies of the character of American Jewry and Jewish organizations. The work of the institute is done by a multidisciplinary staff of faculty and scholars, working with undergraduate and graduate students, and augmented by visiting scholars and consultants. The institute works in close collaboration with the Maurice and Marilyn Cohen Center for Modern Jewish Studies.

=== Women's Studies Research Center ===
The WSRC, located in the Epstein Building, was founded in 2001 by Professor Emerita of Sociology Shulamit Reinharz. It is home to three general programs:

- The Scholars Program, which consists of about 70 academic scholars from around the world who study gender through an interdisciplinary lens
- The Student-Scholar Partnership Program, which pairs Brandeis University undergraduate students with WSRC scholars for semester-long, paid research assistantships
- The Arts Program, which oversees the Kniznick Gallery, devoted to feminist artwork

=== Wien International Scholarship ===
The Wien International Scholarship Program was instituted by Brandeis University for international undergraduate students. It was established in 1958 by Lawrence A. and Mae Wien. The family had three objectives: to further international understanding, to provide foreign students an opportunity to study in the United States, and to enrich the intellectual and cultural life at Brandeis.

The Wien Scholarship offers full or partial tuition awards; these awards are need-based and require the applicants to present outstanding academic and personal achievement. Each year, the recipients of the scholarship take a week-long tour of a destination in the United States. In previous years, the students have visited the United Nations in New York City, and did relief work in New Orleans following Hurricane Katrina. In April 2008, the university hosted a three-day-long celebration for the 50th anniversary of the program.

=== Reputation and rankings ===
Academic rankings

National
- Forbes: 117
- U.S. News & World Report: 69
- Washington Monthly: 499
- WSJ/College Pulse: 335

Global
- ARWU: 301–400
- QS: 741-750
- THE: 401-500
- U.S. News & World Report: 664

U.S. News & World Report ranked Brandeis No. 63 in its 2024 annual list of Best National Universities, and Times Higher Education ranked Brandeis No.10 in its "world’s best small universities" category. Acceptance to Brandeis was characterized as "most selective".

Its doctoral program in neuroscience and neurobiology was ranked tied for No. 2 among national universities by the National Research Council in 2010. The Brandeis International Business School was ranked No. 1 by Financial Times from 2010 through 2013 for its Master of Arts in International Economics and Finance Program.

In 2025, the university had a ranking of 231 of 257 top colleges in a free speech ranking conducted by the Foundation for Individual Rights and Expression and College Pulse, after ranking at 148 in 2024 and at 125 in 2022/2023.

The university received an A on the "Campus Antisemitism Report Card" from the Anti-Defamation League in 2024 and 2025.

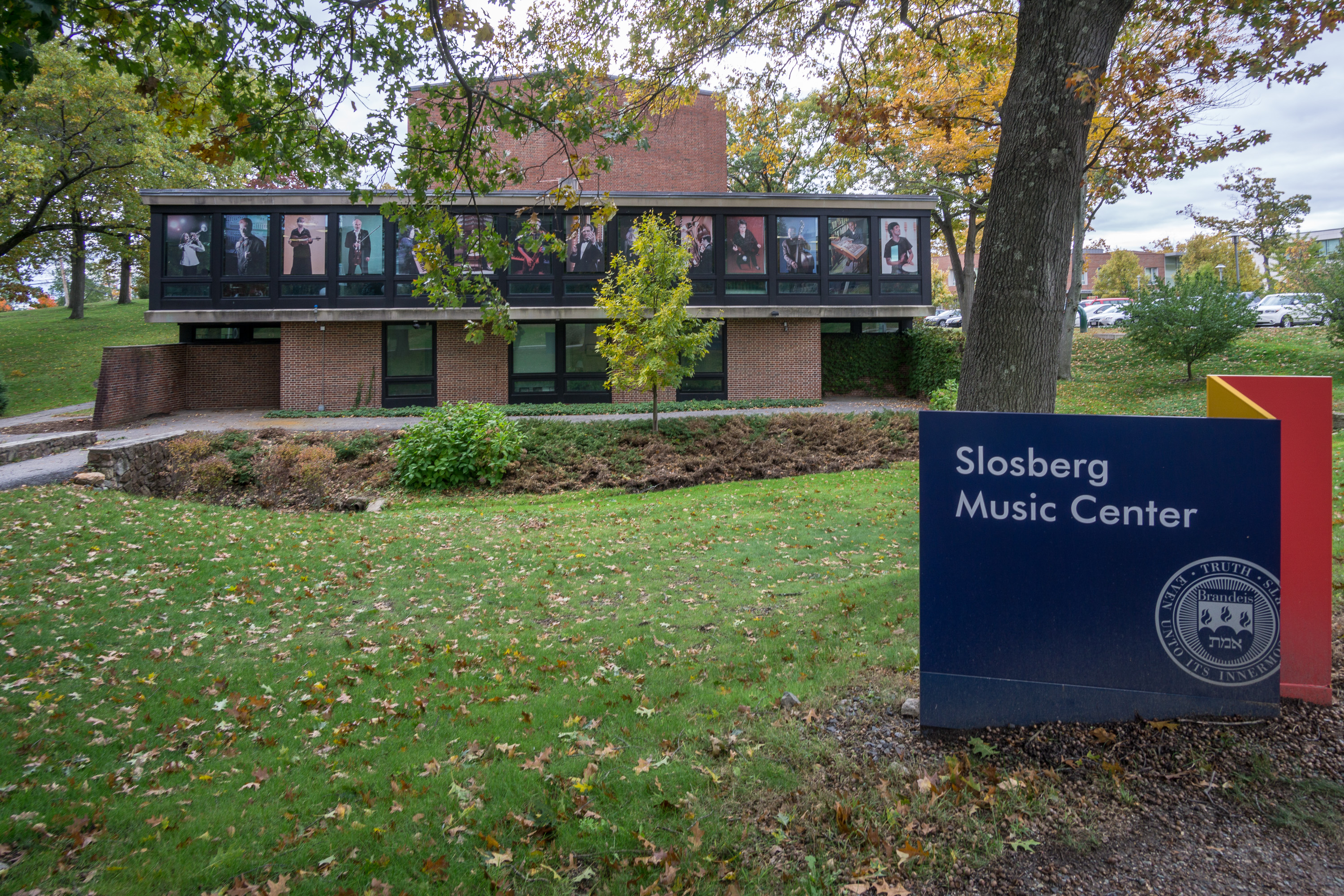
Slosberg Music Center

=== Publications ===
==== Newspaper and yearbook ====
- Archon, the yearbook (1950 to 2023)
- The Barrister News Ltd was a politically neutral broadside weekly newspaper with nationally syndicated features, published 1985–1991.
- The Blowfish, a satirical newspaper founded in February 2006, is published every other Thursday. The first issue appeared inside The Hoot, and every issue since then has been published independently.
- The Justice, which was founded in 1949 (one year after the university's inception) is an administratively independent weekly newspaper distributed every Tuesday during term.
- The Brandeis Hoot, founded in 2005, is an independent weekly newspaper published on Fridays.
- Novus Guide, incoming student guide published until 2008.

==== Magazines ====
- The Louis Lunatic, founded in the winter of 2004, is a student-run sports magazine released each semester, discussing Brandeis and national sports.
- Gravity, a humor magazine founded in 1990
- Laurel Moon, a literary magazine launched in 1991
- Artemis, a feminist magazine published intermittently in the 1980s-1990s and revived during the fall 2013 semester.
- Under the Robe, an arts and entertainment social tabloid published by The Barrister 1985–1988
- Where the Children Play, a literature and arts magazine founded in 1994 by Phil Robinson and Abigail Myers

==== Journals ====
- Brandeis Economic & Finance Review, founded by Jordan Caruso in 2010, is a student-run online and print publication dedicated to issues in business, economics, and finance. Nobel Laureate Robert Solow contributed an original article for the Fall 2010 printed publication.
- Brandeis International Journal, a student-run semesterly publication on international affairs, which became the Brandeis Journal of Politics.
- Brandeis University Law Journal, founded in 2008, is the only undergraduate-edited legal publication not affiliated with a law school in the United States.
- The Brandeis Scope reports on research occurring on the Brandeis University campus and affiliated laboratories in the sciences.
- Louis Magazine, a defunct journal of intellectual discourse, 1999–2002
- The Pulse, reports on advances in medicine; published by the Pre-Health Society
- The Open-Air Journal, a literary journal that publishes academic and creative student work in addition to weekly columns; published by students in the Heller School.

== Admissions and tuition ==
Tuition for the 2026–27 will be $73,080 for most full-time students. The previous school year, 82% of undergraduates attending the school on a full-time basis received financial aid in the form of grants or scholarships.

In May 2026, the school introduced a financial aid tool on its website that will use student transcripts and parent tax returns to calculate how much tuition "will" be if the student is admitted, including any eligible merit and need-based aid. The amount calculated by Faye (an acronym for F.A., short for financial aid) is not guaranteed for students not yet in their junior year or where documents are incomplete, or if there are significant changes in academic performance, family financial circumstances or the number of applicants to the university. This tool differs from the federally mandated college cost calculators used by other universities that provide far less certainty in their estimates.

== Research ==
Brandeis is classified among "R1: Doctoral Universities – Very High Research Activity". In FY 2017, Brandeis spent $68.4 million on research and was ranked 174 in the nation by total R&D expenditure. These include sponsored research funds from sources including the National Institutes of Health; the National Science Foundation and the US Department of Health and Human Services as well as a range of foundations.

The university's Division of Science encompasses seven departments (Biochemistry, Biology, Chemistry, Computer Science, Mathematics, Physics, and Psychology), five interdepartmental programs (Biochemistry & Biophysics, Biological Physics, Biotechnology, Genetic Counseling, Molecular & Cell Biology, and Neuroscience), six science centers (Ashton Graybiel Spatial Orientation Laboratory, National Center for Behavioral Genomics, Rosenstiel Basic Medical Sciences Research Center, Sloan-Swartz Center for Theoretical Neurobiology, Benjamin and Mae Volen National Center for Complex Systems, and W.M. Keck Institute for Cellular Visualization), and more than 50 laboratories that investigate fundamental life processes ranging from the structure and function of individual macromolecules to the mechanisms that control the behavior of whole organisms.

Faculty, postdoctoral fellows, graduate students and undergraduates investigate areas such as neuronal development and plasticity, signal transduction, immunology, the molecular basis of genetic recombination, and the three-dimensional structure of macromolecular assemblies. Brandeis science faculty include 12 National Academy of Science members, three Howard Hughes Medical Institute Investigators, two Howard Hughes Medical Institute professors, two MacArthur Foundation Fellows, and 15 American Association for the Advancement of Sciences Fellows.

Brandeis undergraduate students have the opportunity to work with faculty, postdoctoral students and graduate students to conduct original laboratory research. Brandeis also offers a number of funding resources to support independent undergraduate research projects. In 2008, Brandeis established a Science Posse program, a merit-based scholarship program that admits students based on their academic, leadership and communication skills, and their interests in studying science.

Founded by Irving Epstein, the Henry F. Fischbach Professor of Chemistry, and supported by a Howard Hughes Medical Institute grant, the Science Posse program is focused on increasing the recruitment and retention of students from traditionally underrepresented groups in the sciences. The program recruits, trains, and provides mentoring and other services for 10 inner-city Atlanta students each year who are interested in studying science at the undergraduate level.

In 2014, the National Science Foundation renewed funding for Brandeis' Materials Research Science and Engineering Center (MRSEC), which was established in 2008. This center supports interdisciplinary and multidisciplinary materials research and education that address fundamental problems in science and engineering that are important to society. In particular, the center uses simplified components to create new materials that have some of the functionalities found in living organisms.

== Student life ==
Student body composition as of May 2, 2022
| Race and ethnicity | Total |
|---|---|
| White | 44% |
| Foreign national | 20% |
| Asian | 15% |
| Hispanic | 8% |
| Other (Note: Other consists of Multiracial Americans & those who prefer to not say.) | 7% |
| Black | 6% |
Economic diversity
| Low-income (Note: The percentage of students who received an income-based federal Pell Grant intended for low-income students.) | 16% |
| Affluent (Note: The percentage of students who are a part of the American middle class at the bare minimum.) | 84% |

The university has an active student government, the Brandeis Student Union, as well as more than 270 student organizations. Fraternities and sororities are not officially recognized by Brandeis University, as they are contrary to a central tenet of the university, namely, that student organizations be open to all students, with membership determined by competency or interest.

According to an official handbook, "exclusive or secret societies are inconsistent with the principles of openness to which the University is committed." Brandeis became the first university to ban Students for Justice in Palestine from campus, occurring shortly after a vigil hosted by SJP relating to Palestinian lives lost in the Gaza war.

Brandeis has 11 a cappella groups, six undergraduate-run theater companies, one sketch comedy troupe (Boris' Kitchen, founded in 1987), three improv-comedy groups, and many other cultural and arts clubs, as well as student activism groups that advocate for causes including environmentalism, immigration reform, LGBTQ rights, feminism, and anti-racism.

Eight undergraduate organizations have received the distinction of "secured status," meaning they have existed more than five years and "have a specific purpose of serving the entire Brandeis student body." These student organizations include The Brandeis Justice, the Brandeis Emergency Medical Corps, and the Campus Activities Board. In April 2026, the Brandeis Mountain Club (B.M.C.) became the university's newest secured club. Since 1987, the organization has offered students free and fully-financed wilderness trips including, skiing, backpacking, ice-climbing, whitewater rafting and more. For several years, it has been the largest student organization in terms of student signups, with nearly 1,500 members.

Brandeis is also home to what has been cited as one of the country's few undergraduate-run law publications. Of particular note is the Brandeis Academic Debate and Speech Society (B.A.D.A.S.S.), which consistently ranks as one of the top 10 debate teams in the United States, and participates across the globe in the World Universities Debating Championships each year. During the 2012–2013 school year, B.A.D.A.S.S. was the second most successful team overall on the American Parliamentary Debate Association Circuit.

Cholmondeley's coffeehouse, commonly referred to as "Chums", is located in Brandeis' Usen Castle. Chums is a popular site for student performances and concerts, including Tracy Chapman, Bob Dylan, Joan Baez, Matt Pond PA, and Genesis (notable as their first American performance). Early footage of Chums appears in the short documentary film, Coffee House Rendezvous.

Cholmondley's is named after a notoriously ill-tempered Basset hound that was the on-campus pet for Ralph Norman, the campus photographer during the first years of Brandeis. The dog roamed the campus after dark, growling at students, often nipping at their cuffs and making a general nuisance of himself. After his death, the coffee house was named for him, not so much in remembrance but in celebration.

In 2015, in an email to student workers of the coffee house, Brandeis administration announced the immediate closure of Chums Coffeehouse, leaving said student workers unemployed. After significant pushback from the student body and alumni alike, the administration determined to make the closure temporary while the space underwent renovations.

Brandeis University's Campus Sustainability Initiative seeks to reduce the university's environmental and climate change impact. The university's accomplishments in the arena of sustainability include the creation of a student-organized on-campus Farmers' Market, the implementation of a single-stream recycling program, and the transition to GreenE certified wind power for 15% of the school's electricity needs.

Brandeis also offers an environmental studies academic program, which includes courses such as Greening the Ivory Tower: Improving Sustainability of Brandeis and Community, which serves as an incubator for student led sustainability projects.

Student projects have included greening campus offices, running after-school environmental education programs for children in the Waltham schools, and cleaning up local streams and ponds. In addition, a student-led project in 2014 established a rooftop farm atop the Gerstenzang science building consisting of 1,500 potted milk crates.

Students also have the option of taking courses with a "Community Engaged Learning" (CEL) aspect. Community-engaged learning is an aspect of the university's broad-based commitment to experiential learning.

Emergency medical services are provided by the Brandeis Emergency Medical Corps, nicknamed BEMCO, a Massachusetts-certified EMT-Basic volunteer student organization which does not charge a fee for any of its emergency services.

=== Transportation ===
The university is 9 miles (14 km) west of Boston and is directly served by Brandeis/Roberts station on the Fitchburg Commuter Rail Line and the 553 MBTA bus. The university operates a four-route shuttle system: the Campus route operates weekdays and loops around campus and serves the Charles River Apartments; the Waltham route operates weekdays and serves Moody Street, Central Square, and Main Street in Waltham; the Combo route operates weekends and holidays and combines the Campus and Waltham routes (with Sunday morning trips serving Market Basket); and the Boston/Cambridge route operates Fridays and weekends and serves the campus, Cambridge (Harvard Square), and Boston (Mass Ave, near Hynes Convention Center station). The shuttle system is operated by DPV Transportation. In addition, the 70 bus to Central Square, Cambridge and Riverside station at the end of the Green Line D branch are both near campus.

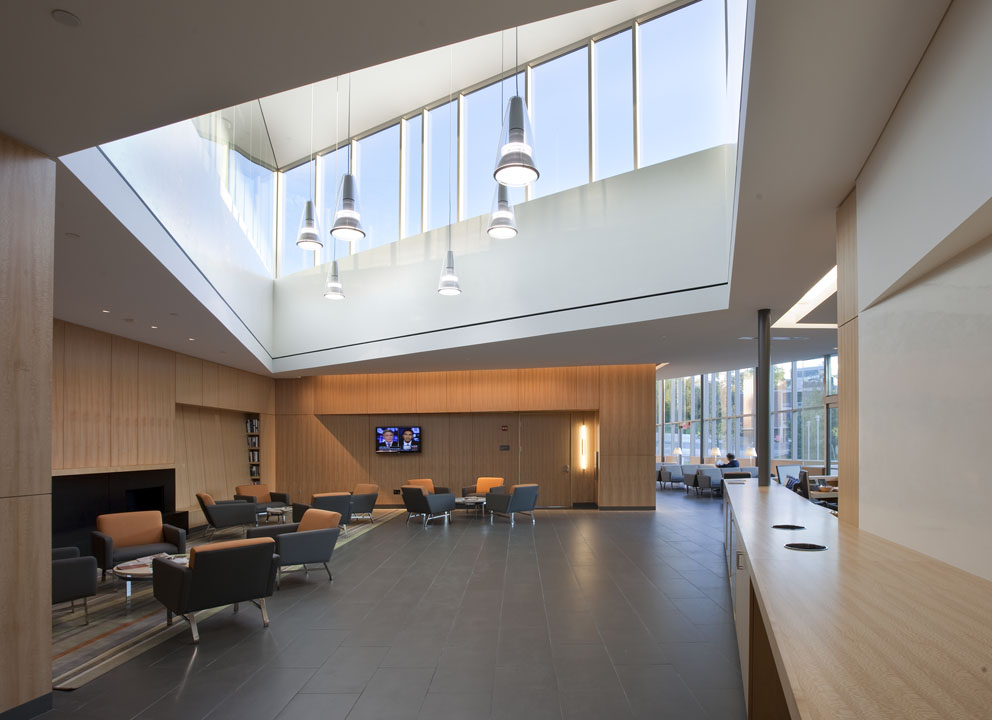
Undergraduate Admissions Center

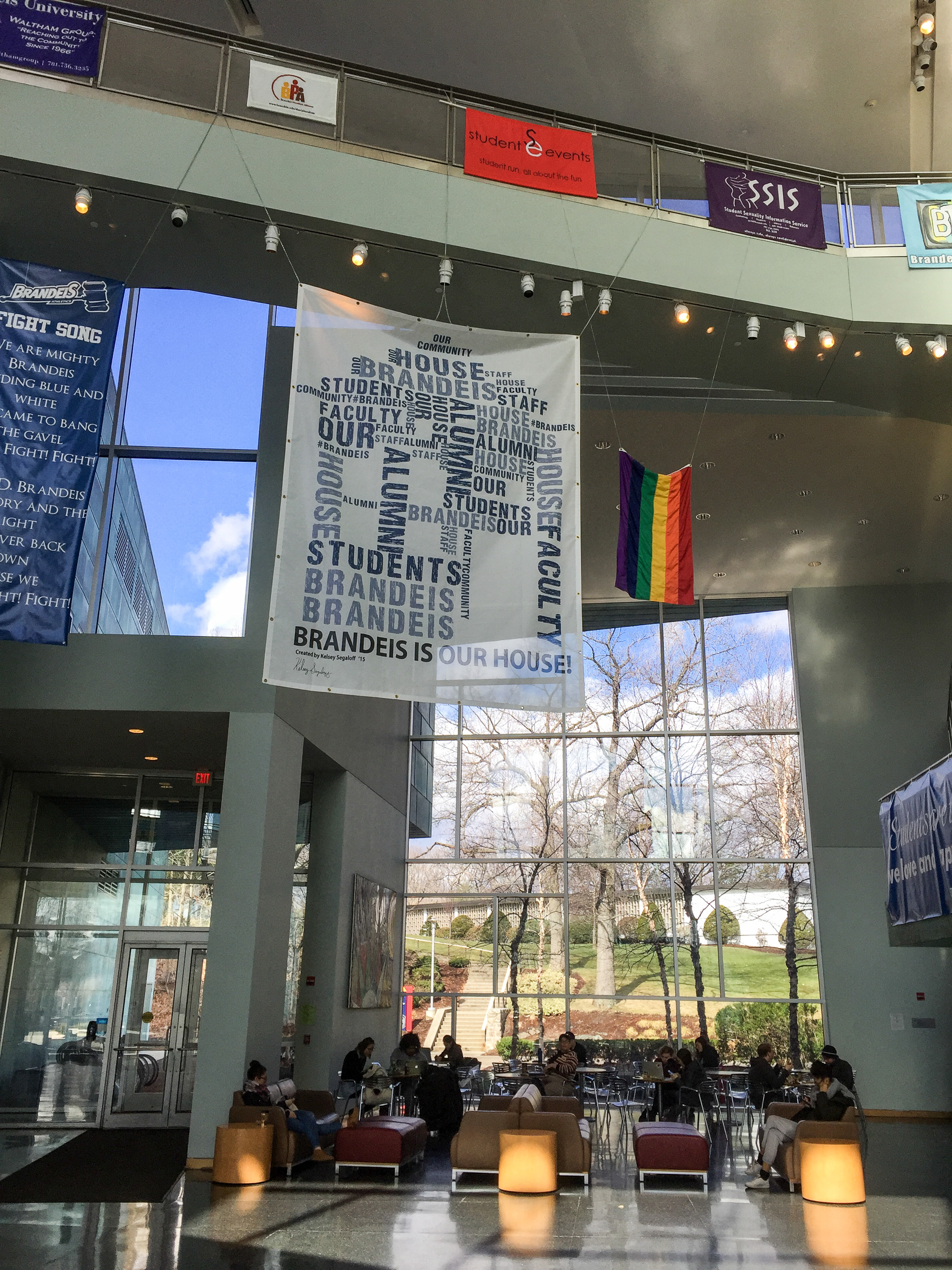
Shapiro Campus Center

== Athletics ==
Brandeis fields 19 Division III varsity athletic programs. Brandeis athletic teams compete in the University Athletic Association (UAA).

Brandeis has won NCAA team championships in men's soccer (1976) and men's cross country (1983), as well as 24 individual titles. Brandeis teams have earned 17 NCAA Division III Tournament berths and won eight Eastern Collegiate Athletic Association (ECAC) New England crowns in the last decade. Nine teams have earned national rankings, with men's and women's basketball and men's and women's soccer all ascending to the top 10 in the nation during that span.

In 2017, the men's team reached the Sweet 16 of the NCAA Tournament for the sixth year in a row, and reached the Final Four for the second straight year. It was the fourth straight year they finished ranked a top ten team in the country. Also earning national rankings in '13-14 were women's cross country and men's and women's tennis.

Brandeis also sponsors 20 club sports. Among them, ultimate frisbee, crew, archery and women's rugby have had success on a national level. The program's many intramural sports are open to students, faculty and staff.

== Notable people ==
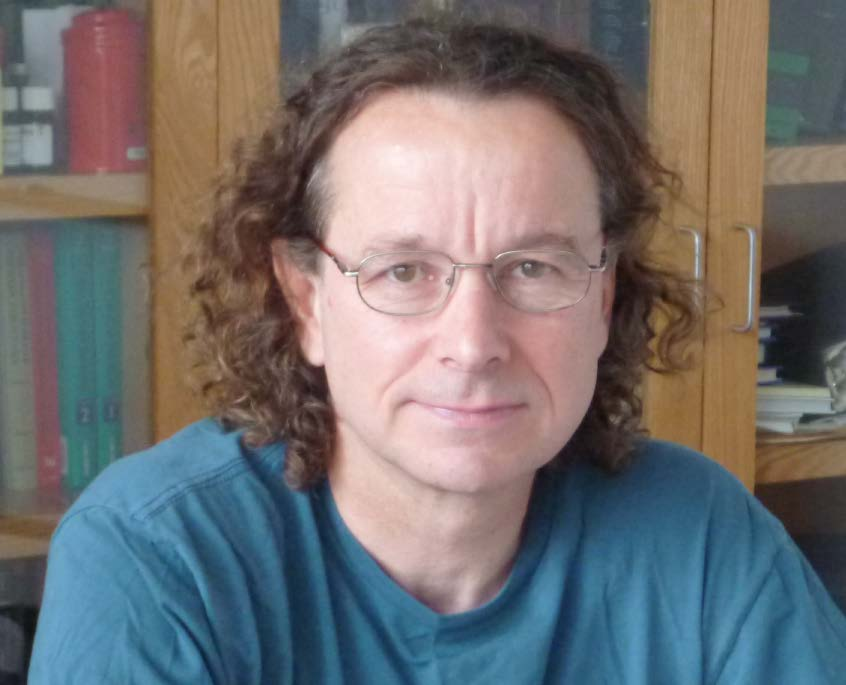
Roderick MacKinnon (BA, 1978) Winner of the Nobel Prize in Chemistry in 2003

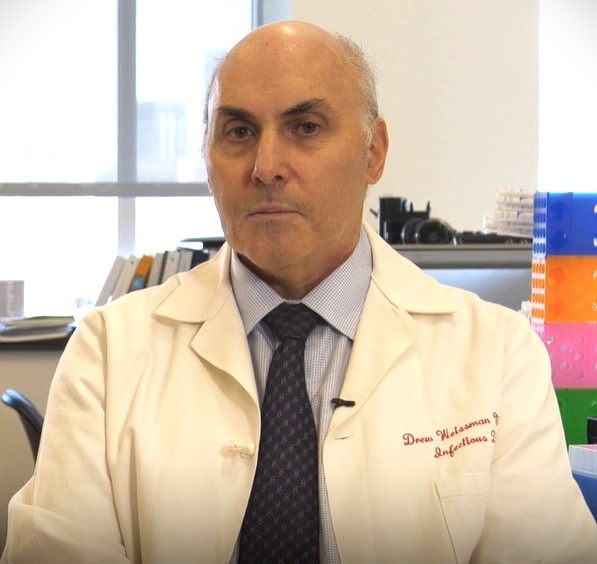
Drew Weissman (BA, MA, 1981) Winner of the Nobel Prize in Physiology or Medicine in 2023

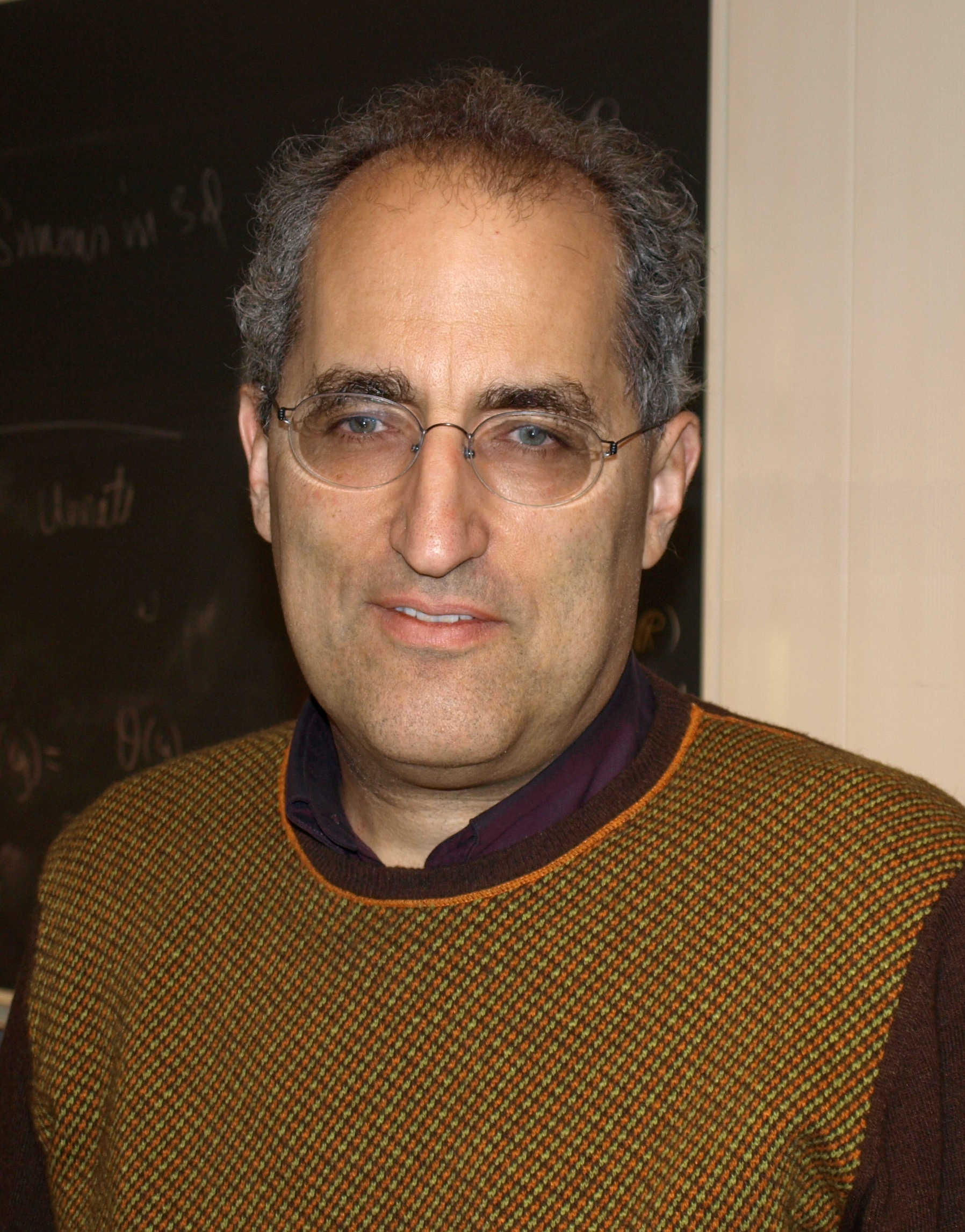
Edward Witten (BA, 1971) Theoretical physicist and Fields Medal recipient

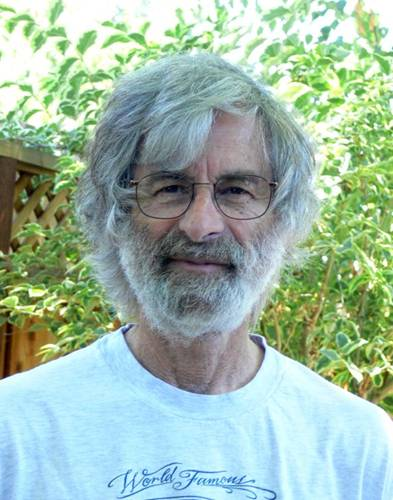
Leslie Lamport (PhD, 1972) Turing Award–winning computer scientist and inventor of the first algorithm for reading the state of an arbitrary distributed system

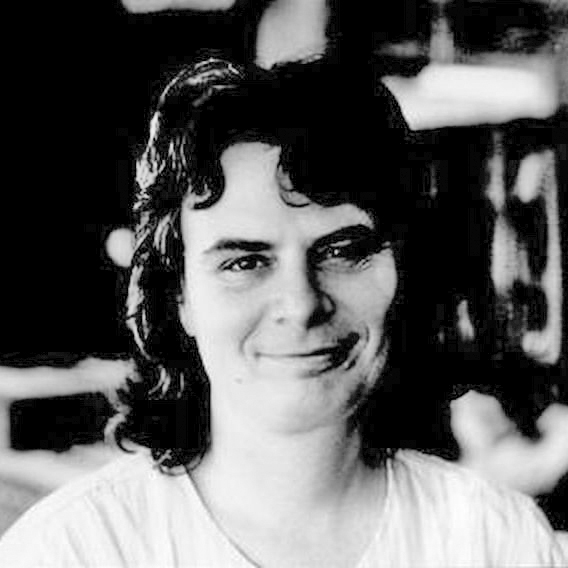
Karen Uhlenbeck (PhD, 1968) First (and to-date only) woman to win the Abel Prize in Mathematics

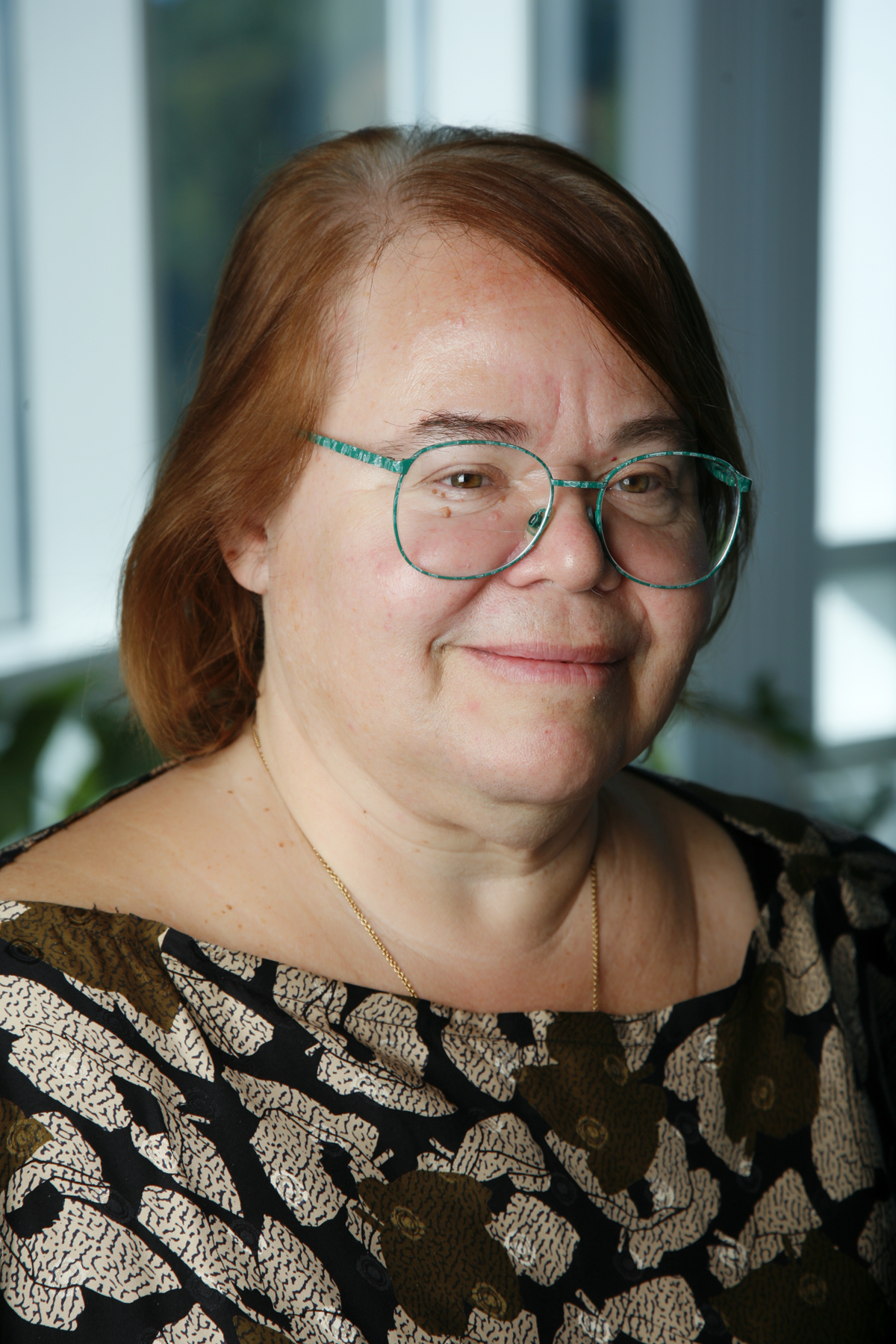
Eve Marder (BA, 1965) recipient of the Kavli Prize in Neuroscience (2016) and National Medals of Science (2023).

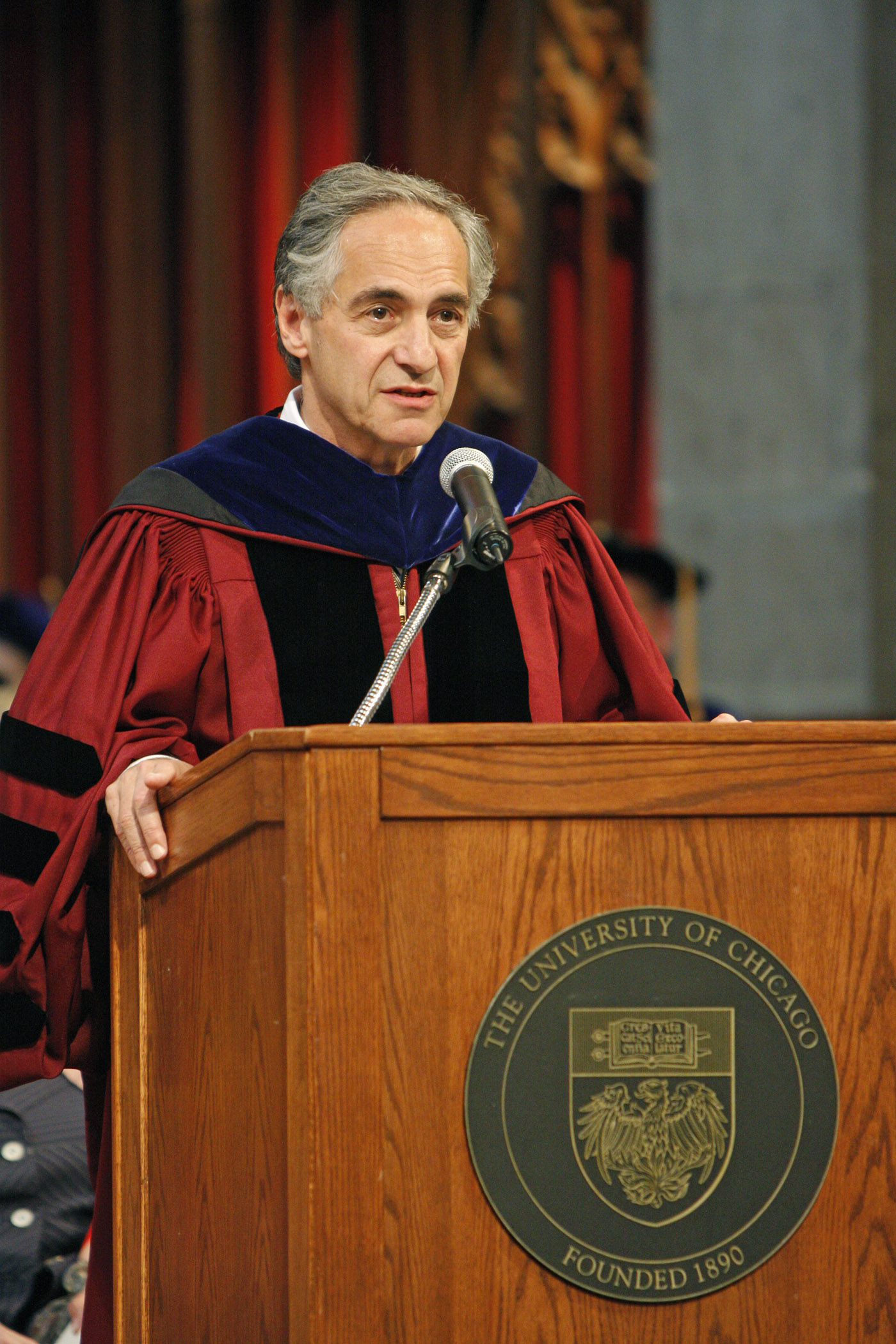
Robert Zimmer (BA, 1968) Mathematician and president of the University of Chicago from 2006 to 2021

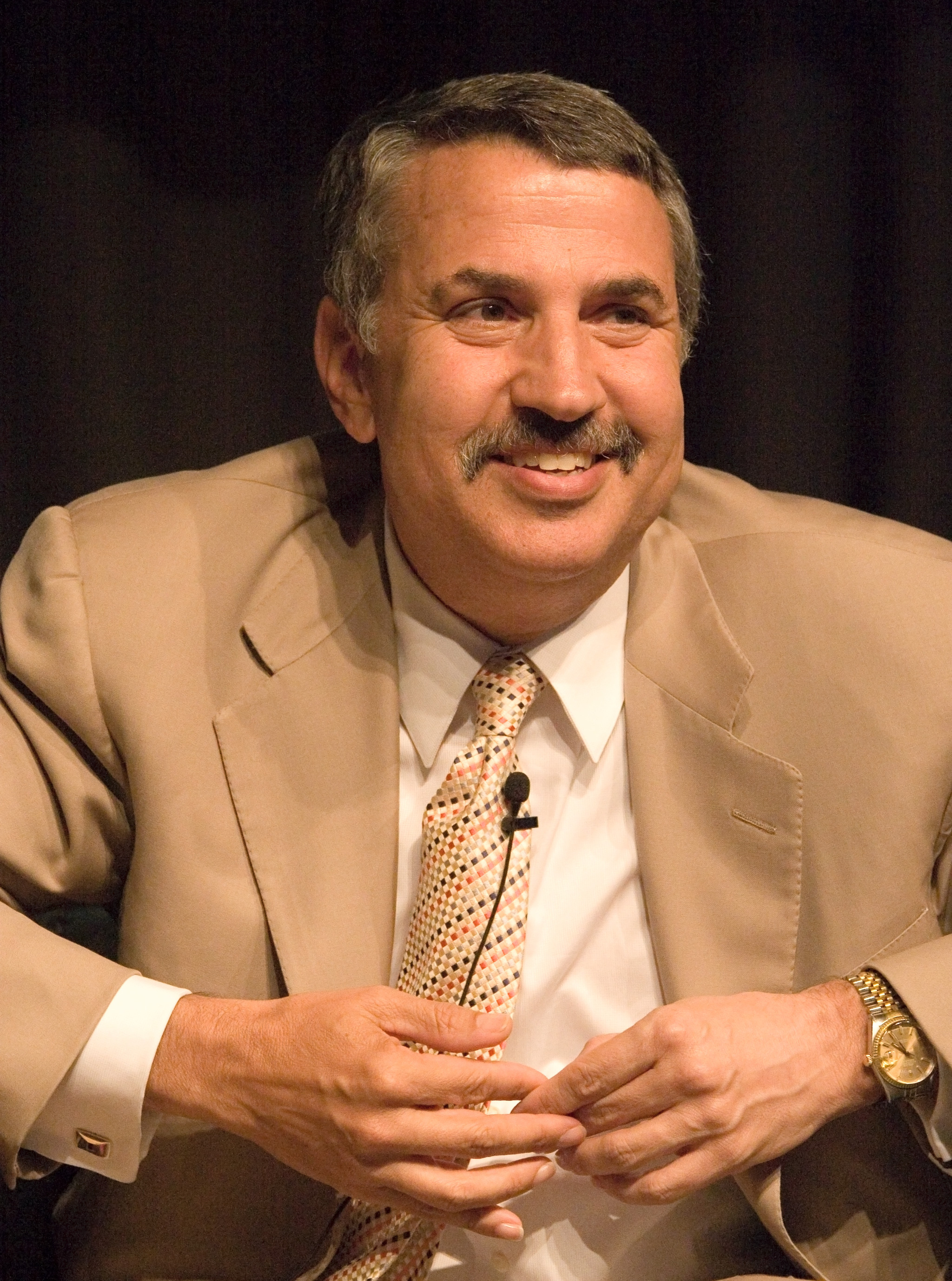
Thomas Friedman (BA, 1975) Three-time Pulitzer Prize winner

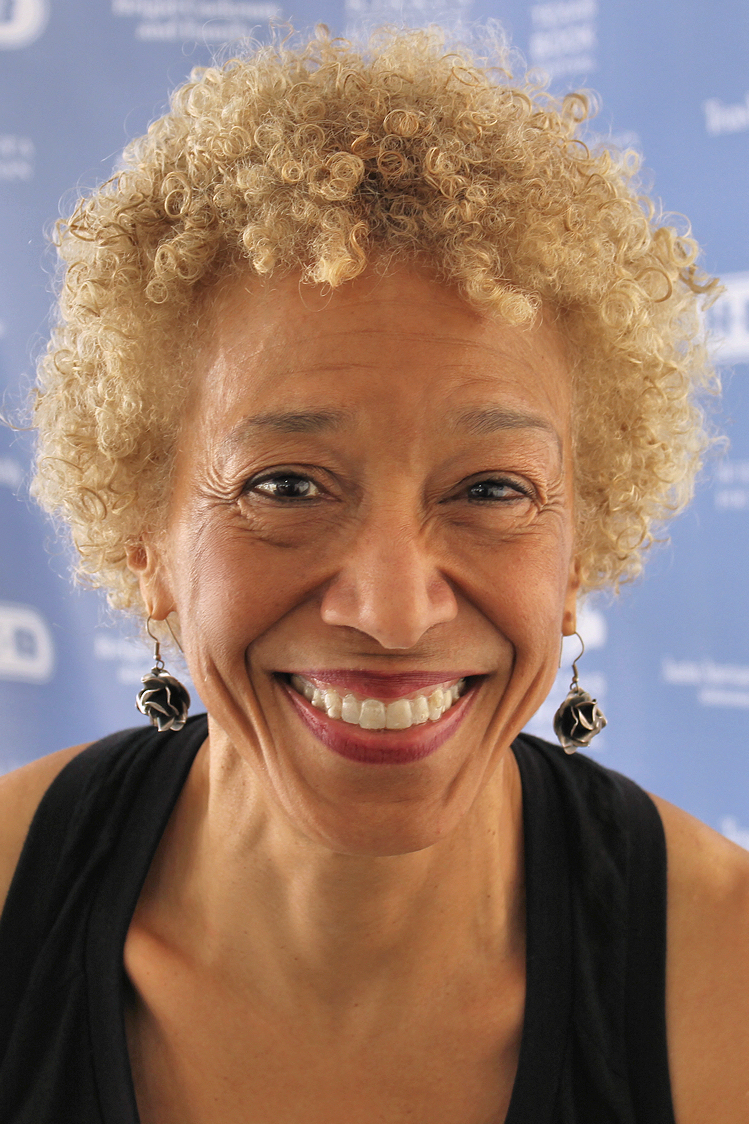
Margo Jefferson (BA, 1970) Pulitzer Prize for Criticism winner

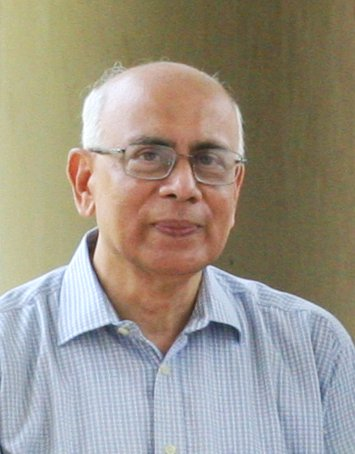
V. Balakrishnan (physicist) (PhD, 1970) Indian theoretical physicist

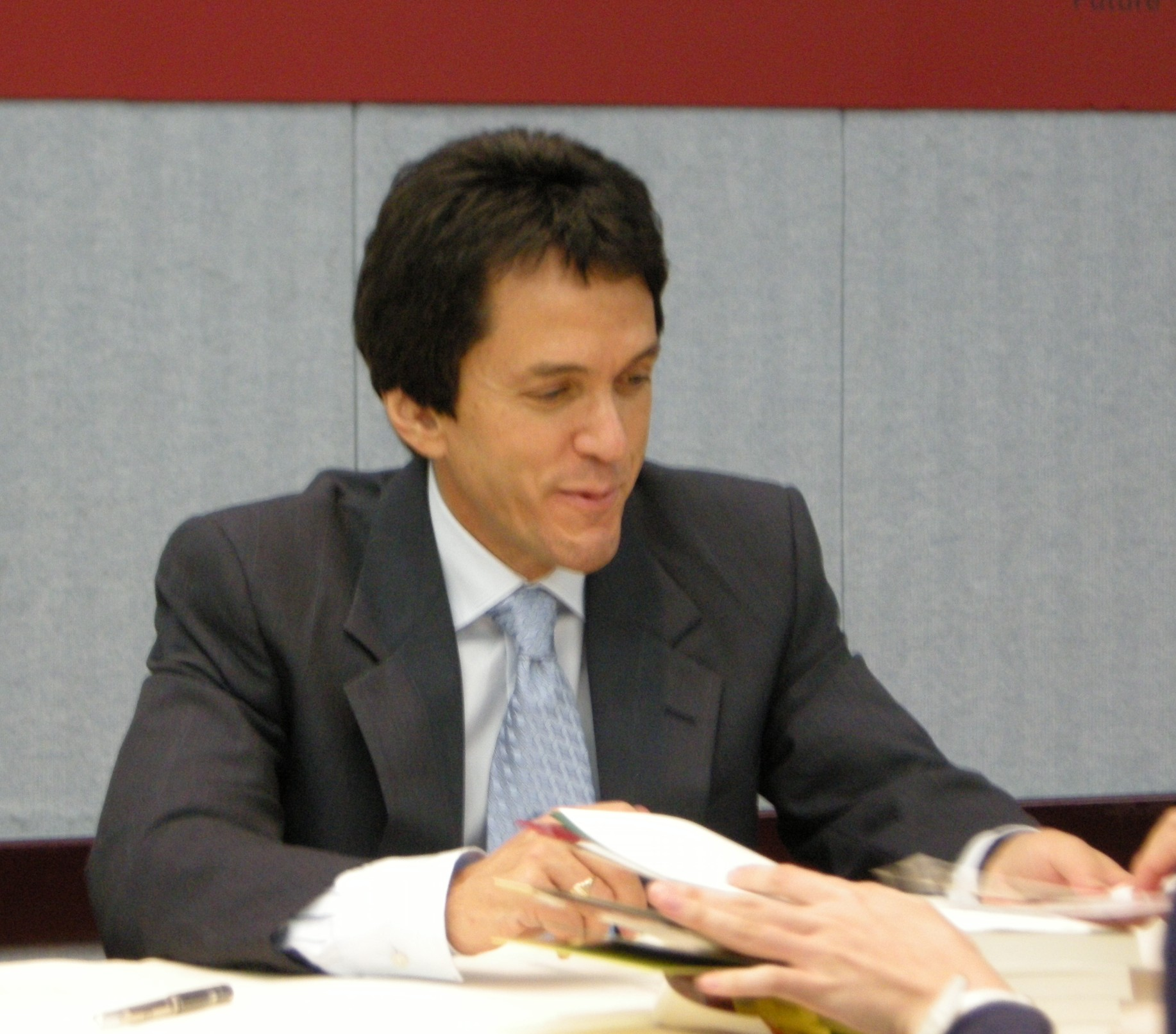
Mitch Albom (BA, 1979) New York Times Best Selling Author of Tuesdays with Morrie

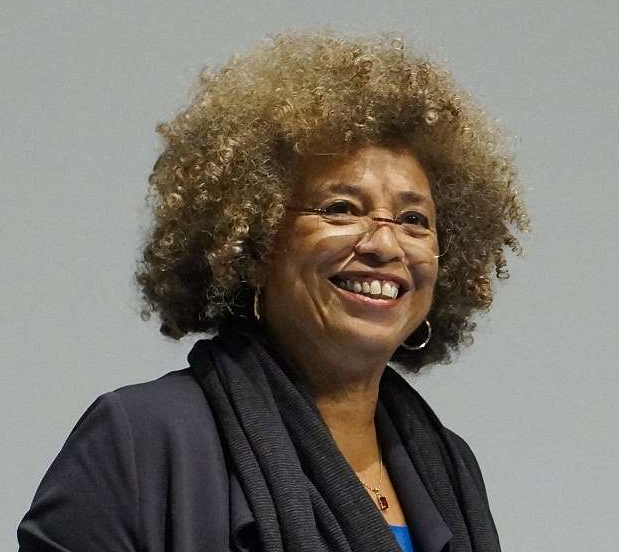
Angela Davis (BA, 1965) American political activist, philosopher, academic, and author

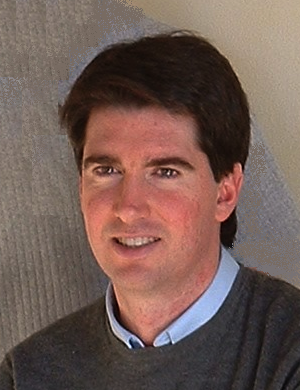
Adam Cheyer (BA, 1988) Co-founder of Siri and former director of engineering for the iPhone

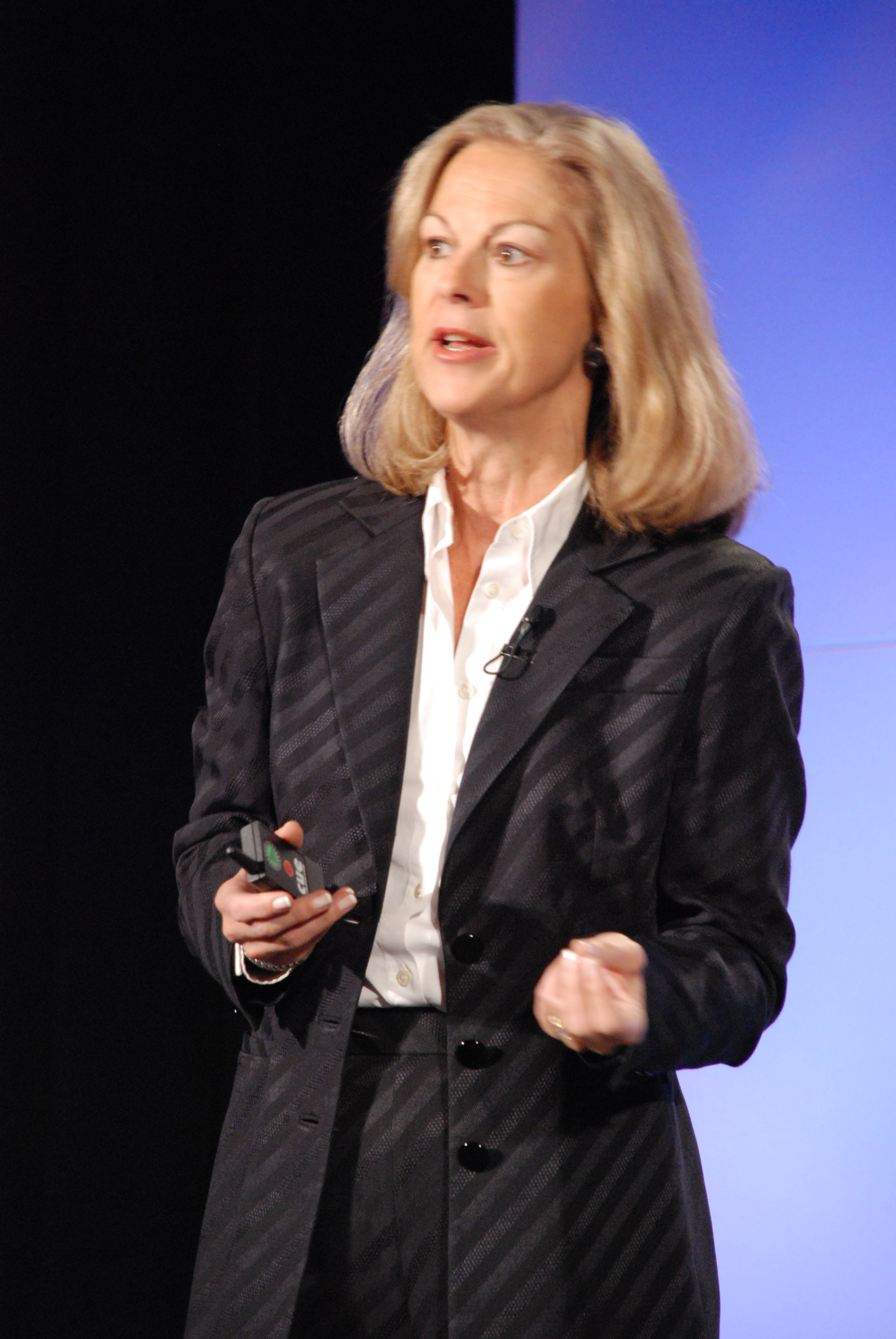
Christie Hefner (BA, 1974) Former CEO of Playboy Enterprises.

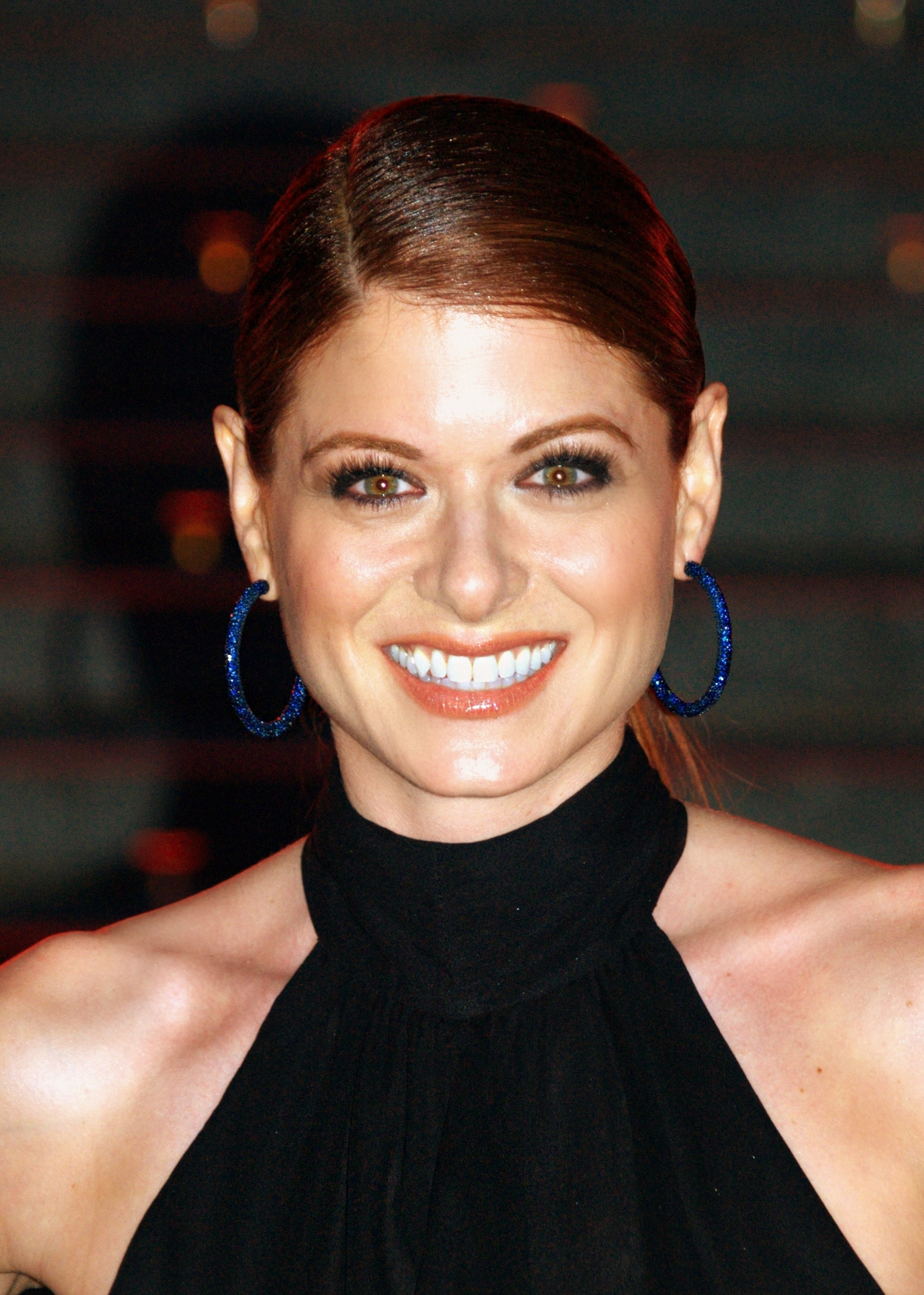
Debra Messing (BA, 1990) Emmy Award–winning actress

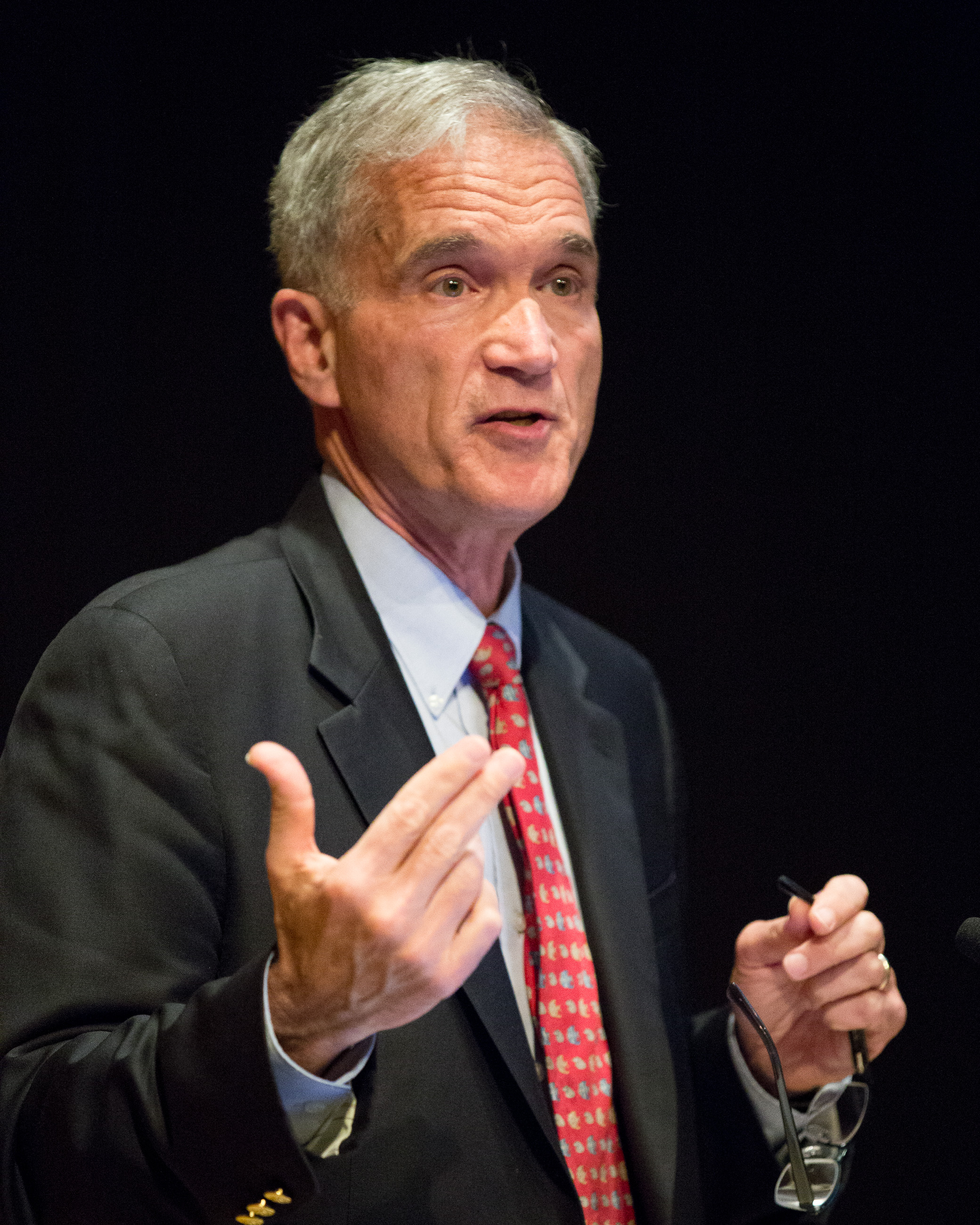
David Kertzer (PhD 1974) Pulitzer Prize–winning historian (2014).

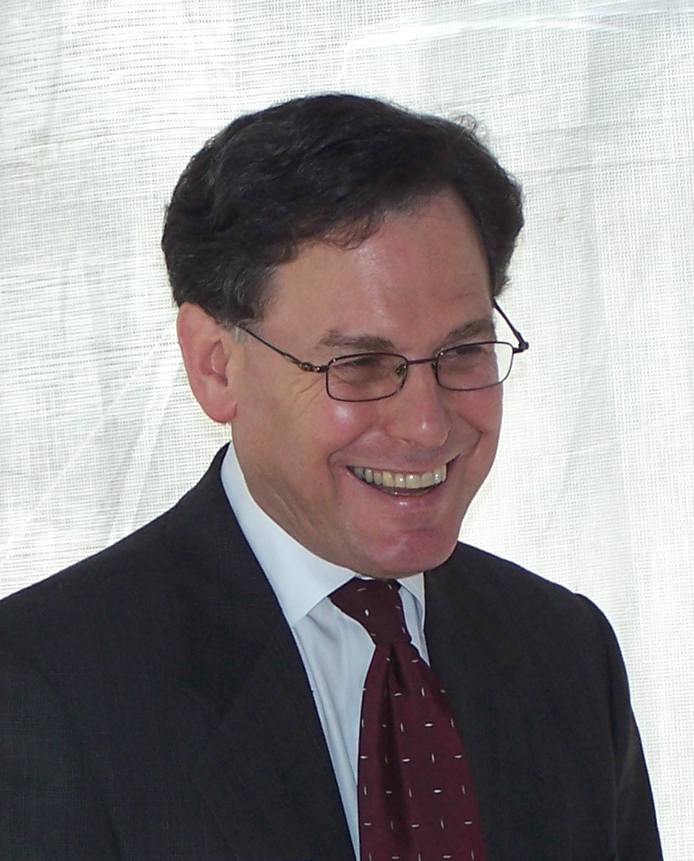
Sidney Blumenthal (BA, 1969) Journalist and political operative known for his association with President Clinton

Among the better-known graduates are co-creators of the television show Friends David Crane and Marta Kauffman, political activists Abbie Hoffman and Angela Davis, journalists Thomas Friedman and Paul Solman, Congressman Stephen J. Solarz, physicist and Fields medalist Edward Witten, mathematician and Abel Prize recipient Karen Uhlenbeck, novelist Ha Jin, political theorist Michael Walzer, actresses Debra Messing and Loretta Devine, philosopher Michael Sandel, olympic silver medalist fencer Tim Morehouse, social and psychoanalytic theorist Nancy Chodorow, author Mitch Albom, filmmakers Debra Granik and Jonathan Newman, music producer Jon Landau, and computer scientist Leslie Lamport.

Among the distinguished faculty, present and past, are mathematician Heisuke Hironaka, a Fields medalist, biologists and Nobel laureates Michael Rosbash and Jeffrey C. Hall, composers Arthur Berger, Leonard Bernstein, Martin Boykan, Eric Chasalow, Irving Fine, Donald Martino, David Rakowski, Harold Shapero, and Yehudi Wyner, social theorist Herbert Marcuse, psychologist Abraham Maslow, linguist James Pustejovsky, human rights activist Eleanor Roosevelt, Anita Hill, historian David Hackett Fischer, economist Thomas Sowell, chemist S Katharine Hammond, diplomat Dennis Ross, children's author Margret Rey, former United States Secretary of Labor Robert Reich, sociologist Morrie Schwartz, poets Olga Broumas and Adrienne Rich, author Stephen McCauley, virologist and author of Fields Virology Bernard N. Fields, and Pulitzer Prize–winning columnist Eileen McNamara.

== See also ==
- List of Brandeis University people
- National Center for Jewish Film
- Our Generation Speaks
- Rosenstiel Award
