= James Chambers =

James Chambers may refer to:

== Arts, entertainment and publishing ==
- James Chambers, English musician with Bob Kerr's Whoopee Band
- James Chambers (writer) (born 1970), American author and comic book writer
- James S. Chambers (publisher) (1821–1904), American publisher of the Philadelphia Bulletin
- James S. Chambers (editor) (1853–1923), American editor of Public Ledger and grandfather of Whittaker Chambers
- James F. Chambers Jr., (1913–2006), American newspaperman
- Jimmy Cliff (1944–2025), Jamaican reggae musician (born James Chambers)

== Sport ==
- Jimmy Chambers (footballer) (Robert James Chambers, 1908-1977), Northern Irish footballer, see List of Bury F.C. players (25–99 appearances)
- James Chambers (English footballer) (born 1980), mostly played for English clubs
- James Chambers (Irish footballer) (born 1987), mostly played for Irish clubs, and Ireland

== Other fields ==
- James Chambers (mayor) (1864–1934), American politician
- James Chambers (pastoralist) (1811–1862), South Australian colonist
- James Chambers (politician) (1863–1917), Irish lawyer and Unionist
- James Cox Chambers (born 1950s), American billionaire heir
- James Cox Chambers Jr., son of the above, known as Fergie Chambers

== Other meanings ==
- USS James S. Chambers, schooner in the American Civil War

== See also ==
- Jimmy Chambers (singer) (born 1946), vocalist with Londonbeat
