= Puebla tunnels =

The Puebla tunnels are a system of tunnels under the Mexican city of Puebla. Long considered to be an urban legend, they were rediscovered in 2015. They are believed to be up to 500 years old.

The tunnel system is believed to extend for more than 10 km. The tunnels are high enough that a person can easily ride through on horseback. These tunnels begin in the historic center of Puebla and end to the Loreto fort, where the Cinco de Mayo battle happened. Researchers consider these tunnels may have been used by soldiers during the battle of Mexican liberation, though they also could have been used by clergy or also common folk. Various old and antique items such as old playthings like toys, marbles, kitchen accessories, guns, gunpowder and bullets, were found trapped in the mud. Most of these items and weaponry were from the mid-19th century, about the time of the Battle of Puebla dispute between Mexico and France.

The city is planning to renovate part of the system and to open it for public viewing. As of 2017, tunnels are open for tours. The tour over the tunnel involves a guided visit and a museum.
