= James S. Chambers (editor) =

American journalist (1853/1854–1923)

James S. Chambers (1853/1854–1923) was a 19th-20th-Century American editor at the Public Ledger among other Philadelphia newspapers and grandfather of Time senior editor (and ex-Soviet spy) Whittaker Chambers.

== Background ==
James Slater Chambers was born in Philadelphia in 1853 or 1854 and named after his uncle, publisher James Slater Chambers (1821–1904). He was the son of William Connel Chambers and Mary Stillwell Shaw.

== Career ==
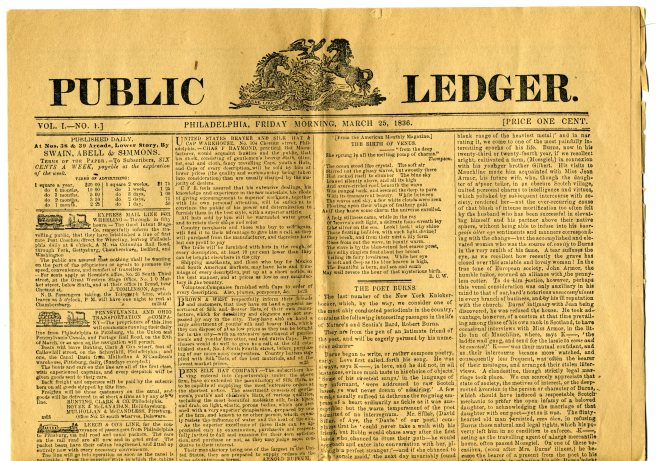
Public Ledger first edition (March 25, 1836)

Chambers was an editor for Philadelphia newspapers, including the Philadelphia Bulletin and Philadelphia Record.

From the turn of the century to the time of his death in 1923, he worked at the Public Ledger.

The New York Times called him a "veteran Philadelphia newspaper man," known in both his profession and political circles as "Uncle Jim." The Philadelphia Inquirer noted that he had worked in newspapers for more than forty years.

His grandchild Whittaker Chambers was born at his home in Philadelphia. Before she went insane, James S. Chambers' wife shared with her grandson her Quaker background, which had a long-term influence on him. Of his paternal grandfather, Whittaker Chambers wrote that he "approached Falstaff in girth, and equalled him in capacity for liquid intake–chiefly beer." He claimed to be a friend of Theodore Roosevelt. Despite shortcoming in the eyes of his grandson, "This old reprobate was the first man who sat down with me and explained to me the world in terms of politics and history. He first made me aware that politics is history in the making. ... For his mind, I respected him deeply."

== Personal and death ==
In the 1870s, Chambers married Elizabeth Mendoza Carpenter of Philadelphia. They lived in Germantown (now a Philadelphia suburb). Two of their five children survived early days, Jay (born 1877) and Helen (born 1884).

He was a member of the Masonic St. Alban Lodge No. 529 F&AM.

James Slater Chambers died, aged 69 or 70, on February 2, 1923, as he was walking home to Germantown from work in down Philadelphia.
