= USS James S. Chambers =

Gunboat of the United States Navy

History

United States
- Acquired: 4 September 1861
- Commissioned: 16 December 1861
- Decommissioned: 31 August 1865
- Fate: Sold, 27 September 1865

General characteristics
- Displacement: 401 tons
- Length: 124 ft 6 in (37.95 m)
- Beam: 29 ft 3 in (8.92 m)
- Depth of hold: 12 ft 2 in (3.71 m)
- Propulsion: sail
- Complement: 62
- Armament: four 32-pounder guns

USS James S. Chambers was a schooner acquired by the Union Navy during the American Civil War. She was used by the Union Navy as a gunboat in support of the Union Navy blockade of Confederate waterways.

== Naming ==
The Navy named the ship after James S. Chambers. He was appointed Navy agent for the Port of Philadelphia on August 10, 1861, by U.S. President Abraham Lincoln. He was already a co-owner and editor of the Philadelphia Bulletin (then known as the Evening Bulletin). In 1860, one partner sold out and, with increased ownership, the co-owners voted Chambers publisher, a position he held at least as late as 1878 (also listed as publisher of the Philadelphia Day). Chambers was an unabashed supporter of Lincoln not only due to his own position as Navy agent but also because his aged father had been made superintendent of warehouses for the Philadelphia customs service.

== Service history ==
James S. Chambers was a three-masted schooner purchased by the Navy at Philadelphia, Pennsylvania, 4 September 1861; and commissioned at Philadelphia Navy Yard 16 December, Lt. Dennis Condry in command. The schooner sailed from Philadelphia 6 days later and joined the Gulf Blockading Squadron at Ship Island, Mississippi, 23 January 1862. Her diligent service in the Gulf of Mexico and off the Florida coast was first rewarded on 23 August when she captured blockade-running schooner Corelia with a cargo of supplies badly needed by the South. Two days later she took Confederate steamer Union attempting to escape with a cargo of 350 bales of cotton.

James S. Chambers scored again on 4 March 1863—the second anniversary of Lincoln's inauguration—when men from her whaleboats boarded and took Spanish sloop Relampago with a cargo of coffee, liquors, and soldiers shoes. The triumph was capped late that afternoon when a sail was sighted to the south standing in for land. The unidentified ship ignored a shot across her bow and continued to race for the beach without showing any colors. The Union schooner continued the chase firing at her quarry until she ran aground. The following morning men from James S. Chambers boarded the wreck, a schooner of pilot boat-build, and identified her as Ida. They removed several boatloads of cargo before setting her afire. A final prize came on 18 June 1863 when the vigilant blockader captured schooner Rebekah.

A period of almost a year's blockading duty stationed at West Pass, St. George's Sound, Florida, ensued. On 12 May 1864 boats from James S. Chambers and USS Somerset drove off a body of Confederate sailors embarking on a boat expedition ordered to capture the Union's side-wheel steamer USS Adela. In August 1864 James S. Chambers encountered a new enemy: yellow fever. The epidemic forced her to return to Philadelphia after taking the lives of 13 sailors and 3 officers. Only two or three members of her crew escaped the disease. On New Year's Day 1865 the indomitable ship was back in action with the South Atlantic Blockading Squadron stationed at Bull's Bay, South Carolina She was in the joint expeditionary force which attacked the rear of Charleston, South Carolina, 12 February. A fortnight later, her boat crews raided and destroyed extensive Confederate salt works and stockpiles at Palmetto Point, South Carolina.

Toward the end of the war James 8. Chambers served as a quarantine vessel at Port Royal, South Carolina. She sailed for the North 27 July and decommissioned 31 August. James S. Chambers was sold at public auction in New York City to Mr. Rhinehart 27 September 1865.
