= Politicker Network =

National network of state-based political websites

- Website type: Political news
- Available in: English
- Owner: The New York Observer
- Registration: No

The Politicker Network, or Politicker.com, was a national network of fifty state-based political websites operated by the New York Observer.

== Origins ==
The network had its origins in journalist Ben Smith's New York Observer blog, "The Politicker," which focused on New York state politics. Launched in 2005, the original blog became "the most widely read" blog among political circles. It was called the "Best Local Politics Blog" by The Village Voice, who noted the lively comment section. In 2005, failed candidate for the Democratic nomination for Mayor of New York City, Christopher X. Brodeur, was arrested for leaving death threats on Smith's New York Observer voice mail, in retaliation for unflattering coverage in the Politicker blog.

== Growth and decline ==
James Pindell, formerly of The Boston Globe, was hired as National Managing Editor in January 2008.

In December 2008, the network was reduced from 17 to 6 sites, with a focus on the northeast region. By January 2009, the New Hampshire, Massachusetts, and Pennsylvania websites were closed, leaving the network with sites remaining in New York and New Jersey. Those closings effectively ended the national aspirations of the "Politicker" brand.

== State bureaus ==
The Pennsylvania bureau, called PolitickerPA.com, was cited as a source by the other news media, including the Philadelphia Daily News, the Pittsburgh Post-Gazette, the Pittsburgh Tribune-Review, the Pittsburgh City Paper, The Beaver County Times, The Citizens' Voice, and the Lancaster New Era.

Journalist Dan Hirschhorn worked as the Philadelphia-based correspondent for PolitickerPA. PolitickerPA was closed in January 2009, causing one journalist to exclaim "Damn. One less source to do our work for us." The Pittsburgh Tribune-Review and the Lancaster Sunday News reported on local connections in PolitickerPA's "Power List 2008."

PolitickerPA is not to be confused with another Pennsylvania politics website, PoliticsPA.
