= Independence Day (United States) =

U.S. federal holiday on July 4

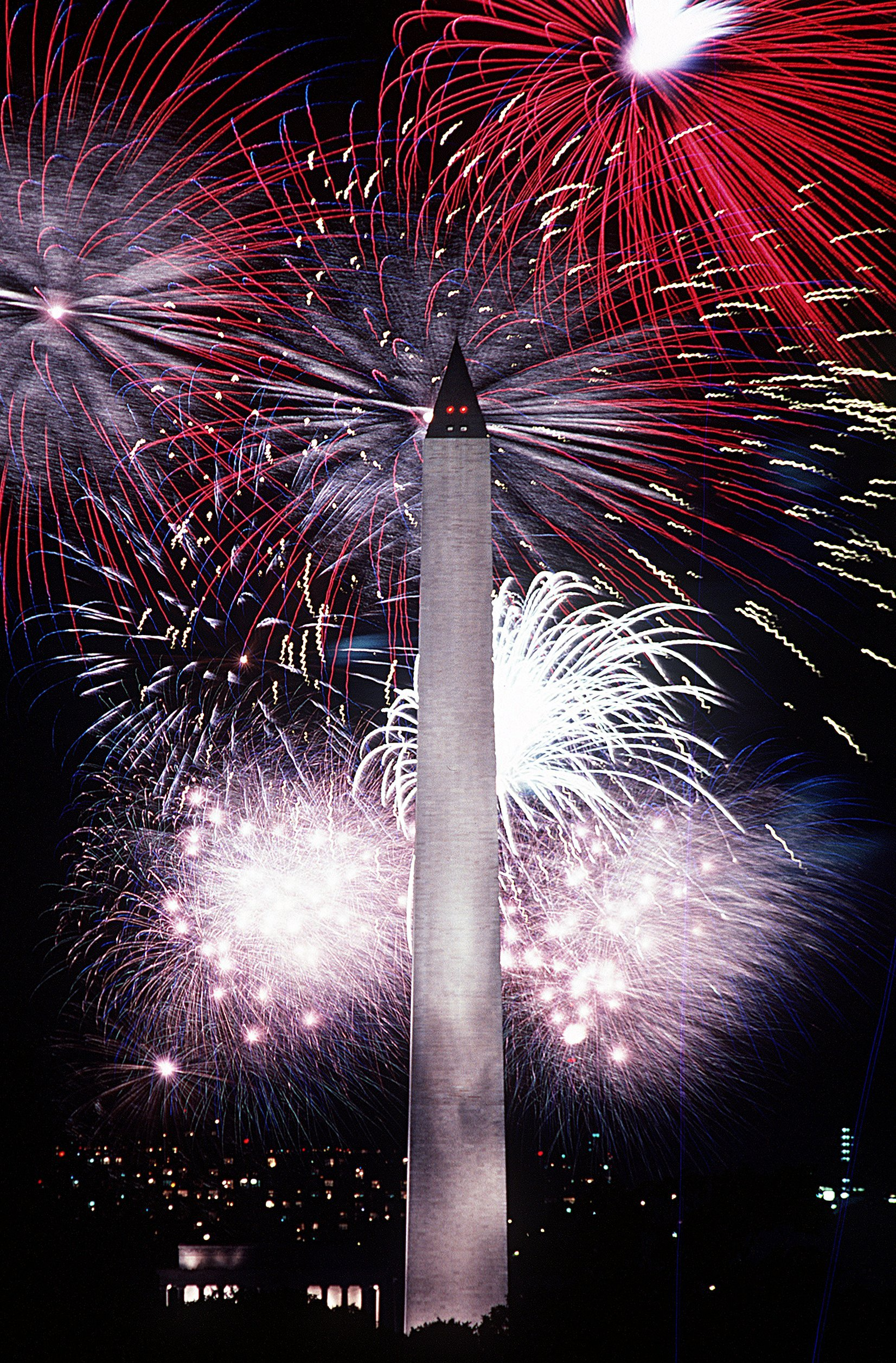
- Fireworks displays, such as this one over the Washington Monument in 1986, take place annually across the United States on July 4, known as Independence Day.
- Also called: Fourth of July
- Observed by: United States
- Type: National day
- Significance: The day in 1776 that the Declaration of Independence was adopted by the Second Continental Congress in Philadelphia
- Celebrations: Fireworks, family reunions, concerts, barbecues, picnics, parades, baseball games
- Date: July 4 (Note: "Federal law (5 U.S.C. 6103) establishes the public holidays ... for Federal employees. Please note that most Federal employees work on a Monday through Friday schedule. For these employees, when a holiday falls on a nonworkday – Saturday or Sunday --the holiday usually is observed on Monday (if the holiday falls on Sunday) or Friday (if the holiday falls on Saturday)." "Federal Holidays". U.S. Office of Personnel Management.)
- Frequency: Annual

Independence Day, known colloquially as the Fourth of July, is a federal holiday in the United States which commemorates the adoption of the Declaration of Independence on July 4, 1776, establishing the United States of America.

By doing this, the delegates to the Second Continental Congress declared that the Thirteen Colonies were no longer subject (and subordinate) to the monarch of Britain, King George III, and were now united, free, and independent states. The Congress voted to approve independence by passing the Lee Resolution on July 2 and adopted the Declaration of Independence two days later, on July 4.

Independence Day is commonly associated with fireworks, parades, barbecues, carnivals, fairs, picnics, concerts, baseball games, family reunions, political speeches, and ceremonies, in addition to various other public and private events celebrating the history, government, and traditions of the United States. Independence Day is the national day of the United States.

== Background ==
During the American Revolution, the legal separation of the thirteen colonies from Great Britain in 1776 actually occurred on July 2, when the Second Continental Congress voted to approve the Lee Resolution, a resolution of independence that had been proposed in June by Richard Henry Lee of Virginia declaring the United States independent from Great Britain's rule. After voting for independence, Congress turned its attention to the Declaration of Independence, a statement explaining this decision, which had been prepared by the Committee of Five, which asked Thomas Jefferson to author its first draft.

While Jefferson consulted extensively with the other four members of the Committee of Five, he largely wrote the Declaration of Independence in isolation over 17 days between June 11, 1776, and June 28, 1776, from the second floor he was renting in a three-story private home at 700 Market Street in Philadelphia, now known as the Declaration House, and within walking distance of Independence Hall.

Congress debated and revised the wording of the Declaration, removing Jefferson's vigorous denunciation of King George III for importing the slave trade, finally approving it two days later on July 4. A day earlier, John Adams wrote to his wife Abigail:

The second day of July 1776, will be the most memorable epoch in the history of America. I am apt to believe that it will be celebrated by succeeding generations as the great anniversary festival. It ought to be commemorated as the day of deliverance, by solemn acts of devotion to God Almighty. It ought to be solemnized with pomp and parade, with shows, games, sports, guns, bells, bonfires, and illuminations, from one end of this continent to the other, from this time forward forever more.

Adams's prediction was off by two days. From the outset, Americans celebrated independence on July 4, the date shown on the much-publicized Declaration of Independence, rather than on July 2, the date the resolution of independence was approved in a closed session of Congress.

The Committee of Five presenting the Declaration of Independence to congress.

Historians have long disputed whether members of Congress signed the Declaration of Independence on July 4, even though Thomas Jefferson, John Adams, and Benjamin Franklin all later wrote that they had signed it on that day. Most historians have concluded that the Declaration was signed nearly a month after its adoption, on August 2, 1776, and not on July 4 as is commonly believed.

By remarkable coincidence, Thomas Jefferson and John Adams, the only two signatories of the Declaration of Independence later to serve as presidents of the United States, both died on the same day: July 4, 1826, which was the 50th anniversary of the Declaration. Although not a signatory of the Declaration of Independence, James Monroe, another Founding Father who was elected president, also died on July 4, 1831, making him the third President who died on the anniversary of independence. The only U.S. president to have been born on Independence Day was Calvin Coolidge, who was born on July 4, 1872.

== Observance ==
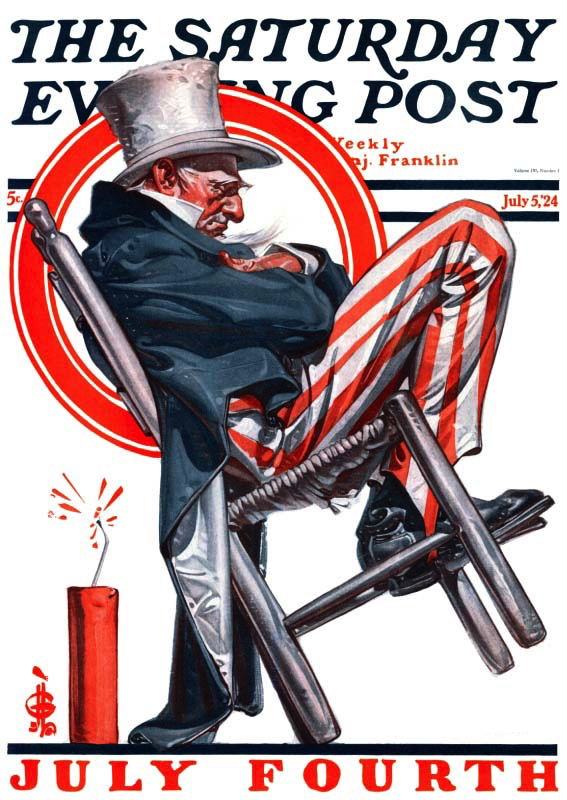
Independence Day issue of The Saturday Evening Post in 1924

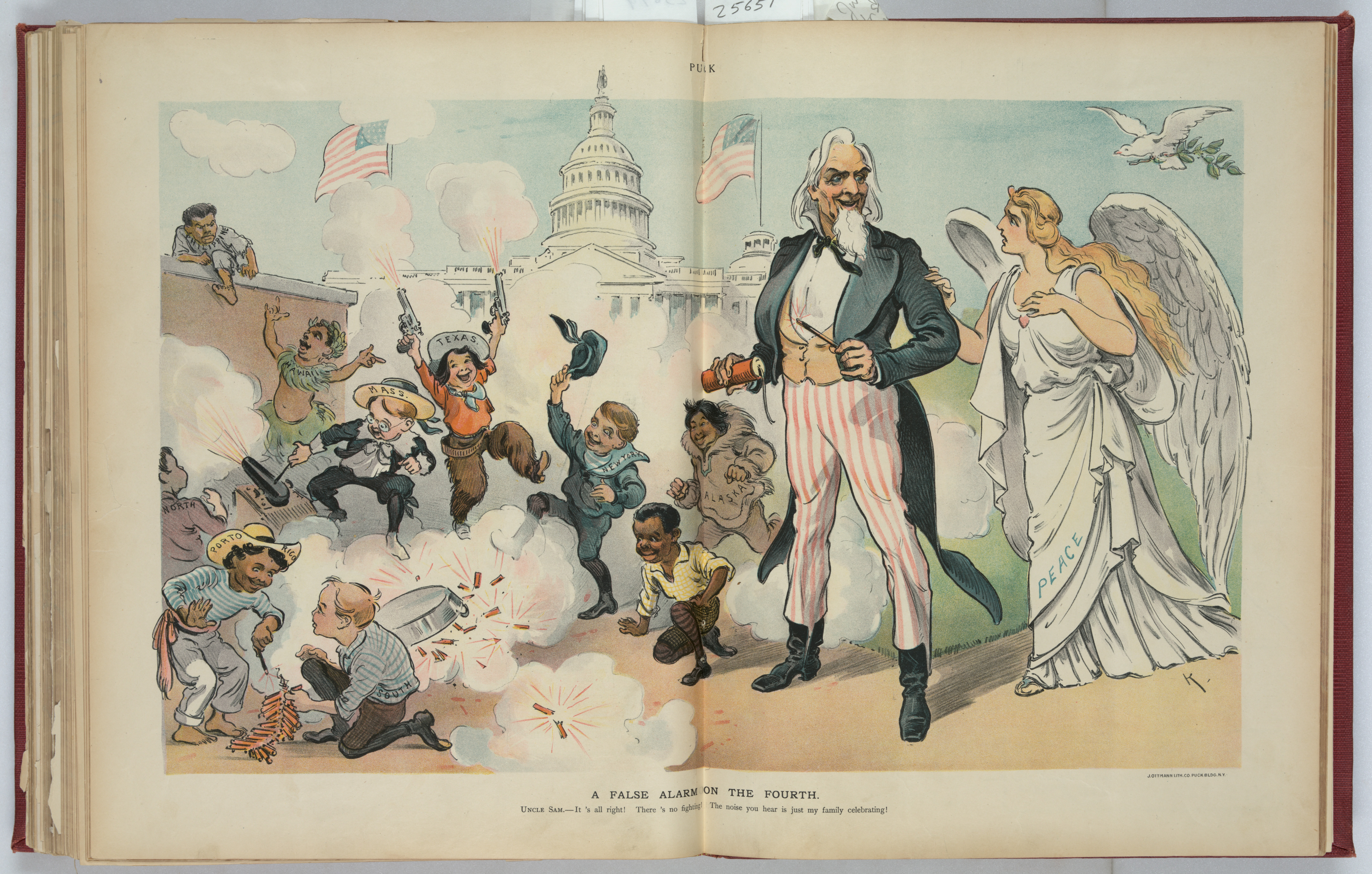
An illustration of American children celebrating noisily in a 1902 Puck cartoon

- In 1777, thirteen gunshots were fired in salute, once at morning and once again as evening fell, on July 4 in Bristol, Rhode Island. An article in the July 18, 1777, issue of The Virginia Gazette noted a celebration in Philadelphia in a manner a modern American would find familiar: an official dinner for the Continental Congress, toasts, 13-gun salutes, speeches, prayers, music, parades, troop reviews, and fireworks. Ships in port were decked with red, white, and blue bunting.
- In 1778, from his headquarters at Ross Hall, near New Brunswick, New Jersey, General George Washington marked July 4 with a double ration of rum for his soldiers and an artillery salute (feu de joie). Across the Atlantic Ocean, ambassadors John Adams and Benjamin Franklin held a dinner for their fellow Americans in Paris, France.
- In 1779, July 4 fell on a Sunday. The holiday was celebrated on Monday, July 5.
- In 1781, the Massachusetts General Court became the first state legislature to recognize July 4 as a state celebration.
- In 1783, Salem, North Carolina, held a celebration with a challenging music program assembled by Johann Friedrich Peter entitled The Psalm of Joy. The town claims it to be the first public July 4 event, as it was carefully documented by the Moravian Church, and there are no government records of any earlier celebrations.
- In 1870, the U.S. Congress made Independence Day an unpaid holiday for federal employees.
- In 1938, Congress changed Independence Day to a paid federal holiday.

== Customs ==
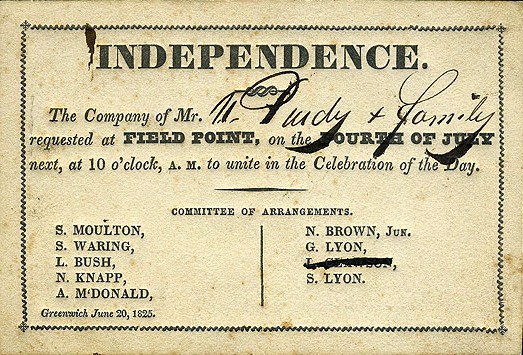
An 1825 invitation to an Independence Day celebration

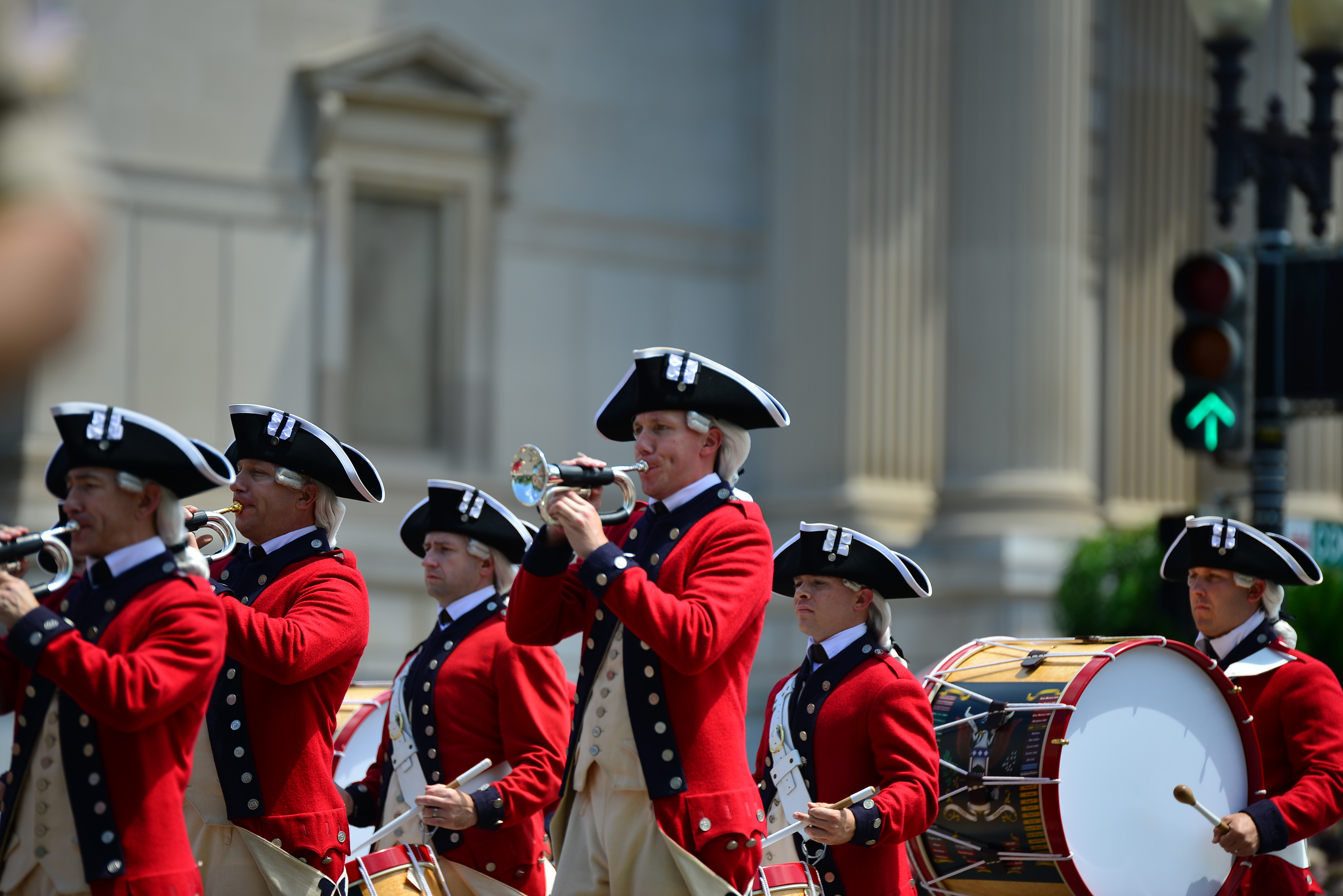
A 2014 Independence Day parade in Washington, D.C., the national capital

Independence Day is a national holiday marked by patriotic displays. Per 5 U.S.C. § 6103, Independence Day is a federal holiday, so all non-essential federal institutions (such as the postal service and federal courts) are closed on that day. While the legal holiday remains on July 4, if that date happens to be on a Saturday or Sunday, then federal government employees will instead take the day off on the adjacent Friday or Monday, respectively. Other non-essential services that are non-government related may also be closed that day.

Families often celebrate Independence Day by hosting or attending a picnic or barbecue; many take advantage of the day off and, in some years, a long weekend to gather with family members or friends. Parades are often attended in many towns and cities, some being hours-long, with many floats and participants. Parades are often held in the mid-late morning (before get-togethers), with longer spectacles sometimes extending into the early afternoon. Fireworks displays typically occur in the evening, at such places as parks, harbors, off of boats, sporting venues, fairgrounds, public shorelines, or town squares. Decorations (e.g., streamers, balloons, and clothing) are generally colored red, white, and blue, the colors of the American flag, and many homes and businesses will decorate their properties with miniature American flags.

The night before the Fourth was once the focal point of celebrations, marked by raucous gatherings, often incorporating bonfires as their highlight. In New England, towns competed to build towering pyramids, assembled from barrels and casks. They were lit at nightfall to usher in the celebration. The highest ever were in Salem, Massachusetts, with pyramids composed of as many as forty tiers of barrels. These made some of the tallest bonfires ever recorded. The custom flourished in the 19th and 20th centuries and is still practiced in some New England and northeastern towns.

Independence Day fireworks are often accompanied by patriotic songs, such as "The Star-Spangled Banner" (the American national anthem); "Columbia, the Gem of the Ocean"; "God Bless America"; "America the Beautiful"; "My Country, 'Tis of Thee"; "This Land Is Your Land"; "Stars and Stripes Forever"; "Yankee Doodle"; "God Bless the U.S.A." and "Dixie" (in southern states); "Lift Every Voice and Sing"; and occasionally (but has nominally fallen out of favor), "Hail Columbia." Some of the lyrics recall images of the Revolutionary War or the War of 1812.

Firework shows are held in many states, and many fireworks are sold for personal use or as an alternative to a public show. Safety concerns have led some states to ban fireworks or limit the sizes and types allowed. In addition, local and regional conditions may dictate whether the sale or use of fireworks in an area will be allowed; for example, the global supply chain crisis following the COVID-19 pandemic forced cancellations of shows. Some local or regional firework sales are limited or prohibited because of dry weather or other specific concerns. On these occasions the public may be prohibited from purchasing or discharging fireworks, but professional displays (such as those at sports events) may still take place.

A salute of one gun for each state in the United States, called a "salute to the union", is fired on Independence Day at noon by any capable military base.

New York City has the largest fireworks display in the country sponsored by Macy's, with more than 22 tons of pyrotechnics exploded in 2009. It generally holds displays in the East River. Other major displays are in Seattle on Lake Union; in San Diego over Mission Bay; in Boston on the Charles River; in Philadelphia over the Philadelphia Museum of Art; in San Francisco over the San Francisco Bay; and on the National Mall in Washington, D.C.

During the annual Windsor–Detroit International Freedom Festival, Detroit, Michigan, hosts one of the largest fireworks displays in North America, over the Detroit River, to celebrate Independence Day in conjunction with Windsor, Ontario's celebration of Canada Day.

The first week of July is typically one of the busiest United States travel periods of the year, as many people use what is often a three-day holiday weekend for extended vacation trips.

== Celebration gallery ==
Patriotic trailer shown in theaters celebrating July 4, 1940

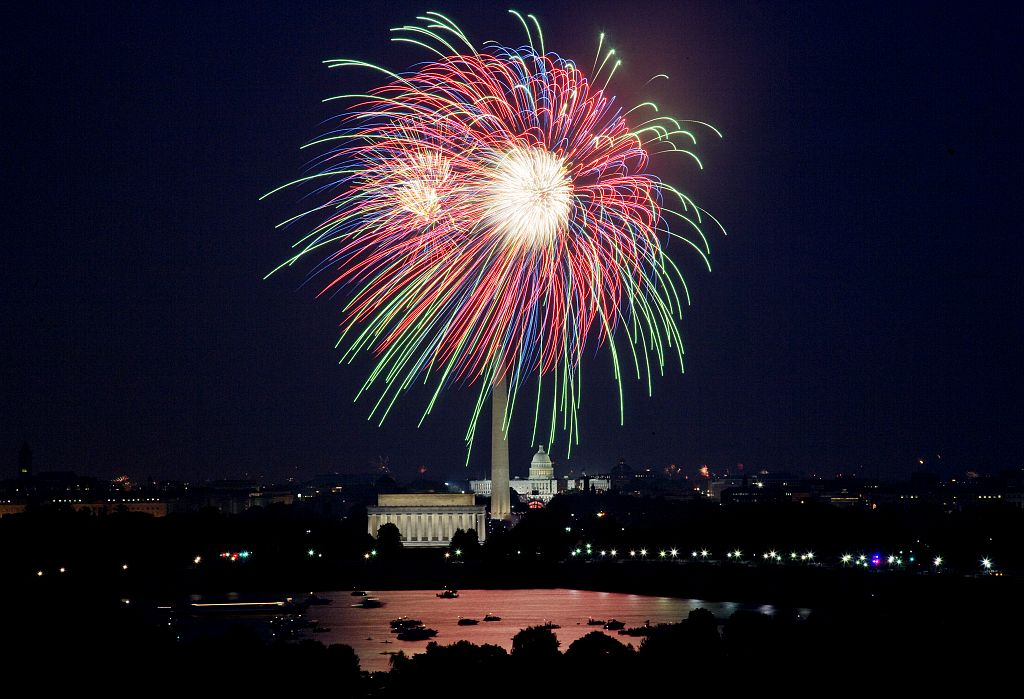
Fireworks over the National Mall in Washington, D.C., every July 4 are preceded by a concert program known as A Capitol Fourth, which takes place outside the U.S. Capitol and is televised on the American public television network PBS.

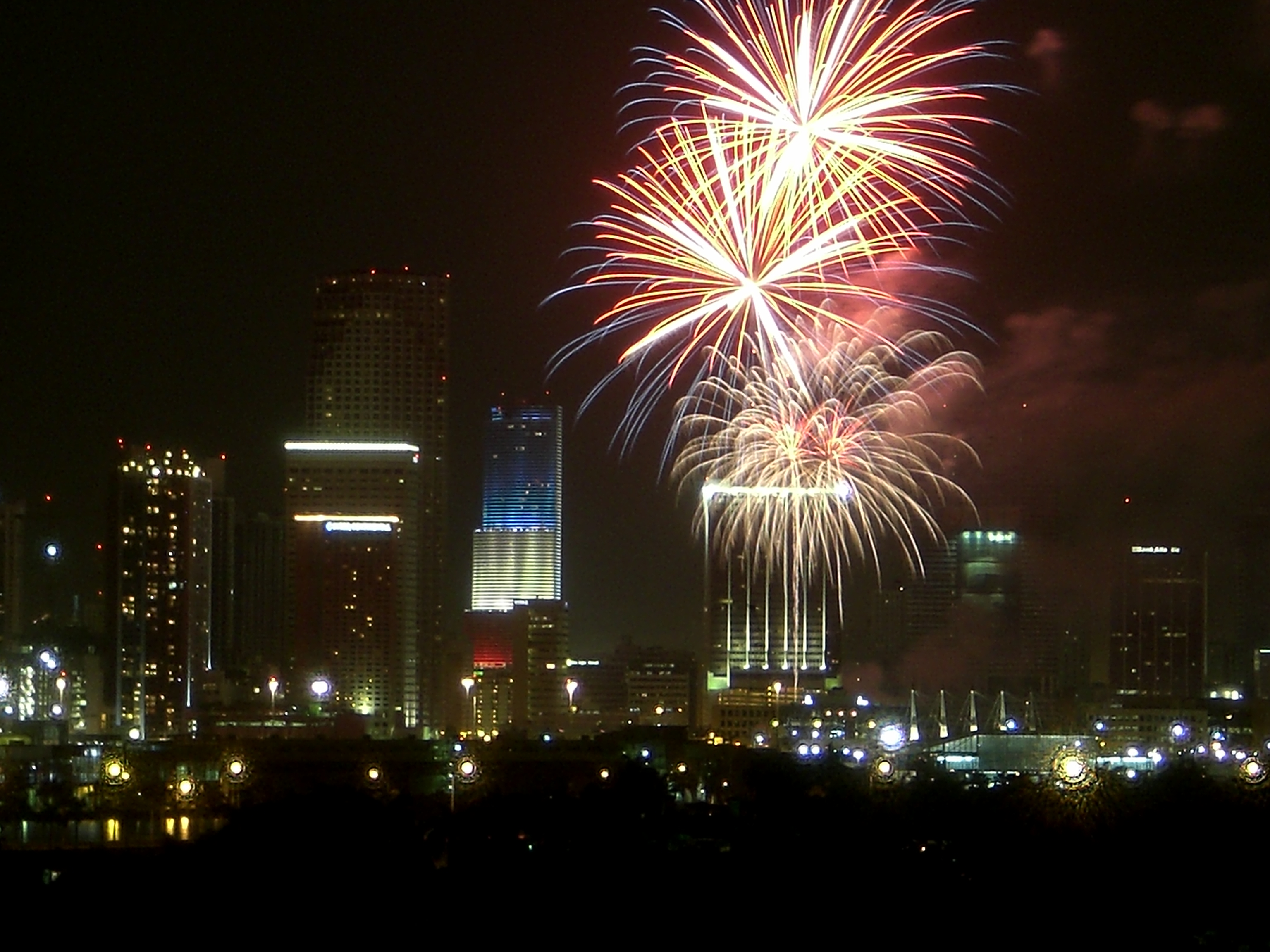
In addition to a fireworks show, Miami, Florida, lights one of its tallest buildings with the patriotic red, white and blue color scheme on Independence Day.

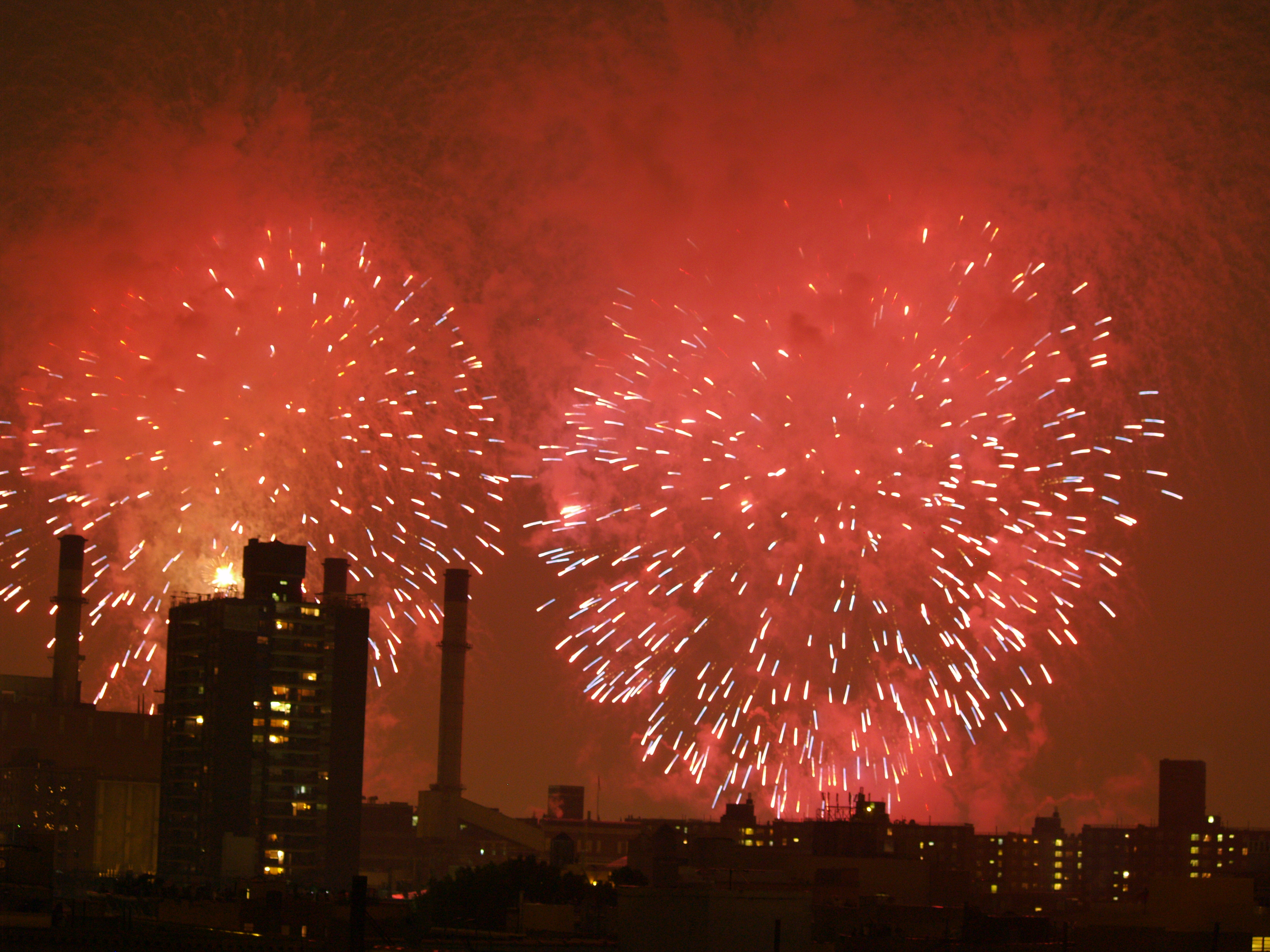
New York City's fireworks display, shown above over the East Village, is sponsored by Macy's and is the largest in the country.

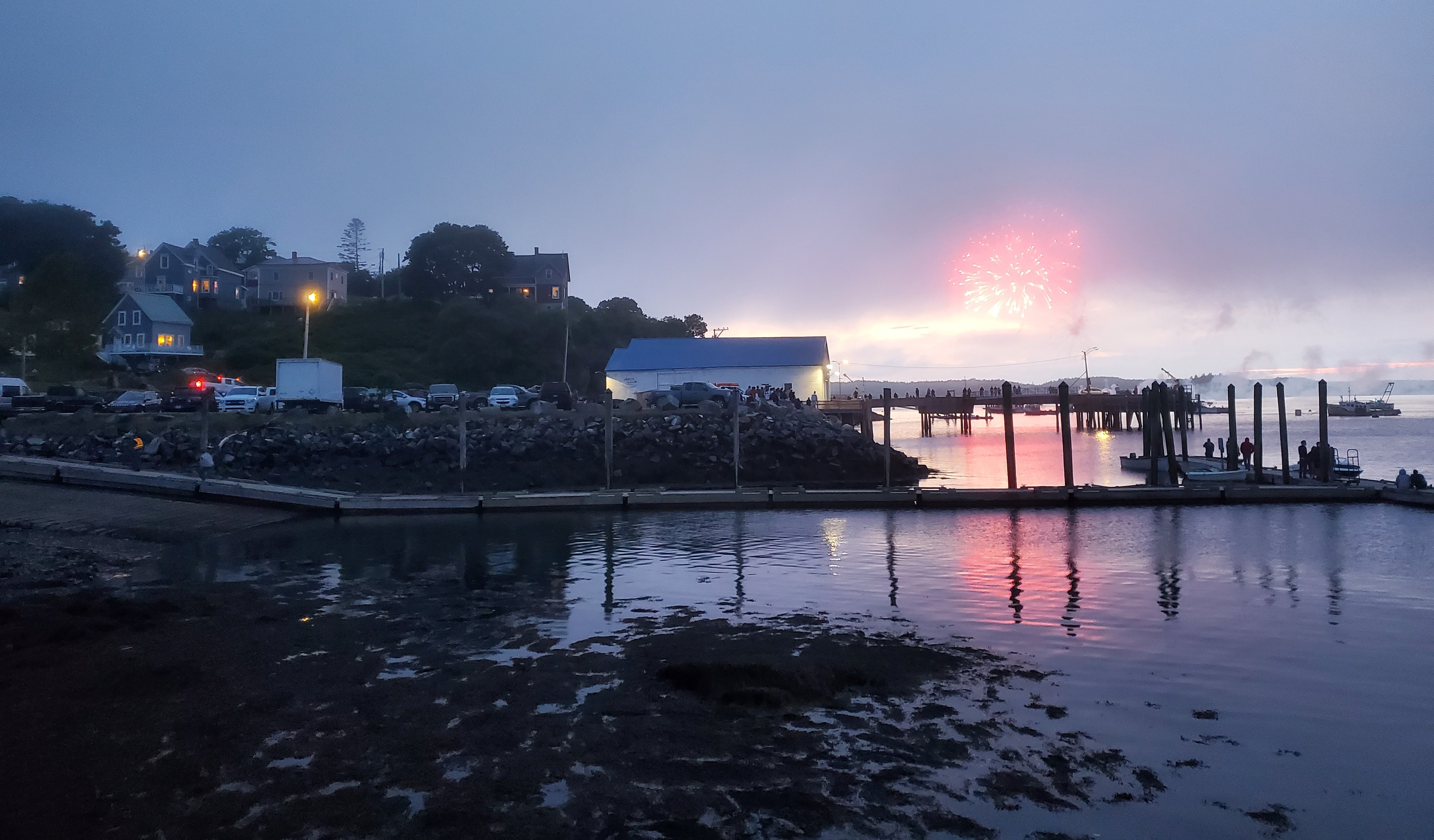
Towns of all sizes hold celebrations. Shown here is a fireworks display in America's most eastern town, Lubec, Maine, population 1,300. Canada is across the channel to the right.

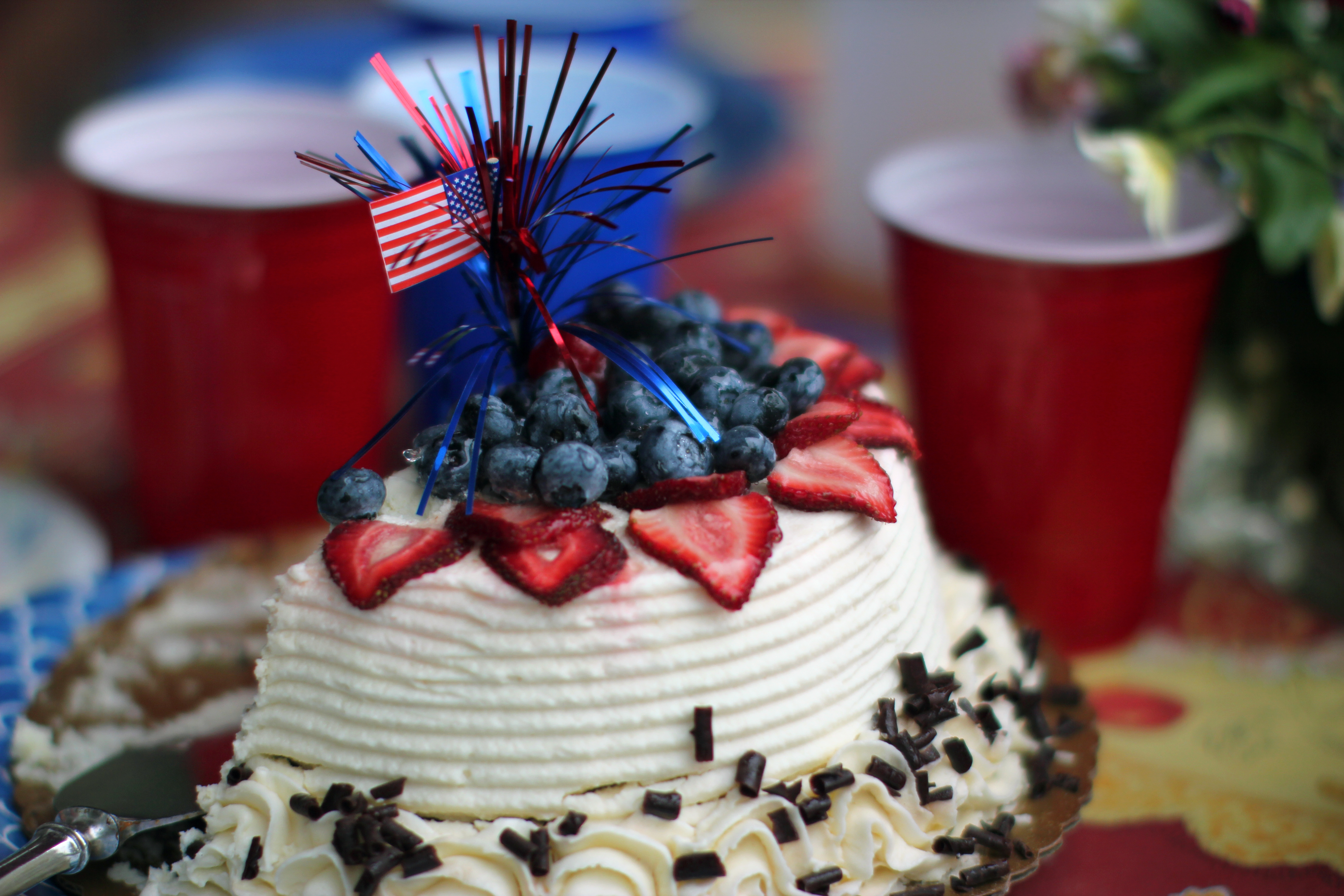
A festively decorated Independence Day cake

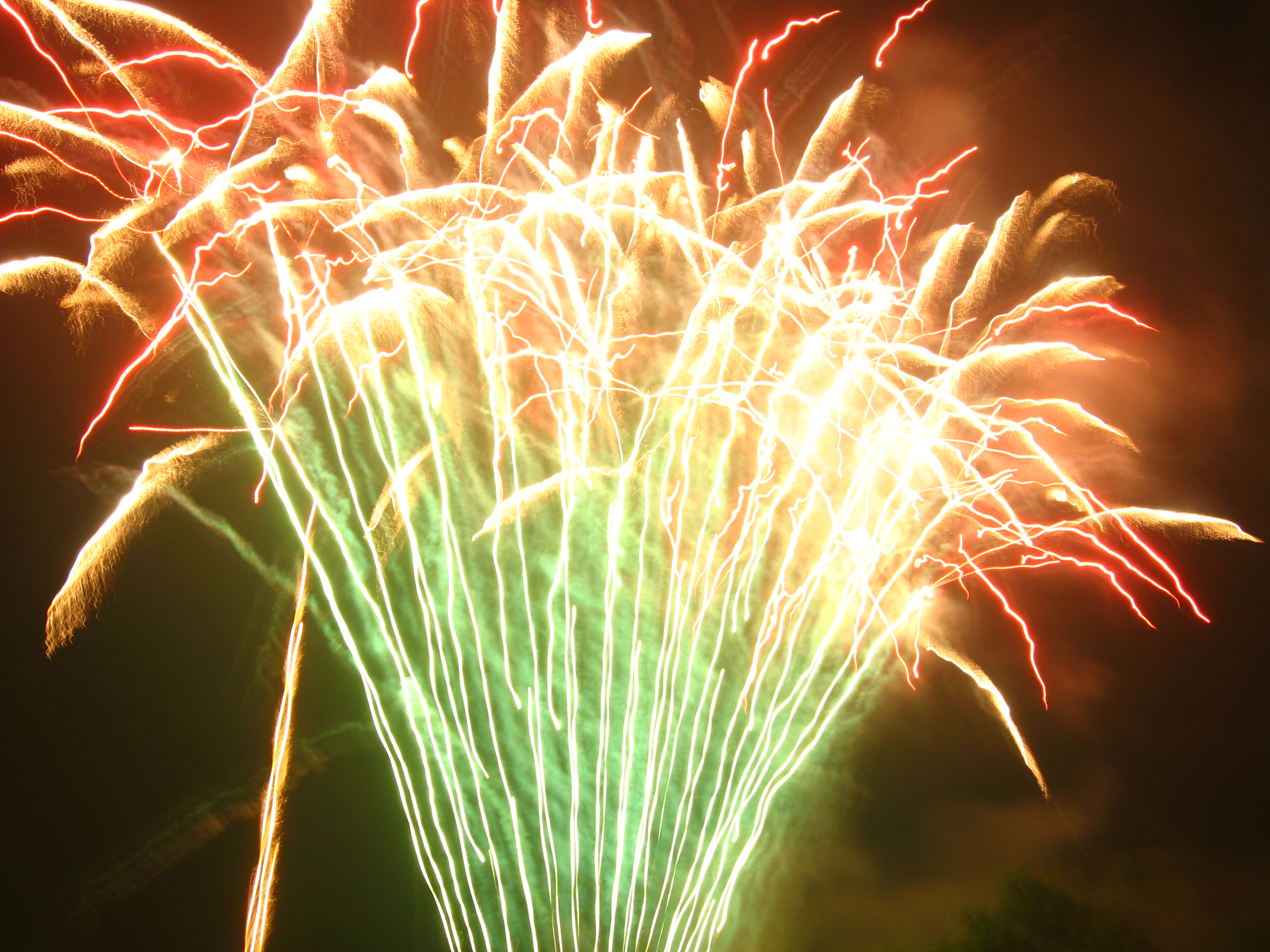
Fireworks in Narberth, Pennsylvania

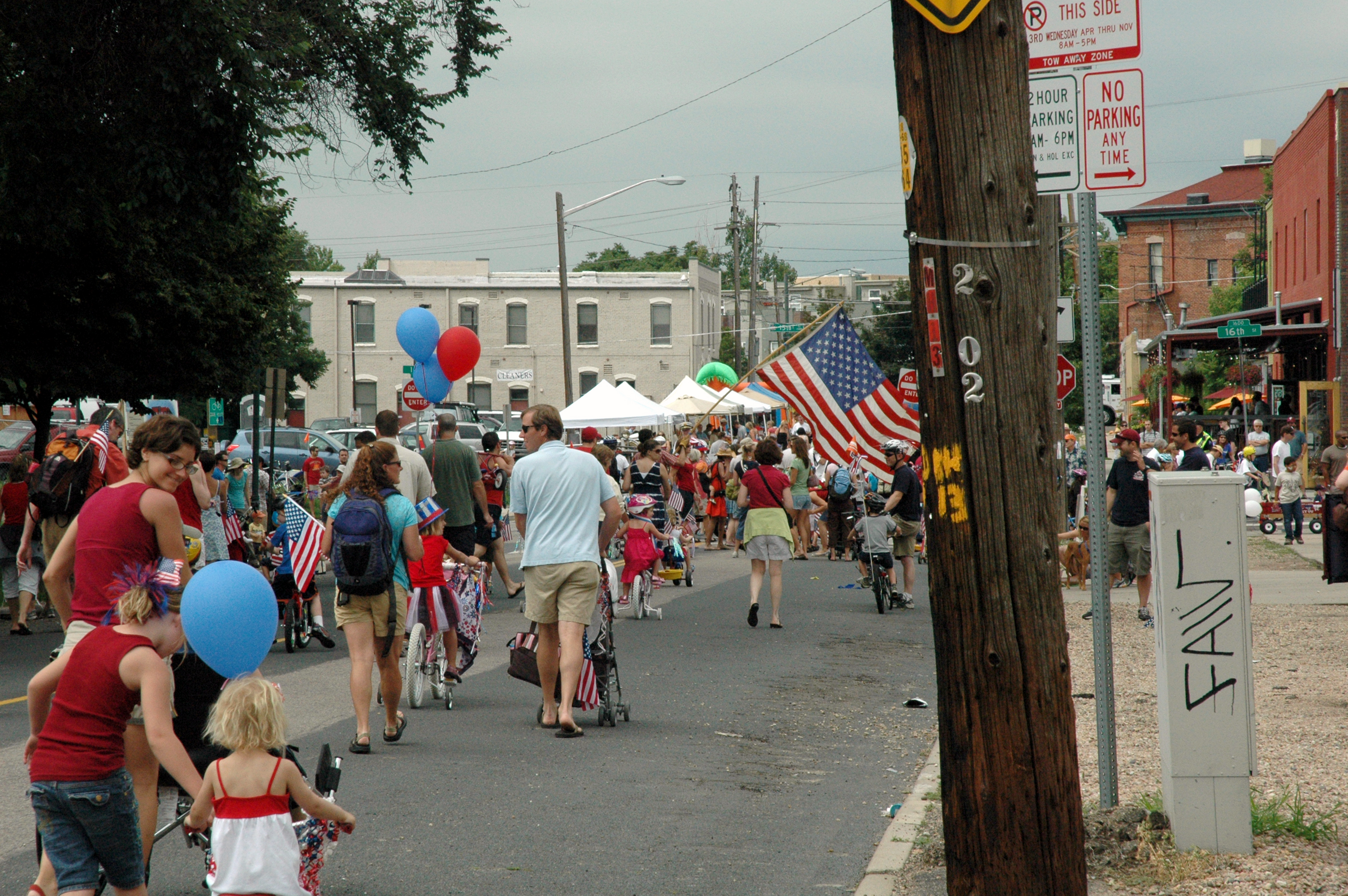
Neighborhood parade in Denver, Colorado, 2009

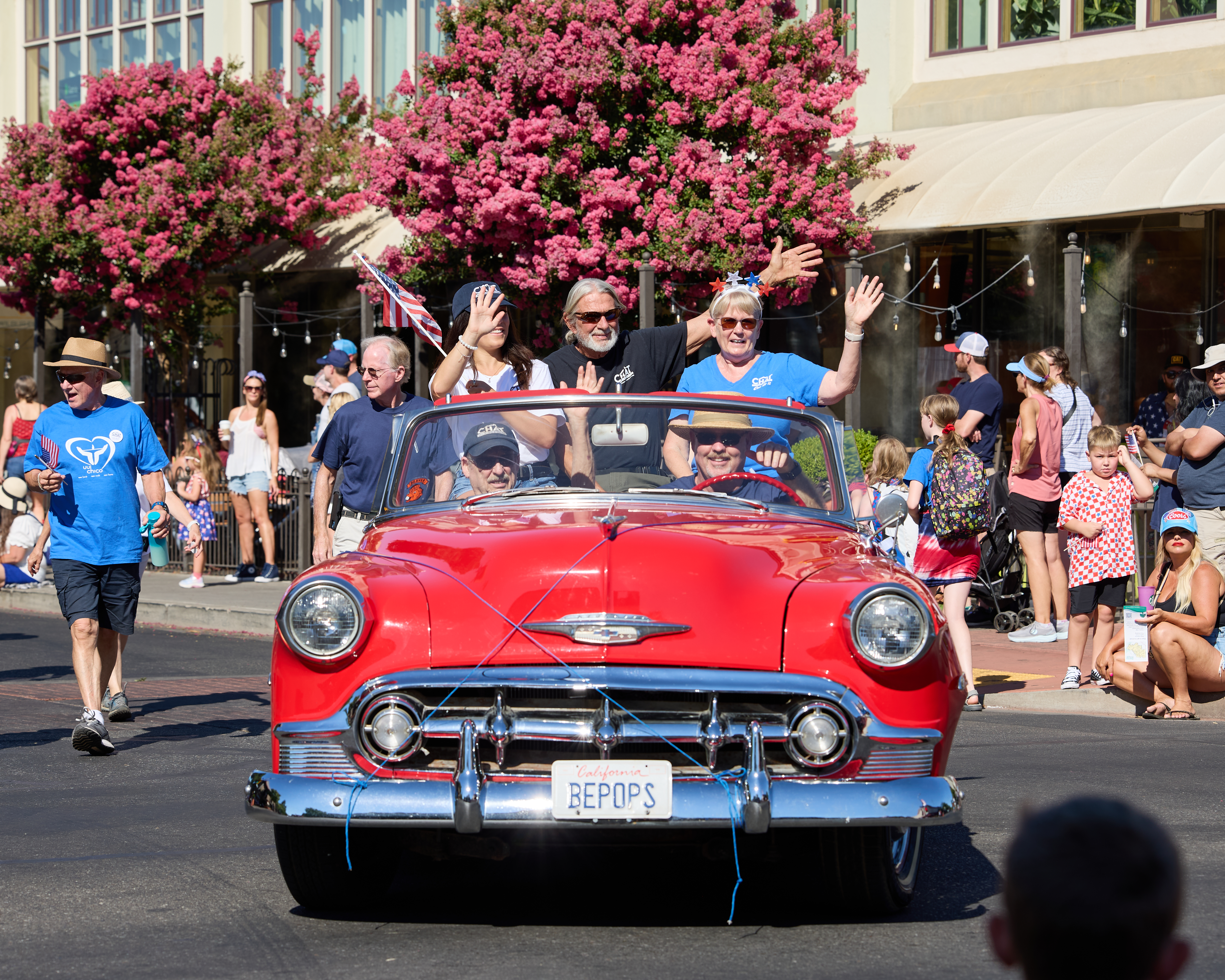
4th of July Parade in Chico, California, 2024

== Notable celebrations ==
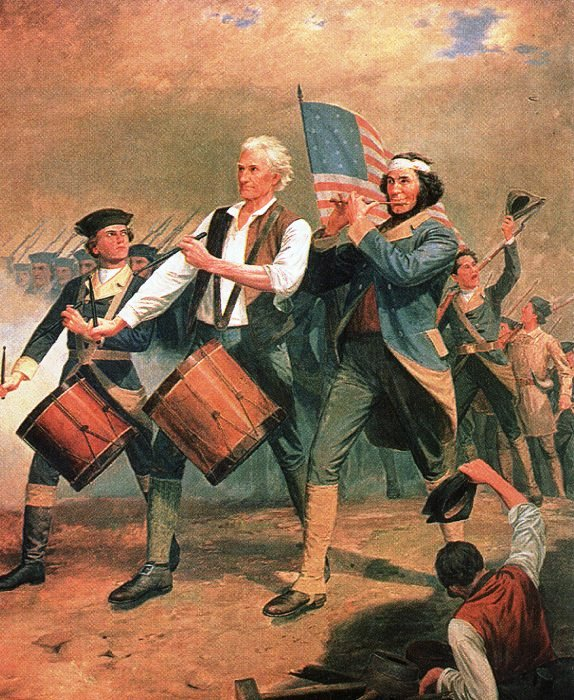
Originally called Yankee Doodle, this is one of several versions of a scene painted by A. M. Willard that came to be known as The Spirit of '76. Often imitated or parodied, it is a familiar symbol of American patriotism.

The 2019 Independence Day parade in Washington, D.C.

- Held since 1785, the Bristol Fourth of July Parade in Bristol, Rhode Island, is the oldest continuous Independence Day celebration in the United States.
- Since 1868, Seward, Nebraska, has held a celebration on the same town square. In 1979 Seward was designated "America's Official Fourth of July City-Small Town USA" by resolution of Congress. Seward has also been proclaimed "Nebraska's Official Fourth of July City" by Governor J. James Exon in proclamation. Seward is a town of 6,000 but swells to 40,000+ during the July 4 celebrations.
- Since 1912, the Rebild Society, a Danish-American friendship organization, has held a July 4 weekend festival that serves as a homecoming for Danish-Americans in the Rebild Hills of Denmark.
- Since 1959, the International Freedom Festival is jointly held in Detroit, Michigan, and Windsor, Ontario, during the last week of June each year as a mutual celebration of Independence Day and Canada Day (July 1). It culminates in a large fireworks display over the Detroit River.
- Since 1976, the famous Macy's 4th of July Fireworks display has been held annually in New York City, usually over the East River or Hudson River. Macy's did not host the event in 1986, as that year's fireworks show was held as part of Liberty Weekend, marking the restoration and centenary of the Statue of Liberty. The fireworks display has been televised nationwide on NBC, and locally on WNBC-TV since 2000.
- The Boston Pops Orchestra has hosted a music and fireworks show over the Charles River Esplanade called the "Boston Pops Fireworks Spectacular" annually since 1974. Cannons are traditionally fired during the 1812 Overture. The event was broadcast nationally from 1991 until 2002 on A&E, and since 2002 by CBS and its Boston station WBZ-TV. WBZ/1030 and WBZ-TV broadcast the entire event locally, and from 2002 through 2012, CBS broadcast the final hour of the concert nationally in primetime. The national broadcast was put on hiatus beginning in 2013, which Pops executive producer David G. Mugar believed was the result of decreasing viewership caused by NBC's encore presentation of the Macy's fireworks. The national broadcast was revived for 2016, and expanded to two hours. In 2017, Bloomberg Television took over coverage duty, with WHDH carrying local coverage beginning in 2018.
- On the Capitol lawn in Washington, D.C., A Capitol Fourth, a free concert broadcast live by PBS, NPR and the American Forces Network, precedes the fireworks and attracts over half a million people annually.

== Observance in other countries ==
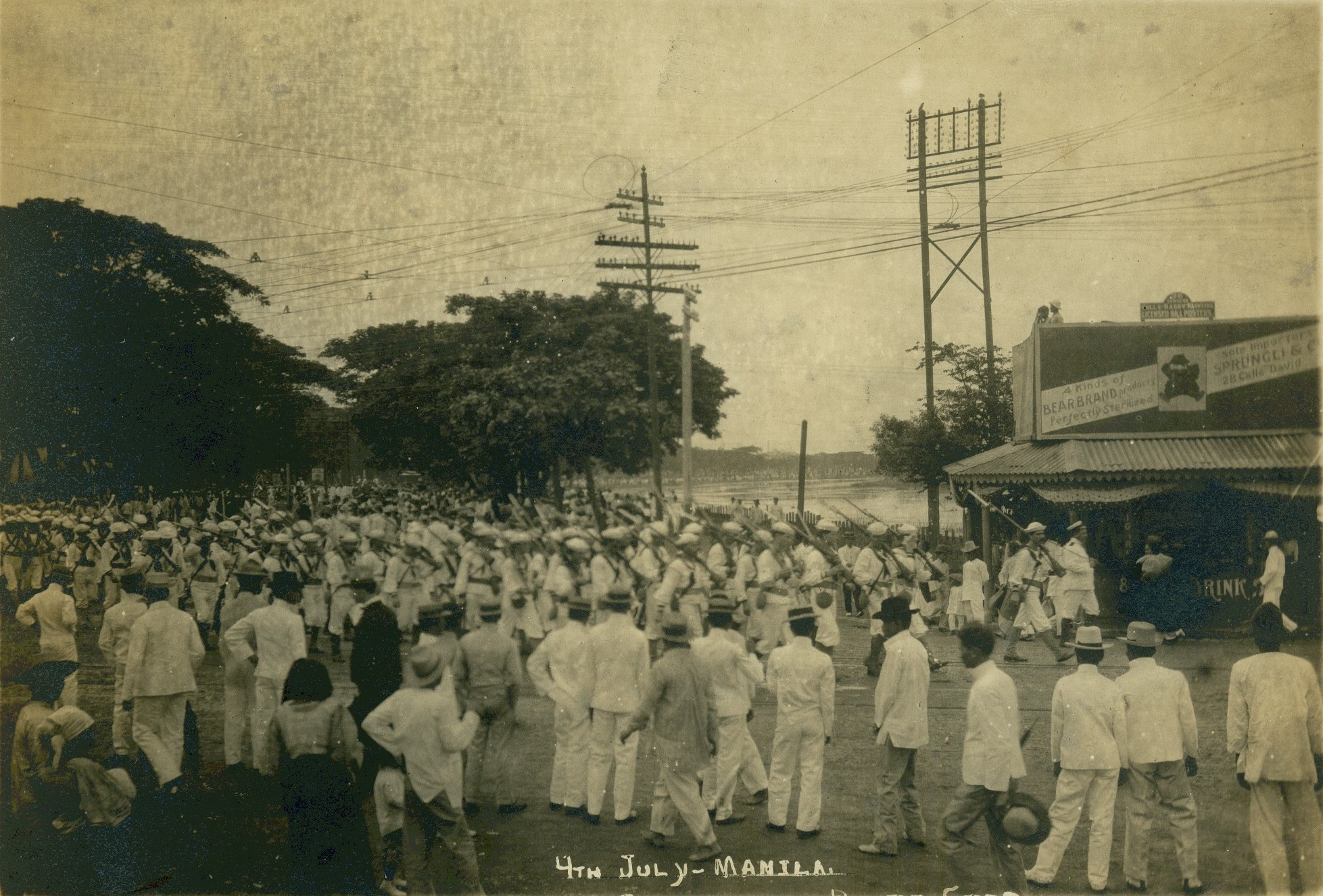
The 4th of July in Manila, Philippines, c. 1905

The Philippines celebrates July 4 as its Republic Day to commemorate the day in 1946 when it ceased to be a U.S. territory and the United States officially recognized Philippine Independence. July 4 was intentionally chosen by the United States because it corresponds to its Independence Day, and this day was observed in the Philippines as Independence Day until 1962, when President Diosdado Macapagal issued Presidential Proclamation No. 28 declaring June 12 as the country's Independence Day, shifting recognition to the 1898 declaration of independence by Filipino revolutionary forces under General Emilio Aguinaldo against Spain. In 1964, the name of the July 4 holiday was changed to Republic Day.

Rebild National Park in Denmark is said to hold the largest July 4 celebrations outside of the United States.

In the English city of Gloucester, its cathedral rang bells in 2019 and 2020 for the anthem "The Star-Spangled Banner" every July 4 for its links to the anthem, commemorating its status as the birthplace of John Stafford Smith, who composed the tune on which the anthem is based. The English town of Washington also holds an annual celebration at Washington Old Hall, a manor house associated with the ancestors of George Washington.

== See also ==
- Born on the Fourth of July – 1989 film by Oliver Stone
- Federal holidays in the United States
- Influence of the American Revolution on the French Revolution
- Juneteenth – U.S. holiday, June 19
- List of occasions known by their dates
