= Dan Hirschhorn =

American national political journalist

- Born: Philadelphia
- Education: Brandeis University
- Occupation: Journalist
- Notable credit(s): The Bulletin; PolitickerPA pa2010.com Politico

Dan Hirschhorn is an American national political journalist, who currently serves as editor-in-chief at Quartz. He previously served as deputy managing editor at the Pittsburgh Post-Gazette, senior political editor at The Philadelphia Inquirer, and director of news at Time, Inc. and Time.com.

Hirschhorn attended Brandeis University, where he was editor-in-chief of the Brandeis independent student newspaper, The Justice. Following graduation, he worked as a journalist for The Bulletin in Philadelphia. He was the "Philly-based half" of PolitickerPA, a political news website operated by The New York Observer media company.

Hirschhorn also founded pa2010.com, a website dedicated to the 2010 election cycle in Pennsylvania, and worked at Politico.
