= List of occasions known by their dates =

Many occasions, such as holidays and events, are named after or commonly referred to by the calendar day on which they fall.

== Holidays ==
Date	Name	Other names	Observed in	Description	Ref.
ט״ו בִּשְׁבָט	Tu BiShvat		Israel, and by Jews worldwide	Hebrew for "15th of Shevat." The Jewish "new year of trees," a celebration of the Earth and of nature.	
March 15	Ides of March	—	Ancient Rome	Day noted for various religious festivities, and the anniversary of Julius Caesar's assassination.	
April 1	April Fool's Day	—	Worldwide	Observance known for hoaxes and pranks.	
April 20	420	—	Worldwide	An informal observance celebrating the recreational use of cannabis.	
April 25	25 de Abril	Freedom Day	Portugal	Commemorates the Carnation Revolution that ended the dictatorship and paved the way for democracy.	
May 1	May Day	International Workers' Day	Worldwide	Ancient spring festival and labor celebration commemorating the eight-hour day.	
May 5	Cinco de Mayo	—	United States, Mexico	Spanish for "fifth of May". Commemorates the Mexican army's victory over French forces at the Battle of Puebla on May 5, 1862.	
May 9	9 May	Victory Day	Russia, Israel, and many other nations	Marks the capitulation of Nazi Germany to the Soviet Union in World War II on 8 May 1945.	
May 24	May Two-Four	Victoria Day (French: Fête de la Reine)	Canada	Celebrates the birthday of Queen Victoria and the current reigning Canadian Monarch. Observed on the last Monday preceding May 25.	
June 19	Juneteenth	Emancipation Day	United States	Commemorates the end of slavery in Texas as a result of the Emancipation Proclamation.	
July 4	Fourth of July	Independence Day	United States	Commemorates the United States' adoption of the Declaration of Independence on July 4, 1776.	
ט׳ באב	The Ninth of Av	Tisha B'Av	Israel, and by Jews worldwide	An annual fast day in Judaism which commemorates the anniversary of a number of disasters in Jewish history.	
(see description)	Double Ninth Festival	Chung Yeung Festival	China, Vietnam, Korea	A traditional Chinese holiday observed on the 9th day of the 9th month in the Chinese calendar.	
October 10	Double Ten Day	National Celebration Day	Republic of China (Taiwan)	National day of Taiwan, commemorating the start of the Wuchang Uprising on October 10, 1911.	
November 5	Fifth of November	Guy Fawkes Night	England, some Commonwealth nations	Commemorates the arrest of Gunpowder Plot conspirator Guy Fawkes on 5 November 1605.	

== Historical events ==
Date	Name	Other names	Description	Ref.
June 1, 1794	Glorious First of June	Third Battle of Ushant	A naval battle between Great Britain and France during the French Revolutionary Wars.	
March 31, 1909	31 March Incident	—	Political crisis within the Ottoman Empire in April 1909, during the Second Constitutional Era.	
March 1, 1919	March 1st Movement	—	Korean independence movement.	
May 4, 1919	May Fourth Movement	—	Chinese sociopolitical movement originating from protests that occurred on May 4, 1919.	
May 30, 1925	May Thirtieth Movement	—	Major labor and anti-imperialist movement during the middle-period of the Republic of China era.	
April 12, 1927	Shanghai massacre	April 12 Incident	Violent suppression of Chinese Communist Party organizations and leftist elements in Shanghai by forces supporting General Chiang Kai-shek and conservative factions in the Kuomintang.	
January 28, 1932	January 28 incident	—	Conflict between the Republic of China and the Empire of Japan.	
May 15, 1932	May 15 incident	—	Attempted coup d'état in the Empire of Japan.	
December 9, 1935	December 9th Movement	—	Mass protest led by students in Beiping to demand that the Chinese government actively resist Japanese aggression.	
February 26, 1936	February 26 incident	2/26	Attempted coup d'état in the Empire of Japan.	
July 7, 1937	Marco Polo Bridge Incident	July 7 Incident	Battle during July 1937 in the district of Beijing between China's National Revolutionary Army and the Imperial Japanese Army.	
July 20, 1944	20 July plot	—	Attempted assassination of Adolf Hitler.	
February 28, 1947	February 28 incident	—	Anti-government uprising in Taiwan that was violently suppressed by the Kuomintang–led nationalist government of the Republic of China.	
October 17, 1952	17 October affair	—	Event during which Indonesian soldiers pressured the president to disband the Provisional People's Representative Council.	
September 30, 1965	30 September Movement	—	Self-proclaimed organization of Indonesian National Armed Forces members who, in the early hours of 1 October 1965, assassinated six Indonesian Army generals in an abortive coup d'état.	
May 13, 1969	13 May incident	—	Episode of Sino-Malay sectarian violence that took place in Kuala Lumpur, the capital of Malaysia.	
April 19, 1970	19th of April Movement	—	Colombian urban guerrilla movement active in the late 1970s and 1980s, named after the 1970 Colombian general election.	
November 20, 1936 and 1975	20-N	—	Deaths of José Antonio Primo de Rivera, Falange Española, and Francisco Franco.	
May 13, 1985	1985 MOVE bombing	—	Police standoff with the Black power group MOVE that culminated in an airstrike and the collateral destruction of residential homes in Cobbs Creek, Philadelphia.	
June 4, 1989	1989 Tiananmen Square protests and massacre	June Fourth Incident	Chinese pro-democracy protests that ended in a violent government crackdown	
April 19, 1995	Oklahoma City bombing	—	A car bomb attack in the Alfred P. Murrah Federal Building, and remains the deadliest act of domestic terrorism in U.S. history.	
September 11, 2001	September 11th	9/11	Four coordinated suicide attacks by plane hijacking upon the United States by Islamist militant group al-Qaeda.	
March 11, 2004	2004 Madrid train bombings	11M	Series of coordinated, nearly simultaneous bombings against the Cercanías commuter train system of Madrid, Spain.	
July 7, 2005	7 July 2005 London bombings	7/7	Series of four coordinated suicide attacks carried out by Islamic terrorists in London that targeted commuters travelling on the city's public transport system.	
March 23, 2009	March 23 Movement	M23	Rebel military group that is for the most part formed of ethnic Tutsi, based in eastern areas of the Democratic Republic of the Congo.	
March 11, 2011	2011 Tōhoku earthquake and tsunami	3/11	Earthquake and tsunami in the Tōhoku region of Japan.	
July 22, 2011	2011 Norway attacks	22. juli	A car bomb attack on Regjeringskvartalet in Oslo, Norway, followed by a shooting massacre on Utøya.	
January 20, 2017	DisruptJ20	—	An organization that protested and attempted to disrupt events of the presidential inauguration of the 45th U.S. President, Donald Trump.	
January 6, 2021	January 6 United States Capitol attack	January 6th, J6	Attack on the United States Capitol by supporters of President Trump to prevent the counting of electoral college votes from the recent presidential election.	
October 7, 2023	2023 Hamas-led attack on Israel	October 7		

== See also ==
- Sansculottides: Six complementary days added to the French Republican Calendar to celebrate various virtues and the French Revolution.
