= Cinco de Mayo =

Annual celebration held on May 5

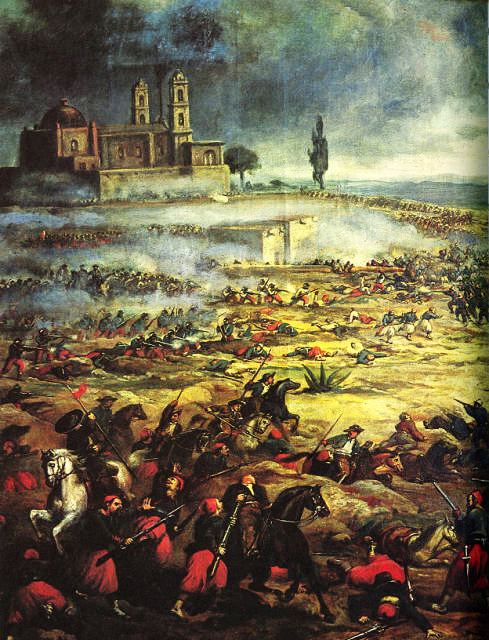
- Battle of Puebla, 5th May 1862, by Francisco P. Miranda
- Also called: El Día de la Batalla de Puebla
- Observed by: Mexicans (especially in Puebla), Mexican Americans, and people of non-Mexican heritage
- Type: Historical, national, ethnic, cultural
- Significance: Celebration of the Mexican victory over French forces at the Battle of Puebla, on May 5, 1862
- Celebrations: Parades, food, music, folkloric dancing, battle reenactments
- Date: May 5
- Next time: May 5, 2027
- Frequency: Annual

Cinco de Mayo (Mexican Spanish: [ˈsiŋko ðe ˈmaʝo]; Spanish for 'Fifth of May') is an annual celebration held on May 5 to celebrate Mexico's victory over the Second French Empire at the Battle of Puebla in 1862, led by General Ignacio Zaragoza. Zaragoza died months after the battle from an illness, however, and a larger French force ultimately defeated the Mexican army at the Second Battle of Puebla and then occupied Mexico City. Following the end of the American Civil War in 1865, the United States began lending money and guns to the Mexican Liberals, pushing France and Mexican Conservatives to the edge of defeat. At the opening of the French chambers in January 1866, Napoleon III announced that he would withdraw French troops from Mexico. In reply to a French request for American neutrality, the American secretary of state William H. Seward replied that French withdrawal from Mexico should be unconditional.

More popular in the United States than in Mexico, Cinco de Mayo has become associated with the celebration of Mexican-American culture. Celebrations began in Columbia, California, where they have been observed annually since 1862. The day gained nationwide popularity beyond those of Mexican-American heritage in the 1980s due to advertising campaigns by beer, wine, and tequila companies; today, Cinco de Mayo generates beer sales on par with the Super Bowl. In Mexico, the commemoration of the battle continues to be mostly ceremonial, such as through military parades or battle reenactments. The city of Puebla marks the event with various festivals and reenactments of the battle.

Cinco de Mayo is sometimes mistaken for Mexican Independence Day—the most important national holiday in Mexico—which is celebrated on September 16, commemorating the Grito de Dolores ("Cry of Dolores") in 1810, which initiated the Mexican War of Independence from Spain. Cinco de Mayo has been referenced and featured in entertainment media, and has become an increasingly global celebration of Mexican culture, cuisine, and heritage.

== Context ==
=== Events before the Battle of Puebla ===
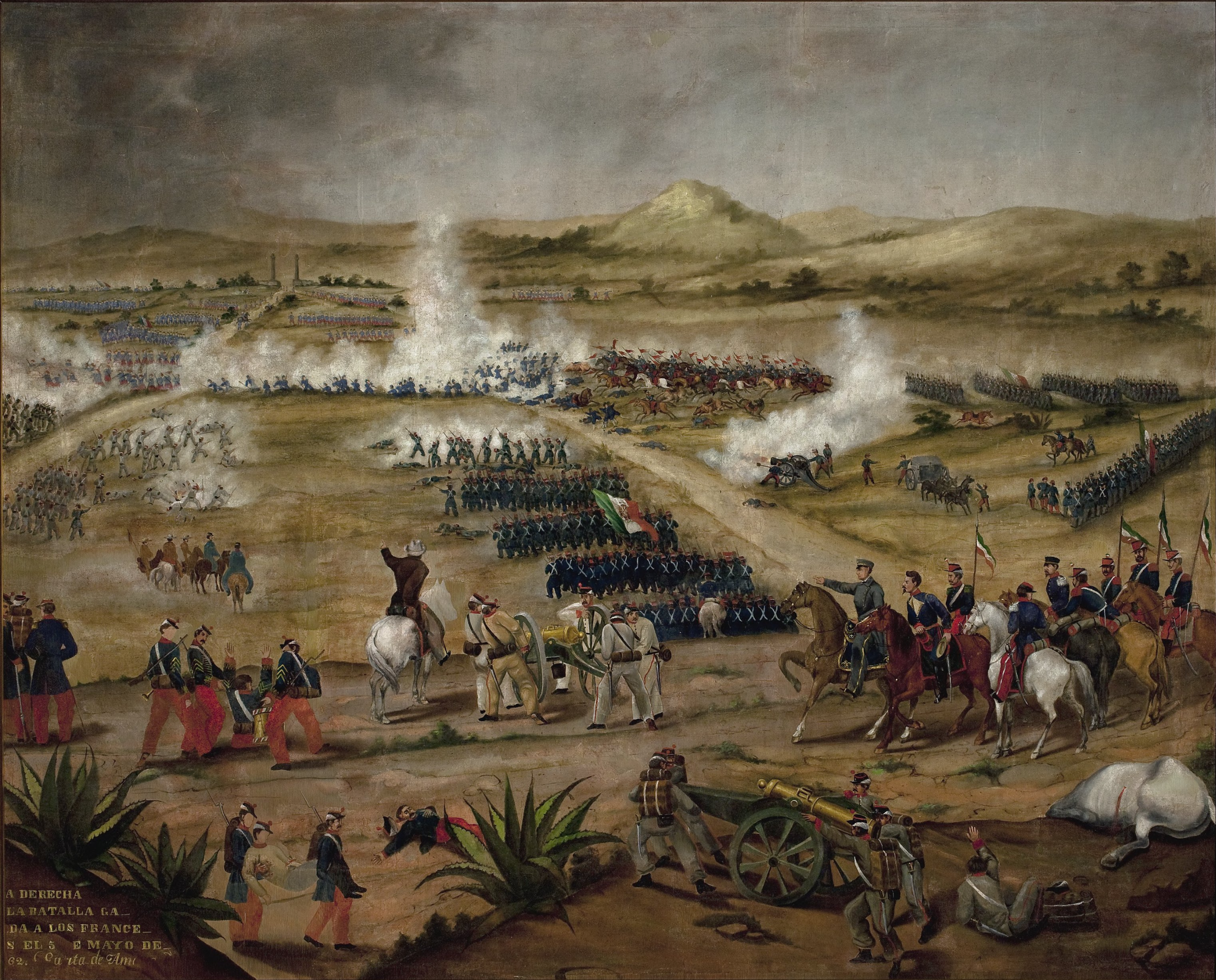
Anonymous painting of the Battle of Puebla, located at the Museo Nacional de las Intervenciones

Cinco de Mayo has its roots in the second French intervention in Mexico, which took place in the aftermath of the 1846–48 Mexican–American War and the 1858–61 Reform War. The Reform War was a civil war that pitted Liberals (who believed in separation of church and state and freedom of religion) against Conservatives (who favored a tight bond between the Catholic Church and the Mexican state). These wars nearly bankrupted the Mexican Treasury. On July 17, 1861, Mexican President Benito Juárez issued a moratorium in which all foreign debt payments would be suspended for two years. In response, France, Spain, and the United Kingdom held a convention in London and joined in alliance to send naval forces to Veracruz to demand reimbursement. France, at the time ruled by Napoleon III, decided to use the opportunity to establish an empire in Mexico that would favor French interests, whereupon Britain and Spain negotiated with Mexico and peacefully withdrew. The empire was part of an envisioned "Latin America" (term used to imply cultural kinship of the region with France) that would rebuild French influence in the American continent and exclude Anglophone American territories.

=== Battle of Puebla and victory ===
Late in 1861, a well-armed French fleet attacked Veracruz, landing a large French force and driving President Juárez and his government into retreat. Moving on from Veracruz towards Mexico City, the French army encountered heavy resistance from the Mexicans close to Puebla, at the Mexican forts of Loreto and Guadalupe. The French army of 6,500–8,000 attacked the poorly equipped Mexican army of 4,000. (Note: According to Mexico's National Institute of Historical Studies on the Mexican Revolution the Mexican force consisted of 4,802 soldiers. And Peter Hicks of the French Foundation Napoléon and other French sources state the size of the Mexican force was 12,000 men. . Hayes-Batista clarifies on page 60 of his El Cinco de Mayo: An American Tradition that after the smaller Mexican force had defeated the French on May 5, they received reinforcements on May 6 and 7 of approximately 12,000 additional Mexican soldiers.) On May 5, 1862, the Mexicans decisively defeated the French army. The victory represented a significant morale boost to the Mexican army and the Mexican people at large and helped to establish a sense of national unity and patriotism.

=== Events after the Battle of Puebla ===
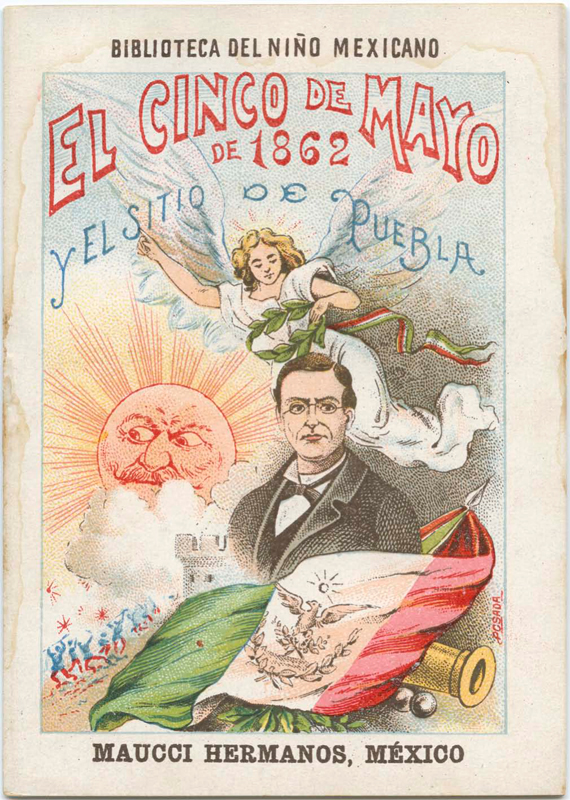
Cover of May 5, 1862 and the siege of Puebla, 1901, from the Biblioteca del Niño Mexicano, a series of booklets for children detailing the history of Mexico

The Mexican victory, however, was short-lived. A year later, with 30,000 troops, the French were able to defeat the Mexican army, capture Mexico City, and install Emperor Maximilian I as ruler of Mexico. Maximilian's rule lasted only three years, from 1864 to 1867. By 1865, "with the American Civil War now over, the U.S. began to provide more political and military assistance to Mexico to expel the French." After the American Civil War's end, Napoleon III, facing a persistent Mexican guerilla resistance, the threat of war with Prussia, and "the prospect of a serious scrap with the United States", began withdrawing French troops from Mexico in 1866. The Mexicans recaptured Mexico City, and Maximilian I was apprehended and executed, along with his Mexican generals Miguel Miramón and Tomás Mejía Camacho in Cerro de las Campanas, Querétaro. "On June 5, 1867, Benito Juárez entered Mexico City where he installed a new government organizing his administration."

=== Significance ===
The Battle of Puebla was significant, both nationally and internationally, for several reasons. First, "This battle was significant in that the 4,000 Mexican soldiers were greatly outnumbered by the well-equipped French army of 8,000 that had not been defeated for almost 50 years." (Note: It has been pointed out that, contrary to reports on PBS and in Philadelphia's The Bulletin, the French were in fact considered to have been defeated by the Russians at the Siege of Petropavlovsk in 1854.) Second, since the overall failed French intervention, The Bulletin has argued that no country in the Americas has subsequently been invaded by any other military force from another continent. Historian Justo Sierra has suggested in his Political Evolution of the Mexican People that, had Mexico not defeated the French in Puebla on May 5, 1862, France would have gone to the aid of the Confederate States of America in the American Civil War and the United States' destiny could have been different.

== History of the holiday in Mexico ==
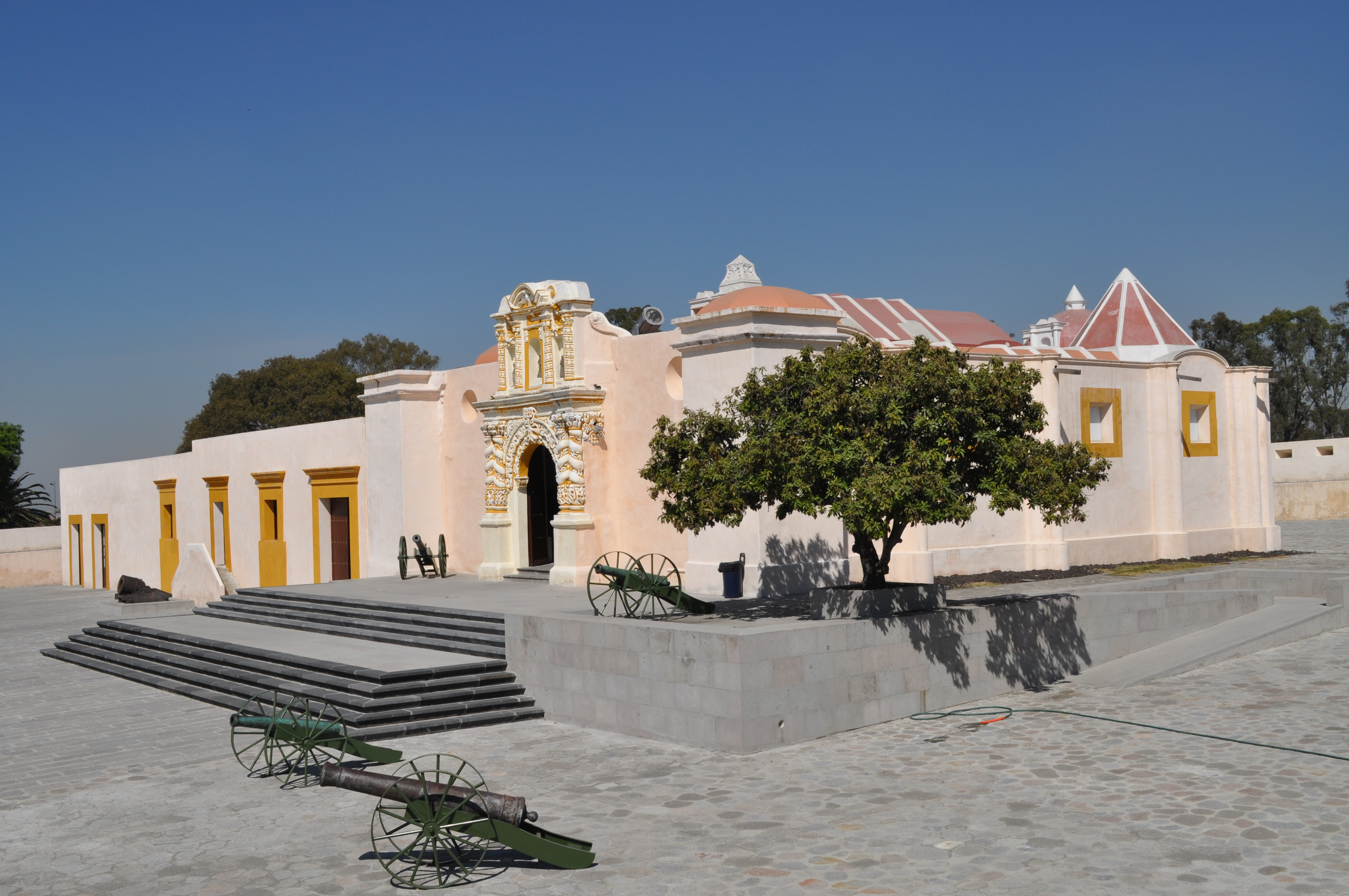
The former forts of Guadalupe and Loreto now house a museum.

On May 9, 1862, President Juárez declared that the anniversary of the Battle of Puebla would be a national holiday regarded as "Battle of Puebla Day" or "Battle of Cinco de Mayo".

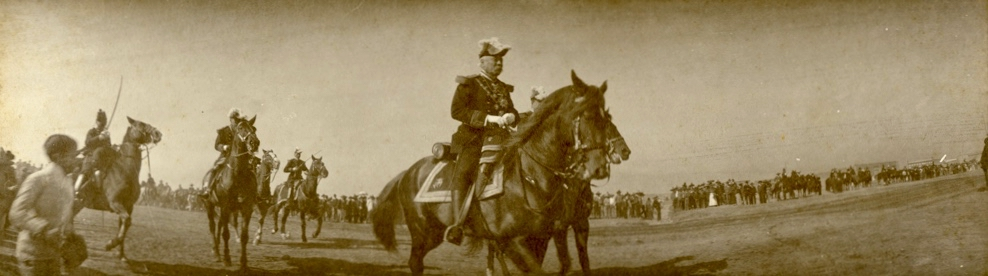
Porfirio Díaz leading Mexican troops in celebration of Cinco de Mayo in 1902

The national celebration of the day peaked during the Porfiriato, the period of Mexican history corresponding with the dictatorship of President Porfirio Díaz, who had fought in the Battle of Puebla as a young officer. According to historian Kelly Lytle Hernández, Díaz "strategically turned the Cinco de Mayo Festival or celebration into a celebration of his power and his reign and made it something that was celebrated across Mexico and even in diasporic Mexican communities in the United States." Because of this association, in much of Mexico, Cinco de Mayo celebrations declined after Díaz was deposed in the Mexican Revolution.

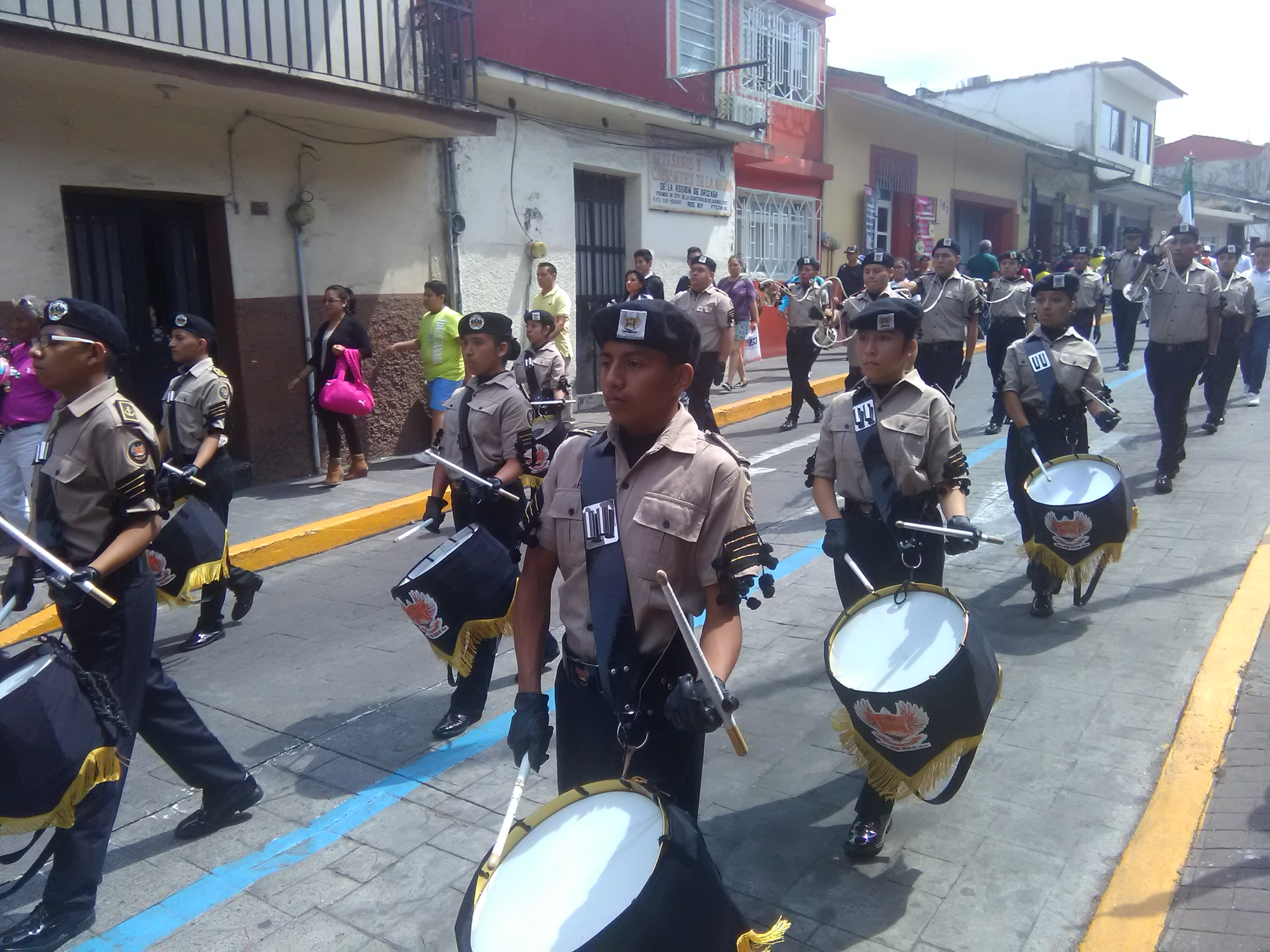
Cinco de Mayo parade in Orizaba, Veracruz, 2017

Today, the commemoration of the battle is not observed as a national holiday in Mexico (i.e. not a statutory holiday). However, all public schools are closed nationwide in Mexico on May 5. The day is an official holiday in the State of Puebla, where the Battle took place, and also a full holiday (no work) in the neighboring State of Veracruz.

In Puebla, historical reenactments, parades, and meals take place to commemorate the battle. Parade participants dress as French and Mexican soldiers to reenact the battle. Every year the city also hosts the Festival Internacional de Puebla, which gathers national and international artists, traditional musicians and dancers, as well as the Festival Internacional del Mole, with an emphasis on the city's iconic mole poblano.

In Mexico City, military commemoration is occasionally held at the Campo Marte. A street, Avenida Cinco de Mayo, in the Historic Center of Mexico City was named after the battle in 1862 by Benito Juárez.

== History of the holiday in United States ==
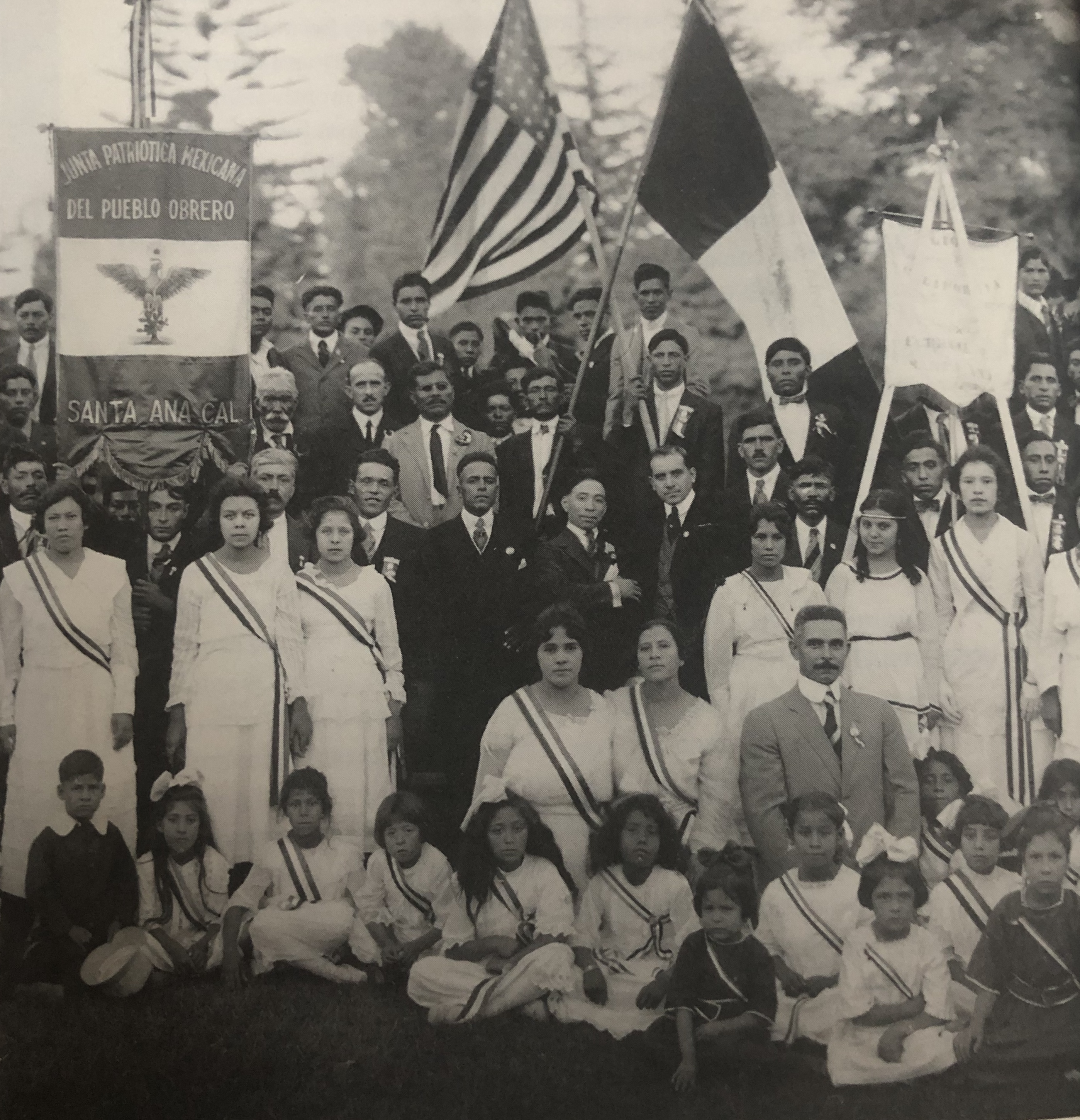
Junta Patriótica Mexicana del Pueblo Obrero, Santa Ana, California, 1919

Remembrance of Cinco de Mayo, began, in the 1860s, by Latinos in California, Nevada, Oregon, and Texas in the context of the Latino experience of the Mexican Independence Day, Mexican Declaration of Independence, and the American Civil War in the Far West and Mexico.

The Chicano movement began commemorating Cinco de Mayo in the second half of the twentieth century.. The holiday was also celebrated by Mexican-American communities as a way to recognize their culture and history, with celebrations including dancing, music, and parades. The celebration became a way for Mexican-Americans to connect with their heritage. These events helped Mexican-American communities celebrate their culture and remember the history behind the holiday.

According to David E. Hayes-Bautista, author of El Cinco de Mayo: An American Tradition, there is evidence that, in 1862, the same year the battle took place, the Mexican community in California started celebrating the victory of Cinco de Mayo. La Voz de Méjico (San Francisco, California, Spanish, 1862–1866) published detailed accounts of the battle. On 7 June 1862, La Voz de Méjico reported that a Cinco de Mayo celebration took place on May 22 in the town of Columbia, California. Attendees toasted to their fellow Mexican's victory and sang patriotic songs.

Back in California, Mexican Americans followed the news in Spanish language newspapers and were thrilled by Mexico's victory. It led them to form political organizations — Juntas Patrióticas Mejicanas — which met monthly and raised money to send to Mexico's President Juarez to aid his fight against the French. There would eventually be 129 Juntas, mostly in California. When the groups got together, speakers used the Battle of Puebla as a rallying cry to fight for democracy, Hayes-Bautista said. The first Cinco de Mayo commemorations were held in Los Angeles and San Francisco in 1863 with parades, speakers and music.

A year after, in 1863, 45 Mexican American women organized to provide aid to those affected by the continuing French-Mexican War going on at the time. They called their group the Junta Patriótica de las Señoras de Sonora (a town founded by miners from Sonora, Mexico), specifically, in the 1850s. Columbia was its next door neighbor, and there were many Mexican miners living there, too. ), which translates to Ladies' Patriotic Assembly of Sonora, and they would hold Cinco de Mayo celebrations each year for a time to commemorate the Mexican Army's victory over occupying French forces at the first Battle of Puebla on May 5, 1862.

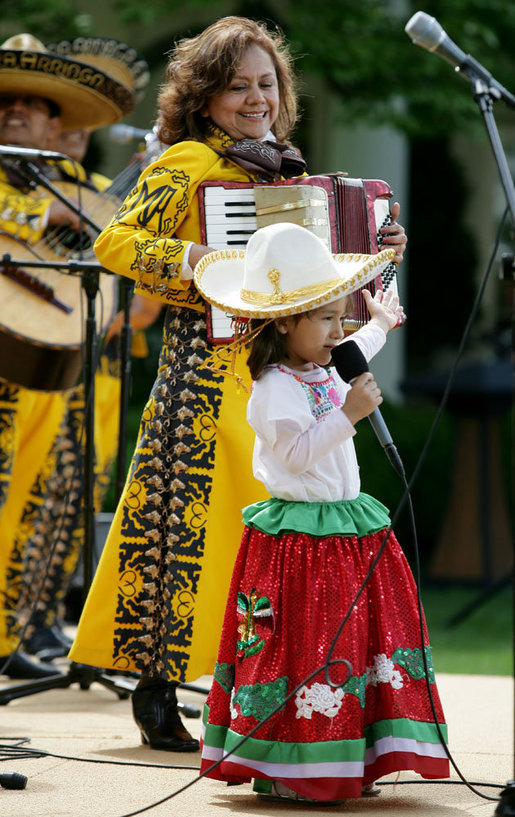
Cinco de Mayo performers at the White House

According to "Cinco de Mayo's First Seventy-Five Years in Alta California: From Spontaneous Behavior to Sedimented Memory, 1862 to 1937." by David E. Hayes-Bautista and Cynthia L. Chamberlin, published in the Southern California Quarterly, by the UCLA Center for the Study of Latino Health and Culture about the origin of the observance of Cinco de Mayo in the United States, the modern American focus on that day first started in California in 1863 in response to the resistance to French rule in Mexico. "Far up in the gold country town of Columbia (now Columbia State Park) Mexican miners were so overjoyed at the news that they spontaneously fired off rifle shots and fireworks, sang patriotic songs and made impromptu speeches."

A 2007 UCLA Newsroom article notes that "the holiday, which has been celebrated in California continuously since 1863, is virtually ignored in Mexico." Time magazine reports that "Cinco de Mayo started to come into vogue in 1940s America during the rise of the Chicano Movement." The holiday crossed over from California into the rest of the United States in the 1950s and 1960s but did not gain popularity until the 1980s when marketers, especially beer companies, capitalized on the celebratory nature of the day and began to promote it. It grew in popularity and evolved into a celebration of Mexican culture and heritage, first in areas with large Mexican-American populations, like Los Angeles, Chicago, Houston, New York, New Orleans, followed by Cleveland, Boston, Indianapolis, Raleigh, Dallas, San Antonio, Washington, D.C., Atlanta, Miami, Orlando, Denver, Phoenix, Philadelphia, Tucson, San Francisco, San Jose, and San Diego.Many events involve food truck stands to eat at or drinks with tequila, as well as a musician festival to celebrate Mexican culture.

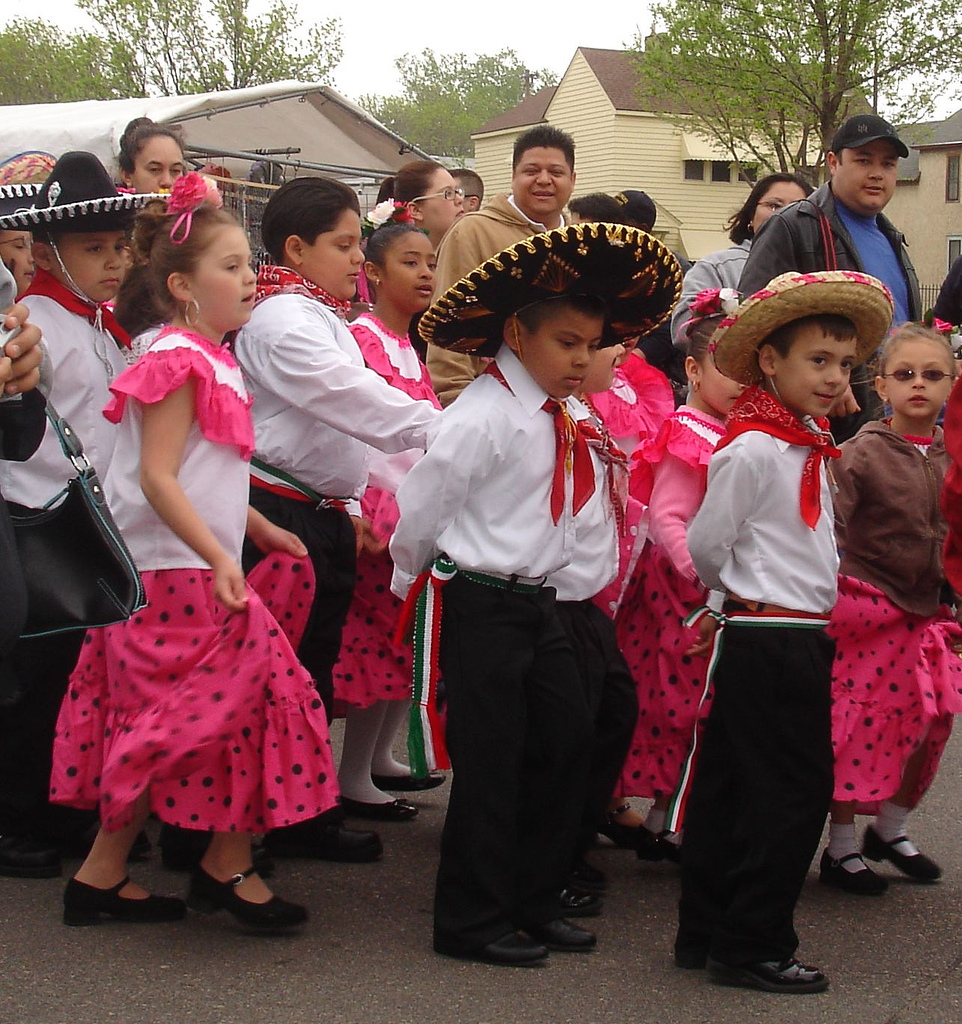
Cinco de Mayo celebration in Saint Paul, Minnesota

In a 1998 study in the Journal of American Culture it was reported that there were more than 120 official US celebrations of Cinco de Mayo in 21 different states. An update in 2006 found that the number of official Cinco de Mayo events was 150 or more, according to José Alamillo, a professor of ethnic studies at Washington State University in Pullman, who has studied the cultural impact of Cinco de Mayo north of the border. Los Angeles' Fiesta Broadway has been billed as the largest Cinco de Mayo celebration in the world, which it most certainly was at its peak in the 1990s when it attracted crowds of 500,000 or more. In recent years attendance has seen a dramatic decrease.

On June 7, 2005, the United States Congress issued a concurrent resolution calling on the President of the United States (George W. Bush) to issue a proclamation calling upon the people of the United States to observe Cinco de Mayo with appropriate ceremonies and activities. To celebrate, many display Cinco de Mayo banners while school districts hold special events to educate students about its historical significance. Special events and celebrations highlight Mexican culture, especially in its music and regional dancing. Examples include baile folklórico and mariachi demonstrations held annually at the Plaza del Pueblo de Los Ángeles, near Olvera Street. Commercial interests in the United States have capitalized on the celebration, advertising Mexican products and services, with an emphasis on alcoholic beverages, foods, and music. According to Nielsen, in 2013 more than $600 million worth of beer was purchased in the United States for Cinco de Mayo, more than for the Super Bowl or St. Patrick's Day.

The May 4, 2023 edition of The Washington Post published an article describing the holiday of Cinco de Mayo as an American holiday with Mexican roots and not necessarily a Mexican holiday.

On May 5, 2026, Cinco De Mayo occurred on a Tuesday, which caused many restaurants to advertise the fact that Cinco De Mayo took place on Taco Tuesday.

== History of the holiday elsewhere ==
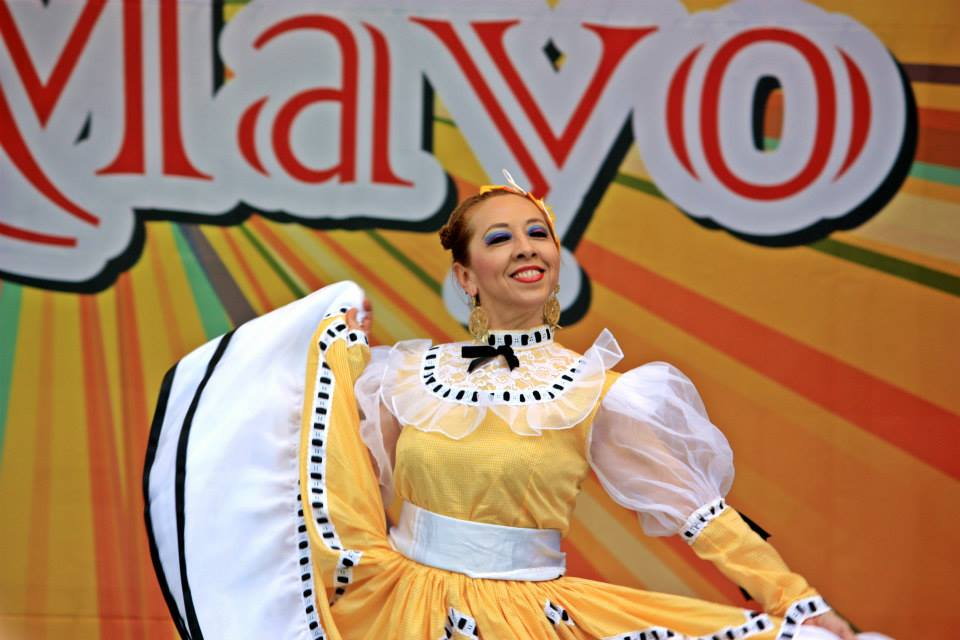
Cinco de Mayo celebration in Japan, 2019

Events tied to Cinco de Mayo also occur outside Mexico and the United States. As in the United States, celebrations elsewhere also emphasize Mexican cuisine, culture and music. For example, some Canadian pubs play Mexican music and serve Mexican food and drink, and a sky-diving club near Vancouver holds a Cinco de Mayo skydiving event. In the Cayman Islands, in the Caribbean, there is an annual Cinco de Mayo air guitar competition, and at Montego Bay, Jamaica, there is a Cinco de Mayo celebration. The city of Brisbane, Queensland, Australia, holds an annual Mexican Festival to honor the day, and celebrations are held in London and New Zealand. Other celebrations of the day can also be found in Cape Town, South Africa, Lagos, Nigeria, and in Paris, France. Cinco de Mayo is celebrated in Japan in Osaka and in Tokyo's Yoyogi Park Event Space as a celebration of Latin American culture.

== See also ==
- List of occasions known by their dates
- Siege of Puebla (1863), fall of Puebla to the French
- Third Battle of Puebla (1867), recapture of Puebla and decisive victory for the restoration of the Republic
