= The Justice (newspaper) =

Brandeis University student newspaper

- Type: Weekly newspaper
- Staff writers: 50
- Founded: 1949
- Headquarters: Waltham, Massachusetts, U.S.
- Circulation: 1250
- Website: www.thejustice.org
- Free online archives: issuu.com/justice

The Justice is the independent student newspaper of Brandeis University in Waltham, Massachusetts. The paper is run primarily by undergraduate students. Since its founding in 1949, The Justice has provided a critical perspective on Brandeis University policy and events through its articles and editorial work. The Justice is published every Tuesday, and is distributed throughout the Brandeis campus.

== History ==
=== Founding ===
Brandeis was established in 1948, and members of the founding class of 107 first-year students created The Justice the following spring. The newspaper was named after the university's namesake, Justice Louis Brandeis. In its first issue, published in March 1949, Carl Werner, class of 1952, outlined the responsibilities that the first graduating class had on its shoulders, "Brandeis University is depending on its teachers, but even more so it is depending on its students. If you fail, you are hurting the chances of its survival."

=== 20th century ===
In the 1950–51 school year, as the nascent school underwent large-scale construction, The Justice documented the progress of construction crews, which, according to the Brandeis Internet and Technology Service's history of the university, appeared to be unusually slow. "Even the new facilities sometimes worked to challenge their resolve. In the new Ridgewood Quad broken pipes led to extended periods without heat, compounded by the swamp of ankle-deep mud between the dorms and the center of campus, dubbed by residents the 'Ridgewood Quagmire'". The Justice was an outlet for students to voice their concerns about the school's growing pains.

As the school expanded, Brandeis president Abram L. Sachar announced plans to build a Jewish chapel in the 1952–53 school year. Earlier plans for a multi-faith chapel had been abandoned, as the administration assumed that Catholic authorities would not approve of holding services in it. The Justice's editorial board, along with the student council and a group of concerned students, requested an alternative that would maintain Brandeis's Jewish identity while including students from other faiths. As a result of these efforts, Sachar agreed to construct a three-chapel complex that would separate Jewish, Protestant and Catholic services.

In the spring of 1967, President Lyndon B. Johnson announced plans to suspend draft deferrals for students pursuing higher education, bringing increased student attention to the Vietnam war. The Justice published articles that served to bring the alternatives to military service to light, and interviewed an imprisoned draft resister.

During the 1977–78 school year, The Justice reported that Brandeis held stock in 15 companies with commercial ties to apartheid. As a result, students began pressuring the administration to divest from South Africa. Skeptical that divestment would effect any change, then-president Marver Hillel Bernstein brought the issue to the school's board of trustees, who decided to use Brandeis's position as a stockholder to push for improvements. The New Hampshire Union Leader responded to students' protests in an editorial, writing, "if Brandeis students had their way and succeeded in hurting South African business, Israeli business would suffer". The Justice responded that the protests were about the immorality of apartheid—not the Israeli companies that relied on South African companies' supply of diamonds—and questioned why the Union Leader had singled out the student movement at Brandeis instead of similar ones at Dartmouth College, Harvard University, or Wellesley College.

In 1993, The Justice ran an advertisement placed by the Committee for Open Debate on the Holocaust that questioned whether The Holocaust occurred. Its publication led to student protests, and thousands of copies of The Justice were stolen. According to coverage in The New York Times, the editors of The Justice accepted the ad "so readers would know that such thinking existed". In response to student protest and widespread criticism of the decision to run the ad, the editor in chief of The Justice, David Turner, announced that the $130 earned from the advertisement would be donated to the Holocaust museum. The editorial board of The Boston Globe subsequently rebuked The Justice for its editorial judgement and handling of the controversy, calling it "pathetic" that college journalists "would allow themselves to be manipulated by Holocaust revisionists".

=== Digital era ===
The Justice began releasing content on its website in 2001. In 2003, publication of the newspaper was delayed after an issue contained a racist remark. The sports writer who wrote the piece containing the remark, four members of the editorial board, and the editor in chief subsequently resigned, and The Justice published an editorial claiming that the editors resigned under duress.

In a report published in October 2013, The Justice detailed how cuts to the school's Ph.D. programs had resulted in a decrease in the number of enrolled students and teaching fellows. The article's author, news editor Marissa Ditkowsky, subsequently received the 2014 award for Excellence in Student Coverage of Higher Education from the American Association of University Professors (AAUP). Ditkowsky told the AAUP, "This trend is one that is occurring not only at Brandeis but also nationally. Cutting doctoral students is affecting universities that are interested in maintaining funds for other purposes and are concerned more about the business model than the educational process."

Brandeis announced in the spring of 2014 that feminist and activist Ayaan Hirsi Ali would be one of five honorary degree recipients at its commencement ceremony in May. The Justice covered the resulting outcry, as students and faculty argued that some of Hirsi Ali's past statements harshly criticizing Islam constituted Islamophobia and hate speech. Brandeis president Frederick M. Lawrence quickly rescinded Hirsi Ali's degree. Media outlets, such as Al Jazeera America and The New York Times, cited The Justice's coverage of the community's backlash. Reuters mentioned The Justice's editorial, calling on Brandeis to retract Hirsi Ali's invitation and quoted managing editor Glen Chesir, who explained, "She has the right to her opinion ... (but) an honorary degree is an endorsement."

In April 2015, The Justice covered Take Back the Night, a public event on campus dedicated to raising awareness of sexual violence. A number of students and administrators criticized the newspaper for anonymously quoting sexual assault survivors and demanded that it alter or remove the article. The Student Press Law Center reported that in August 2015, three editors were notified by a law office "hired by the university to investigate the case for a potential lawsuit" that the event's "safe space mentality" made Take Back the Night a private event, and consequently illegal for The Justice's reporter to have recorded without explicit permission from participants. The following February, the university informed The Justice that a student had filed a complaint alleging that its coverage of Take Back the Night violated the school's Electronic Device and Privacy policy. In March, the Foundation for Individual Rights in Education demanded that the university dismiss all charges, writing that "threatening student journalists with discipline for accurately reporting on a public event is a severe violation of the freedom of expression that Brandeis promises to its students and claims to cherish." Brandeis dropped the charges less than a week later and subsequently clarified its policy, explicitly permitting student journalists to record public events.

As of 2018, The Justice was releasing a 20-page print paper every Tuesday for distribution throughout the Brandeis University campus, as well as PDF versions of printed media on its website. The editorial board consists of all editors in the masthead, except for the news editors, and meets twice per week to discuss the editorial(s) for each issue. The masthead and contact information for all the editors are also published on The Justice's website, as are the newspaper's constitution and code of ethics.

The Brandeis University Library has kept archives of The Justice since the newspaper's creation in 1949. They are available for public viewing on the website as PDFs.

== Notable alumni ==
Notable alumni of The Justice include:

- Mark A. Altman, writer, producer and actor
- Stanley Brooks, film and television producer, most notably producing Broken Trail and Prayers for Bobby
- Dan Hirschhorn
- Jon Landau, music critic, manager and record producer, as well as the head of the nominating committee for the Rock and Roll Hall of Fame
- Guy Raz, journalist and podcaster, former host of TED Radio Hour
- Jesse Singal
