= Philadelphia Bulletin =

Evening newspaper, published 1847–1982

The Philadelphia Bulletin
- "In Philadelphia, nearly everybody reads The Bulletin"
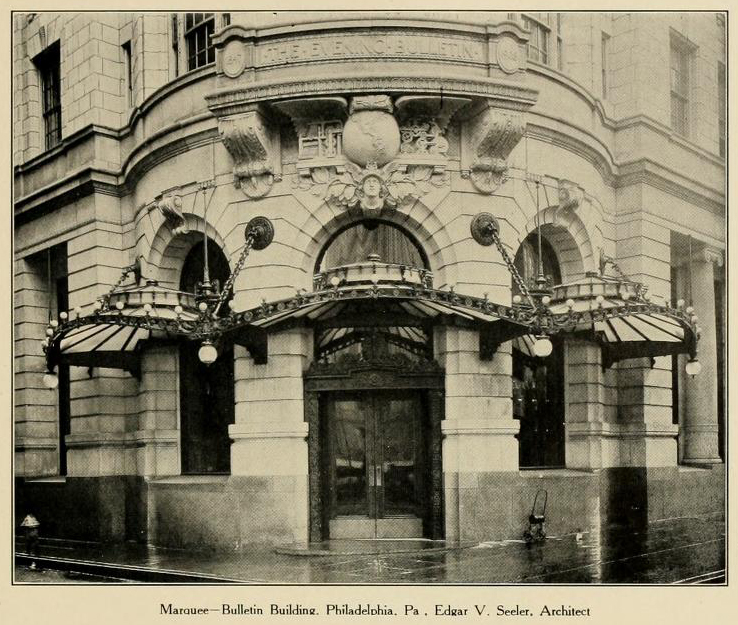
- The Philadelphia Bulletin Building at 1315-1325 Filbert Street in Center City Philadelphia in 1909
- Type: Daily newspaper
- Owner: Charter Company
- Founder: Alexander Cummings
- Former name: Cummings’ Evening Telegraphic Bulletin
- Founded: April 17, 1847; 179 years ago
- Ceased publication: January 29, 1982; 44 years ago
- Relaunched: 2004
- Headquarters: 1315-1325 Filbert Street, Philadelphia, Pennsylvania, U.S.
- Circulation: 761,000 (as of 1947)
- Website: thephiladelphiabulletin.com

The Philadelphia Bulletin (or The Bulletin as it was commonly known) was a daily evening newspaper published from 1847 to 1982 in Philadelphia, Pennsylvania. It was the largest circulation newspaper in Philadelphia for 76 years and was once the largest evening newspaper in the United States. Its widely known slogan was: "In Philadelphia, nearly everybody reads The Bulletin."

Describing the Bulletin's style, publisher William L. McLean once said: "I think the Bulletin operates on a principle which in the long run is unbeatable. This is that it enters the reader's home as a guest. Therefore, it should behave as a guest, telling the news rather than shouting it." As Time magazine later noted: "In its news columns, the Bulletin was solid if unspectacular. Local affairs were covered extensively, but politely. Muckraking was frowned upon."

== History ==
=== 1847 to 1895 ===
The Bulletin was first published by Alexander Cummings on April 17, 1847, as Cummings’ Evening Telegraphic Bulletin.

When Cummings sold the business in 1860, James S. Chambers succeeded him as publisher. His inaugural edition published the first telegraph report in a U.S. newspaper, a dispatch from the Mexican War.

Cummings lost control of the Bulletin to stockholders in the 1850s. From 1859 until 1895, the paper was edited by Gibson Peacock. The Bulletin was last in circulation of Philadelphia's 13 daily newspapers for the remainder of the 19th century.

=== 1895 to 1975 ===
When Peacock died in 1895, the newspaper was purchased by businessman William L. McLean. At the time, the last-place Bulletin sold for 2 cents an issue, equal to $0.77 today. McLean cut the price in half and increased coverage of local news. By 1905, the paper was the city's largest.

In 1912, the Bulletin was one of a cooperative of four newspapers, including the Chicago Daily News, The Boston Globe, and The New York Globe, that formed the Associated Newspapers syndicate.

McLean's son Robert took over in 1931. Later in the 1930s, the paper bought WPEN, one of Philadelphia's early radio stations. In 1946, it acquired a construction permit for Philadelphia's third television station.

In 1947 the Bulletin bought out a morning competitor, The Philadelphia Record, and incorporated features of the Record's Sunday edition into the new Sunday Bulletin. By 1947 the Bulletin was the nation's biggest evening daily, with 761,000 readers. Along with the Record, it also acquired the rights to buy Philadelphia's third-oldest radio station, WCAU. In a complex deal, the Bulletin sold off WPEN and WCAU's FM sister, changed WPEN-FM's call letters to WCAU-FM, and the calls for its under-construction television station to WCAU-TV. The WCAU stations were sold to CBS in 1957.

The Bulletin's understated brand of journalism won Pulitzer Prizes in 1964 and 1965. James V. Magee, Albert V. Gaudiosi and Frederick Meyer won the 1964 Pulitzer Prize for Local Investigative Specialized Reporting for their expose of numbers racket operations with police collusion in South Philadelphia, which resulted in arrests and a cleanup of the police department. J.A. Livingston won the 1965 Pulitzer Prize for International Reporting for his reports on the growth of economic independence among Russia's Eastern European satellites and his analysis of their desire for a resumption of trade with the West.

=== Decline in circulation ===
As readers and advertisers moved from the city to the suburbs, the Bulletin attempted to follow. It introduced regional editions for four suburban counties and leased a plant in southern New Jersey to print a state edition. Reporters attended school and county meetings, but their efforts could not match the combined resources of the smaller suburban dailies.

The Bulletin also faced a difficulty that plagued all big-city evening newspapers: late afternoon traffic made distribution more costly than for morning papers. The Bulletin faced even greater competition from television evening newscasts.

The Bulletin's biggest problem, however, may have been the morning Philadelphia Inquirer. The Inquirer was on the verge of extinction until Eugene L. Roberts Jr. became executive editor in 1972 and William Boyd Dickinson retired as executive editor of The Bulletin in 1973. Under Roberts, The Inquirer won six consecutive Pulitzer Prizes and gained national reputation for quality journalism. The Inquirer grabbed the circulation lead in 1980. By 1982, The Inquirer was receiving 60 percent of the city’s newspaper advertising revenue, compared to The Bulletin's 24-percent share. The Bulletin launched a morning edition in 1978, but by then the momentum had shifted decisively.

=== Final months ===
In 1980, the Bulletin was acquired by the Charter Company of Jacksonville, Florida, a conglomerate which would spend most of the 1980s in various financial troubles. In December 1981, Charter put it up for sale. The Bulletin continued publishing while speaking with prospective buyers. City residents organized a “Save Our Bulletin” campaign. On January 18, 1982, 300 loyal supporters sporting S.O.B. buttons held a candlelight vigil in front of the paper's offices in subfreezing weather. Philadelphia Mayor William Green offered tax breaks and low-interest loans to help finance a purchase.

With no prospective buyers, Charter attempted to give the newspaper away. No publisher, however, would assume the paper's $29.5 million in promissory notes and $12 million in severance costs to the paper's 1,943 employees. Four groups of buyers did come forward, but each found the newspaper's prospects too discouraging.

After losing $21.5 million in 1981, The Bulletin was dropping nearly $3 million per month when it published its final edition on January 29, 1982. Said Charter Company President J.P. Smith Jr.: "In the final analysis, the paper was unable to generate the circulation and additional advertising revenues ... it needed to survive."

The headline of the final edition read "Goodbye: After 134 years, a Philadelphia voice is silent" and the paper’s slogan was changed to "Nearly Everybody Read The Bulletin" (emphasis added). A front-page message to readers appeared "below the fold" in which publisher N.S. (“Buddy”) Hayden stated: "It’s over. And there’s very little left to say, except goodbye."

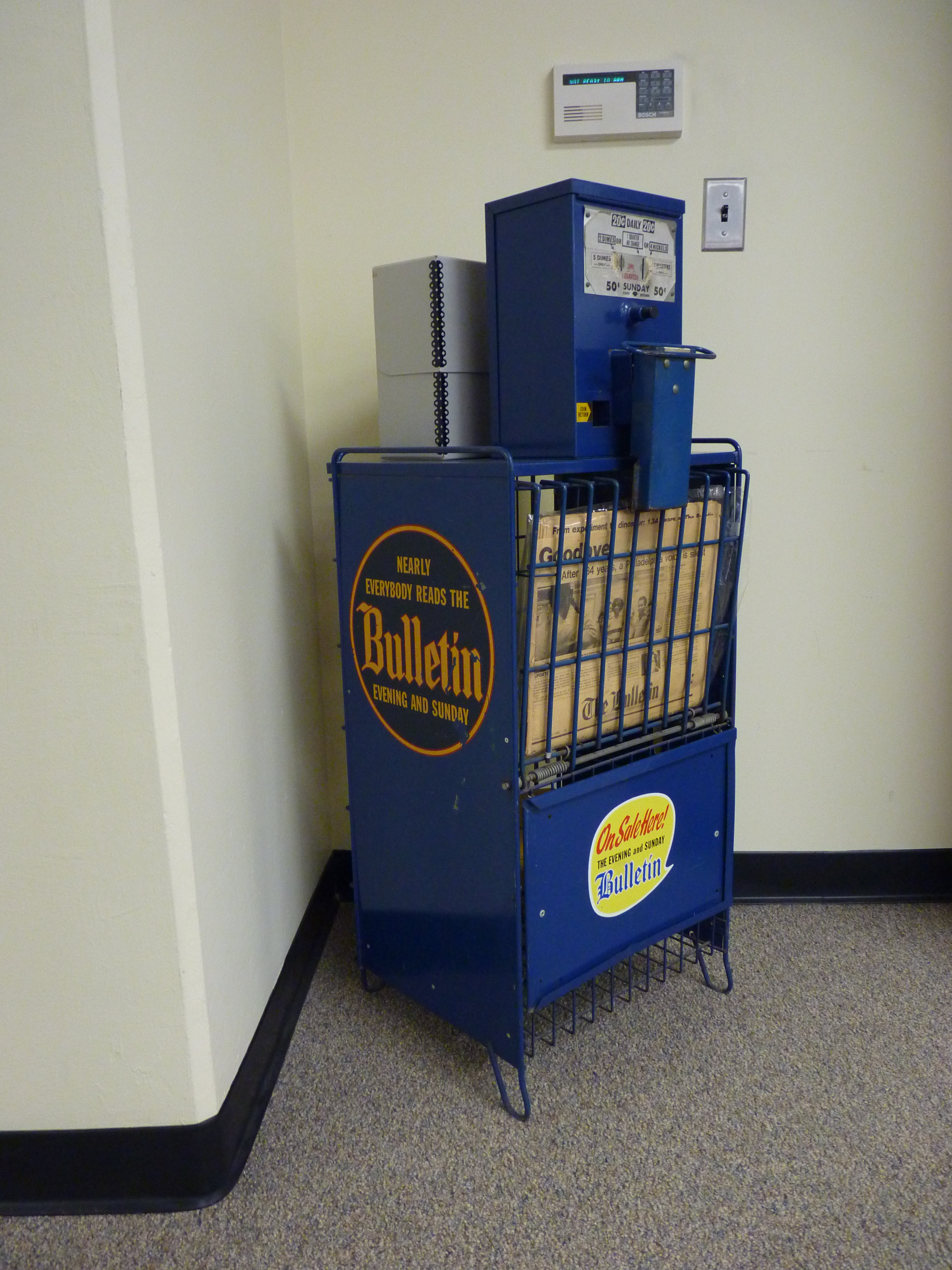
Philadelphia Evening Bulletin newspaper vending machine, with last issue, from Temple University archives

The Bulletin's internal newsclipping files (approximately 500,000 pieces), card indexes, and photographs (ca. 3 million) are now held in the Temple University Libraries. Thousands of Bulletin photographs have been scanned and have been made available by the Temple Libraries for online study. A limited sampling of clippings are also available online.

The Free Library of Philadelphia holds copies of the paper on microfilm.

== Relaunch: The Bulletin ==
In 2004 Philadelphia investment banker Thomas G. Rice bought the Bulletin naming rights from the McLean family. Rice's new newspaper, which began circulating on November 22, 2004, was known as The Bulletin.

On June 1, 2009, the paper suspended print publication, but continued publishing stories on its website. By early 2011, the website was offline as well.

== See also ==
- Bill Conlin
- Rowland Evans
- Dan Hirschhorn
- William P. McGivern
- Albert J. Neri
- Marjorie Paxson
- Ray Didinger
- Reginald E. Beauchamp
