= James S. Chambers (publisher) =

American journalist (1821–1904)

James S. Chambers (1821—1904) was a 19th-century American co-owner, editor, and publisher of the Philadelphia Bulletin as well as Navy agent for the Port of Philadelphia on behalf of the U.S. Government, appointed by President Abraham Lincoln; he is the namesake of the USS James S. Chambers.

== Background ==
James Slater Chambers was born on July 14, 1821, in Philadelphia. His parents were Peter Chambers and Jane Harwood.

== Career ==
=== Philadelphia Bulletin ===
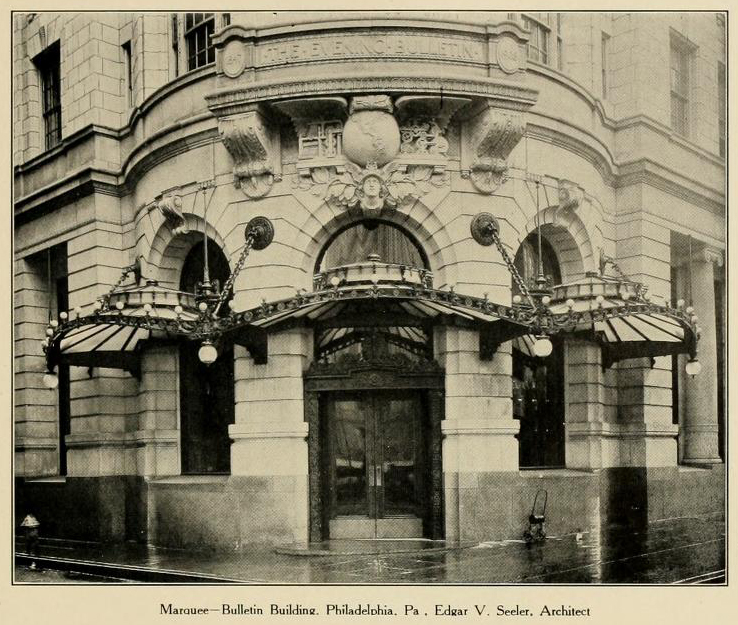
Philadelphia Bulletin Building, where Chambers was publisher and co-owner

Before 1860, Chambers was a co-owner and editor of the Philadelphia Bulletin (also known as the Evening Bulletin and Philadelphia Evening Bulletin). By March 1860, when partner Alexander Cummings sold out and, with increased ownership, the co-owners voted Chambers publisher.

One of his trainees was Richard Harding Davis (1864–1916), who later covered the Spanish–American War, the Second Boer War, and the First World War.

Chambers remained publisher at least as late as 1878 (also listed as publisher of the Philadelphia Day).

=== Navy agent ===
On August 10, 1861, Chambers was appointed Navy agent for the Port of Philadelphia by U.S. President Abraham Lincoln.

On December 26, 1864, on order of U.S. President Abraham Lincoln, U.S. Secretary of the Navy Gideon Welles sent Chambers a letter of removal:

NAVY DEPARTMENT, December 26, 1864
SIR: By direction of the President of the United States you are hereby removed from the office of the Navy agent at Philadelphia, and you will immediately transfer to Paymaster A.E. Watson, United States Navy, all the public funds and other property in your charge.
Very respectfully, GIDEON WELLES
Secretary of the Navy

The letter formed part of Johnson's defense against impeachment proceedings.

=== USS James S. Chambers ===
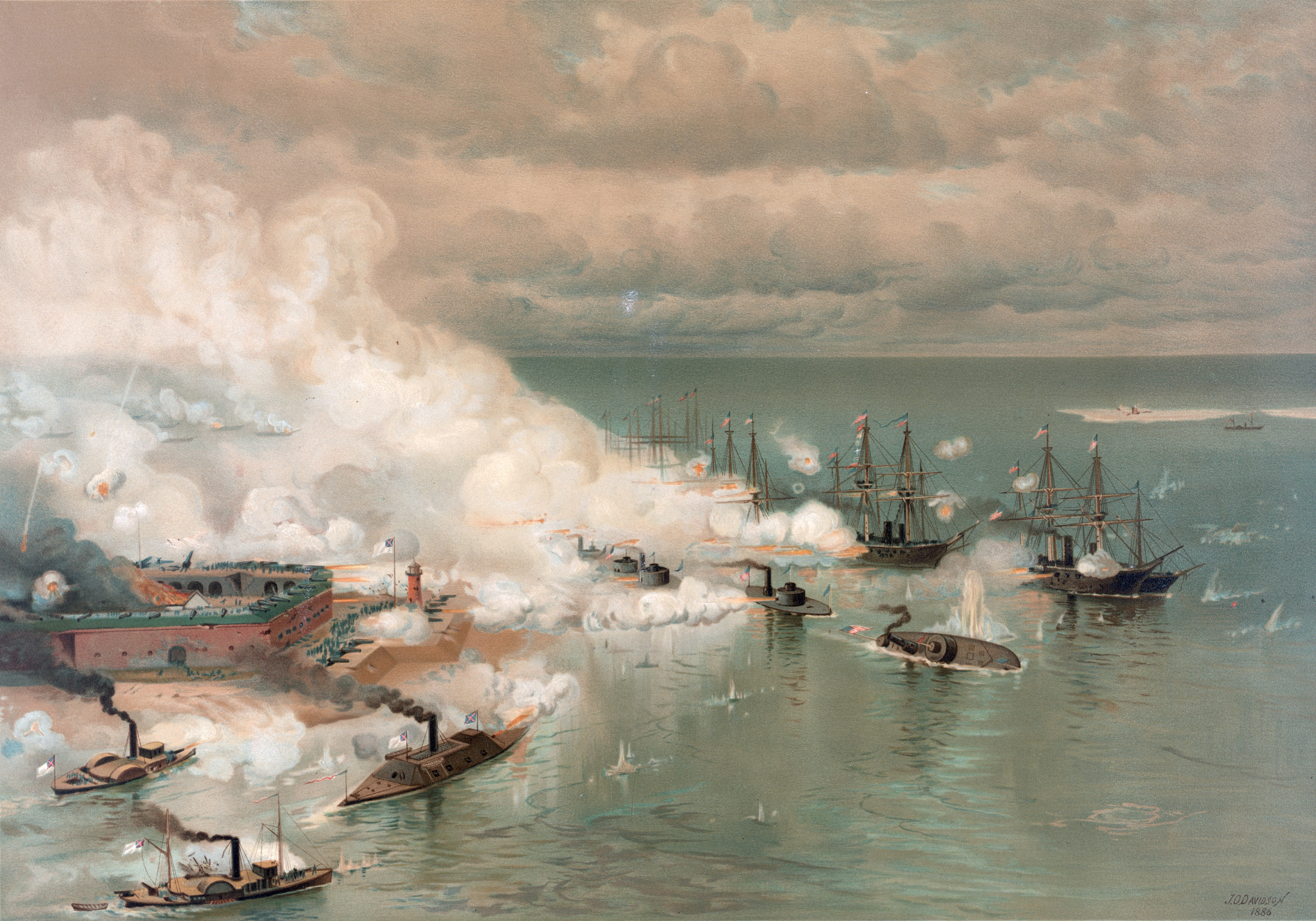
"Battle of Mobile Bay" by Louis Prang depicts an engagement similar to those in which the USS James S. Chambers partook

Also in 1861, the Union Navy named the USS James S. Chambers, a three-masted schooner it acquired on September 4, 1861, during the American Civil War (less than three weeks after Chambers' appointment as Navy agent). She served as gunboat to block Confederate waterways.

== Personal and death ==
On December 17, 1861, Chambers married the daughter of James R. Gaskins, Esq.

The editor James S. Slater (1853–1923) was his nephew.

Chambers was an unabashed supporter of Lincoln, not only due to his own position as Navy agent but also because his aged father had been made superintendent of warehouses for the Philadelphia customs service.
