= The Bulletin (Philadelphia newspaper) =

- Type: Weekly newspaper
- Format: Broadsheet
- Owner(s): The Bulletin, Inc.
- Publisher: Thomas G. Rice
- Editor: John Secor
- Founded: November 22, 2004
- Ceased publication: June 1, 2009
- Language: English
- Headquarters: Philadelphia, Pennsylvania, U.S.
- Circulation: 100,000 (claimed)
- Website: thebulletin.us (Archived)

The Bulletin (2004–2009) was a newspaper that served the Philadelphia metropolitan area of the United States. It was founded in 2004 as a modern iteration of the Philadelphia Bulletin (1847–1982).

Philadelphia investment banker Thomas G. Rice bought naming rights to The Bulletin from the McLean family; The Philadelphia Bulletin, which had ceased publication in 1982. Rice's new newspaper began circulating on November 22, 2004 with an initial circulation run of 25,000. The Bulletin billed itself as "Philadelphia's Family Newspaper" and had a conservative editorial focus. The Bulletin circulated to approximately 10,000 households in Center City, Philadelphia, as well as upwards of 86,000 households in Bucks, Chester, eastern Montgomery, Delaware County, and the Main Line. In June 2009, the paper suspended publication for financial reasons, and last published on June 1, 2009.

In "A Special Message From The Publisher" the publisher announced that The Bulletin would resume publishing as a Sunday expanded print edition, and as an online service updated daily, as of August 2, 2009.
