= List of Brandeis University people =

Here follows a list of notable alumni and faculty of Brandeis University.

== Notable alumni ==
=== Academia ===
- Eve Adler, Classicist, professor at Middlebury College
- Amnon Albeck, Chemist, professor and University's Vice-Rector at Bar-Ilan University
- Frederick Alt, Geneticist at Harvard Medical School and Howard Hughes Medical Institute investigator.
- Arjun Appadurai, Anthropologist and editor of Public Culture
- Elliot Aronson, Social psychologist known for research on the theory of cognitive dissonance
- Seyla Benhabib, Professor of political science and philosophy at Yale University
- Bonnie Berger, Professor of applied mathematics, Massachusetts Institute of Technology
- Steven L. Berk, Professor of medicine at Texas Tech University Health Sciences Center
- Ilan Berman, Vice President of the American Foreign Policy Council
- David Bernstein, Law professor and blogger
- Ruth Ben-Ghiat, History professor, New York University
- Deborah Bial, Education strategist, Founder and President of Posse Foundation, MacArthur Fellow
- Richard Burgin, Professor, fiction writer, critic, founder and editor of Boulevard literary magazine
- Alexandra Chasin, Writer, Mellon Chair in Humanities with The Bard Prison Initiative
- Nancy Chodorow, Feminist sociologist and psychoanalyst
- Arthur L.Caplan, Professor of Bioethics
- Angela Davis, Political activist, academic and author
- Donna Robinson Divine, Professor at Smith College
- Jean Bethke Elshtain, Professor at the University of Chicago Divinity School, feminist, political philosopher
- Daniel A. Foss, Sociologist
- Perry A. Frey, Professor of biochemistry at University of Wisconsin–Madison
- Robert Gallucci, President of the MacArthur Foundation
- Sherwood Gorbach, Emeritus Professor at Tufts University School of Medicine
- Herbert Gross, Professor of Mathematics, Bunker Hill Community College, Corning Community College, Massachusetts Institute of Technology
- Evelyn Fox Keller, Historian and philosopher of science, MacArthur Fellow 1992
- David Kertzer, Anthropologist at Brown University; Pulitzer Prize-winning author of The Pope and Mussolini
- Barak Kushner, Professor of East Asian History at the University of Cambridge
- Yanna Krupnikov, Political scientist
- Deborah Lipstadt, History professor, Emory University
- George Loewenstein, Professor of Economics and Psychology at Carnegie Mellon University
- Roderick MacKinnon, Professor at Rockefeller University, Nobel Prize in Chemistry
- Fatema Mernissi, Moroccan sociologist
- Joseph S. Murphy, President of Queens College, president of Bennington College, and Chancellor of the City University of New York
- Elisa New, Professor, Harvard University, wife of Lawrence Summers, former President of Harvard University
- David Oshinsky, Pulitzer Prize-winning historian, professor
- Alicia Ostriker, Poet, professor at Rutgers University
- John A. Pojman, Professor and Chair of the Department of Chemistry at Louisiana State University.
- Lawrence Rosen, Anthropologist and law professor
- Philip Rubin, Cognitive scientist, CEO Emeritus, Haskins Laboratories
- Paul Sally, Professor of mathematics, University of Chicago
- Michael Sandel, Professor of political philosophy, Harvard University and former member of The President's Council on Bioethics
- Lawrence Schiffman, Historian of ancient Judaism and Vice-Provost at Yeshiva University
- Joan Wallach Scott, Historian of France and pioneer in the field of gender history
- Milette Shamir, Israeli scholar of American literature and vice president of Tel Aviv University
- Judith Shapiro, Former president, Barnard College
- Elaine Showalter, Literary critic
- Lawrence Solan, Professor of law at Brooklyn Law School
- Hortense Spillers, Literary critic, Black feminist scholar and professor at Vanderbilt University
- Maurice R. Stein, Founding dean of the School of Critical Studies at the California Institute of the Arts, and a professor of sociology at Brandeis University
- Alan Taylor, Pulitzer-Prize-winning historian, professor at UC Davis
- Fernando Torres-Gil, Associate Dean and professor of public policy, UCLA School of Public Affairs
- Paul Townsend, Physicist, notable for work on String Theory
- Karen Uhlenbeck, Mathematics professor, MacArthur Fellow, awarded Leroy P. Steele Prize for research, first woman to win the Abel Prize.
- Judith G. Voet, Professor of chemistry and biochemistry at Swarthmore College, author of biochemistry textbooks
- Theo Wallimann, Professor, Biochemist/Cell Biologist at ETH Zurich
- Michael Walzer, Professor of social science at the Institute for Advanced Study
- Edward Witten, Physicist, awarded Fields Medal in 1990
- Rich Yampell, Grammarian, Klingon Language Institute
- David B. Yoffie, Professor of International Business Administration at Harvard Business School
- Julian E. Zelizer, Professor of American political history at Princeton University
- Robert J. Zimmer, Former president, University of Chicago

=== Arts and media ===
- Kathy Acker, Novelist
- Mitch Albom, Sports columnist for the Detroit Free Press, author of Tuesdays With Morrie and The Five People You Meet in Heaven
- Paula Apsell, Executive Producer of Nova, the longest-running science documentary series and winner of eight Emmy Awards
- Ross Bauer, composer
- Stanley Bing (aka Gil Schwartz), Author, columnist for Fortune and Esquire; Executive Vice President of CBS Corporation
- Dan Blum, Novelist
- Elizabeth Bruenig, Opinion writer for The Atlantic
- David Brudnoy, Talk radio host in Boston
- Samrat Chakrabarti, British-American actor
- Peter Child, Composer
- Joe Conason, Political columnist for The New York Observer
- David Crane, Co-creator, writer, and executive producer of television series Friends
- Steven Culp, Actor
- Tyne Daly, Actress, co-starred in TV series Cagney & Lacey
- Stuart Damon (Stuart Michael Zonis), Actor, played Dr. Alan Quartermaine for thirty years on the TV soap opera General Hospital
- Loretta Devine, Actress in TV series Boston Public and Grey's Anatomy, and films, including Crash
- Josh Dibb (aka Deakin), Musician, member of Animal Collective
- Alan Ehrenhalt, Senior editor of Governing, contributing writer to The New York Times
- Thomas Friedman, Foreign affairs columnist for The New York Times; winner of the National Book Award and three Pulitzer Prizes
- Lindsay Gardner, Media executive
- Gary David Goldberg, Television writer and producer
- Tony Goldwyn, Actor and director
- Karen Lynn Gorney, Actress
- Alexander Gould, Actor known for roles in Finding Nemo and Weeds
- Debra Granik, Film director and screenwriter
- Mark Halliday, Poet
- Marshall Herskovitz, TV and film producer, director and screenwriter
- Dan Hirschhorn, Political journalist, editor-in-chief at Quartz
- Kay Hymowitz, Conservative commentator, Manhattan Institute scholar
- Chuck Israels, Jazz musician, bassist
- Margo Jefferson, The New York Times theater critic, winner of Pulitzer Prize for Criticism
- Ha Jin, Novelist, winner of the 2000 PEN/Faulkner Award
- Michael Kaiser, Former president, John F. Kennedy Center for the Performing Arts
- Myq Kaplan, Comedian
- Marta Kauffman, Executive Producer and co-creator of the Emmy Award-winning television series Friends
- Jesse Kellerman, Novelist and playwright, son of novelists Jonathan Kellerman and Faye Kellerman
- Arghavan Khosravi, painter, sculptor and illustrator, attended the postbaccalaureate program in 2015.
- Jon Landau, Music critic, manager and record producer
- Susan B. Landau, Film and television producer (Cool Runnings, Mary and Rhoda)
- Louise Lasser, Actress, ex-wife of Woody Allen
- Abby Leigh, Artist
- Mark Leyner, Postmodern novelist
- Peter Lieberson, Composer
- Charlene Liu, Artist
- Steven Mackey, Composer
- Michael McDowell, Novelist and script writer
- Gates McFadden, Actress, best known as Dr. Beverly Crusher on the television series Star Trek: The Next Generation
- Kathleen McInerney, Voice actress, Ash Ketchum seasons 1–8 on Pokémon
- Debra Messing, Actress in television series Will & Grace and The Starter Wife
- Walter Mossberg, Wall Street Journal technology columnist
- Josh Mostel, Actor, son of actor Zero Mostel
- Susana Naidich, Argentine singer
- Barry Newman, Actor
- Marc Tyler Nobleman, Author
- Anand Patwardhan, Documentary filmmaker
- Martin Peretz, Editor-in-chief of The New Republic
- Letty Cottin Pogrebin, Author, journalist, social activist, a founding editor of Ms. magazine
- Patrik-Ian Polk, Writer-producer of Noah's Arc
- Deborah Porter, Critic, non-profit director, founder of the Boston Book Festival
- Tom Rapp, Singer/songwriter, previously of Pearls Before Swine
- Guy Raz, Host of National Public Radio's All Things Considered
- Theresa Rebeck, Playwright and novelist
- Nancy Richler, Novelist
- Nathan J. Robinson, Columnist and founding editor of Current Affairs
- Rosemary Rodriguez, film and TV director including of The Good Wife and Jessica Jones
- Harilyn Rousso, artist, psychotherapist, and disabled rights activist
- Jeff Rubens, Bridge player, writer and editor
- Richard Rubin, Actor, television personality, and reality star of Beauty and the Geek
- David Ian Salter, Film editor of Toy Story 2 and Finding Nemo
- Amelia Schimmel, Public Address Announcer for the Athletics, Bay FC and San Jose Barracuda
- Bill Schneider, CNN's senior political analyst
- Bob Simon, CBS television correspondent for 60 Minutes
- Arunoday Singh, Bollywood actor; grandson of Indian politician Arjun Singh
- Sunny Singh, Writer
- Daniel Smith, Writer
- Laura J. Snyder, Historian, philosopher, and author
- Paul Solman, Journalist for PBS
- Christina Hoff Sommers, Author, resident scholar at the American Enterprise Institute
- Karen Sosnoski, Author and filmmaker
- Michael Sugar, Film and TV producer/Oscar winner for Spotlight
- Gary Tinterow Art historian and curator
- Eric Tuchman Emmy Award-winning showrunner of The Handmaid's Tale
- Jonathan Vankin, Senior Editor, Vertigo Comics
- Robin Weigert, Actress, played Calamity Jane in Deadwood on HBO
- Adam D. Weinberg, Director of Whitney Museum of American Art
- Eliza Wyatt, Playwright, author, and sculptor

=== Business ===
- Leonard Asper, Chief Operating Officer, CanWest
- Mitch Caplan, Former president and CEO, E*Trade Financial Corporation
- Christie Hefner, Former Chairman & CEO, Playboy Enterprises, Inc., daughter of Hugh Hefner
- Brian Hirsch, venture capitalist
- Myra Hiatt Kraft, Philanthropist and late wife of Bob Kraft, owner of New England Patriots NFL football team
- Suk-Won Kim, Chair of SsangYong Business Group, one of the largest companies in the Republic of Korea
- Ólafur Jóhann Ólafsson, Executive Vice President of Time Warner, former CEO and president of Sony Interactive Entertainment, responsible for the introduction of PlayStation
- Bobby Sager, Philanthropist, photographer, former president of Gordon Brothers Group
- Robert F.X. Sillerman, Media entrepreneur; CEO of CKX, Inc. (owner of Elvis Presley Enterprises and American Idol)
- Donald Soffer, Real estate professional and a developer of Aventura, Florida.
- Louise Sunshine, Real estate professional and founder of the Sunshine Group
- Scott A. Travers, Noted numismatist and author.
- Ellis Verdi, Advertising executive and co-founder of the DeVito/Verdi advertising agency

=== Government, law, politics and non-profits ===
- Jack Abramoff, Republican activist; founder, International Freedom Foundation, former lobbyist (convicted of mail fraud, conspiracy to bribe public officials, and tax evasion)
- Donna Arzt, Human rights attorney, law professor
- Françoise Blime-Dutertre, French philosopher
- Sidney Blumenthal, Adviser to President Bill Clinton and journalist
- Naomi Reice Buchwald, United States District Court Judge, Southern District of New York
- Devin Carney, Connecticut State Representative
- Jennifer Casolo, Peace activist
- Bernard Coard, Grenadian politician who led the coup that ousted Maurice Bishop
- Ruth Deech, Baroness Deech, Member of the House of Lords, UK
- Amy Eilberg, First female rabbi ordained in Conservative Judaism, hospice chaplain
- Gustavo Gelpi, United States District Court Judge, District of Puerto Rico
- Geir Haarde, Prime Minister of Iceland
- Wakako Hironaka, Member of the Diet of Japan, State Minister, Director-General of the Environment Agency (1993–94)
- Abbie Hoffman, Social and political activist; co-founder of the Youth International Party ("Yippies")
- Michael E. Horowitz, Inspector General for the United States Department of Justice
- Otis Johnson, Mayor of Savannah, Georgia
- Joette Katz, Associate Justice of the Connecticut Supreme Court
- Lisa Kubiske, United States Ambassador to Honduras
- Robert Lasnik, United States District Court Judge, Western District of Washington
- Osman Faruk Loğoğlu, Ambassador to the United States from the Republic of Turkey
- Roslynn Mauskopf, United States District Court Judge, Eastern District of New York
- Vineeta Rai, Indian Administrative Service officer; former Revenue Secretary, Government of India; voted one of 25 Most Powerful Women in Business in India
- Rakesh Rajani, Tanzanian Civil Society Leader
- Michael Ratner, President of the Center for Constitutional Rights, a non-profit human rights litigation organization
- Lois Galgay Reckitt, executive director, Family Crisis Services of Portland, Maine
- Lauren Rikleen, Author, lawyer, workplace expert
- Edgar Romano, managing senior partner at the New York City law firm Pasternack Tilker Ziegler Walsh Stanton & Romano, LLP
- Stanley Roth, Assistant Secretary of State for East Asian and Pacific Affairs, 1997–2001
- Dimitrij Rupel, Minister of Foreign Affairs of the Republic of Slovenia
- George Saitoti, Vice President of the Republic of Kenya
- Ari Schwartz, Chief operating officer, Center for Democracy and Technology
- Eli J. Segal, Assistant to the President of the United States 1993–1996
- Daniel B. Shapiro, Former United States Ambassador to Israel
- David Sinclair, Maine state representative
- Daniel Sokatch, CEO of the New Israel Fund
- Stephen J. Solarz, Former U.S. Representative from Brooklyn, New York
- Beth Teper, Director of COLAGE (Children of Lesbians and Gays Everywhere)
- Shen Tong, Student leader in the Tiananmen Square protests of 1989
- Andrew H. Warren, State Attorney of Florida's 13th Judicial Circuit, Hillsborough County (1978–01)
- Micah Zenko, Senior Fellow at the Council on Foreign Relations
- Gerald Zerkin, Attorney for Zacarias Moussaoui

=== Science ===
- Larry Abbott, Senior Fellow at Janelia Farms (HHMI); co-director, Columbia Center for Theoretical Neuroscience; member of the National Academy of Sciences
- V. Balakrishnan, Indian theoretical physicist
- Eric R. Braverman, Physician
- Adam Cheyer, AI and CS scientist, co-founder of Siri, the company behind Apple's personal assistant on iOS
- Sharon K. Davis, senior scientist and head of the Social Epidemiology Research Unit at the National Human Genome Research Institute
- Judith Rich Harris, Psychologist
- Arthur G. Hunt, Plant and soils scientist
- Leslie Lamport, Computer scientist and inventor of LaTeX document preparation system
- Beatrice B. "BeBe" Magee, Chemist
- Janet Akyüz Mattei, Astronomer, former director of the American Association of Variable Star Observers
- Siddhartha Roy, Structural biologist, Shanti Swarup Bhatnagar laureate
- Philip Rubin, Cognitive scientist, CEO Emeritus, Haskins Laboratories; White House science advisor in Obama administration
- Lynn L. Silver, Biologist known for her work in antibacterial discovery and development
- Robert H. Singer, Senior Fellow at Janelia Farm Research Campus, Howard Hughes Medical Institute, Chair of Anatomy and Structural Biology at Albert Einstein College of Medicine
- Ron Sun, Professor of Cognitive Sciences and Computer Science, RPI
- Carol Tavris, Social Psychologist
- Drew Weissman, Physician-scientist and Nobel laureate
- Patrick Tufts, Computer scientist and inventor
- Rachel Zimmerman, Space scientist, inventor of the Blissymbol Printer, which simplifies communication for users with physical disabilities

=== Sports ===
- Nelson Figueroa, Major League Baseball pitcher
- Jeffrey Lurie, Owner of Philadelphia Eagles NFL football team
- Tim Morehouse, Fencer, silver medal winner in men's team sabre at the 2008 Summer Olympics
- Sam Shankland, 2018 US Chess Champion

=== Crime, political crimes, and terrorism ===
- Naomi Jaffe, Social and political activist, member of the Weather Underground organization
- Katherine Ann Power, Anti-war activist and former fugitive from justice
- Susan Edith Saxe, Anti-war activist and former fugitive from justice
- Aafia Siddiqui, Neuroscientist (alleged al-Qaeda operative), convicted of assaulting and attempting to kill U.S. soldiers and FBI agents
- Laura Whitehorn, Member of the Weather Underground organization, participated in the Battle of Boston during the Boston busing crisis

== Notable faculty and staff, past and present ==
- John B. Anderson: United States Congressman, third-party candidate for President of the United States in 1980
- Stuart Altman: Healthcare policy economist, member of the Institute of Medicine
- Alexander Altmann: Professor of Jewish Philosophy and History of Ideas
- Teresa Amabile: Social and organizational psychologist
- Robert J. Art: International politics
- Kathleen Barry: Feminist and sociologist
- Leonard Bernstein: Composer and conductor
- Frank Bidart: Poet, awarded Bollingen Prize
- Egon Bittner: Sociologist and police science scholar
- Michael Brenner: Professor for Jewish history and culture
- Bernadette Brooten: Professor of Christian studies, member of the MacArthur Fellows Program
- Olga Broumas: Poet
- David Buchsbaum (emeritus): Member of American Academy of Arts and Sciences
- Mary Baine Campbell: Poet and critic
- Carolyn Cohen: Member of American Academy of Arts and Sciences
- Saul Cohen (emeritus): Member of American Academy of Arts and Sciences
- Frank Conroy: Memoirist, fiction writer, and director of the Iowa Writers' Workshop
- Lewis A. Coser: Sociologist, one of the founders of Dissent magazine
- J.V. Cunningham: Poet and literary critic
- Pamela Dellal: Mezzo-soprano
- Stanley Deser (emeritus): Member of American Academy of Arts and Sciences
- Mark Feeney: Pulitzer Prize-winning arts critic for The Boston Globe
- Irving Fine: Composer
- David Hackett Fischer: Pulitzer Prize-winning historian
- Mickey Fisher: Basketball coach and Brandeis Athletic Director
- Benny Friedman: Pro Football Hall of Fame quarterback; Brandeis Athletic Director and last football coach
- Lawrence "Larry" Fuchs: Founder of the American Studies Department at Brandeis and immigration policy expert
- Paul Georges: Member of National Academy Museum
- Ray Ginger: Historian noted for his biography of Eugene V. Debs
- Eugene Goodheart: Literary critic
- Arthur Green: Jewish spirituality and thought
- Allen Grossman: Poet, awarded Bollingen Prize and MacArthur Fellowship "genius" grant
- Jeff Hall (emeritus): member of American Academy of Arts and Sciences, 2017 Nobel Prize in Physiology or Medicine
- Timothy J Hickey: Computer scientist
- Anita Hill: Lawyer and social policy expert
- Heisuke Hironaka: Mathematician, Fields Medal winner
- Michelle Hoover: Writer-in-residence, author
- Irving Howe: Political theorist, editor and founder of Dissent
- Hugh Huxley (emeritus): Member of the National Academy of Sciences
- Ray Jackendoff (emeritus): Member of American Academy of Arts and Sciences
- Paul Jankowski: Historian
- Gish Jen: Member of American Academy of Arts and Sciences
- William Jencks: Biochemist
- Charles Kadushin, psychologist known for social network analysis and study on Jewish populations
- William E. Kapelle: Medieval historian
- David S. Katz: History of Ideas
- Dorothee Kern: Biochemist, former basketball player for the East Germany national team
- Jytte Klausen: European politics, author of The Cartoons that Shook the World
- Walter Laqueur: Historian and political commentator
- Max Lerner: Author, syndicated columnist, and editor
- Alvin Lucier: Composer of experimental music
- Alasdair MacIntyre: Philosopher
- Kanan Makiya: Iraqi dissident, advocate of the 2003 invasion of Iraq
- Herbert Marcuse: Social theorist and member of the Frankfurt School
- Eve Marder: Neuroscientist
- Abraham Maslow: Psychologist noted for humanistic approach
- Eileen McNamara: Pulitzer Prize- winning columnist for the Boston Globe
- Pauli Murray: Feminist, civil rights advocate, lawyer, and ordained priest
- Ulric Neisser: Pioneer in development of cognitive psychology
- Irene Pepperberg: Psychologist noted for research on cognition in animals, particularly for her work with Alex, a grey parrot
- Gregory Petsko: Biochemist
- James Pustejovsky: Linguist, proposer of Generative Lexicon theory
- Philip Rahv: Literary and social critic, editor and founder of Partisan Review
- David Rakowski: Music, runner-up for the Pulitzer Prize for Music (1999, 2002)
- Robert Reich: United States Secretary of Labor, 1993–1997
- Margret Rey: Author and illustrator of children's books, notably the Curious George series
- Adrienne Rich: Poet, essayist and feminist
- Philip Rieff: Sociologist and cultural critic
- Jehuda Reinharz: Former President of Brandeis University and current Richard Koret Professor of Modern Jewish History, and Director of the Tauber Institute for the Study of European Jewry at Brandeis.
- Eleanor Roosevelt: First Lady of the United States
- Michael Rosbash: Howard Hughes Medical Institute Investigator, 2017 Nobel Prize in Physiology or Medicine
- Rosie Rosenzweig: Resident scholar
- Dennis Ross: Special envoy/ambassador to Middle East under President Bill Clinton
- Jonathan Sarna: Historian of American Judaism
- Nahum Sarna: Biblical scholar, father of Jonathan Sarna
- Morrie Schwartz: Sociologist; subject of Mitch Albom's bestselling novel, Tuesdays with Morrie
- Arnold S. Shapiro: Mathematician
- Thomas M. Shapiro: Sociologist, author
- Mitchell Siporin: Artist
- Thomas Sowell: Economist, senior fellow at the Hoover Institution
- Marie Syrkin: Poet and author
- Andreas Teuber: Philosophy professor, actor
- Samuel O. Thier: President of both Massachusetts General Hospital and Brandeis University
- Gina G. Turrigiano: Neuroscientist, winner of the MacArthur "Genius" Award
- Claude Vigée: Poet
- Kurt Heinrich Wolff: Sociologist
- Franz Wright: Poet, awarded Pulitzer Prize
- Yehudi Wyner: Composer, awarded Pulitzer Prize
- Leslie Zebrowitz: Social psychologist
