= Arzt =

Arzt is a surname of German origin, meaning physician. Notable people with the name include:

- Donna Arzt (1954–2008), American legal scholar
- Eduardo Arzt (born 1953), Argentine molecular biologist

== Fictional ==
- Leslie Arzt, a fictional character on Lost
