= Arthur Hunt =

Arthur Hunt may refer to:

- Arthur Surridge Hunt (1871–1934), English papyrologist
- Arthur Hunt (water polo) (1886–1949), British water polo player
- Arthur G. Hunt, American plant and soils scientist
- Arthur Leigh Hunt, New Zealand businessman and founder in 1953 of New Zealand Antarctic Society
