= Police Executive Research Forum =

Membership organization of executives from large US law enforcement agencies

- Location: Washington D.C., United States
- Website: www.policeforum.org

The Police Executive Research Forum (PERF) is a national membership organization of police executives primarily from the largest city, county and state law enforcement agencies in the United States. The organization is dedicated to improving policing and advancing professionalism through research and involvement in public policy debate. Since its founding in 1976 with support and funding from the Police Foundation, it has fostered debate, research and an openness to challenging traditional police practices. It is headquartered in Washington, D.C.

PERF members must have completed a 4-year college degree program.

Established in 1976, PERF's primary sources of operating revenues are tuition payments for educational programs, grants from private and nonprofit organizations, membership dues, and government contracts.

Since 2014, PERF has focused on developing policies and training programs to minimize police use of lethal force, particularly in situations involving persons with mental illness, developmental disabilities, drug addictions, or other conditions that can cause them to behave erratically or dangerously, and in situations where the subject does not have a firearm. As part of this work, the organization brought U.S. police officials to Scotland for discussions about how the country's largely unarmed police officers handle these potential use of force situations. The resulting training program, Integrating Communications, Assessment, and Tactics (ICAT), has been implemented in more than 150 law enforcement agencies.

PERF also has released a series of reports describing and advocating the increasing role of local law enforcement agencies in addressing the opioid epidemic, by actively helping addicted persons to get treatment and other services, while saving lives by providing naloxone to officers so they can help prevent fatal overdoses.

PERF also has reported on police leaders’ approach to immigration issues and has researched police programs to welcome refugees to American communities. Another area of focus has been reducing gender bias in the police response to sexual assault and domestic violence and expanding the FBI’s definition of rape to more accurately report levels of crime.

Since 2013, PERF also has issued reports on building trust between police and community members; reducing gun violence; advancing Constitutional policing; recommendations on body-worn camera programs; changes in marijuana laws; the role of local police in preventing cybercrime; the police response to active shooter incidents; legitimacy and procedural justice in policing; social media in policing; and civil rights investigations of local police agencies.

In 2007, PERF made news by reporting that violent crime had risen by double-digit percentages in cities across the country between 2005 and 2007. This claim was disputed at the time but the FBI Uniform Crime Reporting Statistics show an increase in violent crime in 2005-2006 amid an otherwise consistent decrease between 1994 and 2009.

PERF organized conference calls with city police chiefs to discuss their response to the Occupy Wall Street movement during the Fall of 2011.

== See also ==
- Commission on Accreditation for Law Enforcement Agencies
- Egon Bittner
- Association of Chief Police Officers
