= Sharon K. Davis =

American social epidemiologist

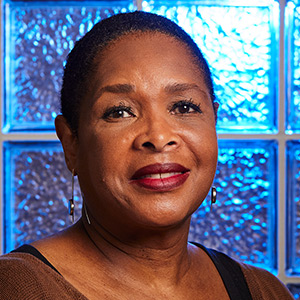
- Education: University of Arkansas (B.A.); Northeastern University (M.Ed.); Harvard Kennedy School (M.P.A.); Brandeis University (Ph.D.)
- Scientific career
- Fields: Human social genomics
- Workplaces: National Human Genome Research Institute
- Doctoral advisor: Stuart Altman

Sharon K. Davis is an American social epidemiologist. She was a senior scientist and head of the Social Epidemiology Research Unit at the National Human Genome Research Institute.

== Education ==
Davis completed a B.A. from University of Arkansas in 1980. She earned a M.Ed. from Northeastern University in 1983. In 1987, she completed a M.P.A. from John F. Kennedy School of Government at Harvard University. She went on to earn a Ph.D. from the Heller School for Social Policy and Management at Brandeis University in 1991.

Davis' dissertation was titled Assessing the effect of Medicare's Prospective Payment System on access to intensive-care treatment among the very-old: A pre/post examination of intensive-care admission patterns.

Stuart Altman was her doctoral advisor.

== Career ==
Davis was a long-time senior scientist in the Metabolic, Cardiovascular and Inflammatory Disease Genomics Branch at the National Human Genome Research Institute (NHGRI). She was the head of the Social Epidemiology Research Unit. As of 2024 she was no longer employed at NIH.

=== Research ===
Davis' research has focused on the effects of social determinants on cardiovascular disease mortality and morbidity among disproportionately affected sub-populations. Her lab is now engaged in an emerging field of human social genomics. This research identifies the types of genes that are subject to social-environmental regulations, the neural and molecular mechanisms that mediate the effects of social processes on gene expression, and the genetic polymorphisms that moderate individual differences in genomic sensitivity to social context.

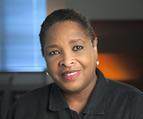
Sharon K. Davis

Davis' lab is also assessing the association of ancestry on sub-clinical cardiovascular risk factors among African-Americans and skin color as a phenotype associated with genetic ancestry and cardiovascular outcomes. The group is measuring differential telomere length correlated to cardiovascular outcomes and social determinants on telomere length among African-Americans.

Davis' team, along with other investigators in the Cardiovascular Section, have implemented a research protocol with the objective of developing a community-based cohort and novel genomic science resource for defining the biological significance of ancestry-related genomic variation in African-Americans related to cardiovascular disease. The study is designed to test the hypothesis that race-ancestry differences in the burden of cardiovascular disease in African-Americans reflects the influence of a unique interplay between the distinct genomic variations characteristic of African-Americans and the "exposome" of social determinants and environmental factors that influence the pathogenesis of cardiovascular disease.

== Personal life ==
Davis was married and had 2 children during the completion of her dissertation in 1991.
