= Ramsey Clark =

66th United States Attorney General (1927–2021)

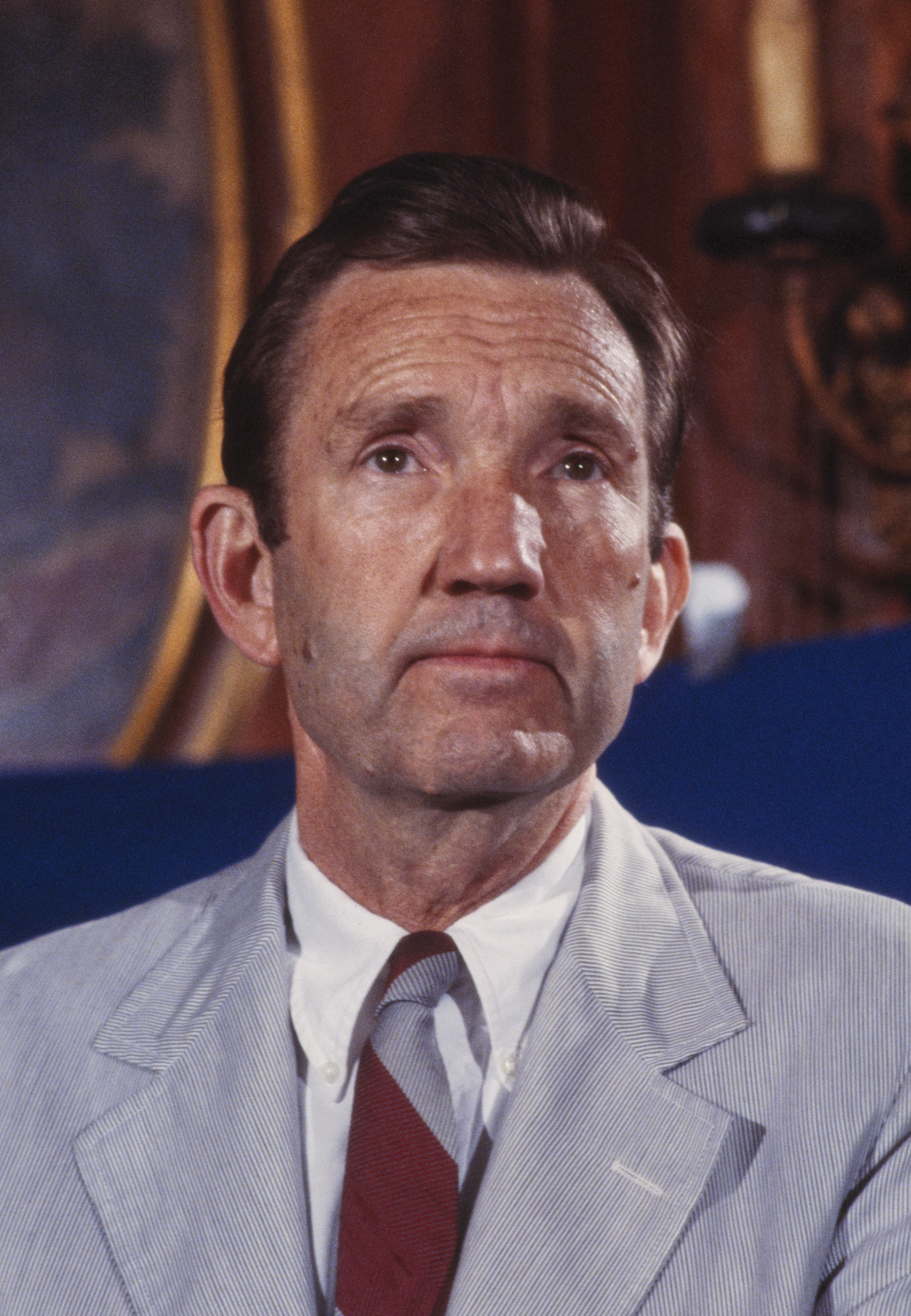
- Clark in 1975

66th United States Attorney General
- In office November 28, 1966 – January 20, 1969 (Note: Acting: November 28, 1966 – March 10, 1967)
- President: Lyndon B. Johnson
- Deputy: Warren Christopher
- Preceded by: Nicholas Katzenbach
- Succeeded by: John N. Mitchell

8th United States Deputy Attorney General
- In office January 28, 1965 – March 10, 1967
- President: Lyndon B. Johnson
- Preceded by: Nicholas Katzenbach
- Succeeded by: Warren Christopher

United States Assistant Attorney General for the Environment and Natural Resources Division
- In office 1961–1965
- President: John F. Kennedy; Lyndon B. Johnson
- Preceded by: Perry W. Morton
- Succeeded by: Edwin L. Weisl Jr.

Personal details
- Born: William Ramsey Clark; December 18, 1927 Dallas, Texas, U.S.
- Died: April 9, 2021 (aged 93) New York City, New York, U.S.
- Party: Democratic
- Spouse: Georgia Welch (m. 1949; died 2010)
- Children: 2
- Relatives: Tom C. Clark (father); William F. Ramsey (grandfather)
- Education: University of Texas at Austin (BA); University of Chicago (MA, JD)

Military service
- Allegiance: United States
- Branch: United States Marine Corps
- Service years: 1945–1946

William Ramsey Clark (December 18, 1927 – April 9, 2021) was an American lawyer, activist, and federal government official. A progressive, New Frontier liberal, he occupied senior positions in the United States Department of Justice under Presidents John F. Kennedy and Lyndon B. Johnson, serving as United States Attorney General from 1967 to 1969; previously, he was Deputy Attorney General from 1965 to 1967 and Assistant Attorney General from 1961 to 1965.

As attorney general, Clark was known for his vigorous opposition to the death penalty, aggressive support of civil liberties and civil rights, and dedication to enforcing United States antitrust laws. Clark supervised the drafting of the Voting Rights Act of 1965 and Civil Rights Act of 1968.

After leaving public office, Clark led many progressive activism campaigns, including opposition to the war on terror. He offered advice or legal defense to such prominent figures as Charles Taylor, Slobodan Milošević, Saddam Hussein, Colonel Muammar Gaddafi, and Lyndon LaRouche. He was the last surviving Cabinet member of the Lyndon B. Johnson administration.

== Early life and career ==
Clark was born in Dallas, Texas, on December 18, 1927, the son of jurist Tom C. Clark and his wife Mary Jane (née Ramsey). Clark's father served as United States Attorney General from 1945 to 1949 under President Harry S. Truman and then became a Supreme Court Justice in August 1949. His maternal grandfather was William Franklin Ramsey, who served on the Supreme Court of Texas, and his paternal grandfather, lawyer William Henry Clark, was president of the Texas Bar Association.

Clark attended Woodrow Wilson High School in Washington, D.C., but dropped out at the age of 17 in order to join the United States Marine Corps, seeing action in Western Europe in the final months of World War II; he served until 1946. Back in the U.S., he earned a Bachelor of Arts from the University of Texas at Austin in 1949, and obtained a Master of Arts in American history from the University of Chicago and a J.D. degree from the University of Chicago Law School in 1950 and 1951, respectively. While at the University of Texas, he was a member of the Delta Tau Delta fraternity.

He was admitted to the Texas bar in 1950, and was admitted to practice before the Supreme Court of the United States in 1956. From 1951 to 1961, Clark practiced law as an associate and partner at his father's Texas law firm, Clark, Reed and Clark.

== Kennedy and Johnson administrations ==
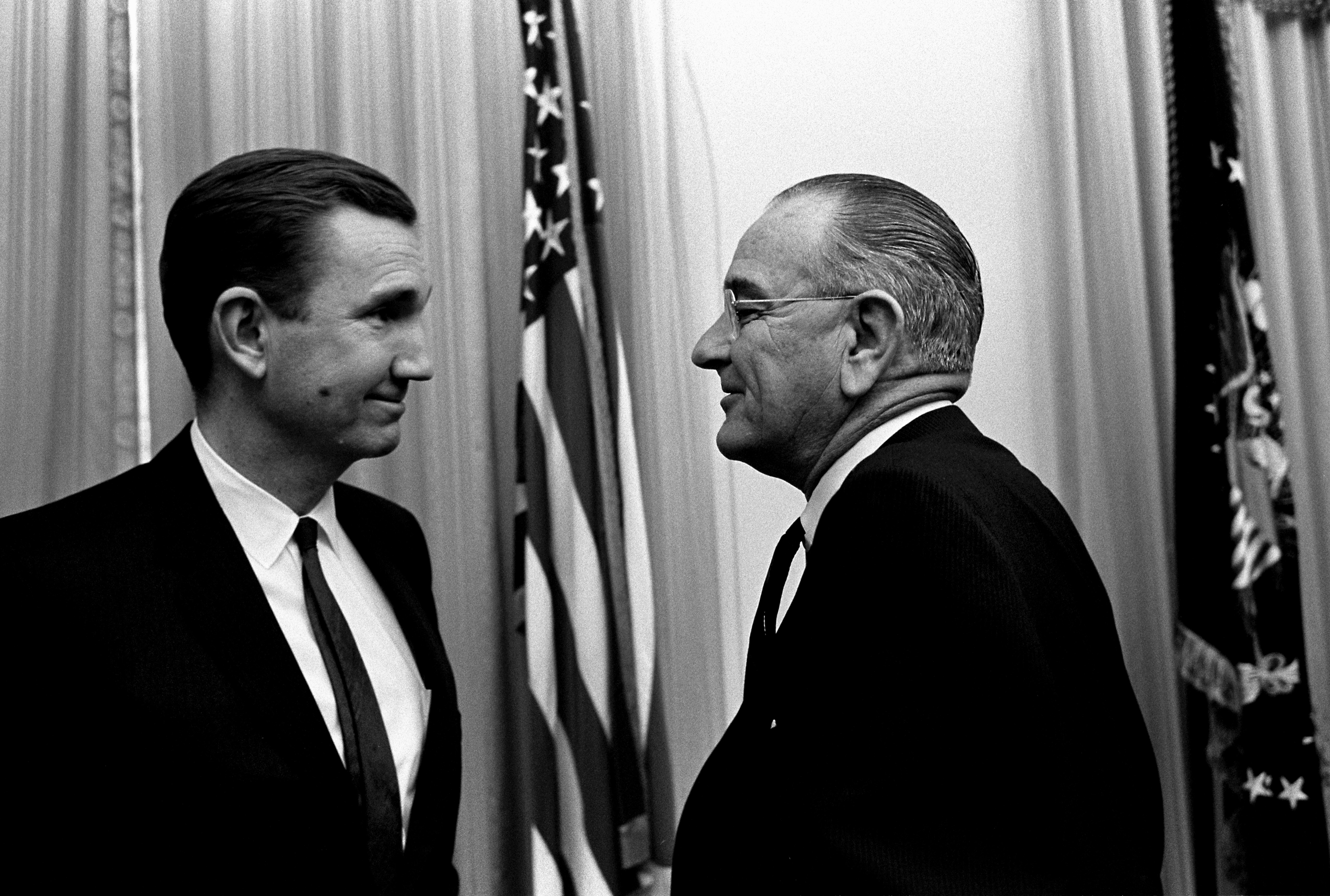
Attorney General Clark and President Lyndon B. Johnson in 1967

In the Kennedy and Johnson administrations, Clark occupied senior positions in the Justice Department; he was Assistant Attorney General, overseeing the department's Lands Division from 1961 to 1965, and then served as Deputy Attorney General from 1965 to 1967.

In 1967, President Lyndon B. Johnson nominated him to be Attorney General of the United States. He was confirmed by the Senate and took the oath of office on March 2. Clark was one of Johnson's popular and successful cabinet appointments, being described as "able, independent, liberal and soft-spoken" and a symbol of the New Frontier liberals; he had also built a successful record, especially in his management of the Justice Department's Lands Division; he had increased the efficiency of his division and had saved enough money from his budget so that he had asked Congress to reduce the budget by $200,000 annually.

However, there also was speculation that one of the reasons that contributed to Johnson's making the appointment was the expectation that Clark's father, Associate Justice Tom C. Clark, would resign from the Supreme Court to avoid a conflict of interest. Johnson wanted a vacancy to be created on the Court so he could appoint Thurgood Marshall, the first African American justice. The elder Clark assumed senior status on June 12, 1967, effectively resigning from the Supreme Court and creating the vacancy Johnson apparently desired.

During his years at the Justice Department, Clark played an important role in the history of the civil rights movement. He:

- supervised the federal presence at Ole Miss during the week following the admission of James Meredith;
- surveyed all school districts in the South desegregating under court order (1963);
- supervised federal enforcement of the court order protecting the 1965 Selma to Montgomery marches;
- headed the Presidential task force to Watts following the 1965 riots; and
- supervised the drafting and executive role in passage of the Voting Rights Act of 1965 and Civil Rights Act of 1968.

As attorney general during part of the Vietnam War, Clark oversaw the prosecution of the Boston Five for "conspiracy to aid and abet draft resistance." Four of the five were convicted, including pediatrician Dr. Benjamin Spock and Yale chaplain William Sloane Coffin Jr., but in later years, Clark expressed his regret at the prosecution's victory: "We won the case, that was the worst part."

Official portrait as Attorney General, 1967

Clark served as Attorney General until Johnson's term as president ended on January 20, 1969. Because of Richard Nixon's attacks on Clark's liberal record during the 1968 presidential election campaign and ultimate narrow victory over Hubert H. Humphrey, relations between Johnson and Clark soured and, by inauguration day, they were no longer on speaking terms.

In addition to his government work, during this period Clark was also director of the American Judicature Society (in 1963) and national president of the Federal Bar Association in 1964–65.

== Private career ==
Following his term as Attorney General, Clark taught courses at the Howard University School of Law (1969–1972) and Brooklyn Law School (1973–1981). He was active in the anti-Vietnam War movement and visited North Vietnam in 1972 as a protest against the bombing of Hanoi. During this time he was associated with the New York law firm Paul, Weiss, Rifkind, Wharton & Garrison, but he resigned in 1973, saying, "I didn't feel like working on things I didn't believe in, I didn't think were important."

On January 28, 1970, Clark testified in the Chicago Seven trial. He was barred by Judge Julius Hoffman from testifying before the jury after Clark had testified outside the presence of the jury. Judge Hoffman upheld the prosecution's objections to 14 of defense attorney William Kunstler's 38 questions to Clark, but Clark did testify that he had told prosecutor Tom Foran to investigate the charges against the defendants through Justice Department lawyers "as is generally done in civil rights cases", rather than through a grand jury.

At the 1972 Democratic National Convention, Clark received one vote for the presidential nomination and two votes for the vice-presidential nomination.

In 1974, Clark ran as the Democratic candidate for U.S. Senator from New York; he defeated the party's designee Lee Alexander in the primary, but lost in the general election to the incumbent Jacob Javits. In the 1976 election, Clark again sought the Democratic nomination to represent New York in the Senate, but finished a distant third in the primary behind Daniel Patrick Moynihan and Congresswoman Bella Abzug.

On November 5, 1979, at the start of the Iranian hostage crisis, President Jimmy Carter instructed Clark and Senate staffer William Miller to visit Tehran and seek to open negotiations with Iranian authorities for the hostages' release; while en route, they were refused entry into the country by Ayatollah Khomeini. Defying a travel ban, Clark went to Tehran again in June 1980 to attend a conference on alleged U.S. interference in Iranian affairs, on which occasion he was granted admission. While there he both demanded the release of the hostages and criticized past U.S. support for the deposed Shah. This unauthorized trip reportedly infuriated President Carter.

== International activism ==
In 1991, Clark's Coalition to Stop U.S. Intervention in the Middle East opposed the U.S.-led war and sanctions against Iraq. Clark accused the administration of President George H. W. Bush, its officials Dan Quayle, James Baker, Dick Cheney, William Webster, Colin Powell, Norman Schwarzkopf, and "others to be named" of "crimes against peace, war crimes", and "crimes against humanity" for its conduct of the Gulf War against Iraq and the ensuing sanctions; in 1996, he added the charges of genocide and the "use of a weapon of mass destruction". Similarly, after the 1999 NATO bombing of the Federal Republic of Yugoslavia Ramsey charged and "tried" NATO on 19 counts and issued calls for its dissolution.

In September 1998, Clark led a delegation to Sudan to collect evidence in the aftermath of President Bill Clinton's bombing of the Al-Shifa pharmaceutical factory in Khartoum the previous month as part of Operation Infinite Reach. Upon returning to the U.S., the delegation held a press conference on September 22, 1998, to refute the U.S. State Department's claims that the facility had been producing VX nerve agent. U.S. officials later acknowledged that the evidence cited as the rationale for the Al-Shifa strike was weaker than initially believed.

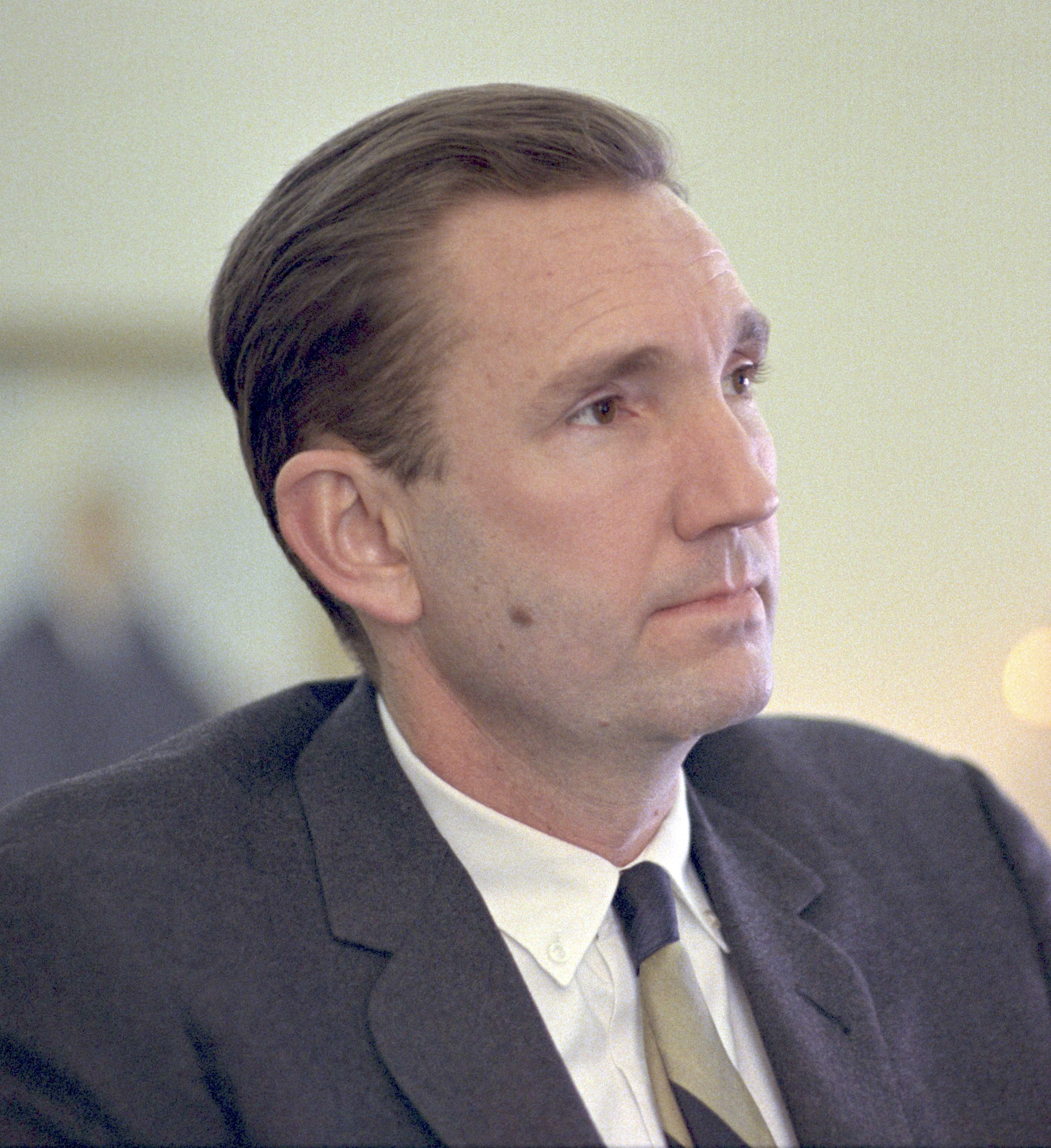
Clark in 1968

As a lawyer, Clark was criticized by both opponents and supporters for some of the people he agreed to defend, such as foreign dictators hostile to the United States; Clark stood beside and defended his clients, regardless of their own admitted actions and crimes.

In 2004, Clark joined a panel of about 20 Arab and one other non-Arab lawyers to defend Saddam Hussein in his trial before the Iraqi Special Tribunal. Clark appeared before the Iraqi Special Tribunal in late November 2005 arguing "that it failed to respect basic human rights and was illegal because it was formed as a consequence of the United States' illegal war of aggression against the people of Iraq." Clark said that unless the trial was seen as "absolutely fair", it would "divide rather than reconcile Iraq". Christopher Hitchens said Clark was admitting Hussein's guilt when Clark reportedly stated in a 2005 BBC interview: "He [Saddam] had this huge war going on, and you have to act firmly when you have an assassination attempt".

Hitchens continued to describe Clark in the following terms:

"From bullying prosecutor he mutated into vagrant and floating defense counsel, offering himself to the génocideurs of Rwanda and to Slobodan Milošević, and using up the spare time in apologetics for North Korea. He acts as front-man for the Workers World Party, which originated in a defense of the Soviet invasion of Hungary in 1956."

Sociologist and anti-communist scholar Paul Hollander wrote of Clark:

"It is likely that well before Clark took his bizarre positions in support of highly repressive, violent, and intolerant political systems and their leaders, he came to the conclusion that the United States was the most dangerous and reprehensible source of evil in the world. This overarching belief led to the reflexive sympathy and support for all the enemies and alleged victims of the United States. They include dictators of different ideological persuasion noted above, whose inhumane qualities and policies Clark was unable to discern or acknowledge, let alone condemn. It was sufficient for Clark's moral accounting that if these dictators were opposed to (and allegedly victimized by) the United States, they deserved and earned his sympathy."

Clark was not alone in criticizing the Iraqi Special Tribunal's trial of Saddam Hussein, which drew intense criticism from international human rights organizations. Human Rights Watch called Saddam's trial a "missed opportunity" and a "deeply flawed trial", and the UN Working Group on Arbitrary Detention found the trial to be unfair and to violate basic international human rights law. Among the irregularities cited by HRW, were that proceedings were marked by frequent outbursts by both judges and defendants, that three defense lawyers were murdered, that the original chief judge was replaced, that important documents were not given to defense lawyers in advance, that paperwork was lost, and that the judges made asides that pre-judged Saddam Hussein. One of the aforementioned outbursts occurred when Clark was ejected from the trial after passing the judge a memorandum stating that the trial was making "a mockery of justice". The chief judge Raouf Abdul Rahman shouted at Clark, "No, you are the mockery ... get him out. Out!"

On March 18, 2006, Clark attended the funeral of Slobodan Milošević. He commented: "History will prove Milošević was right. Charges are just that: charges. The trial did not have facts." He compared the trial of Milošević with Saddam's, stating "both trials are marred with injustice, both are flawed." He characterized Milošević and Saddam Hussein as "both commanders who were courageous enough to fight more powerful countries."

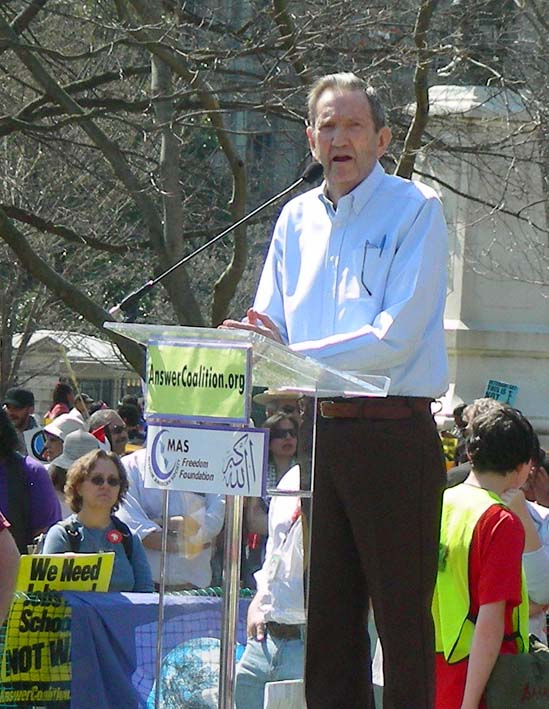
Ramsey Clark speaks to the anti-war protest in Washington, D.C., on March 20, 2010.

In June 2006, Clark wrote an article criticizing U.S. foreign policy in general, containing a list of 17 U.S. "major aggressions" introduced by "Both branches of our One Party system, Democrat and Republican, favor the use of force to have their way." (Note: Clark's list of "major aggressions" by the United States: 1. Regime change in Iran (1953), the Shah replacing democratically elected Mossadegh; Eisenhower (R).; 2. Regime change in Guatemala (1954), military government for democratically elected Arbenz; Eisenhower (R).; 3. Regime change in Republic of the Congo (Léopoldville) (1961), assassination of Patrice Lumumba; Eisenhower (R).; 4. The Vietnam War (1959–1975); Eisenhower (R), Kennedy (D), Johnson (D), Nixon (R).; 5. Invasion of the Dominican Republic (1965); Johnson (D).; 6. The Contras warfare against Nicaragua (1981–1988), resulting in regime change from the Sandinistas to corrupt capitalists; Reagan (R).; 7. Attack and occupation of Grenada (population 110,000)(1983–1987); Reagan (R); 8. Aerial attack on the sleeping cities of Tripoli and Benghazi, Libya (1986); Reagan (R).; 9. Invasion of Panama (1989–1990), regime change; George H. W. Bush (R).; 10. Gulf War (1991); George H. W. Bush (R); 11. "Humanitarian" occupation of Somalia (1992–1993), leading to 10,000 Somali deaths; George H. W. Bush (R) and Clinton (D).; 12. Aerial attacks on Iraq (1993–2001); Bill Clinton (D); 13. War against Yugoslavia (1999), 23,000 bombs and missiles dropped on Yugoslavia; Clinton (D).; 14. Missile attack in Khartoum (1998), (21 Tomahawk Cruise Missiles) destroying the Al-Shifa pharmaceutical factory which provided the majority of all medicines for Sudan; Clinton (D).; 15. Invasion and occupation of Afghanistan (2001–present), regime change; George W. Bush (R).; 16. War of aggression against Iraq and hostile occupation (2003–present); George W. Bush (R).; 17. Regime change in Haiti (2004), deposing the democratically elected Aristide for years of chaos and systematic killings; George W. Bush (R).) He followed this by saying, "The United States government may have been able to outspend the Soviet Union into economic collapse in the Cold War arms race, injuring the entire planet in the process. Now Bush has entered a new arms race and is provoking a Second Cold War."

On September 1, 2007, in New York City, Clark called for detained Filipino Jose Maria Sison's release and pledged assistance by joining the latter's legal defense team headed by Jan Fermon. Clark doubted Dutch authorities' "validity and competency", since the murder charges originated in the Philippines and had already been dismissed by the country's Supreme Court.

In November 2007, Clark visited Nandigram in India where conflict between state government forces and villagers resulted in the death of at least 14 villagers. In a December 2007 interview, he described the war on terror as a war against Islam.

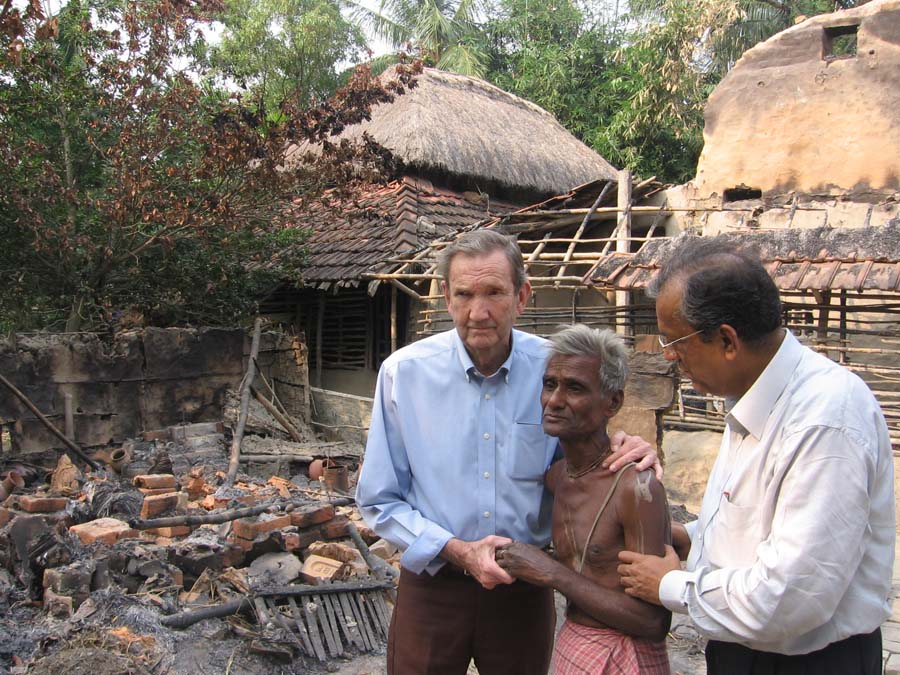
Ramsey Clark visiting Nandigram, India, November 2007

In April 2009, Clark spoke at a session of the UN's anti-racism Durban Review Conference at which he accused Israel of genocide.

In September 2010, an essay on torture by Clark was published in a three-part paperback entitled The Torturer in the Mirror (Seven Stories Press).

Clark was a recipient of the 1992 Gandhi Peace Award, and also the Peace Abbey Courage of Conscience Award for his commitment to civil rights, his opposition to war and military spending and his dedication to providing legal representation to the peace movement, particularly, his efforts to free Leonard Peltier. In 1999, he traveled to Belgrade to receive an honorary doctorate from Belgrade University.

In 2008, the United Nations awarded him its Prize in the Field of Human Rights for "his steadfast insistence on respect for human rights and fair judicial process for all".

== Advocating the impeachment of George W. Bush ==
VoteToImpeach
- Founded: 2002
- Dissolved: January 20, 2009
- Type: Political advocacy
- Purpose: Impeachment of Bush administration members
- Location: Washington, D.C.
- Region served: United States
- Members: Reported over 1,000,000 signatories
- Key people: Ramsey Clark (founder)

In 2002, Clark founded "VoteToImpeach", an organization advocating the impeachment of President George W. Bush and several members of his administration. For the duration of Bush's terms in office, Clark sought, unsuccessfully, for the House of Representatives to bring articles of impeachment against Bush. He was the founder of the International Action Center, which holds significant overlapping membership with the Workers' World Party. Clark and the IAC helped found the protest organization A.N.S.W.E.R. (Act Now to Stop War and End Racism).

On March 19, 2003, the New Jersey newspaper and website The Independent reported Clark's efforts to impeach Bush and others, prior to the start of the Iraq War. The paper commented: "Clark said there is a Web site, www.votetoimpeach.org, dedicated to collecting signatures of U.S. citizens who want President George W. Bush impeached, and that approximately 150,000 have signed to impeach, he said." The Weekly Standard magazine stated in an article dated February 27, 2004, "Ramsey Clark's VoteToImpeach.org is a serious operation", and said the group had run full-sized newspaper advertising on both coasts of the U.S. though the Standard also went on to describe them as also being an "angry petition stage."

Clark's speech to a counter-inauguration protest on January 20, 2005, at John Marshall Park in Washington, D.C., was broadcast by Democracy Now in which Clark stated: "We've had more than 500,000 people sign on 'Vote to Impeach'." The San Francisco Bay Guardian listed the website as one of three "Impeachment links", alongside afterdowningstreet.org and impeachpac.org.

The organization, under Clark's guidance, drafted its own articles of impeachment against President Bush, Vice President Richard B. Cheney, Secretary of Defense Donald Rumsfeld, and Attorney General John Ashcroft. The document argues that the four committed, "violations and subversions of the Constitution of the United States of America in an attempt to carry out with impunity crimes against peace and humanity and war crimes and deprivations of the civil rights of the people of the United States and other nations, by assuming powers of an imperial executive unaccountable to law and usurping powers of the Congress, the Judiciary and those reserved to the people of the United States." Votetoimpeach.org claimed to have collected over one million signatures in favor of impeachment as of January 2009.

== Notable clients ==
As a lawyer, Clark also provided legal counsel and advice to prominent figures, including many controversial individuals.

Regarding his role as a defense lawyer in the trial of Saddam Hussein, Clark said: "A fair trial in this case is absolutely imperative for historical truth." Clark stated that by the time he decided to join Hussein's defense team, it was clear that "proceedings before the Iraqi Special Tribunal would corrupt justice both in fact and in appearance and create more hatred and rage in Iraq against the American occupation...affirmative measures must be taken to prevent prejudice from affecting the conduct of the case and the final judgment of the court...For there to be peace, the days of victor's justice must end."

A partial listing of persons who have reportedly received legal counsel and advice from Ramsey Clark includes:

- Lori Berenson, an American convicted of support of MRTA guerrillas in Peru.
- Bruce Beyer, Vietnam War resistor
- Father Philip Berrigan, a Catholic priest and antiwar activist (one of the Harrisburg Seven). Clark served as defense counsel at trial and won an acquittal.
- Young church worker Jennifer Casolo, charged by Salvadoran authorities in 1989 with aiding the Farabundo Marti National Liberation Front. Clark traveled to El Salvador to aid in her defense. Casolo was released and deported to the U.S. after 18 days in police detention.
- Radovan Karadžić, former Bosnian Serb politician. In the 1990s, Clark represented Karadžić in a civil suit brought by Croats and Muslims from the former Yugoslavia who sued Karadžić under the Alien Tort Claims Act of 1789 and Torture Victims Protection Act of 1992 for atrocities and human rights abuses committed during the Bosnian War.
- About 100 survivors and relatives of the dead members of the Branch Davidian sect, whose Mount Carmel compound besieged by federal agents in a 51-day Waco siege in 1993, resulting in the death of about 80 members. Clark represented the plaintiffs in a suit alleging wrongful death and excessive force, giving an impassioned closing argument in which he called the siege "the greatest domestic law enforcement tragedy in the history of the United States." In a trial in 2000, the jury returned a verdict for the government.
- Lyndon LaRouche.
- Nazi concentration camp commandant Karl Linnas.
- Camilo Mejía, a U.S. soldier who deserted his post.
- The National Organization for the Reform of Marijuana Laws Advisory Board during the 1970s and early 1980s. The R in the organization's NORML acronym initially stood for "Repeal," but Clark convinced founder Keith Stroup that politicians would find reform more palatable.
- American Indian Movement prisoner Leonard Peltier.
- Elizaphan Ntakirutimana, a leader in the Rwandan genocide.
- Palestine Liberation Organization leaders in a lawsuit brought by the family of Leon Klinghoffer, who was murdered during hijacking of the Achille Lauro.
- Nazi War criminal Jakob "Jack" Reimer, charged for the killings of Jews in Warsaw.
- Liberian dictator Charles Taylor during his 1985 fight against extradition from the United States to Liberia, Taylor would later be convicted of crimes against humanity.
- Civil rights attorney Stephen Yagman, whose disbarment from U.S. federal court was sought based on his harsh criticism of a federal judge, William Duffy Keller, calling him an anti-Semite and saying he had been drunk on the bench. The disbarment never went into effect and later was reversed.

== In popular culture ==
In Aaron Sorkin's 2020 film The Trial of the Chicago 7, Clark was portrayed by Michael Keaton.

== Personal life and death ==
Clark married Georgia Welch, a classmate from the University of Texas, on April 16, 1949. They had two children, Ronda Kathleen Clark and Tom Campbell Clark II. His wife died on July 3, 2010, at the age of 81. His son Tom died from cancer on November 23, 2013.

Clark died at age 93 at his home in Greenwich Village in New York City on April 9, 2021.

== Works ==
- Clark, Ramsey (1970). Crime in America: Observations on Its Nature Causes Prevention and Control. Simon & Schuster. ISBN 978-067120407-5.
- — (1974). Crime and Justice. The Great Contemporary Issues. New York: Arno Press. ISBN 978-040504167-9.
- — (1992a). The Fire This Time: U.S. War Crimes in the Gulf. Thunder's Mouth Press. ISBN 978-156025047-0.
- — (1992b). War Crimes: A Report on U.S. War Crimes Against Iraq. Maisonneuve Press. ISBN 978-094462415-9.
- — (1998). Challenge to Genocide: Let Iraq Live. International Action Center. ISBN 978-096569164-2.
- — (2000). NATO in the Balkans: Voices of Opposition. International Action Center. ISBN 978-096569162-8.
- — (2002a) [First published 1996]. The Impact of Sanctions on Iraq: The Children Are Dying (2nd ed.). World View Forum. ISBN 978-096569163-5.
- — (2002b). "Appendix: On the fiftieth anniversary of the Universal Declaration of Human Rights". Acts of Aggression: Policing "Rogue" States. By Chomsky, Noam; Zangana, Haifa. Seven Stories Press. ISBN 978-158322546-2.
- —; Doebbler, Curtis (2011). The Iraqi Special Tribunal: An Abuse of Justice [Draft Report] (Report). Lulu.com. ASIN B08KWYBVZ5.
- —; Douglass, Frederick; Danticat, Edwidge; Dupuy, Ben; Laraque, Paul (2010). Chin, Pat; Dunkel, Greg; Flounders, Sara; Ives, Kim (eds.). Haiti: A Slave Revolution: 200 Years After 1804 (Updated ed.). Youth & The Military Education Project (US). ISBN 978-097475214-3.
- — (2010). "Torture, the Cruelest of All Human Acts, Is a Crime in America". The Torturer in the Mirror. By Reifer, Thomas Ehrlich; Zangana, Haifa (First ed.). Seven Stories Press. ISBN 978-158322913-2.

== See also ==
- List of peace activists
- Progressive Party (South Korea, 2017)

== Notes ==
Legal offices
| Preceded by Perry W. Morton | United States Assistant Attorney General for the Environment and Natural Resources Division; 1961–1965 | Succeeded by Edwin L. Weisl Jr. |
| Preceded by Nicholas Katzenbach | United States Deputy Attorney General; 1965–1967 | Succeeded by Warren Christopher |
| Preceded by Nicholas Katzenbach | United States Attorney General; 1966–1969; Acting: 1966–1967 | Succeeded by John N. Mitchell |
Party political offices
| Preceded by Paul O'Dwyer | Democratic nominee for U.S. Senator from New York (Class 3); 1974 | Succeeded by Elizabeth Holtzman |
