= Perry W. Morton =

American attorney (1907–1967)

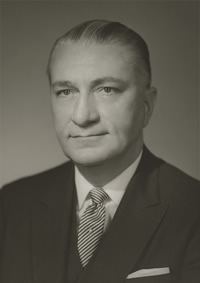

16th United States Assistant Attorney General for the Environment and Natural Resources
- In office 1953–1961
- President: Dwight D. Eisenhower
- Preceded by: James M. McInerney
- Succeeded by: Ramsey Clark

Personal details
- Born: June 28, 1907; Omaha, Nebraska, U.S.
- Died: January 15, 1967 (aged 59); Springfield, Massachusetts, U.S.
- Political party: Republican

Perry W. Morton (June 28, 1907 – January 15, 1967) was an American attorney who served as the United States Assistant Attorney General for the Environment and Natural Resources from 1953 to 1961.
