= Gary Tinterow =

American art historian

- Born: 1953 (age 72–73); Louisville, Kentucky, U.S.
- Occupations: Art historian Curator
- Spouse: Christopher Gardner
- Relatives: Ann Richards (first cousin once removed)

Academic background
- Education: Brandeis University; Harvard University

Academic work
- Discipline: Art history
- Sub-discipline: 19th-century French art
- Institutions: Metropolitan Museum of Art; Museum of Fine Arts, Houston

Gary Tinterow OAL (born 1953) is an American art historian and curator. A specialist on 19th-century French art, Tinterow is currently Director and Margaret Alkek Williams Chair of the Museum of Fine Arts, Houston.

== Career ==
Born in Louisville, but raised in Houston, Tinterow graduated from Bellaire High School in 1972. His mother once took Tinterow to visit Houston's most famous art patron, Dominique de Menil. "I remember the trailers before there was the [Menil] museum; remember seeing a Magritte surrealist exhibition that blew my mind; remember being fascinated by an exhibition of Cubist collages"

He received a Bachelor of Arts in American Studies from Brandeis University in 1976. His senior honors thesis was on Jewish architecture and was titled "Post-World War II Synagogue Architecture in America." Tinterow received a Master of Arts in Art History from Harvard University in 1983.

At Harvard's Fogg Art Museum, Tinterow curated an important exhibition of Picasso's works on paper in 1981, the first exclusive showing of this material in the U.S. since Alfred Stieglitz's historic show of 1911 in New York City. This exhibition, which featured over 100 drawings and watercolors, drew from over 50 museums and private collections. One quarter of the works had never been publicly exhibited before. At the time of this exhibition, Tinterow stated: "for Picasso, line was supreme," and "there is no clear stylistic line separating Picasso's drawings and paintings."

After graduating from Harvard, Tinterow was hired at the Metropolitan Museum of Art, where he would remain until 2012. There, his final title was the Engelhard Chairman of the Department of Nineteenth-Century, Modern, and Contemporary Art.

During his time at the Metropolitan Museum, Tinterow was part of a group of curators who organized the Association of Art Museum Curators, which was an outgrowth of the Metropolitan's Forum of Curators and Conservators. The group was formalized in April 2001.

At the Metropolitan, Tinterow mounted important exhibitions, including Degas (1988), Origins of Impressionism (1994), Francis Bacon (2009), Manet/Velazquez (2003), and Picasso in the Metropolitan Museum of Art (2010). His acquisitions at the Metropolitan included major paintings by Géricault, Delacroix, Degas, van Gogh, and Seurat.

Some of these acquisitions were made by selling paintings that were unimportant to the collection, and using that money to buy other works that met greater institutional needs. The sale of an unimportant Monet in 2003 secured a half interest in the Wheelock Whitney collection, and led to the donation of the larger Eugene Thaw collection, resulting in a group of 220 paintings, mostly plein air sketches, that had not been well-represented the museum's collection. As a result, the Metropolitan has the best collection of this material in the country, and, according to Tinterow, one of the three best in the world.

The major collections donated to the Metropolitan during Tinterow's tenure include two gifts valued at more than a billion dollars each. The Walter H. Annenberg collection of more than 50 Impressionist and Post-Impressionist paintings was the largest such gift in many decades to the Metropolitan. The Cubist collection put together by Leonard E. Lauder focused on four key artists: Picasso, Braque, Gris, and Leger, and transformed the museum's collection.

In 2012, Tinterow, who had been a candidate for director of the Metropolitan as well as the Frick museums, returned to his native Texas. He was named Director and Margaret Alkek Williams Chair at the Museum of Fine Arts, Houston, following the death of the preceding, long-serving director, Peter Marzio. Tinterow described Houston as a cultural hub “rivaling Boston and Philadelphia.” He added: “It’s very much a community.” When he was at the Metropolitan Museum, Tinterow recalls that people would inquire, "How did you become who you are growing up in Houston, Texas?" He would reply, "I am who I am because I grew up in Houston, Texas." One of Tinterow's goals at the MFAH is "to make this a place for all people."

The first important exhibition Tinterow brought to the MFAH was Portrait of Spain: Masterpieces from the Prado, which had 100 paintings from Spain's leading museum. He said of this exhibition: "I can’t think of another occasion in the U.S., nor anywhere else for that matter, when the Prado lent this many grand paintings to a single show.” The Prado exhibition was followed by black-and-white paintings by Picasso, and Islamic art from Kuwait's al-Sabah Collection.

In 2000, Tinterow was made a Chevalier of the French Legion of Honor. In 2003 and 2012, respectively, Tinterow was named Chevalier and Officier of the Ordre des Arts et des Lettres by the Government of France. In 1986, King Juan Carlos I of Spain named Tinterow an Oficial of the Orden del Merito Civill; and in 2015 King Felipe VI made Tinterow an Oficial of the Orden de Isabel la Catolica.

== Personal life ==
Tinterow is married to Christopher Gardner, an antiquarian. Tinterow is also a first cousin once removed of Ann Richards, former Governor of Texas, through his mother's side.

== See also ==
- List of Brandeis University people
- List of gay, lesbian or bisexual people: T–V
- List of Harvard University people
- List of members of the Ordre des Arts et des Lettres
- List of people from Houston

Preceded by Peter Marzio	Director and Margaret Alkek Williams Chair; Museum of Fine Arts, Houston; 2012–present	Incumbent
