= Patrick Tufts =

American computer scientist

Patrick Tufts is a computer scientist and inventor. He created Alexa Internet's collaborative filter for creating related web site recommendations and later, one of Amazon.com's most successful product recommendation systems.
