= Françoise Blime-Dutertre =

French philosopher

Françoise Blime (born Françoise Dutertre July 11, 1939 – March 6, 2016) was a French philosopher. She was a disciple of Raymond Aron and a lifelong admirer of Levi-Strauss’ s structural anthropology, Françoise Blime was one of the few French students to have been accepted in the United States on a Fulbright Scholarship at Brandeis University, where she was trained along some of the leading thinkers behind the US social revolution of the late 1960s such as Angela Davis. Back in France, she worked relentlessly to elaborate and apply new paradigms in the French state educational systems, initially by the insertion of institutional psychopedagogy in the training courses of school teachers and later as a prominent researcher and administrator of the National Centre for Pedagogical Documentation (Centre National de la Documentation Pédagogique, CNDP), the office within the French Ministry of Education that publishes teaching training materials. Françoise Blime was also member of a number of prestigious think-tanks in the field of education, such as the Teaching League (La Ligue de l’Enseignement) and was awarded the Palmes Académiques.

== Biography ==
=== Early life ===
Françoise Blime was born Françoise Dutertre on July 11, 1939, in Paris, France. Second daughter of Maurice Dutertre (1902 – 1998) a Navy officer, and Yvonnes Delarue-Dutertre (1906–1992), a saleswoman, a swimming instructor and an artist from the Parisian branch of the Delarue family from Honfleur, Normandie.

Early on recognized as talented in school, Françoise Blime grew up in Toulon, where her father was stationed as an officer in the newly formed anti-submarine naval air force units fighting the 1940 war against French Mediterranean incursions of the Italian fleet. The family then moved to Lyon for the time of the German occupation, where her father, forcibly decommissioned and a stunt anti-British naval officer is suspected to have worked as a potential collaborator with the Vichy police. Troubles at home and the repeated bombing of Lyon suburbs made it that Francoise was interned in a catholic institutions with her brother and sister, an experience that made her a staunch anti-clerical person all of her life. Her parents separated during the war and she moved to Paris with her mother, her brother and her sister. As her mother was trying to make ends meet in post-war Paris, Françoise was sent to live with her godfather's family in Le Vesinet, a posh Western suburb of Paris. Despite her modest upbringing, her constant success in school allowed her to get into the prestigious nearby Lycée de Saint Germain-en-Laye where she excelled in all subjects and in particular in all literature-related studies. After her Baccalauréat, she was admitted at the Sorbonne Université on full scholarship where she studied philosophy.

=== Philosophical training ===
French philosopher Raymond Aron quickly noticed the excellence of Françoise an after a few years into the program at the Sorbonne supported her application to the prestigious Fulbright Scholarship that sent her to Brandeis University where she studied History of Ideas, under the guidance of the controversial German-born philosopher Herbert Marcuse. It was in Marcuse teaching seminars that she met with the American youth that were to form the militant basis of the American social revolution of the late 1960s. Among them, Angela Davis, not yet leader of the US Communist Party, whom she continued to see after she returned at the Sorbonne. It was also at Brandeis that under the teachings of Abraham Maslow, she discovered psychoanalysis. She spent the rest of her life trying to reconcile the teachings of both Marcuse and Maslow in institutional education systems. She graduated with a Masters of Arts from Brandeis University and then with a Doctorate (?) from the Sorbonne University in Paris. During her finishing time at the Sorbonne, she worked for the American pharmaceutical company Vicks,

=== A career dedicated to public education ===
It was natural from her upbringing and from her training that Françoise Blime was heading for a career in public education. After all, the only steady element of her early life was school excellence and her later training pointed at revolutionary ambitions to reform a French educational system that had been slow in evolution since the late 19th century. She started by teaching philosophy at the Lycee of Noyon, nearby Paris, while joining Fernand Oury’s movement of Pédagogie Institutionnelle and being involved in various research movements to reform education at this time when France itself was changing following the 1968 upheavals. In the early 1970s, she became a founding member of the Mouvement pour la Psycho-Pédagogie Institutionelle (movement for institutional psycho-pedagogy) along with Francoise Dolto, the famous French psychoanalyst. She then accepted a teaching position at the Ecole Normale des Instituteurs (the French national school for schoolteachers) where she was able to influence generations of teachers with new innovative learning methods. She kept her position at the Ecole Normale from 1972 to 1988. In 1988 she was appointed at the Centre National de Documentation Pédagogique (CNDP: The French Ministry of Education's agency for teaching supports) as advisor to the President, a position she held until her retirement in 2002. In 2002, she was appointed at the Ligue de l’Enseignement, a think-tank that advises the French Ministry of Education of various matters linked to progress in education, where she researched the impact of new digital tools to support teachings in the classrooms.

=== Death ===
She was diagnosed with ALS in 2015, shortly after her grandson lost his battle against cancer. She died only 9 months after being diagnosed on March 6, 2016. She is buried in Honfleur, where her family was originally from and where the family has its summer residence.

== Sources ==
- Entretient avec Françoise Blime, Cahiers Pédagogiques (French), Octobre 2010, Serie 8, Vol. 24, pp. 34–36
- http://www.cndp.fr/media-sceren/catalogue-de-films/a_l_ecole_comment_vos_enfants_apprennent_a_lire-3313.html
- http://www.persee.fr/doc/rfsp_0035-2950_1968_num_18_3_418535
- http://www.ceepi.org/francoise-blime-019H3
