= Edgar Romano =

American lawyer

Edgar N. Romano
- Education: Brandeis University (BA, 1991); The John Marshall Law School (JD, 1995)
- Occupation: Workers' Compensation Lawyer
- Website: http://www.workerslaw.com

Edgar N. Romano is an American lawyer. He is the managing senior partner at the New York City law firm Pasternack Tilker Ziegler Walsh Stanton & Romano, LLP, which concentrates on cases involving workers’ compensation, personal injury and Social Security Disability. His law firm has offices throughout NYC, including Manhattan and Brooklyn.

== Career ==
In 2008 and 2009, Romano served as President of the Workers’ Injury Law & Advocacy Group.

In 2015, Romano was named a Fellow of the College of Workers’ Compensation. He is also a past Chair of the Workers’ Compensation Section of the American Association for Justice.

Romano is currently the Immediate Past-President of the Society of New York Workers’ Compensation Bar Association.

== Awards and recognition ==
Romano was selected as one of the “Workers Compensation Notable People for 2008.”

Romano was recognized by Super Lawyers in the area of Workers’ Compensation every year from 2010 to 2024.

Since 2011, Romano has been recognized by The National Trial Lawyers as one of the Top 100 Trial Lawyers in New York.

Romano holds an AV® Preeminent rating from Martindale-Hubbell.

Romano was selected to be included in the Best Lawyers in America since 2021.

In 2024, he was honored with the N. Michael Rucka Lifetime Achievement Award by the Workers' Injury Law & Advocacy Group (WILG).
