= Egon Bittner =

American sociologist

Egon Bittner (April 16, 1921 – May 7, 2011) was an American sociologist who contributed to the sociology of policing. He was born into a Jewish family in Skřečoň, a village in Silesia, an historically much-disputed part of Czechoslovakia, now in the Czech Republic. He died in the Bay Area of San Francisco, leaving a wife, Jean (Genia Klein) and two children, Debora Seys and Tom Bittner.

== Early life ==
In the September of 1939, Poland was invaded by Nazi Germany and the Soviet Union. The invasion marked the beginning of World War II and inaugurated the Holocaust. As a Jew, Bittner was arrested and incarcerated for the whole of the war. He later attributed his survival of the concentration camp to his practical skills that he believed the SS officers under whom he worked valued.

== Education and academic career ==
Bitttner emigrated to the Los Angeles area in the United States in 1949. Shortly afterwards he married and became a naturalized American citizen. His initial interests in sociology related to phenomenology and ethnomethodology, which led to him undertaking with Donald Cressey a Ph.D. in the University of California at Los Angeles. He began his teaching career in its Riverside campus. Afterwards, from 1963 to 1968, he worked as a researcher at the University of California Medical School in San Francisco.

In the late 1960s, Bittner joined Brandeis University. While there he held the Harry Coplan Professorship in the Social Sciences, he was chair of the sociology department and supervised the dissertation of Nancy J. Chodorow. Bittner is known for his ground breaking studies of the relationships between police and society.

Bittner's most notable work is his book The Functions of the Police in Modern Society (1970), in which he argued that police are defined by their capacity to use force. Other significant works include his two articles The Police on Skid Row (1967) and Florence Nightingale in Pursuit of Willie Sutton: A Theory of the Police (1974), The Capacity to Use Force as the Core of the Police Role (1985), and his book Aspects of Police Work (1990).

Bittner's revision of his 1982 presidential address to the Society for the Study of Social Problems was published in 1983 as 'Technique and the conduct of life'.

In 1998, Bittner's contributions to police scholarship earned him the Police Executive Research Forum's Leadership Award.

The Bittner Award is in honor of Egon Bittner and is presented by the Commission on Accreditation for Law Enforcement Agencies (CALEA) to chief executive officers in recognition of their distinguished service in law enforcement and their leadership of an agency accredited by CALEA for fifteen continuous years.

== Selected publications ==
=== Articles ===
- Bittner, Egon (1963). "Radicalism and the organization of radical movements". American Sociological Review. 28 (6): 928–940. doi:10.2307/2090312. JSTOR 2090312.
- —— (1965). "The concept of organization". Social Research. 32 (3): 239–255. JSTOR 40969788.
- —— (1967). "Police discretion in emergency apprehension of mentally ill persons". Social Problem. 14 (3): 278–292. doi:10.2307/799150. JSTOR 799150.
- —— (1967). "The police on skid-row: A study of peace keeping". American Sociological Review. 32 (5): 699–715. doi:10.2307/2092019. JSTOR 2092019.
- —— (1968). "The structure of psychiatric influence". Mental Hygiene. 52 (3): 423–430. PMID 5758954.
- —— (1974). "Florence Nightingale in pursuit of Willie Sutton: A theory of the police". The Potential for Reform of Criminal Justice. 3 (1): 233–268.
- —— (1983). "Technique and the conduct of life". Social Problems. 30 (3): 249–261. doi:10.2307/800351. JSTOR 800351.

=== Miscellaneous ===
- Bittner, Egon (1985). "The capacity to use force as the core of the police role". In Elliston, Frederick A.; Feldberg, Michael (eds.). Moral issues in police work. Totowa, New Jersey: Rowman & Allanheld. ISBN 0-8476-7191-7.
- Bittner, Egon (1968). "Radicalism". In Sills, David L. (ed.). International Encyclopedia of the Social Sciences. Vol. 13. New York: The Macmillan Company & The Free Press. pp. 294–300.

=== Books ===
- Bittner, Egon (November 1970). The functions of the police in modern society. Chevy Chase, Maryland: Center for Studies of Crime and Delinquency, Institute of Mental Health.
- —— (1990). Aspects of police work. Boston: Northeastern University Press. ISBN 1-55553-069-9.
