= Lynn L. Silver =

American scientist

Lynn L. Silver was an American born scientist best known for her contributions to the field of antibacterial discovery and development. With over 30 years of experience in the antibacterial discovery field and over 70 peer reviewed publications, Silver provides insight and advice to the research community on global advisory panels, international collaborations for addressing antibiotic resistance issues. Silver has published several highly cited reviews in the field of antibacterial discovery. Born September 12, 1946, in New York City, NY, she grew up in Saratoga Springs, NY. Lynn died at age 79 on April 29, 2026.

== Education and scientific career ==
Silver received her BA in Biology from Brandeis University in 1968 She then went on to graduate research in molecular biology and microbiology at Tufts University, where she was awarded her Ph.D. in 1975. After completing her Ph. D, Silver did postdoctoral research studying DNA replication, an important target for antibacterial interventions, at the University of Geneva in the laboratory of Professor Lucien Caro. She then worked as a Staff Fellow/Senior Staff Fellow at the National Institutes of Health in the laboratory of Dr. Nancy Nossal study the genetics of bacteriophage T4. Silver was then hired as a research scientist at Merck Research Laboratories in 1982 where as a senior scientist she became a leading researcher in the discovery of novel antibiotics.

== Scientific contributions ==
Her extensive research on natural products as templates for antibiotics has made her one of the leading experts in the field as evidenced by her highly cited publications. She has led multidisciplinary antibacterial discovery and development teams supporting chemical synthetic projects on improved antibacterials, and preclinical evaluation of antibacterial drug candidates. Her research includes seminal contributions in the understanding of the mode of action and mechanism of resistance of inhibitors of lipid A synthesis, DNA replication, cell wall synthesis, protein synthesis, and fatty acid synthesis. She has contributed to the discovery of new antibacterials to overcome antibiotic resistance and toxicity issues through modification and optimization of macrolides, glycopeptides, and beta-lactams. In recognition of her contributions to the field of microbiology, Silver was elected as a fellow of the American Academy of Microbiology in 2018.

== Professional activities ==
- Editorial Board, Antimicrobial Agents and Chemotherapy
- Scientific Advisory Board, Combating Antibacterial Resistant Bacteria (CARB-X)
- Expert Advisor, Global Antibiotic Research and Development Partnership (GARDP)
- Discovery Expert Advisor, Pew Charitable Trust Shared Platform for Antibiotic Research and Knowledge (SPARK)
- Reviewer on NIH Study Sections

== Patent ==
- Issued US Patent number 6,221,859 Carbapenem antibacterial compositions and methods of the treatment. Dorso; Karen L. (Franklin Park, NJ), Jackson; Jesse J. (Howell, NJ), Gill; Charles J. (Beachwood, NJ), Kohler; Joyce (Woodbridge, NJ), Silver; Lynn L. (Westfield, NJ)

== Representative publications in peer reviewed journals ==
There are over 11000 citations of Silver's publications, and she has an h-index of 38

- Silver, Lynn L. Challenges of Antibacterial Discovery. Clinical Micro Reviews 2011, 24:71-109.
- Theuretzbacher U, Gottwalt S, Beyer P, Butler M, Czaplewski L, Lienhardt C, Moja L, Paul M, Paulin S, Rex JH, Silver LL, Spigelman M, Thwaites GE, Paccaud JP, Harbarth S. Analysis of the clinical antibacterial and antituberculosis pipeline. Lancet Infect Dis. 2019 Feb;19(2):e40-e50. doi: 10.1016/S1473-3099(18)30513-9.
- Tacconelli E, Carrara E, Savoldi A, Harbarth S, Mendelson M, Monnet DL, Pulcini C, Kahlmeter G, Kluytmans J, Carmeli Y, Ouellette M, Outterson K, Patel J, Cavaleri M, Cox EM, Houchens CR, Grayson ML, Hansen P, Singh N, Theuretzbacher U, Magrini N; WHO Pathogens Priority List Working Group. Discovery, research, and development of new antibiotics: the WHO priority list of antibiotic-resistant bacteria and tuberculosis. Lancet Infect Dis. 2018 Mar;18(3):318-327. doi: 10.1016/S1473-3099(17)30753-3. Epub 2017 Dec 21.
- Singh SB, Young K, Silver LL. What is an "ideal" antibiotic? Discovery challenges and path forward.. Biochem Pharmacol. 2017 Jun 1;133:63-73. doi: 10.1016/j.bcp.2017.01.003. Epub 2017 Jan 10.
- Silver LL. A Gestalt approach to Gram-negative entry. Bioorg Med Chem. 2016 Dec 15;24(24):6379-6389. doi: 10.1016/j.bmc.2016.06.044. Epub 2016 Jun 23
- Silver LL. Appropriate Targets for Antibacterial Drugs. Cold Spring Harb Perspect Med. 2016 Dec 1;6(12).
- Silver LL. Antibacterials for any target. Nat Biotechnol. 2014 Nov;32(11):1102-4. doi: 10.1038/nbt.3060
- East SP, Silver LL. Multitarget ligands in antibacterial research: progress and opportunities. Expert Opin Drug Discov. 2013 Feb;8(2):143-56. doi: 10.1517/17460441.2013.743991. Epub 2012 Dec 19.
- Silver LL. Are natural products still the best source for antibacterial discovery? The bacterial entry factor. Expert Opin Drug Discov. 2008;3(5):487‐500. doi:10.1517/17460441.3.5.487
- Young K, Jayasuriya H, Ondeyka JG, et al. Discovery of FabH/FabF inhibitors from natural products. Antimicrob Agents Chemother. 2006;50(2):519‐526.
- Ali A, Taylor GE, Ellsworth K, et al. Novel pyrazolo[3,4-d]pyrimidine-based inhibitors of Staphlococcus aureus DNA polymerase III: design, synthesis, and biological evaluation. J Med Chem. 2003;46(10):1824‐1830. doi:10.1021/jm020483c
- Silver LL. Novel inhibitors of bacterial cell wall synthesis. Curr Opin Microbiol. 2003;6(5):431‐438. doi:10.1016/j.mib.2003.08.004
