= Theo Wallimann =

Swiss biologist

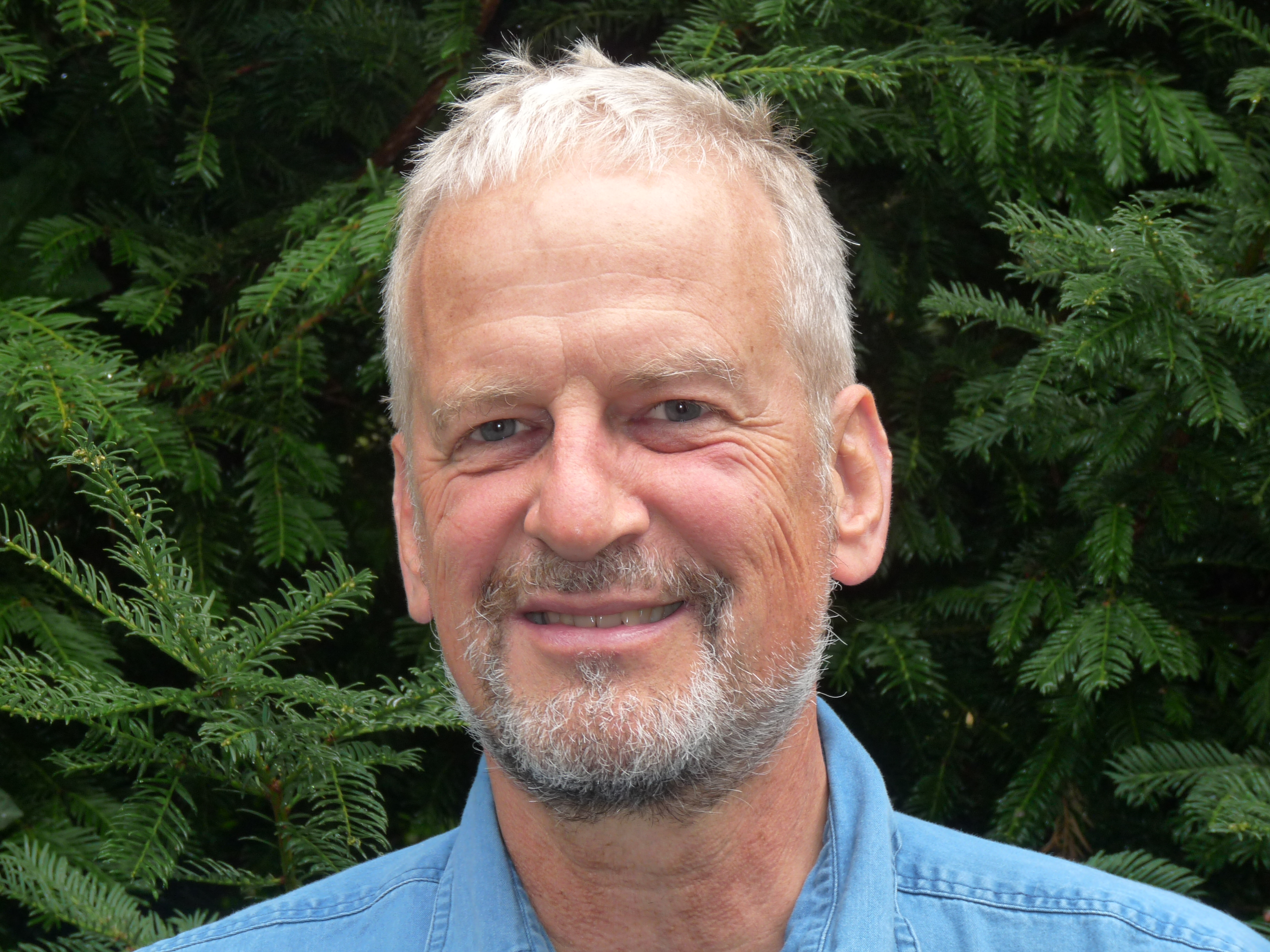
Theo Wallimann, a Swiss biologist

Theo Wallimann (born 13 October 1946 in Alpnach, Obwalden, Switzerland) is a Swiss biologist who was research group leader and Adjunct-Professor at the Institute of Cell Biology ETH Zurich and later at the Institute of Molecular Health Science https://mhs.biol.ethz.ch/about-us/emeriti-formermembers/wallimann.html at the ETH Zurich at the Biology Department https://biol.ethz.ch/en/, of the ETH Zurich, Switzerland.

== Research and career ==
In 1975, Theo Wallimann completed his Ph.D. Dissertation on “M-line-bound Creatine Kinase and Myofibrillar Structure” in the laboratory of Prof. Hans M. Eppenberger at the Institute of Cell Biology at ETH Zurich with distinction and received the ETH prize and medal.

From 1975 - 1981, Wallimann worked as a post-doctoral research associate with Andrew G. Szent-Györgyi , at the Biology Department of Brandeis University on the subject of "Myosin-linked calcium regulation of muscle contraction". After rejoining the Biology Dept of the ETH-Zurich in 1981, Wallimann became a Lecturer in 1984 with his Habilitation on: "Localization and function of M-line-bound creatine kinase: M-band model and Phospho-Creatine Shuttle"). In 1994, Wallimann was awarded the title of Professor and in the next two years he became Head and Deputy Head of the Institute of Cell Biology. Wallimann resigned from his post in June 2008 and is now Emeritus and member of the ETH Alumni organisation.

In 2005, Wallimann was awarded with the Alfred-Vogt-Prize in 2005

and in 2023, 2024 and 2025 he received the Research.com Recognition Leader Award for Biology and Biochemistry in Switzerland.

In 2025, Theo Wallimann has been honored by the International Society of Sports Nutrition with a “Life-time Achievement Award” for his research on the «Creatine Kinase System and Creatine», at the Internatl. Congress on «Creatine for Health», held during March 12th-16th 2025 in Munich, Germany: https://creatineforhealth.com/creatine-conference-2025/

Wallimann's main areas of interest are:

- The high-resolution atomic structure, molecular physiology and subcellular compartmentation of creatine kinase (CK) isoenzymes (https://pubmed.ncbi.nlm.nih.gov/10737943/), (https://pubmed.ncbi.nlm.nih.gov/10595529/) and (https://pubmed.ncbi.nlm.nih.gov/10737943/) and of the Creatine Transporter (CRT), and in general, micro-compartmentation and metabolite channeling by multi-enzyme complexes.
- The mechanisms of the cell enhancing and neuro-protective effects of creatine supplementation in health (muscle strength, learning and memory) and disease (neuromuscular and neuro-degenerative disorders).(see the recent Conference Volume on "Creatine Supplementation for Health and Clinical Diseases" (2022) https://exerciseandsportnutritionlab.com/news/creatine-in-health-book-published/
- The structure and molecular physiology of AMP-activated protein kinase (AMPK), involved in cellular energy homeostasis and nutritional signalling, which is relevant for type-2 diabetes, obesity, metabolic syndrome and cancer.(for publications in PubMed see: and).
