= Rosie Rosenzweig =

American scholar

Rosie Rosenzweig is a resident scholar at Brandeis University's Women's Studies Research Center. She studies creativity, Jewish feminism, and meditation. She has received both her B.A. in English and M.A. in English and American literature from Indiana University. Rosenzweig also writes a Boston Jewish Spirituality Column via examiner.com.

She has compiled her interviews into a book, which features women artists and concentrates on their process, not their product. This includes all facets of their experience before the final product is produced. Artists reveal how they get out of their "stuck" places, or use their lives to express resolutions to various personal events. The filmed interviews will be made into a documentary.
