= Dan Blum =

American author

- Born: 1958 (age 67–68); Boston, Massachusetts, U.S.
- Education: Brandeis University (B.A.)
- Occupations: Writer, blogger
- Writing career
- Pen name: Dan Allan
- Language: English
- Period: 2003–present
- Genres: Fiction
- Notable works: The Feet Say Run; Lisa33

Dan Blum (born 1958) is an American author. His most recent book is The Feet Say Run (Gabriel's Horn Press, 2016), a literary novel set in World War II. The novel tells the tale of Hans Jaeger in Nazi Germany, the Jewish girl he loved, and his years fighting with the Wehrmacht.

Blum generated controversy with the publication of The Feet Say Run, with some calling the book "an apology for the perpetrators of the Holocaust". He responded to these criticisms in an article published in Publishers Weekly by defending his right as an author to publish based on "a time and a place and a set of individuals living in that place".

Blum is also the author of Lisa 33 (Viking Press, 2003), a postmodern comedy set on the Internet, which was published under the pseudonym Dan Allan and received positive attention and reviews from Kirkus Reviews and Entertainment Weekly.

Blum was interviewed by Psychology Today on the challenges of writing and publishing fiction. He has appeared on the popular Spectrum Books podcast speaking about the transition from a publishing deal with a New York publishing house to working with an independent publisher. Blum has also spoken extensively with the literary community about the writing process and ethics of his content.

Blum wrote the original screenplay for the upcoming film Caroline Fletcher, starring Chris Elliot which follows 11-year-old Caroline (Kayla Anjali), a clever, sharp-eyed girl navigating a life of excitement and peril as a shoplifter with her mom Jocelyn (Katrina Bowden). When Caroline’s estranged father Corey (Drew Van Acker) — a charming, small-town con artist — gets out of prison and re-enters their lives, things briefly seem to settle."

Blum runs a humor and political satire blog The Rotting Post.

== Published works ==
Novels

- Lisa33. Viking Press. 2003. ISBN 978-1-101-19093-7.
- The Feet Say Run. Gabriel's Horn Press. 2016. ISBN 978-1-938-99022-9.
