= Charlene Liu =

American artist

Charlene Liu is an artist and educator based in Eugene, Oregon. Born in Taiwan and raised in the American Midwest, Liu is a Professor of Art at the University of Oregon.

== Education ==
Liu received a M.F.A. in Visual Arts from Columbia University and a B.A. from Brandeis University.

== Career and Work ==
Liu's paintings, prints, and mixed media installations weave together familial histories, cultural tropes, and decorative motifs to explore the malleable conditions of memory, heritage, and identity. Her imagery draws freely from nature, food, ephemera, still life paintings, Rococo ornamentation, and East Asian art and design. Liu's luminous, layered compositions evoke multi-layered realities, fluid states, and imaginative realms through material process, vibrant colors, and playful juxtapositions. Her installation China Palace was recently featured in Another Beautiful Country, Moving Images by Asian American Artists curated by Jenny Lin, PhD at USC Pacific Asia Museum in Pasadena, CA. Liu is a 2024 Hallie Ford Fellow in the Visual Arts through The Ford Family Foundation.

Liu has exhibited work at the Jordan Schnitzer Museum of Art at Portland State University, the Tacoma Art Museum, Crow's Shadow Institute of the Arts, Schneider Museum of Art, Elizabeth Leach Gallery in Portland, Oregon, Shaheen Modern & Contemporary in Cleveland, Ohio, Andrea Rosen Gallery 2 in New York, Taylor de Cordoba Gallery in Los Angeles, and Galeria Il Capricorno in Venice, Italy. Her work has been reviewed in The New York Times, Flash Art International, Los Angeles Times, and is held in corporate collections and in the collections of the Museum of Modern Art (New York City), Progressive Art Collection (Cleveland), Tacoma Art Museum (Tacoma, Washington), and the New Museum (New York, NY).
