= Beatrice B. Magee =

American biochemist

Beatrice B. "Bebe" Magee is an American biochemist and geneticist with expertise in molecular mycology and fungal genetics. She earned her B.A. in chemistry from Brandeis University in 1962 and her M.A. in biochemistry from the University of California, Berkeley, in 1964. She has been co-author on over 40 publications in peer-reviewed journals and an invited speaker at scientific meetings including Woods Hole and Cold Spring Harbor courses as well as at professional mycology societies.

== Early life and education ==
Born Beatrice Eve Buten in Merion, Pennsylvania to parents known for their collection of Wedgwood porcelain, Magee grew up in a home which served as the Buten Museum, displaying what was then the largest collection of Wedgwood porcelain in the US.

After graduating from Lower Merion High School, she attended Brandeis University majoring in chemistry, where she undertook research into crustacyanin in the laboratory of William Jenks. Her work on this protein, responsible for the red formation of lobsters when cooked, resulted in an early scientific publication. She graduated in 1962.

She earned her Master of Science degree in biochemistry at the University of California Berkeley in 1964.

After she married fellow scientist Paul T. Magee, they moved to Paris for 2 years where she attended lectures at the Collège de France and Le Cordon Bleu. Returning to the U.S., Magee spent the next 6 years working in the laboratory of Edward Adelberg and also gave birth to 2 sons. Magee then formed what has been a more than 35-year scientific collaboration with her husband at Michigan State University and then the University of Minnesota in the College of Biological Sciences. Magee has been a guest lecturer at the Woods Hole Molecular Mycology Course and Cold Spring Harbor courses.

Magee and her husband have worked on the human fungal pathogen Candida albicans, and particularly their discovery of sexual mating in this fungus that had been thought to not have a mating cycle. They also made significant contributions to elucidate the genomic sequence and single nucleotide polymorphism mapping for this fungus.

== Personal life ==
While Magee retired as a senior scientist from the University of Minnesota in 2007, she remains active singing and rowing. She sings in the second oldest feminist chorus in the U.S., the Calliope Women's Chorus where she served as president for 4 years. She is also officiates at rowing regattas as a referee for the U.S. Rowing Association.

== Academic appointments ==
- Associate in research, Yale University, department of microbiology, 1966‑68, 1969‑71.
- Associate in research, Yale University, department of human genetics, 1972‑77.
- Specialist, Michigan State University, College of Natural Sciences, 1978‑87.
- Visiting research fellow, National Institute for Medical Research, Mill Hill, London NW7, UK, May‑August, 1985.
- Senior scientist, University of Minnesota, College of Biological Sciences, Sept. 1987‑2007.
- American Society for Microbiology Indo-American Visiting Professor, Jawaharlal Nehru University, New Delhi, India, 2006

== Awards ==
When she received the President's Outstanding Service Award from the University of Minnesota, College of Biological Sciences, the university acknowledged her as "the co-discoverer of mating in Candida"

== Selected publications ==
- Magee, B. B.; Magee, P. T. (1987). "Electrophoretic Karyotypes and Chromosome Numbers in Candida Species". Microbiology. 133 (2): 425–430. doi:10.1099/00221287-133-2-425. PMID 3309156.
- Magee, B. B.; D'Souza, T. M.; Magee, P. T. (1987). "Strain and species identification by restriction fragment length polymorphisms in the ribosomal DNA repeat of Candida species". Journal of Bacteriology. 169 (4): 1639–1643. doi:10.1128/jb.169.4.1639-1643.1987. PMC 211993. PMID 2881921.
- Magee, B B; Koltin, Y; Gorman, J A; Magee, P T (1988). "Assignment of cloned genes to the seven electrophoretically separated Candida albicans chromosomes". Molecular and Cellular Biology. 8 (11): 4721–4726. doi:10.1128/MCB.8.11.4721. PMC 365563. PMID 3062368.
- Magee, B. B.; P. T. Magee (2000). "Induction of Mating in Candida albicans by Construction of MTLa and MTLα Strains". Science. 289 (5477): 310–313. Bibcode:2000Sci...289..310M. doi:10.1126/science.289.5477.310. PMID 10894781.
- Magee, B. B.; Legrand, Melanie; Alarco, Anne-Marie; Raymond, Martine; Magee, P. T. (2002). "Many of the genes required for mating in Saccharomyces cerevisiae are also required for mating in Candida albicans". Molecular Microbiology. 46 (5): 1345–1351. doi:10.1046/j.1365-2958.2002.03263.x. PMID 12453220. S2CID 24302254.
- Legrand, Melanie; Lephart, Paul; Forche, Anja; Mueller, Frank-Michael C.; Walsh, T.; Magee, P.T.; Magee, Beatrice B. (2004). "Homozygosity at the MTL locus in clinical strains of Candida albicans: karyotypic rearrangements and tetraploid formation". Molecular Microbiology. 52 (5): 1451–1462. doi:10.1111/j.1365-2958.2004.04068.x. PMID 15165246. S2CID 8164002.*
- Jones, T.; Federspiel, N. A.; Chibana, H.; Dungan, J.; Kalman, S.; Magee, B. B.; Newport, G.; Thorstenson, Y. R.; Agabian, N.; Magee, P. T.; Davis, R. W.; Scherer, S. (2004). "The diploid genome sequence of Candida albicans". Proceedings of the National Academy of Sciences. 101 (19): 7329–7334. Bibcode:2004PNAS..101.7329J. doi:10.1073/pnas.0401648101. PMC 409918. PMID 15123810.
- Magee, B B; Sanchez, Melissa D; Saunders, David; Harris, David; Berriman, M.; Magee, PT (2017-04-17). "Extensive chromosome rearrangements distinguish the karyotype of the hypovirulent species Candida dubliniensis from the virulent Candida albicans". Fungal Genetics and Biology. 45 (3): 338–350. doi:10.1016/j.fgb.2007.07.004. PMC 2277252. PMID 17719250.
- Thewes, Sascha; Moran, Gary P.; Magee, Beatrice B.; Schaller, Martin; Sullivan, Derek J.; Hube, Bernhard (2008-10-24). "Phenotypic screening, transcriptional profiling, and comparative genomic analysis of an invasive and non-invasive strain of Candida albicans". BMC Microbiology. 8: 187. doi:10.1186/1471-2180-8-187. PMC 2579918. PMID 18950481.
- Zhang, Ningxin; Magee, Beatrice B.; Magee, Paul T.; Holland, Barbara R.; Rodrigues, Ely; Holmes, Ann R.; Cannon, Richard D.; Schmid, Jan (2017-04-17). "Selective Advantages of a Parasexual Cycle for the Yeast Candida albicans". Genetics. 200 (4): 1117–1132. doi:10.1534/genetics.115.177170. PMC 4574235. PMID 26063661.
- Schmid, Jan; Magee, Paul T.; Holland, Barbara R.; Zhang, Ningxin; Cannon, Richard D.; Magee, Beatrice B. (2016-02-01). "Last hope for the doomed? Thoughts on the importance of a parasexual cycle for the yeast Candida albicans". Current Genetics. 62 (1): 81–85. doi:10.1007/s00294-015-0516-8. PMID 26353943. S2CID 18230225.
