= Leslie Zebrowitz =

American psychologist

Dr. Leslie A. Zebrowitz is a social psychologist who studies the effects of the way people look on others' attitudes towards them. Her research has shown conclusively that babyfaced and angularly faced individuals are viewed differently. Among the effects, babyfaced individuals are seen as physically weaker, more submissive and less competent and, as Zebrowitz argued in a 2005 paper in Science, this may explain why politicians with more mature faces are more likely to win elections. She is the author of Reading Faces as well as many scholarly articles.

Zebrowitz is Professor Emerita of Social Relations at Brandeis University. She received her Ph.D. from Yale University in 1970.
