= Nancy Chodorow =

American sociologist (1944–2025)

- Born: Nancy Julia Chodorow; January 20, 1944; New York City, U.S.
- Died: October 14, 2025 (aged 81)
- Education: Radcliffe College; London School of Economics and Political Science; Harvard University; Brandeis University
- Known for: Psychoanalytical feminism
- Scientific career
- Fields: Psychoanalytic theory and clinical methods, psychoanalysis, gender and sexuality, psychoanalytic sociology and anthropology, feminist theory and methods
- Workplaces: University of California, Berkeley; Psychiatry at Harvard Medical School Wellesley College
- Doctoral advisor: Egon Bittner
- Other academic advisors: Philip Slater

Nancy Julia Chodorow (January 20, 1944 – October 14, 2025) was an American sociologist and academic. She began teaching at Wellesley College in 1973, then moved to the University of California, Santa Cruz, where she taught from 1974 until 1986. She was a Sociology and Clinical Psychology professor at the University of California, Berkeley, until 2005 and served as Professor Emeritus until her retirement. Subsequently, she taught psychiatry at Harvard Medical School/Cambridge Health Alliance.

Chodorow was the author of several works on feminist thought, including The Reproduction of Mothering: Psychoanalysis and the Sociology of Gender (1978); Feminism and Psychoanalytic Theory (1989); Femininities, Masculinities, Sexualities: Freud and Beyond (1994); and The Power of Feelings: Personal Meaning in Psychoanalysis, Gender, and Culture (1999).

== Background ==
=== Early life ===
Chodorow was born to a Jewish family in New York City, on January 20, 1944. Her parents were Marvin Chodorow, a professor of applied physics, and Leah Chodorow (née Turitz), a community activist who helped establish the Stanford Village Nursery School. In 1977, Chodorow married economist Michael Reich, with whom she had two children. They separated in 1996.

=== Education ===
Chodorow graduated from Radcliffe College in 1966, where she studied under Beatrice Whiting and W.M. Whiting. Chodorow's undergraduate work focused on personality and cultural anthropology. She received her Ph.D. in sociology from Brandeis University in 1975. Philip Slater influenced her studies and directed her focus to the unconscious phenomena of psychoanalysis. Following her PhD, Chodorow received clinical training at the University of California, Berkeley, Department of Psychology (1984–86) and the San Francisco Psychoanalytic Institute (1985–1993). She was the recipient of numerous fellowships, including Harvard Radcliffe (2001-2002), the Stanford Center for Advanced Study, the Guggenheim Foundation, the American Council for Learned Societies, and the National Endowment for the Humanities.

=== Death ===
Chodorow died on October 14, 2025, at the age of 81.

== Influences ==
=== Sigmund Freud ===
Freudian psychoanalysis is a major influence on Chodorow's work. She critiques Freudian analysis from a feminist perspective to understand the mother-child relationship. Chodorow draws on the Freudian model of female development to suggest a link between a girl's gender development and the strength of her relationship with her mother. Based on Freudian theory, Chodorow argues that the Oedipus complex symbolically separates male children from their mothers, while young girls continue to identify with and remain attached to their mothers. Chodorow posits that Freud's theory of the Oedipal conflict and revolution depends on the father being present at the right time. Chodorow suggests that females resolve their inner conflict by converting envy of male privilege into heterosexual desire.

Chodorow also uses Sigmund Freud's theory to argue that differences between men and women are largely due to capitalism and the absent father. She acknowledges economic changes occurring around 2003 and their psychological impact on rearing both sexes with regard to shared parenting. She argues that the development of shared parenting has challenged the traditional mothering role, leaving mothers and children with less time together.

Chodorow contends that Freudian theory suppresses women. She draws on Freud's concept of how nature becomes culture, creating a "second nature," to argue that gender is formed and organized through both social institutions and transformations in consciousness and psyche. She uses Freud's idea of intrapsychic structures—the id, ego, and superego—to argue that the internal workings of males and females are structurally different due to socialization, not inherent differences.

== Contributions ==
=== The Reproduction of Mothering: Psychoanalysis and the Sociology of Gender (1978) ===
Chodorow's The Reproduction of Mothering delves into four primary concepts: the unique personality traits of women, the pattern of male dominance and its potential for change, the reasons behind most women's identification as heterosexual, and the reasons behind women's desire to mother children. Chodorow observed mothering as a dual structure, shaped by childhood experience and the social structure of kinship. She posits that becoming a mother is not solely biological or instinctual. She argues that "mothering" is socially constructed and part of female personality because women are mothered by women. In her book, Chodorow argues that gender differences arise from formations of the Oedipal complex. While both male and female children experience closeness with their mothers, females seek gratification from this connection in a way that males do not. She contends that women's mothering, a common element of the sexual division of labor, positions them in the domestic sphere while men occupy the public sphere. One critique of this assertion is that it might suggest women are not psychologically suited for the public sphere. Chodorow builds on Freud's assertion of bisexuality at birth and the mother as the child's first sexual object. Drawing on Karen Horney and Melanie Klein, she suggests that the child's ego forms in reaction to the mother. Male children achieve independent agency easily, identifying with the father and emulating his interest in the mother/wife. This process is more complex for female children, who identify strongly with the mother and attempt to make the father the new love object, which hinders their ego formation.

The mother-infant bond shapes the child's identity and enables recognition of the father as separate, unless the father provides similar primary care. This separation can lead to ambivalence toward the father. Consequently, children are more obedient to their father, not because of his authority but because of the nature of the initial father-child relationship.

=== Nancy Chodorow and The Reproduction of Mothering Forty Years (2021) ===
The Reproduction of Mothering was revisited in 2021, forty years after initial publication. In this work, Chodorow writes, "The mother is the early caregiver and primary source of identification for all children ... A daughter continues to identify with the mother" explaining that this strong bond inhibits the daughter's identity formation. While the initial bond with the mother applies to both sexes, boys break away earlier to identify with their fathers, thus perpetuating the mother-daughter identification.

=== Gender personality ===
Chodorow connects the contrasting dyadic and triadic first love experiences to the social construction of gender roles, citing the universal degradation of women in culture, cross-cultural patterns in male behavior, and marital strain in Western society after Second Wave feminism. She argues that in marriage, women prioritize children over sex, which drives men away. Upon reaching sexual maturity, women devote their energy to children.

Chodorow suggests that the psyches of men and women differ due to dissimilar childhood experiences. She argues that women's fluid ego boundaries explain their greater empathy and hypothesizes that if society perceives women primarily as mothers, female liberation will be experienced as traumatic.

"The centrality of sex and gender in the categories of psychoanalysis, coupled with the tenacity, emotional centrality and sweeping power in our lives of our sense of gendered self, made psychoanalysis a particularly apposite source of feminist theorizing."

Chodorow argues that masculinity is learned consciously in the absence of the father, while femininity is embedded in the ongoing relationship with the mother. She states, “Masculinity is defined as much negatively as positively,” arguing that while female identification is a rational process, male identification is defined by rejection.

=== Feminism and Psychoanalytic Theory (1991) ===
In Feminism and Psychoanalytic Theory, Chodorow argues that men's suppression of their need for love leads to an inability to tolerate others expressing that need. Women, having not suppressed this need, tolerate emotional unresponsiveness in exchange for some love and care. Men, unable to silence this desire through repression, protect themselves from women while maintaining heterosexual relationships. Chodorow suggests that a more involved father figure could rectify these emotional ambiguities.

Chodorow posits that closeness to the mother diminishes women's sex drive toward men, while men's repressed needs result in a stronger sex drive and more romantic love. She suggests this may be the basis for male aggression toward women. She also focuses on how society values women for "being" and men for "action," tying this to women's relationship-oriented nature. She links this to Freudian theory by arguing that men pay a price for detachment from their mothers and repression of their feminine selves.

"I part company with most American psychoanalysts in my reliance on object relations theory and in that I have always seen psychoanalysis as an interpretive enterprise (not medical nor scientific). I differ from many academic humanists in seeing psychoanalysis as a social science that is theoretically grounded but, nonetheless, empirically infused study of lives."

=== The Power of Feelings: Personal Meaning in Psychoanalysis, Gender; and Culture (1999) ===
In The Power of Feelings, Chodorow addresses the relation between culture and individual identity, the role of unconscious fantasy, and the epistemology of psychoanalytic theories. She combines theoretical approaches, focusing on psychoanalysis and feminist theory, while acknowledging their shortcomings regarding gender psychology. She argues that gender identity develops through a combination of personal and cultural meanings. In 2000, she won the L. Bryce Boyer Prize for the Society for Psychological Anthropology for the book.

=== The Psychoanalytic Ear and the Sociological Eye: Toward an American Independent Tradition (2019) ===
In The Psychoanalytic Ear and the Sociological Eye, Chodorow explores the relationship between social relationships and individuality, arguing that sociology and psychoanalysis have suffered from not exploring their interconnectedness. She focuses on Erik Erikson and Hans Loewald, reflecting on her own cultural and psychoanalytic journeys.

== Books ==
- Chodorow, Nancy (2020), Nancy Chodorow and The Reproduction of Mothering Forty Years On. Editor: Petra Bueskens. Palgrave Macmillan ISBN 978-3-030-55590-0.
- The Psychoanalytic Ear and the Sociological Eye: Toward an American Independent Tradition.
- Chodorow, Nancy (2019), "The Psychoanalytic Ear and the Sociological Eye: Toward an American Independent Tradition," New York: Routledge, ISBN 978-0367134211.
- Chodorow, Nancy (2012), "Individualizing Gender and Sexuality: Theory and Practice," New York: Routledge, ISBN 9780415893589.
- Chodorow, Nancy (1999), "The Power of Feelings: Personal Meaning in Psychoanalysis, Gender, and Culture," New Haven, CT: Yale University Press, ISBN 978-0300089097.
- Chodorow, Nancy (1994), "Femininities, Masculinities, Sexualities: Freud and Beyond," KY: University Press of Kentucky, ISBN 978-0813108285.
- Chodorow, Nancy (1991), "Feminism and Psychoanalytic Theory," New Haven, CT: Yale University Press, ISBN 978-0300051162.
- Chodorow, Nancy, (1978), "The Reproduction of Mothering: Psychoanalysis and the Sociology of Gender" CA: University of California Press, ISBN 9780520038929.
