= Jennifer Casolo =

American citizen

Jennifer Jean Casolo is an American citizen who was arrested on November 26, 1989 by Salvadoran government troops during the "Final Offensive" of the Farabundo Martí National Liberation Front (FMLN) in San Salvador.

== Arrest ==
Casolo's arrest was related to some arms allegedly discovered at her rented house. An American official noted at the time, "It's a good bust."

However, in a 1989 report on El Salvador, Human Rights Watch noted that the Casolo arrest came at a time when the Salvadoran police and army were arresting, jailing and expelling foreigners working with Salvadoran churches and relief organizations. These critics stated their belief that the government used the Casolo incident as part of an effort to threaten and discredit the entire foreign religious community in El Salvador. They also expressed their concern that it appeared to them that the U.S. Embassy staff in San Salvador and officials in Washington appeared to have already accepted the Salvadoran military's view that Casolo's guilt was an established fact. On November 27, 1989, White House spokesman Marlin Fitzwater stated that "there are indications of her involvement, that's for certain". Faced with criticism for what appeared to be a bias towards Casolo, Fitzwater apologized "to anyone who feels that they were offended by this."

=== Context ===
During this time period, many American and Europeans, often under the auspices of church organizations, were believed to be assisting the FMLN in what they believed was a liberation struggle against the Government of El Salvador. In another incident during the 1989 offensive, the International Committee of the Red Cross (ICRC) was contacted by the FMLN and told that another American woman could be located at a specific location who was suffering from battle injuries. The ICRC picked up the woman, whose jaw had been destroyed by a bullet, and transported her to a San Salvador hospital. The evidence suggested that she had been moving with an FMLN unit when it clashed with a Salvadoran military patrol.

=== Reactions ===
The Salvadoran government of Alfredo Cristiani was pressed by both the Salvadoran military and outraged citizens, who demanded prosecution of a foreigner contributing to the violence in their country. However, Casolo was also supported by a wide number of critics of the Salvadoran government, who demanded that she be released immediately. Former U.S. Attorney General Ramsey Clark flew in to represent Casolo, as did a number of religious leaders.

== Post-arrest ==
After days of pressure, President Cristiani ordered Casolo released for lack of evidence and deported on December 13, 1989. After spending the Christmas holiday with her family in the U.S. Casolo undertook a nationwide public speaking tour to tell about her experience helping refugees and as a prisoner in El Salvador. She was approached by a film maker to have her story made into a film, but declined when she learned that in the film version, she was supposed to fall in love with the guard who tortured her.

After her release, Casolo was asked to testify before a Congressional subcommittee on the conduct of U.S. Embassy officials in San Salvador during her detention.

She became a peace activist, later worked as a lay volunteer in a Catholic Parish in Honduras and in 2001 began a PhD program in Geography at the University of California at Berkeley. She now has her Masters and PhD from University of California at Berkeley and has published on issues such as gender and land rights in Honduras and historical memory and indigenous territorial struggles in Guatemala.

== Sources ==
- "Her Salvadoran ordeal over, Jennifer Casolo hits the road to end the war she left behind", People Weekly, vol 33 (January 22, 1990), pp. 64–65
- "The Evidence Against Casolo", W.W. Terry, The Oregonian, April 20, 1990, p. B5
- "U.S. Woman Tells of Salvadoran Ordeal" by Jason Parle, New York Times, January 8, 1990, Monday Late Edition - Final, Section A, p. 3
- "El Salvador's Cry: Tell The Truth", Accuracy In Media, March 8, 1990
- https://independent.academia.edu/JCasolo
- https://www.researchgate.net/profile/Jennifer_J_Casolo
