= John A. Pojman =

American chemist

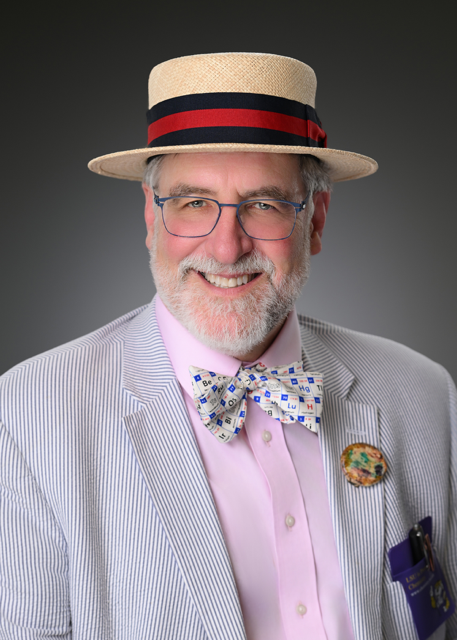
- Born: John Anthony Pojman; May 29, 1962; Cleveland, Ohio, U.S.
- Education: Georgetown University (BS); University of Texas at Austin (PhD); Brandeis University (Postdoctoral research)
- Known for: Invention of QuickCure Clay feral hog toxicant
- Scientific career
- Fields: materials science
- Workplaces: Louisiana State University; University of Southern Mississippi
- Website: pojman.com

John Anthony Pojman (born May 29, 1962) is an American chemist and professor. He is known for researching frontal polymerization, nonlinear chemical dynamics, and polymeric systems. He is the Patricia Senn and William Senn, Jr., Distinguished Professor and Chair of the Department of Chemistry at Louisiana State University (LSU) and the founder of Pojman Polymer Products, LLC. His work has applications in materials science, additive manufacturing, and microgravity polymer processing.

== Early life and education ==
Pojman was born in Cleveland, Ohio, and raised in North Royalton. He earned a B.S. in Chemistry with a minor in Classics from Georgetown University in 1984. He completed his doctorate in Chemical Physics at the University of Texas at Austin in 1988 under the supervision of Nobel laureate Ilya Prigogine and James Whitesell. Pojman conducted postdoctoral research at Brandeis University with Irving Epstein from 1988 to 1990.

== Career ==
Pojman began his academic career at the University of Southern Mississippi (USM) in 1990. He started his career as an assistant professor and was promoted to full professor by 1997. He joined LSU in 2008 as a professor and became chair of the Chemistry Department in 2020. His research focuses on nonlinear phenomena in polymers, including frontal polymerization—a self-propagating reaction process he pioneered for rapid material curing. This work led to developing commercial products such as QuickCure Clay and QuickCure Wood Filler, licensed through his company, Pojman Polymer Products, LLC.

He has collaborated with NASA on microgravity experiments, including studies aboard the KC-135 aircraft and contributions to projects on the International Space Station. He personally flew over 800 parabolas on NASA's KC-135 microgravity research plane. He also developed an experiment that flew on the Blue Origins suborbital rocket. Pojman has organized symposia on nonlinear dynamics and polymer science for the American Chemical Society (ACS) and Gordon Research Conferences.

He also co-curated an exhibit on “Polymers in Art through the centuries” at the Louisiana Art and Science Museum.

In 2023, he received the Charles E. Coates Memorial Award, Baton Rouge ACS/AIChE.

== Research ==
Pojman's research spans frontal polymerization, cure-on-demand systems, time-lapse polymerizations, chemo-hydrodynamic instabilities and the materials of art. His work on miscible fluid interactions in microgravity addressed long-standing questions in fluid dynamics. He has published over 185 peer-reviewed articles and co-authored An Introduction to Nonlinear Chemical Dynamics (Oxford University Press). His cure-on-demand polymer processing innovations, based on frontal polymerization, have been applied to arts and crafts materials.

Pojman's development of QuickCure Clay, a sculpting material that hardens rapidly via heat-activated frontal polymerization, has been used in artistic applications such as repairing ceramics and creating textured paintings. He is an inventor on 6 patents. Pojman is a co-inventor of a feral hog toxicant.

== Personal ==
Pojman lives in Baton Rouge, Louisiana with his wife, Dionne M. Rousseau.

== Awards ==
- 2023: Charles E. Coates Memorial Award.
- 2023:Southwest Regional ACS Award.
- 2025:Fellow of the American Association for the Advancement of Science.

== Selected publications ==
=== Books ===
- Epstein, Irving R.; Pojman, John A. (1998-11-19). An Introduction to Nonlinear Chemical Dynamics. Oxford University Press. doi:10.1093/oso/9780195096705.001.0001. ISBN 978-0-19-509670-5.
- Downey, James Patton; Pojman, John A., eds. (2001-08-14). Polymer Research in Microgravity. ACS Symposium Series. Vol. 793. Washington, DC: American Chemical Society. doi:10.1021/bk-2001-0793. ISBN 978-0-8412-3744-5.
- Pojman, John A.; Tran-Cong-Miyata, Qui, eds. (2003-11-18). Nonlinear Dynamics in Polymeric Systems. ACS Symposium Series. Vol. 869. Washington, DC: American Chemical Society. doi:10.1021/bk-2004-0869. ISBN 978-0-8412-3850-3.
- Pojman, John A.; Tran-Cong-Miyata, Qui, eds. (2010-10-27). Nonlinear Dynamics with Polymers. Wiley. doi:10.1002/9783527632602. ISBN 978-3-527-32529-0.

=== Book chapters ===
- Volpert, Vit. A.; Volpert, Vl. A.; Garbey, M.; Pojman, J. A. (1996), "Stability of Reaction Fronts", Springer Series in Chemical Physics, Berlin, Heidelberg: Springer Berlin Heidelberg, pp. 309–317, doi:10.1007/978-3-642-80299-7_24, ISBN 978-3-642-80301-7
- Pojman, John A.; Fortenberry, Dionne; Khan, Akhtar; Ilyashenko, Victor (1997-12-15), "Frontal Polymerization: Self-Propagating High-Temperature Synthesis of Polymeric Materials", ACS Symposium Series, Washington, DC: American Chemical Society, pp. 220–235, doi:10.1021/bk-1998-0681.ch019, ISBN 978-0-8412-3540-3
- Pojman, John A.; Popwell, Sammy; Fortenberry, Dionne I.; Volpert, Vitaly A.; Volpert, Vladimir A. (2003-11-18), "Nonlinear Dynamics in Frontal Polymerization", ACS Symposium Series, Washington, DC: American Chemical Society, pp. 106–120, doi:10.1021/bk-2004-0869.ch009, ISBN 978-0-8412-3850-3

=== Journals ===
- Pojman, John A.; Epstein, Irving R. (1990). "Convective effects on chemical waves. 1. Mechanisms and stability criteria". The Journal of Physical Chemistry. 94 (12): 4966–4972. doi:10.1021/j100375a039. ISSN 0022-3654.
- Pojman, John A. (1991). "Traveling fronts of methacrylic acid polymerization". Journal of the American Chemical Society. 113 (16): 6284–6286. Bibcode:1991JAChS.113.6284P. doi:10.1021/ja00016a063. ISSN 0002-7863.
- Pojman, John A.; Whitmore, Colin; Turco Liveri, Maria Liria; Lombardo, Renato; Marszalek, Jolanta; Parker, Rosie; Zoltowski, Brian (2006-02-16). "Evidence for the Existence of an Effective Interfacial Tension between Miscible Fluids: Isobutyric Acid−Water and 1-Butanol−Water in a Spinning-Drop Tensiometer". Langmuir. 22 (6): 2569–2577. doi:10.1021/la052111n. ISSN 0743-7463. PMID 16519456.
- Pojman, John A.; Bessonov, Nick; Volpert, Vitaly; Paley, Mark S. (2007). "Miscible Fluids in Microgravity (MFMG): A zero-upmass investigation on the International Space Station". Microgravity - Science and Technology. 19 (1): 33–41. Bibcode:2007MicST..19...33P. doi:10.1007/bf02870987. ISSN 0938-0108.
- Major, Shanice R.; Fontenot Jr., Clifford L.; Pojman Sr., John A.; Pojman Jr., John A.; Merchant, Mark E. (2011). "Serum complement activity in the three-toed amphiuma (Amphiuma tridactylum)". Comparative Immunology, Microbiology and Infectious Diseases. 34 (2): 115–121. doi:10.1016/j.cimid.2010.04.001. ISSN 0147-9571. PMID 20471679.
- Jee, Elizabeth; Bánsági, Tamás; Taylor, Annette F.; Pojman, John A. (2016-01-06). "Temporal Control of Gelation and Polymerization Fronts Driven by an Autocatalytic Enzyme Reaction". Angewandte Chemie. 128 (6): 2167–2171. Bibcode:2016AngCh.128.2167J. doi:10.1002/ange.201510604. ISSN 0044-8249. PMC 4950125. PMID 27478280.
