= Donna Arzt =

American legal scholar

Donna Arzt (December 9, 1954 – November 15, 2008) was an American legal scholar.

== Education ==
Arzt earned a B.A. degree at Brandeis University, a J.D. degree at Harvard Law School, and an LL.M. degree at Columbia Law School. From 1988 until her death she was Professor of Law in the Syracuse University College of Law, and Dean's Distinguished Research Scholar. She died November 15, 2008, after a long illness.

== Career ==
Before teaching at Syracuse, Arzt practiced public interest law in Boston and was an assistant attorney general for the Commonwealth of Massachusetts specializing in civil rights and regulation of charitable solicitation. Arzt published numerous articles on human rights in the Soviet Union and the Middle East. She served as a consultant to the Association for Civil Rights in Israel, Human Rights Watch, and the U.N. Special Rapporteur on population transfer.

Arzt was an activist in the movement to free Soviet Jewry. In 1977 she founded the Soviet Jewry Legal Advocacy Center (SJLAC) and added Larry Lerner as an officer. S:LAC later joined the Union of Councils for Soviet Jews. In that role, Arzt documented the USSR's violation of its own and international law. She also prepared many legal briefs on behalf of Refuseniks and Prisoners of Zion. These legal briefs were signed by US Senators and given to the Soviets via US Congressmen as well as to the families of the Refuseniks and POZ's, who often could not obtain legal representation.

She served as director of the Center for Global Law and Practice at the Syracuse University College of Law.

Arzt founded and directed the Lockerbie Trial Families Project, which informed the families of the 270 victims of the Pan Am Flight 103 bombing over Lockerbie, Scotland, about developments in the Lockerbie criminal trial as the trial took place in a Scottish courtroom in the Netherlands.

Arzt also founded and directed the Sierra Leone Project in which faculty and students at the College of Law assisted the Office of the Prosecutor of the Special Court for Sierra Leone, established by the United Nations and the country's government at the end of the decade-long Sierra Leone Civil War.

== Honors and awards ==
Arzt received the Michael J. Tryson Memorial Award for Excellence and Leadership in the field of human rights law.

== Books ==
- Refugees into Citizens: Palestinians and the End of the Arab-Israeli Conflict. New York: Council on Foreign Relations, 1997
