= Arthur G. Hunt =

American plant and soils scientist

- Occupation(s): Professor and Scientist
- Awards: Fellow of the American Association for the Advancement of Science (2017)

Arthur G. Hunt is an American plant and soils scientist who is currently a professor at the University of Kentucky and an elected fellow of the American Association for the Advancement of Science.

== Education ==
He earned his B.S at University of Lowell in 1976 and his Ph.D at Brandeis University in 1982.

== Research ==
His interests are mRNA 3' end formation and polyadenylation, and plant RNA processing. His highest cited paper is "Design and construction of a versatile system for the expression of foreign genes in plants" at 355 times, according to Google Scholar.

== Recent publications ==
- de Lorenzo, L., Sorenson, R, Bailey-Serres, J., and Hunt, A. G. (2017) Noncanonical alternative polyadenylation contributes to gene regulation in response to hypoxia. The Plant Cell 29, 1262-1277.
- Majee, M., Wu, S., Salaita, L., Gingerich, D., Dirk, L. M. A., Chappell J., Hunt, A. G., Vierstra, R., and Downie, A. B. (2017) The Genetic Structure in a misannotated locus positively influencing Arabidopsis Seed Germination is revealed using surrogate splicing. Plant Gene 10, 74-85.
- Chakrabarti, M., Dinkins, R. D., and Hunt, A. G. (2016) De novo transcriptome assembly and dynamic spatial gene expression analysis in red clover (Trifolium pratense). The Plant Genome 9, published online March 11, 2016. doi:10.3835/plantgenome2015.06.0048.
- Bell, S. A., Brown, A., Chen, S., and Hunt, A. G. (2016) Experimental genome-wide determination of RNA polyadenylation in Chlamydomonas reinhardtii. PLoS ONE 11: e0146107.
- Lim, G-H., Shine, M. B., de Lorenzo, L., Yu, K., Navarre, D., Hunt, A. G., Lee, J-y., Kachroo, A., and Kachroo, P. (2016). Plasmodesmata localizing proteins regulate transport and signaling during systemic immunity. Cell Host and Microbe 19, 541-549.

== Awards ==
Hunt was named Fellow of the American Association for the Advancement of Science for 2017 "in recognition of their contributions to science and technology, scientific leadership and extraordinary achievements across disciplines."
