= Stuart Altman =

American health economist (1938–2026)

Doctor Stuart H. Altman
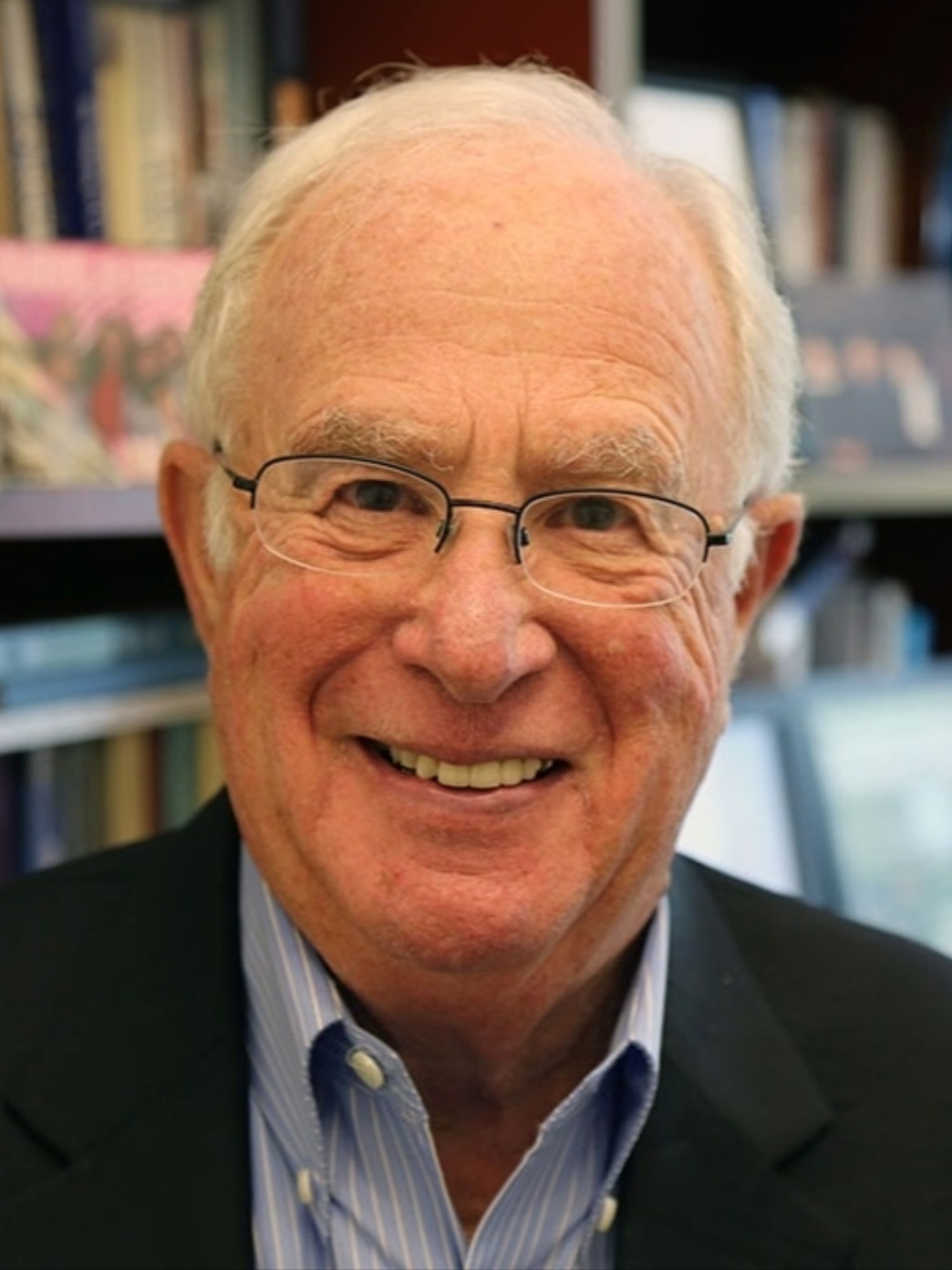
- Born: August 8, 1937; New York City, U.S.
- Died: January 1, 2026 (aged 88); North Carolina, U.S.
- Spouse: Diane Altman (née Kleinberg)

Academic background
- Education: CCNY, UCLA

Academic work
- Discipline: Healthcare economics
- Institutions: Brandeis University

Stuart Harold Altman (August 8, 1937 – January 1, 2026) was an American economist whose research interests were primarily in the area of federal and state health policy. He was the Sol C. Chaikin Professor of National Health Policy at Brandeis University, in the Heller School for Social Policy and Management. Altman is considered one of the most influential people in American healthcare. He served as interim president of Brandeis from 1990 to 1991.

== Career ==
Among his professional achievements, Altman served 12 years as chairman of the congressionally legislated Prospective Payment Assessment Commission (ProPac) formed to advise Congress and the administration on the functioning of the Medicare Diagnostic Related Group (DRG) Hospital Payment System and other system reforms. He was also chair of the Health Industry Forum which brings together diverse group leaders from across the health care field to develop solutions for critical problems facing the healthcare system.

Altman advised presidents Nixon, Clinton and Obama. From 1997 to 1999, he served on President Bill Clinton's National Bipartisan Commission on the Future of Medicare, a 14-member commission tasked with providing the president with recommendations to help Medicare remain tenable.

He was co-author of a book on the history of healthcare in the United States, Policies for an Aging Society. The book records information gathered from experts in public and health policy, economics, law, and management to identify the salient issues and explore realistic options. From positions ranging from liberal to conservative, the contributors take a wide view of the philosophical, economic, and programmatic aspects of the social protection programs for elderly Americans. They ask broad questions and propose integrated conceptions of how our society can best provide for the needs of its aging population. Altman co-authored another book with David Shactman titled Power, Politics, and Universal Health Care (2011), in which the history of healthcare in the United States during the 20th century and into the 21st is explained, ultimately putting Obama's healthcare plan into historical perspective.

In 2008, Altman was appointed to the board of directors for Inspiris, a privately held, for-profit health care management company. He has also served on the boards of Lincare Holdings and Aveta. Altman was also a director on the not-for-profit boards of EmblemHealth and Tufts-New England Medical Center in Boston.

In 2012, Altman was appointed by Massachusetts Gov. Deval Patrick to head the Massachusetts Health Policy Commission.

== Personal life and death ==
Altman died in North Carolina on January 1, 2026, at the age of 88. He was the older brother of Edward Altman and Ellen Altman-Stein.
