= Skiladiko =

Greek folk music genre; derogatory term

- Stylistic origins: Greek folk music; laiko; Byzantine music; pop; power pop; alternative rock
- Cultural origins: 1980s, Greece
- Typical instruments: Bouzouki; electric guitar; drums; violin

Skiladiko or skyladiko (Greek: σκυλάδικο, pronounced [sciˈlaðiko]) is a derogatory term to describe a branch of laiko music and some of the current nightclubs in Greece in which this music is performed. It also refers to the so-called "decadent" form of laiko, and is derived from the Greek for dog (σκύλος, skilos), meaning "doggish" or "doghouse". The term was also used to refer to cheap or often unlicensed Greek night clubs with a usually shady reputation of Greek music on the outskirts of a Greek city or town. The typical arrangement in current skiladika establishments includes an elevated stage ("palco") where singers and musicians perform Greek songs, with the use of heavily amplified bouzouki, electric guitars and other instruments.

== Related Greek artists ==
- Chryspa
- Lefteris Pantazis
- Giorgos Mazonakis
- Nancy Alexiadi
- Dionysis Makris
- Kelly Kelekidou
- Maro Litra
- Vasilis Karras
- Paola Foka
- Zafeiris Melas
- Anna Vissi
- Angela Dimitriou
- Antypas (singer)
- Themis Adamantidis

== See also ==
- Greek music
- Rebetiko
- Hasapiko
- Pop music
- Pop-folk
- Bouzouki
- Nightclubs in Greece
- Kalamatianos
- Greek dances
