= Star Academy (Greek TV series) =

- Genre: Talent show Reality
- Based on: Star Academy by Endemol
- Directed by: Periklis Asproulis (live); Thanasis Zois
- Presented by: Menios Fourthiotis; Martzi Lazarou (backstage); Sotiris Karamitzas (backstage)
- Judges: Anna Vissi; Katerina Gkagkaki; Petros Kostopoulos; Nikos Mouratides; Nikos Karvelas; Alexandros Rigas; Natalia Germanou
- Country of origin: Greece
- Original language: Greek
- No. of seasons: 1
- No. of episodes: 86 (daily); 16 (live)

Production
- Cinematography: Capo MK
- Running time: 30–60 minutes (daily); 4–5 hours (live)

Original release
- Network: E Channel
- Release: March 17 – July 15, 2017

Related
- Fame Story

Star Academy is a Greek reality TV show, and a licensed version of Endemol's Star Academy franchise. The series began on March 17, 2017 on the E Channel network and was completed on July 15, 2017. The judges were Anna Vissi (later replaced by Katerina Gkagkaki), Petros Kostopoulos, Nikos Mouratides, Nikos Karvelas (later replaced by Alexandros Rigas) and Natalia Germanou.

A day prior the show's premiere, a program called Star Academy Kick off Live aired, which took place in the academy, the house of the contestants, and was presented by Katerina Kainourgiou and Themis Malis. There, three boys would sing live and people would vote their favourite; the boy with the most votes, would be the 16th contestant of the show. The show was renamed from the fifth live episode to Super Star Academy, due to Epsilon TV owing money to Endemol, the worldwide franchise's production company, which therefore prohibited the station from airing the show under its brand name.

The headmistress of the academy was Katerina Gkagkaki and the teachers consisted of Aleksandros Rigas, Antonis Voerakos, Vasiliki Dimitropoulou, Vasilis Kostopoulos, Nikos Marianos and Polina Prelorentzou. The academy itself would operate inside a villa in Koropi (known as one of the filming sets for Mavra Mesanychta).

Xristina Xirokosta was the winner of the show. Her first song, Des Kathara, was released by Panik Records on YouTube, on February 28, 2018.

== Production ==
=== Scheduling ===
The live episodes would air Fridays at 20:45. From the show's rename and onwards, the weekly timeslot was moved to one day later. The daily episodes would be on air at first six and then five times a week at 21.00 and during them, the viewers could watch the contestants` life in the academy. During its original run, a program called Star Academy Magazine regarding the latest news about the show would air five times a week. The show would also broadcast on MegaOne in Cyprus. The last daily episode aired on March 12, 2017, and then the show was dropped out of the channel's programming, due to low ratings.

== Criticism ==
For the most part, the show would gather a lot of criticism. Audiences and online news editors criticized the show's host, Menios Fourthiotis, for his narcissistic behavior and use of language. His "fake" arguments with Nikos Karvelas, another judge notorious for his rude behaviour, were also criticized. Kosmas Vidos of To Vima referred to certain events in the show as "the epitome of coarseness." An event in which Christiana Mpounia, one of the contestants, was singing Marina Satti's Mantissa, only to realize after a while that she couldn't be heard singing, as the song was playing in playback, which has been widely regarded as one of the biggest blunders on Greek TV, as well as another one in which popular folk singer Aggeliki Iliadi was singing while the camera would partially show her buttocks, have been particularly noted by the press media and the audience. On an interview with Mouratides, he said that the show shouldn't have premiered this season, as that would make it enter a stiff competition with other talent shows at the time, and was also critical on the withdrawal of contestants who had "real talent." The show's reputation would worsen due to its relation with E Channel's telemarketing ads promoting products of questionable nature; Anna Vissi, said by some to be "the only saving graces" of the show, while partaking on the show, would appear in the said ads promoting an Aloe vera juice.

== Ratings ==
This was the least commercially successful version of the Endemol talent show in Greece, resulting in its short run and several crew members of the show either having their salaries severely cut, or being laid off. The premiere episode of the show was notably surpassed by an airing of Ratatouille on Alpha TV in ratings.

#	Episode	Date	Timeslot (EET)	Ratings	Viewers (in millions)	Rank		Share		Source
#	Episode	Date	Timeslot (EET)	Ratings	Viewers (in millions)	Daily	Weekly	Household	Adults 15-44	Source
0	Kick-Off Live	March 16, 2017	Thursday 9:00pm	—N/a				2.2%	—N/a	
1	Episode 1	March 17, 2017	Friday 8:45pm	—N/a				14.5%	14.3%	
2	Episode 2	March 24, 2017	Friday 8:45pm	—N/a				9.9%	8.7%	
3	Episode 3	March 31, 2017	Friday 8:45pm	—N/a				9.7%	10.1%	
4	Episode 4	April 7, 2017	Friday 8:45pm	—N/a				9.7%	8.4%	
5	Episode 5	April 22, 2017	Saturday 8:45pm	—N/a				10.8%	10.9%	
6	Episode 6	April 29, 2017	Saturday 8:45pm	3.5%	0.36	9	—N/a	11.2%	—N/a	
7	Episode 7	May 6, 2017	Saturday 8:45pm	—N/a				7.8%	6.7%	
8	Episode 37 (daily)	May 8, 2017	9:00 pm	—N/a				1.3%	0.6%	
9	Episode 38 (daily)	May 9, 2017	9:00 pm	—N/a				0.8%	0.2%	
10	Episode 39 (daily)	May 10, 2017	9:00 pm	—N/a				0.7%	0.4%	
11	Episode 40 (daily)	May 11, 2017	9:00 pm	—N/a				1%	0.7%	
12	Episode 8	May 20, 2017	Saturday 8:45pm	—N/a				8.0%	—N/a	
13	Episode 9	May 27, 2017	Saturday 8:45pm	—N/a				9.4%	9.1%	
14	Episode 10	June 3, 2017	Saturday 8:45pm	—N/a				8.4%	—N/a	
15	Episode 11	June 10, 2017	Saturday 8:45pm	—N/a				7.7%	—N/a	
16	Episode 13	June 24, 2017	Saturday 8:45pm	—N/a				8.6%	—N/a	
17	Episode 15	July 8, 2017	Saturday 8:45pm	—N/a				8.8%	4.9%	
18	Episode 16	July 15, 2017	Saturday 8:45pm	—N/a				12.2%	—N/a	
