= Fame Story =

- Old logo of the show
- Genre: Talent show Reality
- Based on: Star Academy by Endemol
- Presented by: Natalia Germanou; Andreas Mikroutsikos; Tatiana Stefanidou; Sophia Aliberti; Nikos Koklonis
- Judges: George Levendis; Evi Droutsa; Katerina Kouka; Antonis Vardis; Nikos Mouratides; Christos Dantis; Dafni Bokota; Stelios Rokkos; Elias Benetos; Natalia Germanou; Takis Kouvatseas; Iasonas Triantafillides; Sophie Papa; Kaiti Garbi; Giorgos Moukides; Panos Metaxopoulos; Antonis Remos; Eleni Foureira; Giorgos Arsenakos; Light
- Country of origin: Greece
- Original language: Greek
- No. of seasons: 6 (1 upcoming)

Production
- Production location: Attica
- Production company: Endemol

Original release
- Network: ANT1
- Release: 30 September 2002 – 28 June 2006
- Network: Star; Omega
- Release: 30 September 2023 – December 2023
- Network: Epsilon tv (now known as) Open TV
- Release: 17 March – 15 July 2017

Related
- Star Academy (Greece)

Fame Story is a Greek reality television show that was a licensed version of Endemol's Star Academy, originally broadcast on the ANT1 network. It has been one of the most successful Greek television shows and is credited for having helped foster the careers of some of the show's contestants, which have gone on to produce chart topping hits in the Greek market.

The contestants gave a weekly performance in a 2½–3 hour episode in which the contestants were judged and where one contestant was voted off after a week-long televote. On the other 6 days of the week, the best footage of the day was compiled in a late night episode from inside the academy's studios and from the adjacent house where the contestants lived for their entire stay on the show inclusively. The show's seasons ran for 3½ months, except for season three which ran for 6½ months.

The show is one of few Star Academy franchises, along with the UK's Fame Academy, to feature the song "Fame", originally performed by Irene Cara in the 1980 film of the same name. However ANT1 later commissioned songwriter Phoebus to write the original song titled "You Can Be a Star", and the Cara song was used in television spots and montages instead.

ANT1 premiered The X Factor in its Fall 2008 lineup, thus switching to competitor FremantleMedia's The X Factor franchise.

Ιn March 17, 2017, a spin-off show titled Star Academy premiered on E Channel. The judges were Anna Vissi, Nikos Mouratides, Petros Kostopoulos and Natalia Germanou, and the host was Menios Fourthiotis. This was the least commercially successful season and a critical failure, receiving negative reviews and an audience share of just 1%.

TV presenter and producer Nikos Koklonis announced that the show would come back in September 2023 on Star and CyBC. The winner of the fifth season will earn a €50,000 prize, will be signed to the label Panik Records, and was originally intended to be chosen to represent Cyprus at the 68th edition of the Eurovision Song Contest. Placed under review after Greek national broadcaster ERT raised objections to Star having the right to air the event in Greece, the EBU reportedly expanded the official rules regarding the organization and production of national selections, effectively barring the use of the format as a national final. This was ultimately confirmed by Star. The show was then moved from CyBC to Omega TV, similarly to other Star programs broadcast in Cyprus. It began airing on 30 September 2023. The four new judges are Antonis Remos, Eleni Foureira, Giorgos Arsenakos and Light.

== Series overview ==
=== As Fame Story ===
Season	First aired	Last aired	Network	Top 3		
Season	First aired	Last aired	Network	Winner	Runner-up	Third place
1	30 September 2002	31 December 2002	ANT1	Notis Christodoulou	Gregoris Petrakos	Thanos Petrelis
2	14 March 2004	28 June 2004	ANT1	Kalomoira	Rallia Christidou	Kostas Karafotis
3	10 October 2004	3 April 2005	ANT1	Pericles Stergianoudes	Giorgos Lianos	Andreas Kostantinidis
4	19 February 2006	28 June 2006	ANT1	Leonidas Balafas	Vasiliki Kapakou	Mikaella Hatziefrem
5	30 September 2023	22 December 2023	Star; Omega	Anna Poltzoglou	Aristea Alexandraki	Titos Lachanas

=== As Star Academy ===
Season	First aired	Last aired	Network	Top 3		
Season	First aired	Last aired	Network	Winner	Runner-up	Third place
1	17 March 2017	15 July 2017	E Channel	Xristina Xirokosta	Elena Koroneou	Stylianos Xanthos

== Cast ==
=== Hosts ===
Color key:

– Hosts
– Hosts (Replacement)

Host	Season				
Host	1	2	3	4	5
Natalia Germanou					
Andreas Mikroutsikos					
Tatiana Stefanidou					
Sophia Aliberti					
Nikos Koklonis					

=== Judges ===
Color key:

– Judges
– Judges (Replacement)

Judge	Season				
Judge	1	2	3	4	5
George Levendis					
Evi Droutsa					
Katerina Kouka					
Antonis Vardis					
Nikos Mouratides					
Christos Dantis					
Dafni Bokota					
Stelios Rokkos					
Elias Benetos					
Natalia Germanou					
Takis Kouvatseas					
Iasonas Triantafillides					
Sophie Papa					
Kaiti Garbi					
Giorgos Moukides					
Panos Metaxopoulos					
Antonis Remos					
Eleni Foureira					
Giorgos Arsenakos					
Light					

== Contestants ==
=== Series 1 ===
Contestant	Elimination	Place
Notis Christodoulou	Live Concert Final	1
Gregoris Petrakos	Live Concert Final	2
Thanos Petrelis	Live Concert Final	3
Eleana Papaioannou	Live Concert Final	4
Foteini Tsitsigkou	Live Concert Final	5
Sokratis Tsiourvas	Live Concert 13	6
Lilian Madianou ^{2}	Live Concert 12	7
Dimitris Liolios ^{2}	Live Concert 11	8
Aspa Tsina	Live Concert 11	9 (quit)
Diana Tsekou ^{1}	Live Concert 10	10
Ioanna Kolokotroni	Live Concert 9	11
Nino Xypolitas	Live Concert 8	12
Haris Papadopoulos	Live Concert 7	13
Lina Mavromati	Live Concert 6	14
Maria Christodoulou	Live Concert 5	15
Ioanna Katrakou	Live Concert 4	16
Athena Alatsari	Live Concert 3	17
Tasos Fotiadis	Live Concert 3	18 (quit)
Athina Petridou	Live Concert 2	19

1. Since Live Concert 7
2. Since Live Concert 8

=== Series 2 ===
Contestant	Elimination	Place
Kalomoira	Live Concert Final	1
Rallia Christidou	Live Concert Final	2
Kostas Karafotis	Live Concert Final	3
Giorgos Christou	Live Concert Final	4
Konstantinos Thalassohoris	Live Concert Final	5
Athena Velisari ^{2#}	Live Concert Final	6
Maro Litra	Live Concert 15	7
Nikos Michas	Live Concert 14	8
Natasa Zenetzi ^{2#}	Live Concert 13	9
Ioanna Koutalidou	Live Concert 12	10
Sabina Lois	Live Concert 11	11
Giannis Lampropoulos ^{1#}	Live Concert 10	12
Apostolia Gouti	Live Concert 9	13 (quit)
Fragiskos Chios ^{1#}	Live Concert 8	14
Kostas Kountos	Live Concert 7	15
Eua Moscholiou	Live Concert 6	16 (quit)
Klara Miroforidou	Live Concert 5	17
Vaggelis Tsarouchas	Live Concert 4	18
Kostas Moltsidis	Live Concert 3	19
Sofia Gkolemi	Live Concert 2	20
Giorgos Antonogiannakis	Live Concert 1	21 - 24
Christos Touventsidis	Live Concert 1	21 - 24
Michalis Araitzoglou	Live Concert 1	21 - 24
Alexandra Berberi	Live Concert 1	21 - 24

1. Since Live Concert 6
2. Since Live Concert 7

=== Series 3 ===
Contestant	Elimination	Place
Pericles Stergianoudes ^{1*}	Live Concert Final	1
Giorgos Lianos	Live Concert Final	2
Andreas Kostantinidis	Live Concert Final	3
Vaggelis Proimos	Live Concert Final	4
Chrisanthi Michalopoulou	Live Concert Final	5
Anastasia Zanni ^{2*}	Live Concert 23	6
Nancy Alexiadi	Live Concert 22	7
Agamemnon Porfirogennitos ^{3*}	Live Concert 21	8
Afroditi Vlasserou ^{3*}	Live Concert 20	9
Domna Koundouri ^{1*}	Live Concert 20	10 (quit)
Elena Palaga ^{3*}	Live Concert 19	11
Margarita Mpezaiti ^{2*}	Live Concert 18	12
Katerina Mpourneli	Live Concert 17	13
Panagiotis Psaltis ^{2*}	Live Concert 16	14
Giorgos Pandis ^{2*}	Live Concert 15	15
Zoi Georgiou	Live Concert 14	16
Antigoni Eustratoglou	Live Concert 13	17
Giannis Nikolaou	Live Concert 12	18
Petros Pilarinos ^{1*}	Live Concert 11	19
Annet Artani ^{1*}	Live Concert 11	20 (quit)
Alexandra Kousi	Live Concert 10	21
Konstantinos Argyros	Live Concert 9	22
Silvia Delikoura	Live Concert 8	23
Stavros Makridis	Live Concert 7	24
Michalis Deredinis	Live Concert 6	25
Giannis Vardas	Live Concert 5	26
Despina Stivaktaki	Live Concert 4	27
Tzeni Apostolidou	Live Concert 3	28
TBA	Live Concert 2	29
Sakis	Live Concert 1	30 - 31
Nancy Tzoulaki	Live Concert 1	30 - 31

1. Since Live Concert 6
2. Since Live Concert 13
3. Since Live Concert 17

=== Series 4 ===
Contestant	Elimination	Place
Leonidas Balafas	Live Concert Final	1
Vasiliki Kapakou	Live Concert Final	2
Mikaella Hatziefrem	Live Concert Final	3
Christina Koletsa	Live Concert Final	4
Stathis Raftopoulos	Live Concert Final	5
Maria Iakovou	Live Concert Final	6
Marianna Gerasimidou	Live Concert Final	7
Marios Sideromenos		8
Onur Turan		9
Fide Koksal		10
Vasilis Lampropoulos		11
Elena		12
Odusseas Rouskas		13
Lazaros Kapsimalis		14
Tasos Mikroulis		15
Dionisis Xiotis		16
Giannis Apostolidis		17
Eirini Daniil		18
Elsa Pazi		19
Sofia Kilia		20
Giorgos Lexis		21
Eleni Hatzidou	Live Concert 1	22

=== Series 5 ===
16 contestants were selected for the fifth season, with one elimination in each weekly show.

Contestant	Elimination	Place
Anna Poltzoglou	Final Live Concert 13	1
Aristea Alexandraki	Final Live Concert 13	2
Titos Lachanas	Final Live Concert 13	3
Feidias Irodotou	Final Live Concert 13	4
Sotiris Giazitzioglou	Live Concert 12	5 - 6
Giannis Stefanidis	Live Concert 12	5 - 6
Dimitris Kleidas	Live Concert 11	7 - 8
Dani and Viktor	Live Concert 11	7 - 8
Andrew Punch	Live Concert 10	9 - 10
Eleana Athanasiou Rielle ^{1'}	Live Concert 10	9 - 10
Megan Alcantara	Live Concert 9	11
Mairi Tsavalia	Live Concert 8	12
Marios Matianos ^{1'}	Live Concert 7	13
Stratos Tzortzis	Live Concert 6	14
Nicky Glossom	Live Concert 5	15
Christina Zioga	Live Concert 4	16
Dimitris Sofis	Live Concert 3	17
Savvina Vouldouki	Live Concert 2	18
Dimitra Preka	Live Concert 1	19 - 20
Emmanouil Leandros Karaiskakis	Live Concert 1	19 - 20

1. Since Live Concert 5
