= Maro Litra =

Greek singer

- Born: Maria Litra; 3 November 1970 (age 55); Montreal, Quebec, Canada
- Origin: Lefkada, Missolonghi Greece
- Genres: Laïko; pop; pop rock; dance-pop; eurodance
- Occupation: Singer
- Instrument: Vocals
- Years active: 2000–present
- Labels: Heaven Music; Sony Music Entertainment; Cobalt Music
- Website: marolitra.net

Maro Litra (Greek: Μάρω Λύτρα), born as Maria Litra (Μαρία Λύτρα} on 3 November 1970 in Montreal, Quebec), is a Greek singer. She studied music at McGill University Conservatory of Music.

== Biography ==
She was born in Montreal, Canada on 3 November 1970 by Greek parents from Lefkada and Missolonghi, Greece. She studied music at McGill University Conservatory of Music. For many years she worked as singer in Montreal's nightclubs and restaurants. She began her career after she was competing in the second edition of the Greek talent show Fame Story. She has released 2 albums, several singles and she has won 2 awards in MAD Video Music Awards.She has collaborated with some important artists in Greece: Nikos Vertis, Stamatis Gonidis, Natasa Theodoridou, Peggy Zina, Notis Sfakianakis, Vasilis Karras, Antypas, Giorgos Tsalikis, Nikos Makropoulos, Nikos Oikonomopoulos, Julie Massino, Kostas Karafotis, Dakis.

== Career ==
=== 2000–2001: Early years ===
In 2000 she met the Greek singer Giorgos Alkaios, who offered her to work with him at a nightclub in Greece. On 24 April 2001 she released her first CD-Single Kiss My Remix by Kewl Records, which includes six covers of Greek hits: «Akros Tolmiro» (Despina Vandi), «Sto Dromo Ola Petamena» (Evridiki), «To Allo Miso» (Despina Vandi), «Pes Mou Ti Sou Efteksa» (Natasa Theodoridou), «Spania» (Despina Vandi) and «Simadi Sto Lemo» (Evridiki).

=== 2004: Fame Story and Collaboration with Julie Massino ===
In 2004 she was competing in the second edition of the Greek talent show Fame Story and she managed to reach the semi-finals. When she left the talent show, she participated in Julie Massino's album «I'm in Love» with a duet called «Oso Girizi I Gi» which was certified gold.

=== 2005–2006: Mikres Amarties ===
In 2005, Maro Litra signs a contract with Heaven Music and released her first album Mikres Amarties (Small Sins). The album was distinguished by the first single "Iparhi Alli" as long as by the songs "Thymisou", "File" and her duet "Thelo Na Sou Po" (I Want To Tell You) with Kostas Karafotis which included in the reissue of her album. Two songs "Ma Den Boro Na Se Ksehaso" and "Mi Me Kitas" were written by Natalia Germanou. In the spring of 2005, Litra started performing at club «Posidonio» with Nikos Vertis. For the winter season of 2005–2006, she started her second round of performances at club «Posidonio». At the Mad Video Music Awards she was nominated as «best debut artist» with her song Iparhi Alli and she performed live with Constantinos Christoforou a mashup of the hits "Crazy In Love / Ain't Nobody". On 14 June 2006 Maro Litra appeared on MAD Video Music Awards and performed the song "Baila Morena" with Christos Dantis. For the winter season 2006–2007 she performed at «Votanikos» with Stamatis Gonidis, Natasa Theodoridou and Giorgos Lianos.

=== 2007: I Mihani Tou Hronou (Phoebus era) ===
In 2007, Maro Litra collaborated with the popular songwriter Phoebus. He wrote 4 songs of Litra's next album, I Mihani Tou Hronou (The Time Machine) which includes 11 new tracks. The album was distinguished by the first single "I Mihani Tou Hronou" as long as by the songs "Metaniosa", "Gyrizo", "Ola Ki Ola" written by Phoebus, "Ke Ti Katalaveno" and "Gyalia Spasmena". The duet "Ine Trela" with Giorgos Lianos were written by Stamatis Gonidis for their performances at «Votanikos». She performed the track "Summer Wine" with Kostas Martakis on 25 June 2007 at the MAD Video Music Awards, where she won the category "Sexy Video Clip" with the music video "I Mihani Tou Hronou". For the summer season she performed at «Thea» with Nikos Makropoulos and Nikos Oikonomopoulos. For the winter season 2007–2008 she performed at «FIX», Thessaloniki with Giorgos Tsalikis and Goin' Through.

=== 2008–2009: Taxidiotes Psihis and Elpizo Pia Se Mena ===
In 2008, she collaborated with the band Taxidiotes Psihis for the duet "De Theli Logo I Kardia N' Agapa", written by Pantelis Makris. In March 2009 she released her new digital single with Heaven Music Kaneis Lathos (feat. TNS), written by Konstantinos Pantzis. It was the first single of her upcoming album Elpizo Pia Se Mena, but the release was canceled. Some years later, the self titled "Elpizo Pia Se Mena" was leaked on YouTube. On 24 June 2009 she performed live at the MAD Video Music Awards the song "It's Not Right (Tha Kano To Sosto)" and she won the category "Best Duet/Featuring" with "Kaneis Lathos". In the autumn of 2009, Litra started performing at club «FIX», Thessaloniki with Vasilis Karras & Dionysis Makris.

=== 2010: Collaboration with Toni Cottura and move to "Sony Music" ===
In 2010, Litra signs a contract with Sony Music Entertainment and the producer Toni Cottura asks her to collaborate on some new songs. Their first single "Elevator Love" was released in two versions (English & Greek) by Sony Music Entertainment. At the Mad Video Music Awards she was nominated as «Sexy Video Clip» with the Elevator Love. Her second single with Cottura "Unut Onu / Miss You Like Crazy" was a duet with the Turkish singer İsmi Sina. On 7 May 2010 she released a new cover of the classical song of Vicky Leandros "To Mistiko Sou" (Something's Got a Hold of My Heart). In November 2010 she released a new digital single with Cobalt Music "Ora Na Pigaineis" written by Konstantinos Pantzis & Posidonas Giannopoulos. For the winter season 2010–2011 she performed at «EDO Athens Club Restaurant» with Christos Kiprianidis & Giorgos Christou.

=== 2011: Collaboration with Notis Sfakianakis and Return to Canada ===
In 2011 she released her new digital single "Ise Oti Agapao" written by Andreas Lambrou. On 29 April 2011 Litra collaborated with Notis Sfakianakis at «Pili Aksiou» in Thessaloniki. For the summer season she was on tour with rapper BO. In September 2011 she decided to move back to Canada, because of Greece's economic crisis.

=== 2016: Ti Den Katalavenis and Makria Kai Agapimeni ===
In May 2016, Litra decided to make a "comeback" with two new songs written by Stavros Zacharias and Nikos Tassiopoulos, and released from Smile Records. The first digital single "Ti Den Katalavenis" released on 19 May 2016. The second single "Makria Ke Agapimeni" released on 18 July 2016. After a year, she released a new summer remix of her single "Makria Ke Agapimeni", on 17 May 2017.

=== 2020: Soon and Gone ===
In 2020, Litra collaborated with the band "The Far Removed" (Tony Marcello & Dionyssios Roussianos) and she released a new digital single called "Soon". In November 2020 she released by Real Music her new pop dance single "Gone" written by "The Far Removed".

=== 2021: Greece ===
In 2021 she signs a contract with Heaven Music / 314 Records and she released her new single and music video "Greece" written by "The Far Removed".
