= Dancing with the Stars (Greek TV series) season 6 =

Season of television series

Dancing with the Stars
- Season 6
- Celebrity winner: Vangelis Kakouriotis
- Professional winner: Nikoletta Mavridi
- No. of episodes: 14

Release
- Original network: ANT1
- Original release: 26 January – 4 May 2018

Season chronology
- ← Previous; Season 5

The sixth season of Dancing with the Stars premiered on 26 January 2018, airing on ANT1. The show is based on the United Kingdom BBC Television series Strictly Come Dancing and is part of BBC Worldwide's Dancing with the Stars franchise. The theme song is "It's personal" performed by Swedish indie pop band The Radio Dept.

The co-hosts for season six are season 4’s Evangelia Aravani and former season one host, Savvas Poumpouras. Alexis Kostalas and Galena Velikova were joined by Giorgos Liagas and former season 2 contestant, Eleonora Meleti on the judging panel

It was revealed that season six would have 16 contestants, the biggest number of participants so far. The professional partners were revealed on 17 January 2018. During week six, Olga Piliaki made her debut as a contestant and in week seven Maggie Charalampidou joined the competition.

In week 10, Meleti had her last appearance as a judge of the show, leaving the show due to her pregnancy.

In week 11, there was a change in the rules. The two couples with the lowest combined score from judges and viewers will get to dance again. Once they have danced the judges will vote for the couple they want to stay.

In week 12 and 13, the two couples with the lowest scores would be eliminated. The first couple would be the one on the bottom of the leader board and the second couple would be the one who lost the dance off.

In week 14, Kakouriotis and Mavridi were declared the winner. Valavani and Manogiannakis came in second place, with Olga & Giorgos came in third place third place.

== Judges ==
- Alexis Kostalas, announcer, sports commentator.
- Galena Velikova, choreographer, dancer, dance teacher. Former judge on season 1,3 and 4 of the Bulgarian version of the show.
- Eleonora Meleti, TV hostess. Former season 2 contestant.
- Giorgos Liagas, TV host. Former season 4 guest judge.

== Guest judges ==
- Natalia Germanou – Week 6
- Vicky Hadjivassiliou – Week 7
- Maria Solomou – Week 8
- Tatiana Stefanidou – Week 9
- Katerina Gagaki – Week 10
- Nadia Boule – Week 11
- Ntoretta Papadimitriou – Week 12
- Isaias Matiamba – Week 13
- Charis Christopoulos – Week 14

== Couples ==
Celebrity	Occupation	Professional partner	Status
Dionysis Alertas	Pastry chef	Fotini Papastavrou	Eliminated 1st on 2 February 2018
Alberto Eskenazi	Actor	Anna Polyzou	Withdrew on 9 February 2018
Maria Kalavria	Fashion model	Anastasis Kanaridis	Eliminated 2nd on 9 February 2018
Vicky Kavoura	Actress	Giorgos Ketseridis	Eliminated 3rd on 16 February 2018
Christina Lampiri	TV hostess	Alexandros Papadopoulos	Eliminated 4th on 23 February 2018
Dorothea Merkouri	Actress	Vladimir Morotsko	Eliminated 5th on 2 March 2018
Antonis Vlontakis	Water polo player	Elina Pini	Withdrew on 9 March 2018
Pinelopi Anastasopoulou	Actress	Elias Ladas	Eliminated 6th on 9 March 2018
Maggie Charalampidou ^{2}	Music Producer	Alexandros Papadopoulos	Eliminated 7th on 16 March 2018
Annie Pantazi	Olympic gymnast	Richard Szilagyi	Eliminated 8th on 23 March 2018
Maria Korinthiou	Actress	Elias Boutsis	Eliminated 9th on 13 April 2018
Michalis Seitis	Paralympic athlete	Claudia-Anna Stoyia	Eliminated 10th on 20 April 2018
Anthimos Ananiadis	Actor	Tzeni Nikolentzou	Eliminated 11th on 20 April 2018
Kostas Tsouros	Journalist	Maria Tsitou	Eliminated 12th on 27 April 2018
Myriella Kourenti	Actress	Tasos Roussos	Eliminated 13th on 27 April 2018
Olga Piliaki ^{1}	Olympic gymnast	Giorgos Ketseridis	Third Place on 4 May 2018
Evridiki Valavani	Sports journalist	Paulos Manogiannakis	Runner up on 4 May 2018
Vangelis Kakouriotis	Singer	Nikoletta Mavridi	Winner on 4 May 2018

1. Since week 6
2. Since week 7

== Scoring chart ==
Couple	Place	1	2	1+2	3	4	5	6	7	8	9	10	11	10+11	12	13	14
Vangelis & Nikoletta	1	25	24	49	30	30	33	43	40	43	45+41=86	43+4=47	33	80	38+2=40	38+40=78	36+39+40=115
Evridiki & Pavlos	2	22	21	43	28	27	26	34	38	44	42+45=87	45	36	81	39	35+40=75	36+38+40=114
Olga & Giorgos	3							44	47	49	47+50=97	46	36+4=40	86	40	36+40=76	39+40=79
Myriella & Tasos	4	21	24	45	27	28	31	40	42	38	43+50=93	45	39	84	40	36+40=76	
Kostas & Maria	5	19	24	43	19	30	28	42	40	47	35+50=85	38	36	74	37+2=39	36+36=72	
Anthimos & Tzeni	6	16	20	36	21	26	27	35	40	43	35+45=80	39	34	73	35+2=37		
Michalis & Claudia-Anna	7	22	25	47	23	29	30	34	43	43	37+41=78	35	37	72	37+2=39		
Maria & Elias	8	23	25	48	24	27	29	40	38	43	38+41=79	43+4=47	31	78			
Annie & Richard	9	27	28	55	27	30	35	39	51	45	47+45=92						
Maggie & Alexandros	10								30	32							
Pinelopi & Elias	11	21	28	49	32	31	33	43	37								
Antonis & Elina	12	16	18	34	23	24	25	32	–								
Dorothea & Vladimir	13	23	18	41	23	23	30	34									
Christina & Alexandros	14	20	23	43	23	–	24										
Vicky & Giorgos	15	16	21	37	24	23											
Maria & Anastasis	16	21	26	47	23												
Alberto & Anna	17	20	19	39	–												
Dionysis & Fotini	18	12	16	28													

Red numbers indicate the lowest score for each week
Green numbers indicate the highest score for each week
the couple got the lowest score of the night and was eliminated that week
the couple eliminated that week
the returning couple finishing in the bottom two
this couple withdrew from the competition
the winning couple
the runner-up couple
the third-place couple
the couple didn't dance this week
the couple won immunity from the previous live

== Weekly scores ==
Individual judges scores in the charts below (given in parentheses) are listed in this order from left to right: Alexis Kostalas, Galena Velikova, Eleonora Meleti and Giorgos Liagas.

=== Week 1 ===
Running order

Couple	Score	Dance	Music
Pinelopi & Elias	21 (6, 5, 5, 5)	Samba	"Mi Gente"- J Balvin & Willy William
Anthimos & Tzeni	16 (4, 4, 4, 4)	Salsa	"Échame la Culpa"- Luis Fonsi & Demi Lovato
Christina & Alexandros	20 (5, 5, 5, 5)	Foxtrot	"City of Stars"- Ryan Gosling & Emma Stone
Evridiki & Pavlos	22 (5, 6, 5, 6)	Contemporary	"Dusk Till Dawn"- Zayn & Sia
Alberto & Anna	20 (6, 5, 5, 4)	Quickstep	"Despacito"- Luis Fonsi & Daddy Yankee
Myriella & Tasos	21 (5, 5, 5, 6)	Cha-Cha-Cha	"Katchi"- Nick Waterhouse
Vangelis & Nikoletta	25 (6, 6, 6, 7)	Hip-Hop	"Tip Toe"- Jason Derulo & French Montana
Michalis & Claudia-Anna	22 (6, 6, 5, 5)	Paso Doble	"Save Tonight"- Eagle-Eye Cherry
Vicky & Giorgos	16 (4, 4, 4, 4)	Cha-Cha-Cha	"Havana"- Camila Cabello & Young Thug
Dorothea & Vladimir	23 (6, 5, 6, 6)	Viennese Waltz	"Perfect"- Ed Sheeran
Antonis & Elina	16 (4, 4, 4, 4)	Waltz	"Earned It"- The Weeknd
Annie & Richard	27 (7, 6, 7, 7)	Jive	"Dear Future Husband"-Meghan Trainor
Kostas & Maria	19 (5, 5, 5, 4)	Argentine Tango	"Querer"- Francesca Gagnon
Maria & Anastasis	21 (5, 6, 5, 5)	Samba	"Trumpets"- Sak Noel & Salvi & Sean Paul
Dionysis & Fotini	12 (3, 3, 3, 3)	Bachata	"Mami no me hagas esto"- Xtreme
Maria & Elias	23 (6, 6, 5, 6)	Rumba	"Lost on You"- LP

=== Week 2 ===
Running order

Couple	Score	Dance	Music	Result
Dorothea & Vladimir	18 (4, 4, 5, 5)	Cha-Cha-Cha	"Cake by the Ocean"- DNCE	Safe
Antonis & Elina	18 (4, 5, 4, 5)	Paso Doble	"Believer"- Imagine Dragons	Safe
Evridiki & Pavlos	21 (5, 5, 5, 6)	Samba	"Instruction"- Jax Jones & Demi Lovato & Stefflon Don	Safe
Michalis & Claudia-Anna	25 (6, 7, 6, 6)	Contemporary	"River"- Bishop Briggs	Safe
Vicky & Giorgos	21 (5, 6, 5, 5)	Hip-Hop	"Swalla"- Jason Derulo & Nicki Minaj & Ty Dolla Sign	Safe
Pinelopi & Elias	28 (7, 7, 7, 7)	Quickstep	"Polles fores"- Les au revoir	Safe
Christina & Alexandros	23 (6, 5, 6, 6)	Rumba	"Thinking Out Loud"- Ed Sheeran	Bottom two
Anthimos & Tzeni	20 (5, 5, 5, 5)	Foxtrot	"Swing Supreme"- Robbie Williams	Safe
Myriella & Tasos	24 (6, 6, 6, 6)	Jive	"To miden"- Onirama	Safe
Dionysis & Fotini	16 (4, 4, 4, 4)	Viennese Waltz	"Vampire Waltz"- Peter Gundry	Eliminated
Alberto & Anna	19 (5, 4, 5, 5)	Cha-Cha-Cha	"Diplos Glikos Kaimos"- Tzeni Vanou & Giannis Vogiatzis	Safe
Vangelis & Nikoletta	24 (6, 6, 6, 6)	Salsa	"Reggaetón Lento (Bailemos)"- CNCO	Safe
Maria & Anastasis	24 (6, 6, 6, 6)	Viennese Waltz	"Love on the Brain" – Rihanna	Safe
Maria & Elias	25 (6, 6, 7, 6)	Tango	"Addicted to You"- Avicii	Safe
Kostas & Maria	24 (6, 6, 6, 6)	Bachata	"Deja Vu"- Prince Royce & Shakira	Safe
Annie & Richard	28 (7, 7, 7, 7)	Contemporary	"Sign of the Times"- Harry Styles	Safe

=== Week 3 ===
Running order

Couple	Score	Dance	Music	Result
Annie & Richard	27 (7, 7, 7, 6)	Samba	"No Lie"- Sean Paul & Dua Lipa	Safe
Michalis & Claudia-Anna	23 (6, 5, 7, 5)	Viennese Waltz	"It's a Man's Man's Man's World"- James Brown	Safe
Vangelis & Nikoletta	30 (7, 8, 7, 8)	Jive	"Greased Lightnin'"- John Travolta	Safe
Myriella & Tasos	27 (6, 7, 7, 7)	Contemporary	"An me Deis na Klaio"- Elena Paparizou & Anastasios Rammos	Safe
Maria & Anastasis	23 (6, 6, 6, 5)	Cha-Cha-Cha	"Sax"- Fleur East	Eliminated
Kostas & Maria	19 (5, 5, 5, 4)	Paso Doble	"Torn"- Nathan Lanier	Safe
Christina & Alexandros	23 (6, 6, 6, 5)	Quickstep	"Je Suis Grecque (Ime Romia)"- Melina Mercouri	Safe
Evridiki & Pavlos	28 (7, 6, 7, 8)	Viennese Waltz	"You Don't Own Me"- Grace & G-Eazy	Safe
Anthimos & Tzeni	21 (6, 5, 5, 5)	Cha-Cha-Cha	"Smooth"- Santana	Safe
Dorothea & Vladimir	23 (7, 6, 5, 5)	Rumba	"Fila me"- Stamatis Kraounakis	Safe
Pinelopi & Elias	32 (8, 8, 8, 8)	Hip-Hop	"Get Ugly"- Jason Derulo	Safe
Maria & Elias	24 (6, 6, 7, 5)	Foxtrot	"I Kissed a Girl"- Katy Perry	Bottom two
Antonis & Elina	23 (6, 6, 6, 5)	Argentine Tango	"Mi confesion"- Gotan Project	Safe
Vicky & Giorgos	24 (6, 6, 6, 6)	Salsa	"Cuba 2012"- Latin Formation	Safe

=== Week 4: Cinema night ===
Running order

Couple	Score	Dance	Music	Film	Result
Vangelis & Nikoletta	30 (7, 7, 8, 8)	Viennese Waltz	"A Thousand Years" – Christina Perri	Twilight	Safe
Evridiki & Pavlos	27 (7, 7, 7, 6)	Hip-Hop	"Lose Yourself" – Eminem	8 Mile	Safe
Antonis & Elina	24 (6, 6, 6, 6)	Rumba	"Writing's on the Wall" – Sam Smith	Spectre	Safe
Annie & Richard	30 (8, 7, 8, 7)	Bollywwood	"Jai Ho! (You Are My Destiny)" – A. R. Rahman & The Pussycat Dolls	Slumdog Millionaire	Safe
Vicky & Giorgos	23 (6, 6, 6, 5)	Foxtrot	"I Am a Good Girl" – Christina Aguilera	Burlesque	Eliminated
Anthimos & Tzeni	26 (7, 6, 6, 7)	Paso Doble	"Spanish Tango" – James Horner	The Mask of Zorro	Safe
Kostas & Maria	30 (8, 8, 7, 7)	Cha-Cha-Cha	"Can't Stop the Feeling!" – Justin Timberlake	Trolls	Safe
Myriella & Tasos	28 (7, 6, 7, 8)	Samba	"Hey Ma" – Pitbull & J Balvin & Camila Cabello	The Fate of the Furious	Safe
Pinelopi & Elias	31 (8, 7, 8, 8)	Paso Doble	"The Gael" – Dougie MacLean	The Last of the Mohicans	Safe
Michalis & Claudia-Anna	29 (7, 7, 8, 7)	Mambo	"(I've Had) The Time of My Life" – Bill Medley & Jennifer Warnes	Dirty Dancing	Safe
Maria & Elias	27 (7, 7, 7, 6)	Cha-Cha-Cha	"Lady Marmalade" – Christina Aguilera & Mýa & Pink & Lil' Kim	Moulin Rouge!	Safe
Dorothea & Vladimir	23 (6, 5, 6, 6)	Jive	"Misirlou" – Dick Dale	Pulp Fiction	Bottom two

=== Week 5: Greek Night ===
Running order

Couple	Score	Dance	Music	Result
Antonis & Elina	25 (6, 6, 6, 7)	Freestyle	"Etsi Xafnika"- Antonis Remos	Bottom two
Christina & Alexandros	24 (7, 6, 6, 5)	Freestyle	"Oso Eho Foni"- Anna Vissi	Eliminated
Vangelis & Nikoletta	33 (8, 8, 8, 9)	Freestyle	"Sto Asanser"- Valantis	Safe
Myriella & Tasos	31 (8, 7, 8, 8)	Freestyle	"To Dahtilidi"- Dionysis Sxoinas	Safe
Kostas & Maria	28 (7, 7, 7, 7)	Freestyle	"Antexa"- Sakis Rouvas	Safe
Pinelopi & Elias	33 (8, 7, 9, 9)	Freestyle	"Den Horas Pouthena"- Trypes	Safe
Evridiki & Pavlos	26 (6, 6, 7, 7)	Freestyle	"To Kati pou Eheis"- Eleni Foureira	Safe
Annie & Richard	35 (8, 9, 9, 9)	Freestyle	"Misise Me"- Evridiki & Paola	Safe
Michalis & Claudia-Anna	30 (7, 8, 7, 8)	Freestyle	"Ama ta Paro"- Kitrina Podilata	Safe
Dorothea & Vladimir	30 (8, 7, 7, 8)	Freestyle	"Na min Hatheis Pote apo tin Zoi mou"- Marinella	Safe
Maria & Elias	29 (8, 7, 7, 7)	Freestyle	"Enteka Para"- Natassa Theodoridou	Safe
Anthimos & Tzeni	27 (7, 7, 6, 7)	Freestyle	"San Star tou Cinema"- Nikos Ziogalas	Safe

=== Week 6: Rock Night ===
This week the show had Natalia Germanou as a guest judge and her score counted for the final result of this week's elimination. Also Velikova and Meleti switched seats so the judges score is in this order of Kostalas, Meleti, Velikova, Liagkas, Germanou.

Running order

Couple	Score	Dance	Music	Result
Annie & Richard	39 (8, 8, 8, 8, 7)	Quickstep	"Valerie"- Amy Winehouse	Safe
Vangelis & Nikoletta	43 (8, 8, 9, 7, 9) +2	Contemporary	"The Sound of Silence"- Disturbed	Safe
Pinelopi & Elias	43 (9, 8, 8, 7, 9) +2	Tango	"Whatever It Takes"- Imagine Dragons	Safe
Myriella & Tasos	40 (8, 7, 8, 8, 9)	Foxtrot	"Let Her Go"- Passenger	Safe
Michalis & Claudia-Anna	34 (7, 6, 6, 6, 8) +1	Rumba	"Always"- Bon Jovi	Safe
Dorothea & Vladimir	34 (8, 6, 6, 6, 7) +1	Tango	"Viva la Vida"- Coldplay	Eliminated
Kostas & Maria	42 (8, 8, 8, 8, 8) +2	Jive	"O Ymnos ton Mavron Skylion"- Onirama	Safe
Anthimos & Tzeni	35 (7, 7, 7, 7, 7)	Viennese Waltz	"Nothing Else Matters"- Metallica	Safe
Evridiki & Pavlos	34 (7, 6, 6, 6, 8) +1	Jive	"S'afino ston Epomeno"- Giorgos Sampanis	Bottom two
Antonis & Elina	32 (7, 6, 6, 7, 6)	Cha-Cha-Cha	"The Seed (2.0)"- The Roots	Safe
Maria & Elias	40 (8, 7, 7, 7, 9) +2	Paso Doble	"Seven Nation Army"- The White Stripes	Safe
Olga & Giorgos	44 (9, 9, 8, 9, 9)	Paso Doble	"300 Violins"- Jorge Quintero	Immunity due to first appearance on the show

=== Week 7 ===
This week the show had Vicky Hadjivassiliou as a guest judge and her score counted for the final result of this week's elimination. Also Velikova and Meleti switched seats so the judges score is in this order of Kostalas, Meleti, Velikova, Liagkas, Hadjivassiliou.

Running order

Couple	Score	Dance	Music	Result
Michalis & Claudia-Anna	43 (9, 8, 8, 8, 8) +2	Freestyle	"Run"- Ludovico Einaudi	Safe
Evridiki & Pavlos	38 (8, 7, 8, 8, 7)	Freestyle	"To Kyma"- Melisses	Safe
Pinelopi & Elias	37 (8, 8, 7, 7, 7)	Freestyle	"Don't Stop 'Til You Get Enough"- Michael Jackson	Eliminated
Kostas & Maria	40 (8, 8, 8, 8, 6) +2	Freestyle	"You're the One That I Want"- John Travolta & Olivia Newton-John	Safe
Olga & Giorgos	47 (9, 9, 9, 9, 9) +2	Freestyle	"Uninvited"- Alanis Morissette	Safe
Vangelis & Nikoletta	40 (8, 8, 8, 8, 8)	Freestyle	"Na m'agapas"- Vangelis Kakouriotis	Safe
Maggie & Alexandros	30 (6, 6, 6, 6, 6)	Freestyle	"Kiss"- Prince	Immunity due to first appearance on the show
Annie & Richard	51 (9, 10, 10, 10, 10) +2	Freestyle	"Survivor"- Destiny's Child	Safe
Anthimos & Tzeni	40 (8, 8, 8, 8, 8)	Freestyle	"Clubbed to Death"- Rob Dougan	Safe
Maria & Elias	38 (8, 8, 8, 7, 7)	Freestyle	"Halo"- LP	Bottom two
Myriella & Tasos	42 (8, 8, 8, 8, 8) +2	Freestyle	"Livin' la Vida Loca"- Ricky Martin	Safe

=== Week 8: Stand by me ===
This week the show had Maria Solomou as a guest judge and her score counted for the final result of this week's elimination. Also Velikova and Meleti switched seats so the judges score is in this order (Kostalas, Meleti, Velikova, Liagkas, Solomou)

Running order

Couple	Score	Dance	Music	Result
Vangelis & Nikoletta with Martha Vafeiadi	43 (8, 8, 8, 8, 9) +2	Samba	"Súbeme la Radio"- Enrique Iglesias	Safe
Myriella& Tasos with Pinelopi Kourenti	38 (7, 7, 8, 8, 8)	Hip-Hop	"Finesse"- Bruno Mars & Cardi B	Safe
Annie & Richard with Klelia Pantazi	45 (9, 9, 9, 9, 9)	Cha-Cha-Cha	"Be Mine"- Ofenbach	Safe
Olga & Giorgos with Morfoula Ntona	49 (9, 9, 9, 10, 10) +2	Samba	"Bun up the dance"- Dillon Francis & Skrillex	Safe
Evridiki & Pavlos with Laura Narjes	44 (8, 9, 9, 8, 8) +2	Paso Doble	"Paint It Black"- The Rolling Stones	Safe
Maggie & Alexandros with Alexandros Silvestridis	32 (7, 6, 6, 6, 7)	Salsa	"Machika"- J Balvin & Jeon & Anitta	Eliminated
Michalis & Claudia-Anna with Grigoris Seitis	43 (9, 8, 9, 8, 8) +1	Hip-Hop	"Turn Down for What"- DJ Snake & Lil Jon	Safe
Anthimos & Tzeni with Kostas Voutsas	43 (8, 8, 8, 9, 9) +1	Samba	"Hully Gully"- Mimis Plessas	Safe
Kostas & Maria with Mando Gasteratou	47 (9, 9, 9, 9, 9) +2	Salsa	"Conga"- Miami Sound Machine	Safe
Maria & Elias with Giannis Aivazis	43 (9, 8, 8, 9, 9)	Viennese Waltz	"Never Tear Us Apart"- INXS	Bottom two

=== Week 9: Team dances ===
This week the show had Tatiana Stefanidou as a guest judge and her score counted for the final result of this week's elimination. Also Velikova and Meleti switched seats so the judges score is in this order of Kostalas, Meleti, Velikova, Liagkas, Stefanidou.

Running order

Couple	Score	Dance	Music	Result
Olga & Giorgos	47 (9, 9, 9, 10, 10)	Quickstep	"Hit the Road Jack"- Ray Charles	Safe
Kostas & Maria	35 (7, 7, 7, 7, 7)	Contemporary	"Stin Kardia"- Themis Adamantidis	Safe
Anthimos & Tzeni	35 (7, 7, 7, 7, 7)	Hip-Hop	"The Power"- Snap!	Safe
Annie & Richard	47 (10, 9, 9, 9, 10)	Viennese Waltz	"I Put a Spell on You"- Annie Lennox	Eliminated
Michalis & Claudia-Anna	37 (7, 8, 7, 7, 8)	Argentine Tango	"Grand Guignol"- Bajofondo	Bottom two
Myriella & Tasos	43 (9, 8, 8, 9, 9)	Salsa	"Felices los 4" – Maluma	Safe
Vangelis & Nikoletta	45 (8, 9, 8, 10, 10)	Paso Doble	"Centuries" – Fall Out Boy	Safe
Evridiki & Pavlos	42 (8, 8, 8, 9, 9)	Rumba	"Gia Kapoion Logo"- Nikos Oikonomopoulos	Safe
Maria & Elias	38 (8, 8, 7, 7, 8)	Samba	"Shape of You"- Ed Sheeran	Safe
Anthimos & Tzeni; Annie & Richard; Evridiki & Pavlos	45 (9, 9, 9, 9, 9)	Cha-Cha-Cha	"Shut Up and Dance"- Walk the Moon	
Myriella & Tasos; Olga & Giorgos; Kostas & Maria	50 (10, 10, 10, 10, 10)	Paso Doble	"Unstoppable"- E.S. Posthumus	
Vangelis & Nikoletta; Maria & Elias; Michalis & Claudia-Anna	41 (8, 8, 9, 8, 8)	Hip-Hop	"River"- Eminem & Ed Sheeran	

=== Week 10: Cha-Cha-Challenge ===
This week the show had Katerina Gagaki as a guest judge and her score counted for the final result of this week's elimination. Also Velikova and Meleti switched seats so the judges score is in this order of Kostalas, Meleti, Velikova, Liagkas, Gagaki. Also, there was no elimination this week and the couple with the highest combined score from judges and viewers got immunity and was safe for next week.

Running order

Couple	Score	Dance	Music	Result
Anthimos & Tzeni	39 (8, 8, 8, 8, 7)	Mambo	"El Perdón"- Nicky Jam & Enrique Iglesias	Safe
Kostas & Maria	38 (8, 8, 7, 7, 8)	Foxtrot	"Beyond the Sea"- Robbie Williams	Safe
Myriella & Tasos	45 (9, 9, 9, 9, 9)	Viennese Waltz	"Hallelujah"- Alexandra Burke	Safe
Vangelis & Nikoletta	43 (8, 9, 8, 9, 9)	Quickstep	"Are You Gonna Be My Girl"- Jet	Safe
Evridiki & Pavlos	45 (9, 9, 9, 9, 9)	Argentine Tango	"Asi Se Baila El Tango"- Bailongo & Vero Verdier	Safe & Immunity for next week
Michalis & Claudia-Anna	35 (7, 7, 7, 7, 7)	Cha-Cha-Cha	"I Like It Like That"- The Blackout All-Stars	Safe
Olga & Giorgos	46 (9, 9, 8, 10, 10)	Rumba	"Omologo"- Valantis	Safe
Maria & Elias	43 (9, 8, 8, 9, 9)	Hip-Hop	"Worth It"- Fifth Harmony & Kid Ink	Safe
Maria & Vangelis; Evridiki & Anthimos; Olga & Kostas; Myriella & Michalis	4; 0; 0; 0	Cha-Cha-Cha	"Emergency"- Icona Pop "New Rules"- Dua Lipa "Like I Do"- David Guetta & Martin Garrix & Brooks "No Roots"- Alice Merton	

=== Week 11: Latin Marathon ===
This week the show had Nadia Boule as a guest judge and her score counted for the final result of this week's elimination. The judges score are in the order of Kostalas, Boule, Velikova, Liagkas. This week contestants (except Evridiki & Paulos who had immunity) competed in a Latin Marathon. The winning couple were rewarded four extra points. In the dance off, Maria & Elias lost the judges vote 2:1 and were eliminated.

Running order

Couple	Score	Dance	Music	Result
Olga & Giorgos	36 (9, 9, 9, 9)	Hip-Hop	"Team"- Iggy Azalea	Safe
Vangelis & Nikoletta	33 (8, 9, 8, 8)	Cha-Cha-Cha	"Goustaro na Horevo"- 48 Ores	Safe
Michalis & Claudia-Anna	37 (9, 10, 9, 9)	Quickstep	"Alla Mou Len ta Matia Sou"— Gadjo Dilo	Safe
Myriella & Tasos	39 (9, 10, 10, 10)	Paso Doble	"Montagus and Capulets"- Sergei Prokofiev	Bottom two
Kostas & Maria	36 (9, 9, 9, 9)	Samba	"Mad Love"- Sean Paul & David Guetta & Becky G	Safe
Anthimos & Tzeni	34 (8, 9, 9, 8)	Argentine Tango	"Roxanne"- The Police	Safe
Maria & Elias	31 (8, 9, 7, 7)	Quickstep	"Crazy in Love"- Emeli Sandé & The Bryan Ferry Orchestra	Eliminated
Evridiki & Pavlos	36 (9, 9, 9, 9)	Cha-Cha-Cha	"You Don't Know Me"- Jax Jones & Raye	Safe (Immunity from last week)
Olga & Giorgos; Myriella & Tasos; Vangelis & Nikoletta; Maria & Elias; Kostas & Maria; Anthimos & Tzeni; Michalis & Claudia-Anna	4; 0; 0; 0; 0; 0; 0	Cha-Cha-Cha; Samba; Rumba; Jive; Paso Doble	"Summertime"- Billy Stewart "Gasolina"- Daddy Yankee "Say You Won't Let Go"- James Arthur "Don't Stop Me Now"- Queen "España cañí"- Pascual Marquina Narro	

=== Week 12: Solo Night/Hot Battle ===
This week the show had Season 3 winner, Ntoretta Papadimitriou as a guest judge and her score counted for the final result of this week's elimination. The judges score are in the order of Kostalas, Velikova, Liagkas, Papadimitriou. During their routines contestants had to dance solo for 30 seconds during their routine. Later in the show contestants split into two teams: Men vs Women. The winning team were rewarded two extra points. In the dance off, Anthimos & Tzeni lost the judges vote 3:0 and were eliminated.

Running order

Couple	Score	Dance	Music	Result
Kostas & Maria	37 (9, 9, 10, 9)	Jive	"One Way or Another"— One Direction	Safe
Evridiki & Pavlos	39 (10, 9, 10, 10)	Contemporary	"Thinking of You"- Elias	Safe
Michalis & Claudia-Anna	37 (9, 9, 9, 10)	Paso Doble	"Bram Stoker's Dracula"— Wojciech Kilar	Eliminated
Myriella & Tasos	40 (10, 10, 10, 10)	Cha-Cha-Cha	"Woman"- Kesha & The Dap-Kings Horns	Safe
Anthimos & Tzeni	35 (9, 8, 9, 9)	Salsa	"Vivir Mi Vita"- Marc Anthony	Eliminated
Vangelis & Nikoletta	38 (9, 9, 10, 10)	Hip-Hop	"Yeah!"- Usher & Lil Jon & Ludacris	Safe
Olga & Giorgos	40 (10, 10, 10, 10)	Samba	"Sua Cara"- Major Lazer & Anitta & Pabllo Vittar	Bottom two
Boys Team (Anthimos, Vangelis, Michalis, Kostas, Giorgos, Pavlos, Tasos) vs Girls Team (Myriella, Olga, Evridiki, Nikoletta, Tzeni, Claudia-Anna, Maria)	2 0	Freestyle Freestyle	"Hot Stuff"- Donna Summer "Shaky Shaky"—Daddy Yankee	

=== Week 13: Semi-finals ===
This week the show had season 4 winner, Isaias Matiamba as a guest judge and his score counted for the final result of this week's elimination. The judges score are in the order of Kostalas, Velikova, Liagkas, Matiamba. This week, contestants were required to dance twice. The first was chosen by the production and the second by the contestants. In the dance off, Myriella & Tasos lost the judges vote 2:1 and were eliminated.

Running order

Couple	Score	Dance	Music	Result
Olga & Giorgos	36 (9, 9, 9, 9)	Jive	"Footloose" – Kenny Loggins	Bottom two
Olga & Giorgos	40 (10, 10, 10, 10)	Argentine Tango	"Human"—Sevdaliza	Bottom two
Kostas & Maria	36 (9, 9, 9, 9)	Viennese Waltz	"Fila me Akoma"- Panos Mouzourakis & Kostis Maraveyas	Eliminated
Kostas & Maria	36 (9, 9, 9, 9)	Samba	"Tranquila" – J Balvin & Eleni Foureira	Eliminated
Evridiki & Pavlos	35 (9, 8, 9, 9)	Salsa	"Despacito"- Luis Fonsi & Daddy Yankee	Safe
Evridiki & Pavlos	40 (10, 10, 10, 10)	Pole Dance	"Gangsta's Paradise"- 2WEI	Safe
Vangelis & Nikoletta	38 (9, 10, 10, 9)	Argentine Tango	"Assassin's Tango"- John Powell	Safe
Vangelis & Nikoletta	40 (10, 10, 10, 10)	Freestyle	"Archangel"- Two Steps from Hell	Safe
Myriella & Tasos	36 (9, 9, 9, 9)	Rumba	"Love Me like You Do"- Kurt Hugo Schneider	Eliminated
Myriella & Tasos	40 (10, 10, 10, 10)	Contemporary	"In This Shirt"- The Irrepressibles	Eliminated

=== Week 14: Finals ===
This week the show had Charis Christopoulos as a guest judge. The judges score are in the order of Kostalas, Velikova, Liagkas, Christopoulos.

Running order

Couple	Score	Dance	Music	Result
Evridiki & Pavlos	36 (9, 9, 9, 9)	Argentine Tango	"Asi Se Baila El Tango"- Bailongo & Vero Verdier	Runner-up
Evridiki & Pavlos	38 (10, 9, 9, 10)	Cha-Cha-Cha	"Let's Get Loud"- Jennifer Lopez	Runner-up
Evridiki & Pavlos	40 (10, 10, 10, 10)	Dance-off	"(I Just) Died in Your Arms"- Hidden Citizens	Runner-up
Vangelis & Nikoletta	36 (9, 9, 9, 9)	Viennese Waltz	"A Thousand Years" – Christina Perri	Winner
Vangelis & Nikoletta	39 (10, 10, 10, 9)	Jive	"Shake It Off"—Tanner Patrick	Winner
Vangelis & Nikoletta	40 (10, 10, 10, 10)	Dance-off	"(I Just) Died in Your Arms"- Hidden Citizens	Winner
Olga & Giorgos	39 (10, 10, 9, 10)	Quickstep	"Hit the Road Jack"- Ray Charles	Third place
Olga & Giorgos	40 (10, 10, 10, 10)	Rumba	"Starboy"—The Weeknd	Third place

== Guest stars ==
#	Live	Guest	Occupation	Partner	Style
1	7	Sofina Lazaraki	Actress	Giorgos Linardatos	Argentine Tango
2	8	Nikos Koklonis	Businessman	Anna Polyzou	Freestyle
3	9	Demy	Singer	Multiple dancers	Freestyle
4	11	Apostolia Zoi	Singer	Oleksandr Bakharyev and Multiple dancers	Freestyle
5	12	Ntoretta Papadimitriou	Actress, TV Hostess	Pavlos Manogiannakis	Argentine Tango
