= Dancing with the Stars (Greek TV series) season 5 =

Dancing with the Stars
- Season 5
- Celebrity winner: Morfoula Ntona
- Professional winner: Richard Szilagyi
- No. of episodes: 14

Release
- Original network: ANT1
- Original release: 26 October 2014 – 1 February 2015

Season chronology
- ← Previous; Season 4 Next → Season 6

Dancing with the Stars is a Greek reality show airing on ANT1 and filming live in Athens. Returned for its fifth season on 26 October 2014 from ANT1 TV channel. The show is based on the United Kingdom BBC Television series Strictly Come Dancing and is part of BBC Worldwide's Dancing with the Stars franchise. The theme song is "It's personal" performed by Swedish indie pop band The Radio Dept.

The host of this season will be Doukissa Nomikou. Giannis Latsios, Alexis Kostalas, Galena Velikova and Katia Dandoulaki returned as the judges of the show. Lakis Gavalas is the fifth judge in fifth season of the show.

The celebrities who were competed this season were 8 women and 6 men; Christina Aloupi, Maria Iliaki, Nikoleta Karra, Niki Kartsona, Morfoula Ntona, Eirini Papadopoulou, Thalia Prokopiou, Elisavet Spanou, Theoxaris Ioannidis, Fanis Lampropoulos, Thanos Petrelis, Christos Spanos, Triantafyllos and Thanasis Viskadourakis. The professional partners were revealed on 22 October 2014.

The premiere of the show the 14 couples danced for the first time 14 different dances.

After the 3rd live Kartsona's partner left the show for personal reasons and his place was taken by Vladimir Morotsko who had just left the actress Thalia Prokopiou in 3rd live.

In week 6 the ten couples were divided into five groups. The two couples each group danced the same dance and one of the two couples received two extra points. If both had ties going through one point.

In week 7 the couples danced to songs of their choice. At the end of the evening one of the couples would win immunity and will be excluded from the process of withdrawal from next week. Also in the 7 week there was redundancy.

In 10th live Nikoleta Karra did not dance because of her partner's accident.

In 11th live two couples did not dance, Theocharis Ioannidis due to professional obligations and Christos Spanos because of an accident he had, leading to his withdrawal. Αlso in 11th live could not dance again the Nikoletta Karra's partner could not dance again and was replaced by Alexandros Papadopoulos.

== Judges ==
- Alexis Kostalas, announcer, sports commentator
- Galena Velikova, choreographer, dancer, dance teacher. Galena has also been a judge at Dancing Stars, the Bulgarian version of the show, for seasons 1&3.
- Giannis Latsios, ANT1 television program manager
- Katia Dandoulaki, actress
- Lakis Gavalas, Fashion designer

== Couples ==
Celebrity	Occupation	Professional partner	Status
Triantafyllos	Singer	Fotini Papastavrou	Eliminated 1st on 2 November 2014
Thalia Prokopiou	Actress	Vladimir Morotsko	Eliminated 2nd on 9 November 2014
Christina Aloupi	Model, TV Presenter, Actress	Gaetano Parisi	Eliminated 3rd on 16 November 2014
Elisavet Spanou	Singer	Elias Ladas	Eliminated 4th on 23 November 2014
Thanasis Viskadourakis	Actor	Evi Semprou	Eliminated 5th on 30 November 2014
Thanos Petrelis	Singer	Claudia-Anna Stoyia	Eliminated 6th on 14 December 2014
Maria Iliaki	TV Presenter	Paulos Manogiannakis	Eliminated 7th on 21 December 2014
Fanis Lampropoulos	TV Presenter, Comedian	Tzeni Nikolentzou	Eliminated 8th on 28 December 2014
Christos Spanos	Actor	Maria Antimisari	Withdrew on 4 January 2015
Niki Kartsona	TV Presenter, Businesswoman	Dionisis Klampanis; Vladimir Morotsko (Weeks 4–11)	Eliminated 9th on 4 January 2015
Theoxaris Ioannidis	Actor	Anastasia Draka	Eliminated 10th on 11 January 2015
Nikoleta Karra	Actress	Thodoris Panagakos; Alexandros Papadopoulos (Weeks 11–13)	Third Place on 18 January 2015
Eirini Papadopoulou	Singer	Konstantinos Papazoglou	Runner-up on 1 February 2015
Morfoula Ntona	Olympic Rhythmic Gymnastics	Richard Szilagyi	Winner on 1 February 2015

== Scoring chart ==
Couple	Place	1	2	1+2	3	4	5	6	7	8	7+8	9	10	11	12	13	14
Morfoula & Richard	1	35	34	69	34	36	35	40	46	–	46	50	47	45+48=93	50+50=100	50+50=100	50+50+50=150
Eirini & Konstantinos	2	32	31	63	34	31	33	36	36	41	77	40	45	41+48=89	47+50=97	48+48=96	50+47+50=147
Nikoleta & Thodoris	3	31	33	64	35	32	33	37	43	44	87	45	–	44+45=89	44+50=94	46+50=96	
Theoxaris & Anastasia	4	28	27	55	27	34	26	31	35	35	70	41	41	–	45+46=91		
Niki & Dionisis	5	25	29	54	29	33	32	35	44	36	80	43	42	43+39=82			
Christos & Maria	6	33	26	59	32	33	35	37	40	44	84	43	47	–	-		
Fanis & Tzeni	7	26	23	49	22	24	21	25	29	27	56	32	33				
Maria & Paulos	8	25	24	49	29	30	31	26	40	33	73	39					
Thanos & Claudia-Anna	9	27	27	54	29	32	27	34	37	36	73						
Thanasis & Evi	10	24	21	45	28	26	22	27									
Elisavet & Elias	11	30	25	55	30	33	34										
Christina & Gaetano	12	26	26	52	23	30											
Thalia & Vladimir	13	31	29	60	28												
Triantafyllos & Fotini	14	23	22	45													

Red numbers indicate the lowest score for each week
Green numbers indicate the highest score for each week
the couple got the lowest score of the night and was eliminated that week
the couple eliminated that week
the returning couple finishing in the bottom two
the couple danced, but not scored
this couple withdrew from the competition
the winning couple
the runner-up couple
the third-place couple
the couple did not dance this week

=== Average score chart ===
This table only counts for dances scored on a traditional 50-points scale.

Rank by average	Place	Couple	Total points	Number of dances	Average
1	1	Morfoula & Richard	798	18	44.3
2	2	Eirini & Konstantinos	786	19	41.4
3	3	Nikoleta & Thodoris	611	15	40.7
4	6	Christos & Maria	375	10	37.5
5	5	Niki & Dionisis	433	12	36.1
6	4	Theoxaris & Anastasia	416	12	34.7
7	9	Thanos & Claudia-Anna	249	8	31.1
8	8	Maria & Paulos	277	9	30.8
9	11	Elisavet & Elias	152	5	30.4
10	13	Thalia & Vladimir	88	3	29.3
11	12	Christina & Gaetano	105	4	26.3
12	7	Fanis & Tzeni	262	10	26.2
13	10	Thanasis & Evi	148	6	24.7
14	14	Triantafyllos & Fotini	45	2	22.5

== Highest and lowest scoring performances ==
Dance	Best Dancer	Best Score	Worst Dancer	Worst Score
Cha-Cha-Cha	Morfoula Ntona	50	Christina Aloupi	23
Bachata	Theoxaris Ioannidis	35	Triantafyllos; Fanis Lampropoulos	23
Salsa	Christos Spanos	44	Maria Iliaki	26
Tango	Eirini Papadopoulou	50	Thanos Petrelis	27
Samba	Eirini Papadopoulou	48	Eirini Papadopoulou	32
Waltz	Thalia Prokopiou	31	-	-
Viennese Waltz	Eirini Papadopoulou	50	Theoxaris Ioannidis; Fanis Lampropoulos	26
Foxtrot	Nikoleta Karra	44	Thanasis Viskadourakis	21
Jive	Eirini Papadopoulou	48	Thanasis Viskadourakis	24
Paso Doble	Nikoleta Karra	50	Fanis Lampropoulos	21
Argentine Tango	Morfoula Ntona	50	Theoxaris Ioannidis	27
Quickstep	Morfoula Ntona	50	Thanasis Viskadourakis	22
Mambo	Morfoula Ntona	38	Fanis Lampropoulos	25
Rumba	Morfoula Ntona	50	Niki Kartsona	25
Freestyle	Morfoula Ntona; Eirini Papadopoulou	50	Fanis Lampropoulos	24
Lambada	Eirini Papadopoulou	36	-	-
Contemporary	Morfoula Ntona; Theoxaris Ioannidis	46	Theoxaris Ioannidis	35
Bollywood	Maria Iliaki	40	-	-
Merengue	Fanis Lampropoulos	29	-	-
Disco	Fanis Lampropoulos	29	-	-

== Couples' highest and lowest scoring dances ==
According to the traditional 50-point scale:

Couples	Highest scoring dance(s)	Lowest scoring dance(s)
Christina & Gaetano	Freestyle (30)	Cha-cha-cha (23)
Maria & Paulos	Bollywood (40)	Cha-cha-cha (24)
Theoxaris & Anastasia	Contemporary (46)	Viennese Waltz (26)
Nikoleta & Thodoris	Paso Doble (50)	Cha-cha-cha (31)
Niki & Dionisis	Contemporary (44)	Rumba (25)
Fanis & Tzeni	Viennese Waltz (33)	Paso Doble (21)
Morfoula & Richard	Freestyle(x4), Rumba, Argentine Tango, Quickstep & Cha-cha-cha (50)	Cha-cha-cha & Viennese Waltz (34)
Eirini & Konstantinos	Viennese Waltz, Tango, Freestyle (50)	Bachata & Freestyle (31)
Thanos & Claudia-Anna	Foxtrot (37)	Tango, Jive & Qiuckstep (27)
Thalia & Vladimir	Waltz (31)	Cha-cha-cha (28)
Christos & Maria	Quickstep (47)	Jive (26)
Elisavet & Elias	Paso Doble (34)	Cha-cha-cha (25)
Triantafyllos & Fotini	Bachata (23)	Paso Doble (22)
Thanasis & Evi	Mambo (28)	Foxtrot (21)

== Weekly scores ==
Unless indicated otherwise, individual judges scores in the charts below (given in parentheses) are listed in this order from left to right: Alexis Kostalas, Galena Velikova, Giannis Latsios, Katia Dandoulaki and Lakis Gavalas.

=== Week 1 ===
Running order

Couple	Score	Dance	Music
Nikoleta & Thodoris	31 (6, 7, 6, 6, 6)	Cha-cha-cha	"I Love It" - Icona Pop feat. Charli XCX
Triantafyllos & Fotini	23 (5, 5, 5, 4, 4)	Bachata	"Just The Way you Are" - Karlos Rosé
Elisavet & Elias	30 (6, 7, 6, 5, 6)	Salsa	"Cuba" - Robert Abigail & DJ Rebel feat. The Gibson Brothers
Thanos & Claudia-Anna	27 (5, 6, 5, 6, 5)	Tango	"Sweet Dreams" - Axwell, Steve Angello & Sebastian Ingrosso
Eirini & Konstantinos	32 (6, 6, 6, 7, 7)	Samba	"Tranquila" - J Balvin feat. Eleni Foureira
Thalia & Vladimir	31 (7, 6, 6, 6, 6)	Waltz	"Apologize" - OneRepublic
Fanis & Tzeni	26 (5, 5, 5, 5, 6)	Viennese Waltz	"The Nutcracker: Waltz of the Flowers" - Pyotr Ilich Tchaikovsky
Maria & Paulos	25 (5, 5, 5, 5, 5)	Foxtrot	"Viva La Vida" - Berk & The Virtual Band
Thanasis & Evi	24 (5, 4, 5, 5, 5)	Jive	"I Saw Her Standing There" - The Beatles
Theoxaris & Anastasia	28 (5, 5, 5, 6, 7)	Paso Doble	"Frozen" - Talisman
Morfoula & Richard	35 (7, 7, 7, 7, 7)	Argentine tango	"Otra Luna" - Narcotango
Christos & Maria	33 (6, 7, 7, 7, 6)	Quickstep	"Tu Vuo' Fa L'americano" - Dany Brillant
Christina & Gaetano	26 (5, 5, 6, 5, 5)	Mambo	"Fireball" - Pitbull feat. John Ryan
Niki & Dionisis	27 (5, 5, 5, 6, 6)	Rumba	"I Nyhta Dyo Kommatia" - Antonis Remos

=== Week 2 ===
Running order

Couple	Score	Dance	Music	Result
Elisavet & Elias	25 (5, 5, 5, 5, 5)	Cha-cha-cha	"Sing" - Ed Sheeran	Safe
Thanasis & Evi	21 (4, 4, 5, 4, 4)	Foxtrot	"Beyond the Sea" - Robbie Williams	Safe
Christos & Maria	26 (5, 5, 6, 5, 5)	Jive	"Hey Ya!" - OutKast	Safe
Nikoleta & Thodoris	33 (6, 7, 7, 7, 6)	Argentine tango	"My love" - Kovacs	Safe
Eirini & Konstantinos	31 (6, 6, 6, 6, 7)	Bachata	"Roxanne" - Massimo Scalici	Safe
Thanos & Claudia-Anna	27 (5, 6, 6, 5, 5)	Jive	"Crazy Little Thing Called Love" - Michael Bublé	Safe
Fanis & Tzeni	23 (4, 5, 4, 5, 5)	Bachata	"Te Extraño" - Xtreme	Safe
Maria & Paulos	24 (5, 5, 4, 5, 5)	Cha-cha-cha	"Ti Trela Mou Zitas" - Dionisis Shinas feat. REC & Fani Avramidou	Safe
Triantafyllos & Fotini	22 (4, 4, 5, 5, 4)	Paso Doble	"The Final Countdown" - Europe	Eliminated
Morfoula & Richard	34 (7, 7, 6, 7, 7)	Cha-cha-cha	"Rolling In The Deep" - Aretha Franklin	Safe
Niki & Dionisis	29 (6, 6, 6, 6, 5)	Viennese Waltz	"I'm with You" - Avril Lavigne	Bottom two
Theoxaris & Anastasia	27 (5, 5, 5, 6, 6)	Argentine tango	"Bust Your Windows" - Jazmine Sullivan	Safe
Thalia & Vladimir	29 (6, 6, 6, 6, 5)	Paso Doble	"Losing My Religion" - Lacuna Coil	Safe
Christina & Gaetano	26 (6, 5, 5, 5, 5)	Foxtrot	"Bad Romance" - Lulu	Safe

=== Week 3 ===
Running order

Couple	Score	Dance	Music	Result
Thanos & Claudia-Anna	29 (5, 6, 6, 6, 6)	Paso Doble	"The 5th" - David Garrett	Safe
Eirini & Konstantinos	34 (7, 7, 7, 7, 6)	Tango	"Addicted to You" - Orchestra Alec Medina	Safe
Maria & Paulos	29 (6, 6, 5, 6, 6)	Quickstep	"Careless Whisper" - Vintage 1930's Jazz Wham! Cover feat. Dave Koz	Safe
Niki & Dionisis	29 (6, 6, 6, 6, 5)	Cha-cha-cha	"Love Is Gone" - David Guetta	Safe
Christos & Maria	32 (7, 6, 6, 7, 6)	Argentine tango	"Return of the Tres" - Delinquent Habits	Safe
Thanasis & Evi	28 (6, 5, 5, 6, 6)	Mambo	"Colegiala"- Various Artists	Safe
Morfoula & Richard	34 (7, 7, 6, 7, 7)	Viennese Waltz	"Ena Fili" - Haris Alexiou	Safe
Fanis & Tzeni	22 (5, 4, 3, 5, 5)	Foxtrot	"Moondance" - Michael Bublé	Safe
Theoxaris & Anastasia	27 (5, 5, 5, 6, 6)	Jive	"Uprising" - Muse	Bottom two
Elisavet & Elias	30 (6, 6, 6, 6, 6)	Viennese Waltz	"Hallelujah" - Alexandra Burke	Safe
Thalia & Vladimir	28 (6, 4, 6, 6, 6)	Cha-cha-cha	"Changes" - Faul & Wad Ad vs. Pnau	Eliminated
Christina & Gaetano	23 (5, 4, 4, 5, 5)	Cha-cha-cha	"Kane Kati" - Boys + Noise	Safe
Nikoleta & Thodoris	35 (7, 7, 7, 7, 7)	Salsa	"This Love/Que Amor" - Marlow Rosado & La Riqueña	Safe

=== Week 4: Greek night ===
Running order

Couple	Score	Dance	Music	Result
Maria & Paulos	30 (6, 6, 6, 6, 6)	Freestyle	"Tetarti Vradi" - Melina Aslanidou feat. Antonis Remos	Safe
Fanis & Tzeni	24 (5, 5, 4, 5, 5)	Freestyle	"S' Exw Erwteftei" - Sakis Rouvas	Safe
Thanasis & Evi	26 (5, 5, 4, 6, 6)	Freestyle	"Lola" - Kostis Maraveyas	Bottom Two
Eirini & Konstantinos	31 (6, 6, 7, 6, 6)	Freestyle	"Oso O Kosmos Tha Ehi Esena" - Demy feat. Mike	Safe
Christos & Maria	33 (6, 7, 6, 7, 7)	Freestyle	"Ena" - Melisses	Safe
Niki & Vladimir	33 (7, 6, 7, 7, 6)	Freestyle	"Akrogialies Dilina" - Eleonora Zouganeli	Safe
Theoxaris & Anastasia	34 (6, 7, 7, 7, 7)	Freestyle	"Monos Mou" - Kostas Martakis	Safe
Christina & Gaetano	30 (6, 6, 6, 6, 6)	Freestyle	"Kardies Apo Asteria" - Stelios Legakis	Eliminated
Nikoleta & Thodoris	32 (6, 6, 7, 6, 7)	Freestyle	"Hano Esena" - Despina Vandi	Safe
Thanos & Claudia-Anna	32 (6, 6, 6, 7, 7)	Freestyle	"Anapantita" - Antonis Remos	Safe
Elisavet & Elias	33 (7, 6, 6, 7, 7)	Freestyle	"Poion Agapas" - Giorgos Sabanis	Safe
Morfoula & Richard	36 (7, 8, 7, 7, 7)	Freestyle	"Krypsou" - Natasa Bofiliou	Safe

=== Week 5: Movie night ===
Running order

Couple	Score	Dance	Music	Film - Series	Result
Thanos & Claudia-Anna	27 (6, 5, 5, 5, 6)	Qiuckstep	"You're the One That I Want" - Olivia Newton-John & John Travolta	Grease	Safe
Nikoleta & Thodoris	33 (7, 7, 7, 6, 6)	Viennese Waltz	"Favourite Things" - Big Brovaz	The Sound of Music	Safe
Maria & Paulos	31 (7, 6, 6, 6, 6)	Jive	"Footloose" - Kenny Loggins	Footloose	Safe
Theoxaris & Anastasia	26, (6, 4, 5, 5, 6)	Viennese Waltz	"Game of Thrones" - Ramin Djawadi	Game of Thrones	Safe
Eirini & Konstantinos	33 (7, 6, 7, 6, 7)	Jive	"Happy" - Pharrell Williams	Despicable Me 2	Safe
Christos & Maria	35 (7, 7, 7, 7, 7)	Viennese Waltz	"The Railway Station" - Evanthia Reboutsika	Politiki kouzina	Safe
Niki & Vladimir	32 (7, 6, 6, 6, 7)	Argentine tango	"Assassin's Tango" - John Powell	Mr. & Mrs. Smith	Bottom Two
Morfoula & Richard	35 (7, 7, 7, 7, 7)	Quickstep	"I'll Be There for You" - The Rembrandts	Friends	Safe
Fanis & Tzeni	21 (4, 4, 4, 4, 5)	Paso Doble	"Burning Heart" - Survivor	Rocky IV	Safe
Thanasis & Evi	22 (4, 4, 4, 5, 5)	Quickstep	"Take My Breath Away" - The Burger Project	Top Gun	Safe
Elisavet & Elias	34 (7, 7, 7, 7, 6)	Paso Doble	"Crazy in Love" - Kadebostany	Fifty Shades of Grey	Eliminated

=== Week 6: Duel night ===
Running order

Couple	Score	Dance	Music	Result
Christos & Maria	37 (7, 7, 8, 7, 7) +1	Paso Doble	"Kashmir" - Escala	Safe
Nikoleta & Thodoris	37 (7, 7, 7, 8, 7) +1	Paso Doble	"Time Is Running Out" - Muse	Safe
Maria & Paulos	26 (5, 5, 5, 5, 6)	Salsa	"Ain't Nobody" - Alex Wilson	Safe
Niki & Vladimir	35 (7, 6, 6, 7, 7) +2	Salsa	"Gangsters Paradise" - Havana Express	Safe
Theoxaris & Anastasia	31 (6, 6, 6, 7, 6)	Foxtrot	"Swing Supreme" - Robbie Williams	Safe
Eirini & Konstantinos	36 (7, 7, 7, 6, 7) +2	Foxtrot	"Champs Élysées" - Zaz	Bottom Two
Fanis & Tzeni	25 (5, 5, 5, 5, 5)	Mambo	"Mambo No. 5" - Lou Bega	Safe
Morfoula & Richard	40 (8, 7, 7, 8, 8) +2	Mambo	"Conga" - Gloria Estefan	Safe
Thanasis & Evi	27 (5, 5, 5, 6, 6)	Viennese Waltz	"Altalena" - Various Artists	Eliminated
Thanos & Claudia-Anna	34 (6, 6, 7, 6, 7) +2	Viennese Waltz	Bolshoi Theatre Orchestra	Safe

=== Week 7: Favorite song ===
- This week the couple with the highest combined score from judges and viewers got immunity and was safe for next week.
- There was no elimination this week.

Running order

Couple	Score	Dance	Music	Result
Eirini & Konstantinos	36 (7, 7, 8, 7, 7)	Lambada	"Taboo" - Don Omar	Safe
Theoxaris & Anastasia	35 (7, 7, 7, 7, 7)	Contemporary	"My Immortal" - Evanescence	Safe
Morfoula & Richard	46 (9, 9, 10, 9, 9)	Paso Doble & Contemporary	"Carmina Burana" - Deutsche Opera Orchestra	Safe + Immunity for next week
Thanos & Claudia-Anna	37 (8, 7, 8, 7, 7)	Foxtrot	"Felling Good" - Michael Bublé	Safe
Maria & Paulos	40 (8, 8, 8, 8, 8)	Bollywood	"Tsifteteli (Dance mix)" - Kostas Monachos	Safe
Christos & Maria	40 (8, 8, 9, 7, 8)	Contemporary	"Marina" - Alexia	Safe
Fanis & Tzeni	29 (6, 6, 5, 6, 6)	Merengue & Disco	"Xwris Esena" - VIPS	Safe
Niki & Vladimir	44 (8, 9, 9, 9, 9)	Contemporary	"To Xeirokrotima" - Alkistis Protopsalti	Safe
Nikoleta & Thodoris	43 (8, 8, 9, 9, 9)	Rumba	"El Corazon" - Arno Elias	Safe

=== Week 8 ===
- Nomikou announced during the live show that Morfoula, who won the immunity the previous week, was not going to get scored for her dance.

Running order

Couple	Score	Dance	Music	Result
Christos & Maria	44 (8, 9, 9, 9, 9)	Salsa	"Ya" - DLG	Safe
Niki & Vladimir	36 (7, 7, 7, 7, 8)	Paso Doble	"Enjoy the Silence" - Lacuna Coil	Safe
Nikoleta & Thodoris	44 (9, 9, 9, 9, 8)	Quickstep	"Je Suis Grecque" - Melina Mercouri	Safe
Thanos & Claudia-Anna	36 (7, 7, 7, 7, 8)	Mambo	"Vivir Mi Vida" - Marc Anthony	Eliminated
Maria & Paulos	33 (7, 6, 6, 7, 7)	Argentine tango	"I've Seen That Face Before" - Kovacs	Safe
Eirini & Konstantinos	41 (8, 8, 8, 8, 9)	Cha-cha-cha	"Chain Of Fools" - Rhythms del Mundo	Safe
Fanis & Tzeni	27 (5, 5, 5, 6, 6)	Quickstep	"Petao" - Mariza Rizou, Panos Mouzourakis & Yiannis Christodoulopoulos	Bottom Two
Theoxaris & Anastasia	35 (7, 7, 7, 7, 7)	Bachata	"Get Lucky" - LJ & Willy William (Bachata version)	Safe
Morfoula & Richard	Not scored	Jive	"Shake It Off" - Taylor Swift	Safe (Immunity from last week)

=== Week 9: Christmas show ===
- All the couples competed in a Christmas Swing Marathon. The winner couple took 5 extra points from the judges while the rest couples didn't get scored.

Running order

Couple	Score	Dance	Music	Result
Niki & Vladimir	43 (9, 9, 9, 8, 8)	Freestyle	"Rocking Around The Christmas Tree" - Miley Cyrus	Safe
Fanis & Tzeni	32 (6, 6, 6, 7, 7)	Freestyle	"Mis Deseos/Feliz Navidad" - Michael Bublé & Thalía	Bottom Two
Eirini & Konstantinos	40 (8, 8, 8, 8, 8)	Freestyle	"Fetos ta Christougenna" - Stan	Safe
Nikoleta & Thodoris	45 (9, 9, 9, 9, 9)	Freestyle	"So this is Christmas" - Thomas Berge ft. Pearl Jozefzoon & Nigel Brown	Safe
Christos & Maria	43 (8, 8, 9, 9, 9)	Freestyle	"Come On, Christmas" - Matthew West	Safe
Maria & Paulos	39 (8, 8, 7, 8, 8)	Freestyle	"Christmas Time" - Christina Aguilera	Eliminated
Morfoula & Richard	50 (10, 10, 10, 10, 10)	Freestyle	"Mary, Did You Know?" - Pentatonix	Safe
Theoxaris & Anastasia	41 (8, 8, 8, 8, 9)	Freestyle	"Merry Christmas (I Don't Want to Fight Tonight)" - Ramones	Safe
Christos & Maria; Morfoula & Richard; Nikoleta & Thodoris; Eirini & Konstantinos; Niki & Vladimir; Maria & Paulos; Theoxaris & Anastasia; Fanis & Tzeni	5; 0; 0; 0; 0; 0; 0; 0	Christmas; Swing; Marathon	"Swing Swing Swing" - Vanilla Swing	

=== Week 10: New Year's Eve show ===
Running order

Couple	Score	Dance	Music	Result
Theoxaris & Anastasia	41 (8, 8, 9, 8, 8)	Paso Doble	"El Gato Montes" - Banda de la Plaza de Toros	Safe
Eirini & Konstantinos	45 (9, 9, 9, 9, 9)	Samba	"Bailando" - Enrique Iglesias feat. Sean Paul, Descemer Bueno & Gente de Zona	Safe
Christos & Maria	47 (9, 9, 10, 9, 10)	Quickstep	"Cheek to Cheek" - Tony Bennett & Lady Gaga	Safe
Fanis & Tzeni	33 (7, 6, 6, 7, 7)	Viennese Waltz	"Masquerade" - Aram Khachaturian Philarmonia Orchestra	Eliminated
Morfoula & Richard	47 (10, 9, 9, 10, 9)	Argentine tango	"Rayuela" - Gotan Project	Safe
Niki & Vladimir	42 (9, 8, 8, 9, 8)	Rumba	"If You Go Away" - Patricia Kaas	Bottom Two
Niki & Vladimir; Eirini & Konstantinos; Morfoula & Richard; Christos & Maria; Theoxaris & Anastasia; Fanis & Tzeni	3; 2; 1; 0; 0; 0	Freestyle	"Chandelier" - Sia "Talk Dirty" - Jason Derulo feat. 2 Chainz "Blank Space" - Taylor Swift "Dangerous" - David Guetta feat. Sam Martin "Uptown Funk" - Mark Ronson feat. Bruno Mars "Love Never Felt So Good" - Michael Jackson & Justin Timberlake	

=== Week 11: Instant Dance Challenge ===
Running order

Couple	Score	Dance	Music	Result
Niki & Vladimir	43 (9, 8, 8, 9, 9)	Quickstep	"Hey, Soul Sister" - Train	Eliminated
Nikoleta & Alexandros	44 (8, 9, 9, 9, 9)	Foxtrot	"For Once in My Life" - Michael Bublé	Bottom Two
Morfoula & Richard	45 (9, 9, 9, 9, 9)	Samba	"Give It Up to Me" - Sean Paul	Safe
Eirini & Konstantinos	41 (8, 8, 8, 8, 9)	Viennese Waltz	"What Are The Chances" - Dusk	Safe
Niki & Vladimir	39 (8, 8, 8, 7, 8)	Instant Dance	"I Feel the Earth Move" - Jessie Mueller & Beautiful Company	
Nikoleta & Alexandros	45 (9, 9, 9, 9, 9)	Instant Dance	"Min Orkizesai" - Eleftheria Arvanitaki	
Morfoula & Richard	48 (9, 10, 10, 10, 9)	Instant Dance	"Mr. Pinstripe Suit" - Big Bad Voodoo Daddy	
Eirini & Konstantinos	48 (9, 9, 10, 10, 10)	Instant Dance	"Girlfriend" - Avril Lavigne	

=== Week 12: Iconic dance night ===
Running order

Couple	Score	Dance	Music	Result
Eirini & Konstantinos	47 (9, 9, 9, 10, 10)	Paso Doble	"Saga of the Immortals" - The Immediate	Bottom Two
Eirini & Konstantinos	50 (10, 10, 10, 10, 10)	Viennese Waltz	"La valse d'Amélie" - Yann Tiersen	Bottom Two
Theoxaris & Anastasia	45 (9, 9, 9, 9, 9)	Quickstep	"Are You Gonna Be My Girl" - Qp	Eliminated
Theoxaris & Anastasia	46 (9, 9, 9, 9, 10)	Contemporary	"Nostalgia" - Yanni	Eliminated
Morfoula & Richard	50 (10, 10, 10, 10, 10)	Rumba	"Ain't No Sunshine" - Lighthouse Family	Safe
Morfoula & Richard	50 (10, 10, 10, 10, 10)	Freestyle	"Don't Cry for Me Argentina" - Madonna	Safe
Nikoleta & Alexandros	44 (9, 9, 9, 9, 8)	Samba	"La Vida Es Un Carnaval" — Michael Chacon	Safe
Nikoleta & Alexandros	50 (10, 10, 10, 10, 10)	Paso Doble	"It's My Life" - Bon Jovi	Safe

=== Week 13: Semi-Finals (Solo & Trio challenge) ===
- For the trio challenge the couples were partnered with a previous season. The couples chose their third partner by drawing envelopes at the end of the show of week 12. Ntona danced with Pantazi (season 4), Papadopoulou danced with Stikoudi (season 4) & Karra danced with Synatsaki (season 4).

Running order

Couple	Score	Dance	Music	Result
Nikoleta & Alexandros (with Mary Synatsaki)	46 (9, 9, 10, 9, 9)	Freestyle	"(I've Had) The Time of My Life" - Bill Medley & Jennifer Warnes	Eliminated; Third place
Nikoleta & Alexandros (with Mary Synatsaki)	50 (10, 10, 10, 10, 10)	Paso Doble	"Time Is Running Out" - Muse	Eliminated; Third place
Morfoula & Richard (with Klelia Pantazi)	50 (10, 10, 10, 10, 10)	Freestyle	"Let It Go" - Demi Lovato	Bottom Two
Morfoula & Richard (with Klelia Pantazi)	50 (10, 10, 10, 10, 10)	Argentine tango	"Otra Luna" - Narcotango	Bottom Two
Eirini & Konstantinos (with Katerina Stikoudi)	48 (9, 9, 10, 10, 10)	Freestyle	"Lady Marmalade" - Christina Aguilera, Lil' Kim, Mýa & Pink	Safe
Eirini & Konstantinos (with Katerina Stikoudi)	48 (9, 9, 10, 10, 10)	Samba	"Tranquila" - J Balvin	Safe

=== Week 14: Finals ===
Running order

Couple	Score	Dance	Music	Result
Morfoula & Richard	50 (10, 10, 10, 10, 10)	Quickstep	"Mr. Pinstripe Suit" - Big Bad Voodoo Daddy	Winner
Morfoula & Richard	50 (10, 10, 10, 10, 10)	Cha-cha-cha	"Beggin'" - Madcon	Winner
Morfoula & Richard	50 (10, 10, 10, 10, 10)	Dance-off	"Take Me to Church" - Hozier	Winner
Eirini & Konstantinos	50 (10, 10, 10, 10, 10)	Tango	"Addicted to You" - Orchestra Alec Medina	Runner-up
Eirini & Konstantinos	47 (9, 9, 9, 10, 10)	Cha-cha-cha	"Impossible" - Daniel Merriweather	Runner-up
Eirini & Konstantinos	50 (10, 10, 10, 10, 10)	Dance-off	"Take Me to Church" - Hozier	Runner-up

== Dance chart ==
- Week 1: 14 different dances (Cha-cha-cha, Bachata, Salsa, Tango, Samba, Waltz, Viennese Waltz, Foxtrot, Jive, Paso Doble, Argentine tango, Quickstep, Mambo, Rumba)
- Week 2: 7 different dances (Cha-cha-cha, Foxtrot, Jive, Argentine tango, Bachata, Paso Doble, Viennese Waltz)
- Week 3: 10 different dances (Paso Doble, Tango, Quickstep, Cha-cha-cha, Argentine tango, Mambo, Viennese Waltz, Foxtrot, Jive, Salsa)
- Week 4: Greek night (Freestyle)
- Week 5: Movie night (Quickstep, Viennese Waltz, Jive, Argentine tango, Paso Doble)
- Week 6: Duel night (Paso Doble, Salsa, Foxtrot, Mambo, Viennese Waltz)
- Week 7: Favorite song (Lambada, Contemporary, Paso Doble & Contemporary, Foxtrot, Bollywood, Merengue & Disco, Rumba)
- Week 8: 8 different dances (Salsa, Paso Doble, Quickstep, Mambo, Argentine tango, Cha-cha-cha, Bachata, Jive)
- Week 9: Freestyle & Christmas Swing Marathon (Christmas show)
- Week 10: 1st dance (Paso Doble, Samba, Quickstep, Viennese Waltz, Argentine tango, Rumba) & Freestyle
- Week 11: 4 different dances (Quickstep, Foxtrot, Samba, Viennese Waltz) & Instant Dance (Cha-cha-cha, Argentine tango, Quickstep, Jive)
- Week 12: 4 different dances (Paso Doble, Quickstep, Rumba, Samba) & Iconic dance night (Contemporary, Viennese Waltz, Paso Doble, Freestyle)
- Week 13: Semi-Finals (Solo & Trio challenge), Solo (Freestyle) & Trio challenge (Paso Doble, Argentine tango, Samba)
- Week 14: Finals (1st part: Quickstep, Tango), (2nd part: Cha-cha-cha) & Dance-off (Freestyle)

Couple	Week 1	Week 2	Week 3	Week 4	Week 5	Week 6	Week 7	Week 8	Week 9		Week 10		Week 11		Week 12		Week 13		Week 14		
Morfoula & Richard	Argentine tango	Cha-cha-cha	Viennese Waltz	Freestyle	Quickstep	Mambo	Paso Doble & Contemporary	Jive	Freestyle	Christmas; Swing; Marathon	Argentine tango	Freestyle	Samba	Instant Dance	Rumba	Freestyle	Freestyle	Argentine tango	Quickstep	Cha-cha-cha	Dance-off
Eirini & Konstantinos	Samba	Bachata	Tango	Freestyle	Jive	Foxtrot	Lambada	Cha-cha-cha	Freestyle	Christmas; Swing; Marathon	Samba	Freestyle	Viennese Waltz	Instant Dance	Paso Doble	Viennese Waltz	Freestyle	Samba	Tango	Cha-cha-cha	Dance-off
Nikoleta & Thodoris	Cha-cha-cha	Argentine tango	Salsa	Freestyle	Viennese Waltz	Paso Doble	Rumba	Quickstep	Freestyle	Christmas; Swing; Marathon	Cha-cha-cha	Freestyle	Foxtrot	Instant Dance	Samba	Paso Doble	Freestyle	Paso Doble	Cha-cha-cha		
Theoxaris & Anastasia	Paso Doble	Argentine tango	Jive	Freestyle	Viennese Waltz	Foxtrot	Contemporary	Bachata	Freestyle	Christmas; Swing; Marathon	Paso Doble	Freestyle	Unknown	Instant Dance	Quickstep	Contemporary			Paso Doble		
Niki & Dionisis	Rumba	Viennese Waltz	Cha-cha-cha	Freestyle	Argentine tango	Salsa	Contemporary	Paso Doble	Freestyle	Christmas; Swing; Marathon	Rumba	Freestyle	Quickstep	Instant Dance					Freestyle		
Christos & Maria	Quickstep	Jive	Argentine tango	Freestyle	Viennese Waltz	Paso Doble	Contemporary	Salsa	Freestyle	Christmas; Swing; Marathon	Quickstep	Freestyle	Unknown	Instant Dance	-	-					
Fanis & Tzeni	Viennese Waltz	Bachata	Foxtrot	Freestyle	Paso Doble	Mambo	Merengue & Disco	Quickstep	Freestyle	Christmas; Swing; Marathon	Viennese Waltz	Freestyle							Bachata		
Maria & Paulos	Foxtrot	Cha-cha-cha	Quickstep	Freestyle	Jive	Salsa	Bollywood	Argentine tango	Freestyle	Christmas; Swing; Marathon									Jive		
Thanos & Claudia-Anna	Tango	Jive	Paso Doble	Freestyle	Quickstep	Viennese Waltz	Foxtrot	Mambo											Freestyle		
Thanasis & Evi	Jive	Foxtrot	Mambo	Freestyle	Quickstep	Viennese Waltz															
Elisavet & Elias	Salsa	Cha-cha-cha	Viennese Waltz	Freestyle	Paso Doble																
Christina & Gaetano	Mambo	Foxtrot	Cha-cha-cha	Freestyle																	
Thalia & Vladimir	Waltz	Paso Doble	Cha-cha-cha																Paso Doble		
Triantafyllos & Fotini	Bachata	Paso Doble																	Bachata		

Highest scoring dance
Lowest scoring dance
Danced, but not scored
Eliminated for this week
Returning for the bottom two
Withdrew from the competition
Gained bonus points for this dance
Highest score of the week and won immunity for next week
Not danced

== Guest performances ==
Date	Dance style	Artist(s)/Group(s)	Song(s)	Dancers/Guests
16 November 2014	Cha-cha-cha	Boys + Noise	"Mazi Sou Boro"	
16 November 2014	-	Boys + Noise	"Eho Esena"	
30 November 2014	-	"Tha perasei ki ayto, Musical"	"Kokoriko" "To Feggari Panothe Mou" "Mambo" "Tosa Kalokairia" "Kante Ypomoni"	Mirka Papakonstantinou, Tania Trypi, Antonis Loudaros; Michalis Marinos & Memos Mpegnis
14 December 2014	Freestyle	Various Artists	"Lucio Battisti"	Fay Skorda, Elias Boutsis, Giannis Tserkinis, Alexandros Papadopoulos; Sergey & Dead Prez
21 December 2014	Contemporary	Paidiki chorodia Spirou Lamprou		Konstantinos Papazoglou & professional dancers
28 December 2014	Αcrobatics	"China Queen"	Instrumental	China Queen's dancers
28 December 2014	-	"H Melodia tis Eyftixias, Musical"	Instrumental	Nadia Kontogeorgi, Akis Sakellariou, Zeta Douka, Argiris Aggelou & Musical's actors
11 January 2015	Rumba & Contemporary	Elisa	"Dancing"	Mary Sinatsaki & Yuri Dimitrov
18 January 2015	Argentine tango	"Dance Secret, show"	"El Tango de Roxanne"	Dance Secret's dancers
18 January 2015	Freestyle	Katerina Stikoudi	"Tatouaz"	Katerina Stikoudi, Paulos Manogiannakis & professional dancers
18 January 2015	Burlesque	Catherine Zeta-Jones & Cell Block's girls	"Cell Block Tango"	Natalia Germanou, Claudia-Anna Stoyia & professional dancers
1 February 2015	Freestyle	Isaias Matiamba	"Dynata"	Isaias Matiamba & Maria Antimisari

== Ratings ==
Show	Episode	Air date	Official ratings (in millions)	Daily rank	Weekly rank	Rating/share (adults 15–44)	Rating/share (household)	Source
1	Week 1	26 October 2014	0.961	1	12	23.3%	26.5%	
2	Week 2	2 November 2014	1.067	1	9	21.8%	28.0%	
3	Week 3	9 November 2014	0.940	2	14	22.0%	25.6%	
4	Week 4: Greek night	16 November 2014	1.082	2	11	22.7%	26.1%	
5	Week 5: Movie night	23 November 2014	1.055	2	12	22.6%	26.1%	
6	Week 6: Duel night	30 November 2014	1.039	2	17	22.8%	26.1%	
7	Week 7: Favorite Song	7 December 2014	0.846	3	33	15.7%	20.9%	
8	Week 8	14 December 2014	1.018	2	28	20.4%	23.5%	
9	Week 9: Christmas show	21 December 2014	1.072	1	12	21.6%	26.8%	
10	Week 10: New Year's Eve show	28 December 2014	1.085	1	4	21.7%	26.4%	
11	Week 11	4 January 2015	1.171	1	7	20.8 %	27.4 %	
12	Week 12: Iconic dance night	11 January 2015	1.195	1	7	23.8 %	29.0 %	
13	Week 13: Semi-Finals	18 January 2015	1.347	1	8	25.3%	30.7%	
14	Week 14: Finals	1 February 2015	1.229	1	11	28.5%	28.5 &	
Averages				2	13	22.36 %	26.54%	
