= Natalia Germanou =

Natalia Germanou Ναταλία Γερμανού
- Born: Athens, Greece
- Genres: Modern laika, pop, dance
- Occupations: Songwriter, radio producer, television hostess, DJ
- Years active: 1986–present
- Website: www.natalia.gr

Natalia Germanou (Greek: Ναταλία Γερμανού) is a Greek songwriter, television hostess, radio producer and journalist.

Germanou has written lyrics for many popular singers such as Anna Vissi, Despina Vandi, Mihalis Hatzigiannis, Notis Sfakianakis, Natasa Theodoridou, Labis Livieratos, Katy Garbi and many more. She co-wrote with Dantis the lyrics to Elena Paparizou's My Number One, the winning entry of the Eurovision Song Contest 2005. She also wrote a Greek song for Armenian singer Sirusho, called Erotas. She has hosted a radio show on Sfera FM during the 2020s as well as having hosted or taken part in numerous reality and talk shows, currently on ANT1 TV network.

== Biography ==
Germanou was born in Athens. Her father is the late Freddy Germanos, a popular journalist and author, and her mother Erietta Mavroudi. For 12 years, Germanou attended the "Mina Aidonopoulou" school, where she got good grades and was good in Math. At the age of 16, Germanou announced to her family that she would like to become an actress, to which her Father suggested journalism instead.

A few years later, Germanou finished a professional journalism school in Athens, and was soon accepted to the Orlando campus of University of Central Florida where she planned to live for the next 5 years, perfecting her study in journalism. About a month and a half before her planned departure to college, Germanou got a job offer to work at the magazine "Ena" owned by Giorgos Koskotas, and managed by Pavlos Bakogiannis. Germanou, with the guidance of her father, accepted, and stayed in Athens, where for the next 4 years, got experience working for the magazines "Ena" and "Kai" and the newspaper "24 Ores".

In October 1988, at age 23, Germanou started hosting a radio show along with Prokopis Doukas titled "Club Sandwich" on "SKY 100,4". A year later in 1990, Germanou started working with Ant1 Channel and moved her radio show to their radio stations, and started a spin-off musical show of the same name on the channel. At the same time, in 1990, Germanou branched out to writing lyrics, and has since written lyrics for many big Greek singers, with more than 250 songs, and more than 30 platinum and 45 gold records.

For the next 4 years, Germanou continued hosting. "Club Sandwich" later became "Blue Jean", and was broadcast daily on the radio station "Athina 9.84", where she also became a radio producer. At the same time, Germanou started hosting the music show "Mega Star" on Mega Channel, which she continued to host for 10 years. A couple of years later in 1997, Germanou became the programing director and radio producer at the radio station "Sfera 102.2", where she still hosts a radio show today.

In 2002, Germanou hosted the first season of Fame Story, and was later a judge on music related reality shows such as Dream Show 1 and 2, Fame Story 3 and Sound Mix Show. In 2005, Germanou co-wrote the lyrics to the song "My Number One", which won the Eurovision Song Contest 2005". In 2007-2008, she was a judge on the music reality show "TV Stars Parousiaste" on Alpha TV alongside Ilias Psinakis, while she hosted the show "Randevou sta tifla" every Saturday night on Alpha Channel in the same year.

Germanou hosted the morning show "Mes Tin Kali Hara" on Alpha TV and the evening show Chart Show:Your Countdown every Sunday, on the same TV channel.

== Personal life ==
Natalia Germanou married singer Petros Imvrios in October 1998. In 2002 they divorced.

== Production discography ==
The beginning of Germanou's songwriting career is marked by the song "Pos" released in 1990 and sung by Mando. Since then she has written the lyrics to over 250 songs for various artists, with over 30 albums her songs have been included on going Platinum, and over 45 albums going Gold.

== Shows ==
Below are select shows Germanou has been a part of:

=== Hosting ===
==== Radio ====
- 1988-1990 - "Club Sandwich" (SKY FM)
- 1990-1994 - "Club Sandwich" (ANT1 FM)
- 1994-1997 - "Blue Jean" (Athina 9.84)
- 1997–present - "Natalia Germanou" (Sfera FM)

==== Television ====
- 1990-1992 - "Club Sandwich (Ant1 TV)
- 1992-2002 - "Mega Star" (Mega Channel)
- 2001-2002 - "Den To Pistevo (Mega Channel)
- 2002-2003 - "Fame Story 1 (Ant1 TV)
- 2005 - "Figame!" (Ant1 TV)
- 2006-2007 - "Sound Mix Show" (Alpha TV)
- 2007-2008 - "Rantevou Sta Tifla" (Alpha TV)
- 2008–2013 - "Mes Stin Kali Hara" (Alpha TV)
- 2009–2012 - "Chart Show: Your Countdown" (Alpha TV)
- 2013-2014 - "I Germanou Ksanarxetai" (Ant1 TV)
- 2014-2015 - "Mi xanomaste" (E Channel)
- 2015-2016 - "Namaste" (E Channel)
- 2016-2018 - "Epitelous Savvatokyriako" (E Channel)
- 2018–present - "Kalytera de Ginetai" (Alpha TV)

=== Judging ===
- 2005-2006 - "Fame Story 3" (Ant1 Channel)
- 2005 - "Dream Show 1" (Alpha Channel)
- 2007 - "Dream Show 2" (Alpha Channel)
- 2007-2008 - "TV Star Parousiaste" (Alpha Channel)
- 2017 - Star Academy (E Channel)
- 2018 - Dancing with the Stars (Ant1 Channel) (Season 6 Guest judge, Live 6)

=== Acting ===
Germanou has also appeared in several guest star rolls on various TV shows over the years. Germanou appeared on 2 episodes of "Hai-Rok", which her close friend Eleni Mavili was a writer on, as well as on the shows "Oi Stavloi Tis Eriettas Zaimi", To Kokkino Domatio and "Kinoumeni Ammos". Germanou also appeared on an episode of Anna Vissi's short lived variety show Me Agapi Anna on Ant1 Channel in the mid 1990s, where she sang along with Vissi.

== Filmography ==
=== Television ===
Year	Title	Role(s)	Notes
1990-1992	Club Sandwich	Herself (host)	Music talk show
1992-1993	Annual Pop Corn Music Awards	Herself (host)	TV special
1992-2001	Mega Star with Natalia Germanou	Herself (host)	Saturday talk show on Mega Channel; also co-creator
1993-1994	Hi Rock	Desire Pothoula	5 episodes
1996-1997	Annual Pop Corn Music Awards	Herself (host)	TV special
2001-2002	Den to pistevo with Natalia Germanou!	Herself (host)	Talk show on Mega Channel
2002-2003	Fame Story	Herself (host)	Reality show; season 1
2003	The stables of Erieta Zaimi	Herself	2 episodes
2004	So let's go with Natalia Germanou	Herself (host)	Talk show on ANT1; also creator
2004-2005	Fame Story	Herself (judge)	Reality show; season 3
2005-2007	Dream Show: The Music	Herself (judge)	Reality show; season 2-3
2006	Kinoumeni Ammos	Herself	5 episodes
2006-2007	Soundmix Show	Herself (host)	Talent show
2007	The Red Suite	Herself	Episode: "Alexis Story"
2007-2008	TV Stars: Let's present yourselves	Herself (judge)	Talent show
2007-2008	Blind Date with Natalia Germanou	Herself (host)	Daytime game show; season 8
2008	Coffee with Eleni Menegaki	Herself (guest host)	30 episodes
2008-2013	In a really good mood with Natalia Germanou	Herself (host)	Weekend talk show on Alpha TV
2009-2012	Chart Show - Your Countdown	Herself (host)	Sunday talk show; season 1-3
2012	Johnnie Walker Man of the Year Cyprus	Herself (host)	TV special
2013-2014	Germanou is back	Herself (host)	Talk show on ANT1; also co-creator
2014-2015	Keep in touch with Natalia Germanou	Herself (host)	Saturday talk show on Epsilon TV; also co-creator
2015-2016	Nameste with Natalia Germanou	Herself (host)	Daytime talk show on Epsilon TV
2016-2018	Finally Weekend with Natalia Germanou	Herself (host)	Weekend talk show on Epsilon TV
2017	Star Academy	Herself (judge)	Reality show; season 5
2018	Dancing with the Stars	Herself (guest judge)	Live 6; season 6
2018–today	As Good as It Gets! with Natalia Germanou	Herself (host)	Weekend talk show on Alpha TV; also creator
2019	Your Face Sounds Familiar	Herself (guest judge)	Episode 11; season 5
2020-2021	Don't start moaning	Noni Karakaedoni	3 episodes
2021	Aggeliki: Behind the cameras	Herself (host)	TV special; also co-creator
2021	Just the 2 Of Us	Herself (guest judge)	Semifinal; season 5
2023-2024	The Secret Song with Natalia Germanou	Herself (host)	Variety talk show
