= Tatiana Stefanidou =

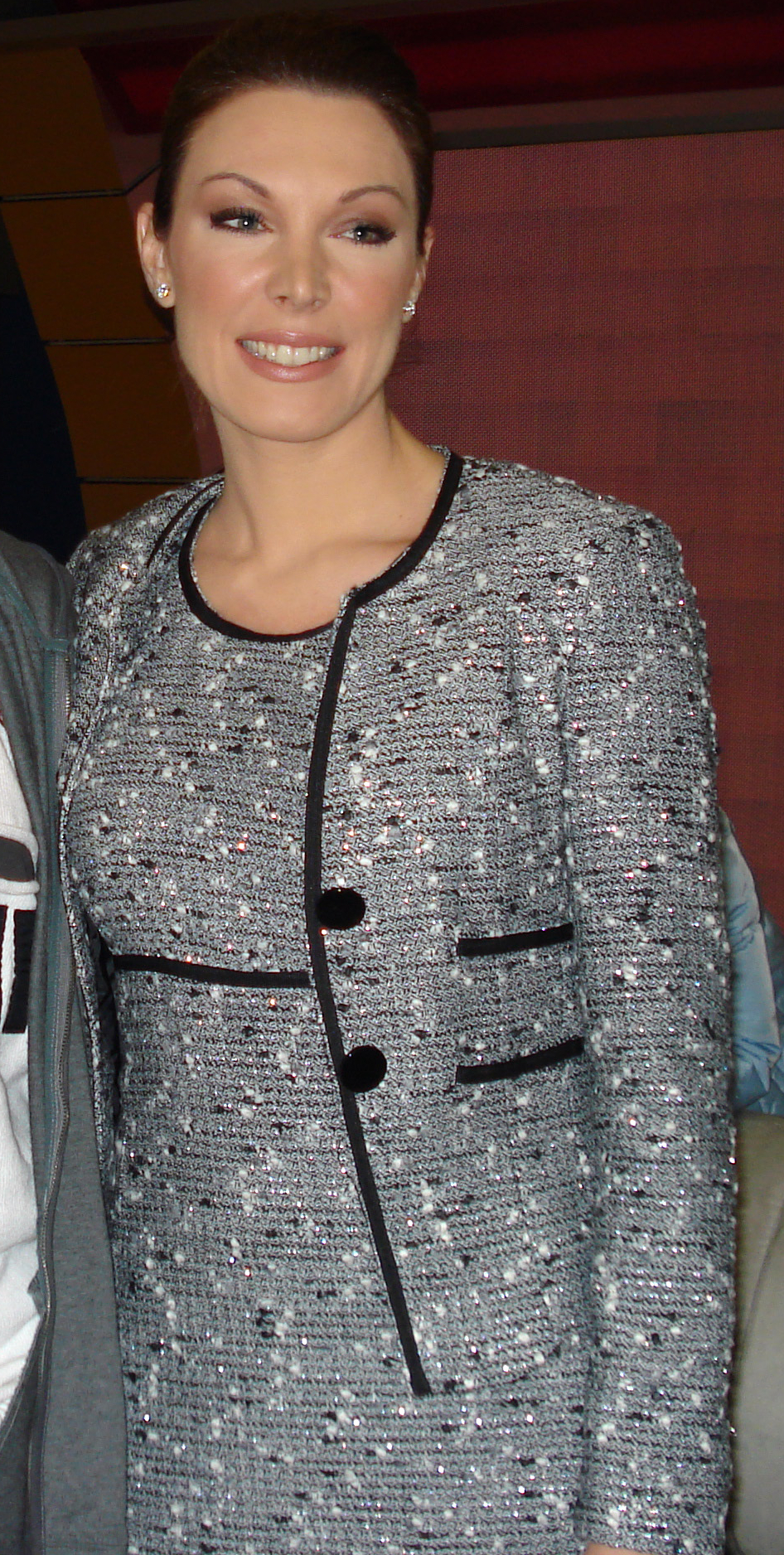
- Tatiana Stefanidou in January 2007
- Occupations: Television host, Journalist

Tatiana Stefanidou (Greek: Τατιάνα Στεφανίδου; born 18 April 1970 in Athens) is a Greek television host and journalist on Greek television.

== Career ==
In July 2010, it was announced that Stefanidou had signed with Star Channel to present a daily show. The shows were 3 and called "Mila", "Mia" and Axizi na to Zeis".

== Filmography ==
=== Television ===
Year	Title	Role(s)	Notes
1993–1994	ET1 Evening News	Herself (anchor)	Daily afternoon news on ET1
1994–1996	Goodmorning Greece	Herself (co-host)	Daytime morning show; season 4–5
1994–1999	ANT1 News	Herself (anchor)	Daily central news on ANT1
1998	If only with Tatiana Stefanidou	Herself (host)	Talk show
2000–2001	New Day with Tatiana Stefanidou	Herself (host)	Daytime morning show
2001–2002	Glass Wall with Tatiana Stefanidou	Herself (host)	Daytime tabloid talk show; also creator
2002	The stables of Erieta Zaimi	Herself	1 episode
2002–2003	Tear Apart with Tatiana Stefanidou	Herself (host)	Daytime tabloid talk show; also creator
2003	Handle with kid gloves with Tatiana Stefanidou	Herself (host)	Daytime tabloid talk show; also creator
2003–2004	Exclusively with Tatiana Stefanidou	Herself (host)	Daytime tabloid talk show; also creator
2004–2005	Fame Story	Herself (host)	Reality television; season 3
2004–2006	Apocalypse Now with Tatiana Stefanidou	Herself (host)	Daytime tabloid talk show; also creator
2005	Big Brother: Big Mother	Herself (host)	Reality television; season 4
2006–2008	National Beauty Pageant of Greece	Herself (host)	TV special
2006–2010	It's worth seeing it with Tatiana Stefanidou	Herself (host)	Daytime talk show; also creator
2010–2011	It's worth living it with Tatiana Stefanidou	Herself (host)	Daytime talk show; also creator
2011	My name is Vangelis	Herself	1 episode
2011–2014	Talk with Tatiana Stefanidou	Herself (host)	Daytime talk show on STAR; also co-creator
2014–2015	One with Tatiana Stefanidou	Herself (host)	Daytime talk show on STAR
2015–2018	Tatiana Live	Herself (host)	Daytime talk show; also creator
2018	Dancing with the Stars	Herself (guest judge)	Live 9; season 6
2018	My Style Rocks	Herself (guest judge)	Gala 14; season 2
2018–2020	Together with Tatiana Stefanidou	Herself (host)	Daytime talk show; also creator
2020–2024	TLive with Tatiana Stefanidou	Herself (host)	Daytime tabloid talk show
2025	Power Talk with Tatiana Stefanidou	Herself (host)	Daytime talk show; also creator
