= Nikos Mihas =

- Born: Nikolaos; 20 November 1979 (age 46); Athens, Greece
- Origin: Athens, Greece
- Genres: Rock, Pop rock, Alternative rock
- Occupations: Singer, guitarist, songwriter, doctor
- Instruments: Vocals, guitar
- Years active: 1989–present
- Labels: Heaven Music, Sony Music Greece
- Website: http://www.nikosmihas.com

Nikos Mihas (Greek: Νίκος Μίχας; born 20 November 1979, in Athens, Greece) is a Greek singer-songwriter of the new age of Greek rock stars.

== Early life ==
From an early age he showed an interest in music. He started by playing the piano at the age of 10 and a few years later he formed a band with his brother and some friends. The band was called "NIMA" (derived from the first letters of their names, NIkos-MAkis). Some years later he went to Romania to study Medicine and become a doctor. He never left his dream however, which was to become a singer, so he entered the TV talent show "Fame Story 2".

== Fame Story (2004) ==
In 2004, he decided to take part in the talent show "Fame Story 2", shown on the Greek TV channel ANT1, where he was one of the favourites to make it to the finals due to his unique style of performing and his low-profile character. One week before the final, however, he was eliminated from the show but for the first time in a Greek talent show he performed a song that he wrote; a move that many other contestants followed in the years to come. "Party" was a huge success at the time, even without being physically released in the music market.

=== Songs performed on Fame Story ===
Week	Song	Performed With	Result
Intro (March 14)	"The One I Love" by R.E.M.	-	Safe
1 (March 21)	"Koita Me Anteho" by Iro	Apostolia Gouti, Klara Myroforidou	Safe
2 (March 28)	"Ekrypsa To Prosopo Mou" by Antonis Remos	Kostas Kountos	Bottom 2
3 (April 4)	"Asimenia Sfika" by Ypogeia Revmata	-	Safe
4 (April 11)	"Not in Love" by Enrique Iglesias	Apostolia Gouti	Safe
5 (April 18)	"Notos" by Lavrentis Machairitsas & Babis Stokas	Kostas Karafotis	Safe
6 (April 25)	"Just Like a Pill" by Pink	Rallia Hristidou	Safe
7 (May 2)	"I Malamo" by Alkistis Protopsalti	Natassa Zenetzi	Safe
8 (May 9)	"Rock Ballanda" by Antonis Vardis & Haris Alexiou	Apostolia Gouti	Safe
9 (May 16)	"Paei Ligos Kairos" by Giannis Ploutarhos	Giorgos Hristou	Safe
10 (May 23)	"To Gucci Ton Masai" by Giorgos Mazonakis & Elli Kokkinou	Kalomoira	Safe
11 (May 30)	"Me and My Monkey" by Robbie Williams	-	Safe
12 (June 6)	"Pride (In the Name of Love)" by U2	-	Bottom 2
13 (June 13)	"Party"	-	Eliminated

== Professional career (2005–) ==
A year after, in the summer of 2005, he saw the release of his first personal album. It was called "Sti Hora Tou Pote" ("Into Neverland") and included many major hit-singles. It contains 12 songs written mostly by him and his band and with contributions of other songwriters.

In March 2007 his second album "Trehei Tipota?" was released. It contains 12 songs in a rock-alternative style including some beautiful ballads. The album also contains a cover of the 3 Doors Down song "When I'm Gone" in Greek lyrics. The record has received mixed reviews from Greek critics.

He is currently in progress of releasing his third album.

In early 2010, "Poso Sou Moiazo" was released as a digital single and video.

== Discography ==
=== Studio albums ===
- Sti Hora Tou Pote – "Στη Χώρα Του Ποτέ" (2005)
- Trehei Tipota? – "Τρέχει Τίποτα" (2007)
- Stigmes – "Στιγμές" (2016)

=== Singles&LP ===
- Ekeini – "Εκείνη" (2018)
- Dos' Mou Anaptira – "Δωσ' Μου Αναπτήρα" (2020)

=== Music videos ===
- Party
- Simadia Kairou
- Hronia Kathreftes
- Mpou***lo
- Ta Paidia Ton Balkonion
- Poso Sou Moiazo

== Awards ==
=== MAD Video Music Awards ===
The MAD Video Music Awards are awarded annually by the Greek music channel MAD TV since 2004. Nikos Mihas has received 2 awards from 5 nominations.

Year	Nominee / work	Award	Result
2006	"Party"	Best Video Rock	Nominated
2006	"Party"	Best New Artist Video	Nominated
2008	"Mpou***lo"	Best Video Rock	Won
2008	"Mpou***lo"	Sexiest Video	Won
2009	"Ta Paidia Ton Mpalkonion"	Best Video Rock	Nominated
