= Just the 2 of Us (Greek TV series) season 5 =

Just the 2 of Us
- Season 5
- Hosted by: Nikos Koklonis; Katerina Stikoudi (Backstage)
- Judges: Despina Vandi; Maria Bakodimou; Stamatis Fasoulis; Vicky Stavropoulou

Release
- Original network: Alpha TV
- Original release: September 25, 2021 – January 1, 2022

Season chronology
- ← Previous; Season 4

The fifth season of the Greek reality show Just the 2 of Us began airing on September 25, 2021, on Alpha TV, for the first time.

From the previous season, main host Nikos Koklonis and the judges Despina Vandi, Maria Bakodimou, Stamatis Fasoulis and Vicky Stavropoulou, all returned. The backstage host from the previous season, Laura Karaiskou didn't return and her place was taken by a contestant from the first season of the show, Katerina Stikoudi.

It was revealed that season five would have 14 contestants.

== Judges ==
- Despina Vandi, singer, actress.
- Maria Bakodimou, television presenter.
- Stamatis Fasoulis, actor.
- Vicky Stavropoulou, actress.

== Couples ==
Celebrity	Occupation	Professional singer	Status
Dimosthenis Tzoumanis	TV Personality, Model, Real Estate Agent	Giota Griva	Eliminated 1st on October 9, 2021
Costas Fragolias	Model, TV Presenter	Mando	Eliminated 2nd on October 16, 2021
Eleni Voulgaraki	TV Presenter, Radio producer	Konstantinos Pantelidis	Eliminated 3rd on October 23, 2021
Sasa Stamati	Journalist, TV Presenter	Themis Adamantidis	Eliminated 4th on October 30, 2021
Dimitris Alexandrou	Model, TV presenter	Kelly Kelekidou; Eleni Hatzidou (week 3)	Eliminated 5th on November 6, 2021
Piyi Devetzi	Olympic athlete	Thanos Petrelis	Eliminated 6th on November 13, 2021
Mara Meimaridi	Author, Living Consultant	Stan	Eliminated 7th on November 20, 2021
Marina Patouli	Politician, Living Consultant	Stelios Dionisiou	Eliminated 8th on November 27, 2021
Super Kiki	Stand-up comedian	George Velissaris	Eliminated 9th on December 4, 2021
Alexandra Panagiotarou	Model, Businessman	Katerina Lioliou	
Anna-Maria Psycharaki	TV Personality, Lawyer	Harry Varthakouris	
Ioanna Touni	Model, Influencer	Nikiforos	
James Kafetzis	TV Personality, Businessman	Irini Papadopoulou	
Marinos Konsolos	Actor	Eleni Dimou	
Nikos Barkoulis	TikToker	Evelina Nikoliza	

== Scoring chart ==
Couple	Place	Week													
Couple	Place	2	3	4	5	6	7	8	9	10	11	12	13	14	15
Alexandra & Katerina		30	31	38	36	40									
Anna-Maria & Harry		27	28	39	34	37									
Dimitris & Kelly		—	24	26	28	32									
Ioanna & Nikiforos		—	31	29	35	37									
James & Irini		26	26	26	28	28									
Mara & Stan		32	26	31	32	21									
Marina & Stelios		Not in the game													
Marinos & Eleni		—	—	38	39	38									
Nikos & Evelina		—	32	32	33	31									
Piyi & Thanos		26	29	27	30	31									
Super Kiki & George		24	31	33	38	37									
Sasa & Themis	12	22	28	28	35	25									
Eleni & Konstantinos	13	22	24	28	32										
Costas & Mando	14	29	31	36											
Dimosthenis & Giota	15	27	24												

Red numbers indicate the lowest score for each week
Green numbers indicate the highest score for each week
the couple eliminated that week
the returning couple finishing in the bottom two/three
indicates the couple which was immune from elimination
indicates the couple that didn't perform due to personal reasons
the winning couple
the runner-up couple
the third-place couple

=== Average score chart ===
This table only counts for performances scored on a traditional 40-points scale.

Rank by average	Place	Couple	Total points	Number of performances	Average
1		Alexandra & Katerina	135	4	33.8
2		Nikos & Evelina	97	3	32.3
3	14	Costas & Mando	96	3	32.0
3		Anna-Maria & Harry	128	4	32.0
5		Ioanna & Nikiforos	95	3	31.7
6		Super Kiki & George	126	4	31.5
7		Mara & Stan	121	4	30.3
8		Sasa & Themis	113	4	28.3
9		Piyi & Thanos	112	4	28.0
10		James & Irini	106	4	26.5
10	13	Eleni & Konstantinos	106	4	26.5
12		Dimitris & Kelly	78	3	26.0
13	15	Dimosthenis & Giota	51	2	25.5

== Weekly scores ==
=== Week 1: Launch show ===
- Musical guest: Vasilis Karras

Order	Couple	Song
1	Costas & Mando	"Don't Start Now"
2	Nikos & Evelina	"Viktoria"
3	Dimitris & Kelly	"Lene"
4	James & Irini	"Spao ta Rologia"
5	Sasa & Themis	"Rixe sto kormi mou spirto"
6	Ioanna & Nikiforos	"Eisai"
7	Alexandra & Katerina	"Deja vu"
8	Marinos & Eleni	"To Dikio moy"
9	Super Kiki & George	"Karma"
10	Eleni & Konstantinos	"Vradia Aximerota"
11	Dimosthenis & Giota	"Paliopaido"
12	Mara & Stan	"Back to Black"
13	Piyi & Thanos	"Paradothika se Sena"
14	Anna-Maria & Harry	"S'agapao"

=== Week 2 ===
Due to a COVID-19 infection, Dimitris & Kelly, Ioanna & Nikiforos, Marinos & Eleni and Nikos & Evelina were unable to perform. Under the rules of the show, they were given a bye to the following week.

No elimination took place.

- Musical guest: Petros Iakovidis

Order	Couple	Song	Judge's Scores				Total
Order	Couple	Song	Vicky	Stamatis	Despina	Maria	Total
1	James & Irini	"Gia Sena"	7	6	6	7	26
2	Dimosthenis & Giota	"Taram Taram Tam"	7	7	7	6	27
3	Costas & Mando	"Chartopolemos"	7	7	7	8	29
4	Mara & Stan	"Ti Vradia mou Apopse"	8	8	8	8	32
5	Eleni & Konstantinos	"Proti Thesi"	6	5	5	6	22
6	Alexandra & Katerina	"Mata Hari"	8	7	8	7	30
7	Sasa & Themis	"Pia Thysia"	6	5	5	6	22
8	Piyi & Thanos	"Ap' to Vorra mexri to Noto"	7	6	6	7	26
9	Anna-Maria & Harry	"Echo Esena"	7	7	7	6	27
10	Super Kiki & George	"Val' to Terma"	6	6	5	7	24

=== Week 3 ===
Due to her ongoing COVID-19 infection, Kelly Kelekidou could not return as singer partner for Dimitris Alexandrou. His singer partner for the third week was Eleni Hatzidou. Also Marinos & Eleni were unable to perform. Under the rules of the show, they were given a bye to the following week.

- Musical guest: Themis Adamantidis

Order	Couple	Song	Judge's Scores				Total	Result
Order	Couple	Song	Vicky	Stamatis	Despina	Maria	Total	Result
1	Eleni & Konstantinos	"Se dyo mono Matia"	6	6	6	6	24	Safe
2	Nikos & Evelina	"Sti Diskotek"	8	8	8	8	32	Safe
3	Costas & Mando	"Perasmenes mou Agapes"	7	8	8	8	31	Safe
4	Alexandra & Katerina	"To Koritsaki sou"	8	7	8	8	31	Safe
5	Sasa & Themis	"Ena omorfo amaxi me dyo Aloga"	7	7	7	7	28	Safe
6	Piyi & Thanos	"Adonis"	8	7	7	7	29	Safe
7	James & Irini	"Tora arxizoun ta dyskola"	7	6	6	7	26	Safe
8	Mara & Stan	"Dov'è l'amore"	7	7	6	6	26	Bottom two
9	Super Kiki & George	"Anastatonomai"	8	8	8	7	31	Safe
10	Anna-Maria & Harry	"O Leyteris"	7	7	7	7	28	Safe
11	Ioanna & Nikiforos	"Ta matia sou Eroteytika"	8	8	8	7	31	Safe
12	Dimosthenis & Giota	"Dari Dari"	6	6	6	6	24	Eliminated
13	Dimitris & Eleni	"S' afapao sou Fonaxa"	6	6	6	6	24	Bottom three

=== Week 4 ===
Katerina Kainourgiou replaced Stikoudi in this episode, because of her pregnancy.

- Musical guest: Dionisis Shinas
- Musical guest: Katerina Stanisi

Order	Couple	Song	Judge's Scores				Total	Result
Order	Couple	Song	Vicky	Stamatis	Despina	Maria	Total	Result
1	Costas & Mando	"Adistrofi Metrisi"	9	9	9	9	36	Eliminated
2	Dimitris & Kelly	"Den Sou Kano Ton Agio"	7	6	6	7	26	Bottom two
3	Piyi & Thanos	"Me les Agapi"	7	6	6	8	27	Safe
4	Super Kiki & George	"O Andhras pou tha Pandrevto"	8	8	9	8	33	Safe
5	Alexandra & Katerina	"Lady Marmalade"	9	9	10	10	38	Safe
6	Eleni & Konstantinos	"Ti se pianei"	7	7	7	7	28	Bottom three
7	Ioanna & Nikiforos	"Tha Melagholiso"	8	7	8	6	29	Safe
8	Nikos & Evelina	"Banistirtzou"	8	7	8	9	32	Safe
9	Anna-Maria & Harry	"Orkisou"	10	10	10	9	39	Safe
10	James & Irini	"Fige"	7	6	6	7	26	Safe
11	Sasa & Themis	"Signomi Kirie, pios iste"	7	6	8	7	28	Safe
12	Mara & Stan	"Einai to stroma mou mono"	8	8	8	7	31	Safe
13	Marinos & Eleni	"Panselinos"	10	9	9	10	38	Safe

=== Week 5 ===
Katerina Kainourgiou replaced Stikoudi in this episode, because of her pregnancy.

- Musical guest: Stan
- Musical guest: Konstantinos Pantelidis
- Musical guest: Harry Varthakouris
- Musical guest: Eleni Dimou

Order	Couple	Song	Judge's Scores				Total	Result
Order	Couple	Song	Vicky	Stamatis	Despina	Maria	Total	Result
1	Eleni & Konstantinos	"Esy Eisai I Aitia Pou Ypofero"	8	8	8	8	32	Eliminated
2	Dimitris & Kelly	"Mi Girisis Xana"	7	7	7	7	28	Safe
3	Nikos & Evelina	"Ego"	9	8	8	8	33	Safe
4	Alexandra & Katerina	"Akrogialies Dilina"	9	8	10	9	36	Safe
5	Ioanna & Nikiforos	"Tatouaz"	9	9	9	8	35	Safe
6	Piyi & Thanos	"Zilevo"	8	7	8	7	30	Bottom three
7	James & Irini	"Ximeromata"	7	6	6	9	28	Bottom two
8	Super Kiki & George	"Ntiri Ntiri"	10	9	10	9	38	Safe
9	Mara & Stan	"Piga se Magisses"	8	8	8	8	32	Safe
10	Sasa & Themis	"Ta Matoklada Sou Lampoun"	9	8	9	9	35	Safe
11	Anna-Maria & Harry	"Mia Kokkini Grammi"	8	8	9	9	34	Safe
12	Marinos & Eleni	"Paliokairos"	9	10	10	10	39	Safe

=== Week 6 ===
- Musical guest: Nina Mazani
- Musical guest: Triantaphillos
- Musical guest: Antypas

Order	Couple	Song	Judge's Scores				Total	Result
Order	Couple	Song	Vicky	Stamatis	Despina	Maria	Total	Result
1	Dimitris & Kelly	"Ela Mou"	8	8	8	8	32	Safe
2	Piyi & Thanos	"Mexri to Telos tou Kosmou"	8	8	8	7	31	Bottom two
3	Nikos & Evelina	"Fila me Akoma"	8	7	7	9	31	Safe
4	James & Irini	"Senorita"	7	6	8	7	28	Safe
5	Marinos & Eleni	"Thelo Konta Sou Na Meino"	10	9	10	9	38	Safe
6	Super Kiki & George	"Einai gata"	9	9	10	9	37	Safe
7	Alexandra & Katerina	"Mou Aresoune T' Agoria"	10	10	10	10	40	Safe
8	Mara & Stan	"Na Tin Hairesai"	7	7	7	0	21	Bottom three
9	Anna-Maria & Harry	"Xana Mana"	9	9	10	9	37	Safe
10	Sasa & Themis	"To Kokkino Foustani"	7	6	6	6	25	Eliminated
11	Ioanna & Nikiforos	"Aeraki (To Thiliko)"	9	9	9	10	37	Safe

== Ratings ==
Episode		Date	Timeslot (EET)	Ratings	Viewers (in millions)	Rank		Share		Source
Episode		Date	Timeslot (EET)	Ratings	Viewers (in millions)	Daily	Weekly	Household	Adults 18-54	Source
1	"Week 1: Launch show"	September 25, 2021	Saturday 8:00pm	7.4%	0.768	#2	#13	24.1%	21.4%	
2	"Week 2"	October 2, 2021	Saturday 8:00pm	5.9%	0.615	#2	—N/a^{1}	16.9%	17.0%	
3	"Week 3"	October 9, 2021	Saturday 8:00pm	6.2%	0.637	#3	—N/a^{1}	16.5%	16.1%	
4	"Week 4"	October 16, 2021	Saturday 8:00pm	6.8%	0.707	#2	—N/a^{1}	19.2%	19.0%	
5	"Week 5"	October 23, 2021	Saturday 8:00pm	5.7%	0.594	#3	—N/a^{1}	16.0%	13.9%	
6	"Week 6"	October 30, 2021	Saturday 8:00pm	5.9%	0.611	#2	—N/a^{1}	16.1%	16.9%	
7	"Week 7"	November 6, 2021	Saturday 8:00pm	5.9%	0.609	#4	—N/a^{1}	15.8%	15.5%	
8	"Week 8"	November 13, 2021	Saturday 8:00pm	5.7%	0.586	#5	—N/a^{1}	15.3%	14.3%	
9	"Week 9"	November 20, 2021	Saturday 8:00pm	6.1%	0.628	#4	—N/a^{1}	16.4%	13.5%	
10	"Week 10"	November 27, 2021	Saturday 8:00pm	6.7%	0.697	#2	—N/a^{1}	17.7%	15.9%	
11	"Week 11"	December 4, 2021	Saturday 8:00pm	5.4%	0.560	#7	—N/a^{1}	14.4%	12.3%	
12	"Week 12"	December 11, 2021	Saturday 8:00pm	6.0%	0.624	#5	—N/a^{1}	15.6%	13.6%	
13	"Week 13"	December 18, 2021	Saturday 8:00pm	5.0%	0.522	#9	—N/a^{1}	13.0%	10.9%	
14	"Week 14"	December 25, 2021	Saturday 8:00pm	6.2%	0.644	#2	—N/a^{1}	17.7%	15.1%	
15	"Week 15: Final"	January 1, 2022	Saturday 8:00pm	8.7%	0.898	#1	#18	22.8%	19.8%	

Note

1. Outside top 20.
