= Nancy Alexiadi =

Nancy Alexiadi Νάνσυ Αλεξιάδη
- Born: Athens, Greece
- Origin: Greece
- Genres: Modern laika, pop, dance
- Years active: 2006–present
- Label: Heaven Music
- Website: www.nancyalexiadi.com

Nancy Alexiadi (Greek: Νάνσυ Αλεξιάδη) is a Greek singer and former contestant on Fame Story 3. She has released two albums, the most recent of which was released in October 2007. The music was written by Kostas Miliotakis, while the lyrics were written by Ilias Fillipou.

== Biography ==
She studied fashion and styling and at the age of 19 decided to become a singer since she loved music due to her father being a musician. She had worked with famous singers until October 2004 when she decided to enter the Fame Story Academy, the Greek Star Academy show. After leaving the show she released her debut CD "Xero Pia Eimai" in March 2006 which gave hits such as "Prospathw" and "Meine" and has been working along Christos Dantis, Nikos Kourkoulis and lately Nikos Vertis.

== Discography ==
=== Albums ===
- 2006: Xero Pia Eimai
- 2007: Afta Pou Eiha Oneireftei

=== Cover editions ===
- 2015: Oute Ta Lefta Sou

=== Singles & EPs ===
- 2012: Ena S'Agapo De Ftanei
- 2022: Mono Esi
