= Dionysis Makris =

- Born: Dionysis Sindrivanis; Thessaloniki, Greece
- Origin: Greece
- Genres: Modern laika, pop
- Years active: 2006–present
- Labels: Sony Music Greece, Universal Music Greece

Dionysis Makris (Greek: Διονύσης Μακρής) is a Greek singer of laiko music.

== Biography ==
In 2006, Makris released his first album titled Apolafsi. The lead single "Apolafsi" with its line "Itan I Zoi Mou Kolasi" (Was My Life Hell) charted well and became a dance floor hit. He also performed a duet with Kelly Kelekidou titled "Glyka Mou Kai Apolafsi Mou".

In 2007, he was a candidate to receive an "Arion Music Award", losing to Tamta.

In January 2008, Makris' new CD single "Mou Eipes Psemata was released and in the upcoming months, he will star in a new Greek television series.

== Discography ==
=== Studio albums ===
All the albums listed below were released in Greece.

Year	Title	Certification
2006	Apolafsi	-

=== CD singles ===
Year	Title	Certification
2008	Mou Eipes Psemata	-
