= Omega TV Cyprus =

First private television channel in Cyprus

Omega Channel
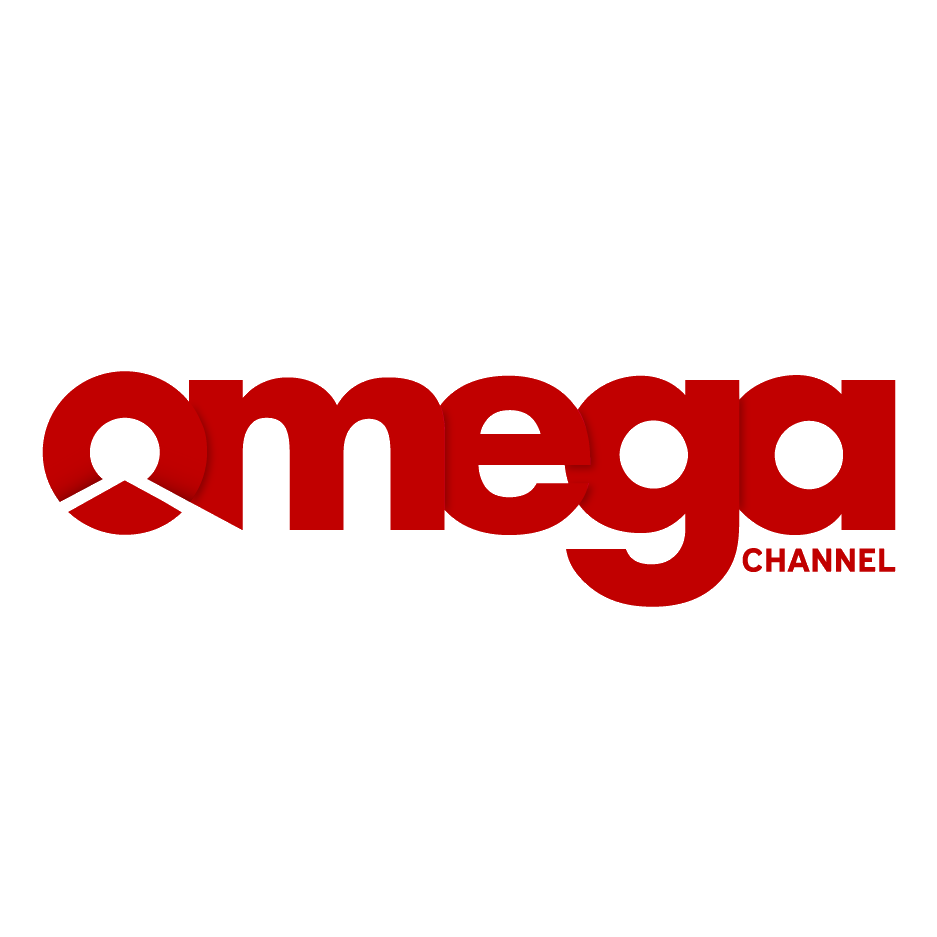
- Type: Broadcast television network
- Country: Cyprus
- Availability: National
- Owner: Information and Cultural Company "O Logos"; Omega Channel Limited
- Launch date: 25 October 2018 as Omega Channel; 4 September 2017 as TVOne; 18 October 2016 as MegaOne; 11 October 1999 as MEGA Channel (Cyprus); 26 April 1992 as O Logos
- Official website: Omega TV; Omega Live

Omega TV is a free to air terrestrial TV channel. It is the first private television channel established in Cyprus. Since the launch of the channel in 1992, it has been ‘dedicated to broadcasting high quality Cypriot and Greek programming.’ This includes kids programs as well as Church orientated programs. The channel also imports successful series from abroad and shows these in their original language with Greek subtitles.

Popular local programs include Ta Psarka, To Serial and Avlajhia. The Cypriot television channel has also broadcast successful series such as Gymnoi Aggeloi (Naked Angels) in 2010 and Oneiro Itan (It was a dream) in 2013 and also has long-standing agreements in place to broadcasting content from both Star Channel and Open TV in Greece.

== History ==
Initially known as O Logos (the word), the channel launched in 1992 under the auspices of the Church of Cyprus. In this phase, the channel censored scenes of nudity, homosexuality and swearing from the movies it bought. One of its successes was the broadcast of horse races. Many of the initial offers, including horse races and top-tier movies, were picked up later by subscription channel Lumiere TV as the channel was bought by MEGA Channel from Greece in 1999. The realignment didn't lead to the end of its collaboration with the Church of Cyprus, as the Church remained its main shareholder.

Following the closure of MEGA Channel in Greece, and due to payment evasion for the using of its name at Teletypos S.A., the owner of the channel, it was rebranded MEGAOne in September 2016, by then, the channel had an agreement with Star Channel. It also created its own news portal, TV One News.

== On Screen Branding ==
The channel originally launched in 1992 as O Logos (the word) and used this name for 7 years before the channel re-branding to MEGA in 1999.

From 1999 to 18 October 2016, the channel was known as MEGA Channel Cyprus and had the same branding and on-screen identity as the sister channel Mega Channel Greece. On 18 October 2016, the transitional MEGAOne brand was launched and was used until 4 September 2017 when the TVOne brand was introduced. On 25 October 2018 (3 days before Mega Channel Greece stopped television broadcasting), the channel renamed as OMEGA.

== OMEGA LIVE Portal ==
Omega have their own news portal called OMEGA LIVE which features news from Cyprus and the world as well as offering TV guides, live streaming and video on demand services. This portal launched in 2018 using the name TVONE NEWS (ex. LIVE NEWS) before later rebranding to OMEGA LIVE.

== Broadcasts ==
The station is located at Strovolos, Nicosia. It is broadcast on DVB-T all over Cyprus and is also carried on digital cable systems and via the internet.

== Logos ==
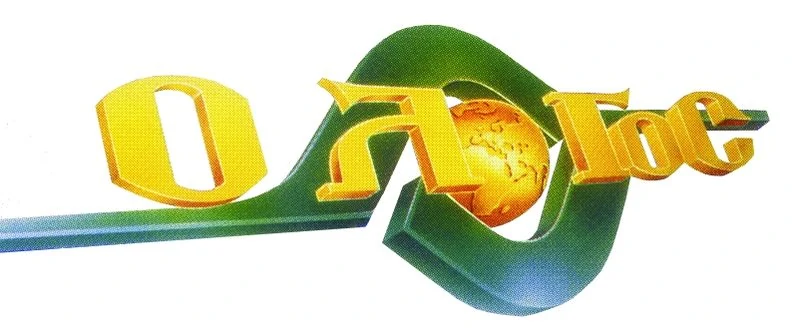
1991-01-29 – 1999-10-11

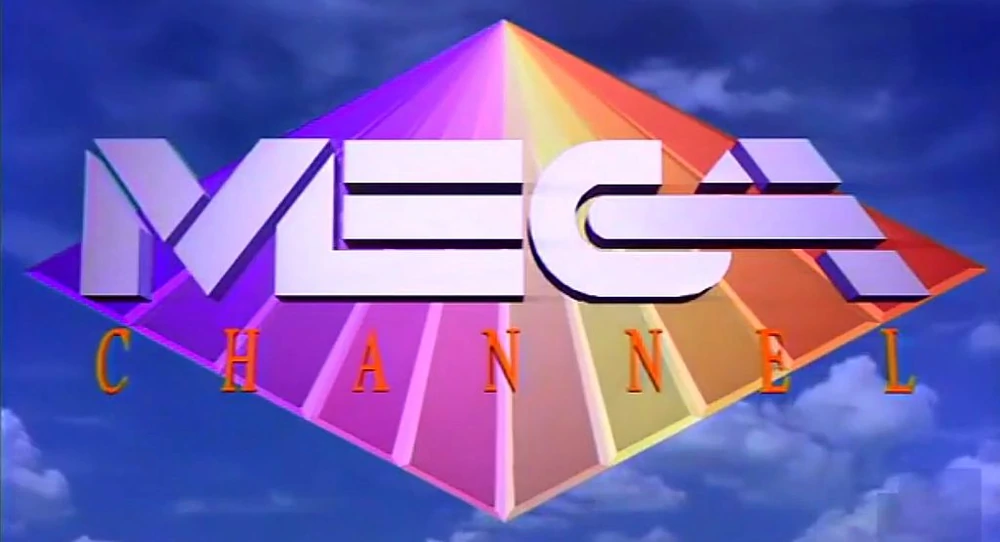
1999-10-11 – 1999-11-22

1999-11-22 – 2016-10-18

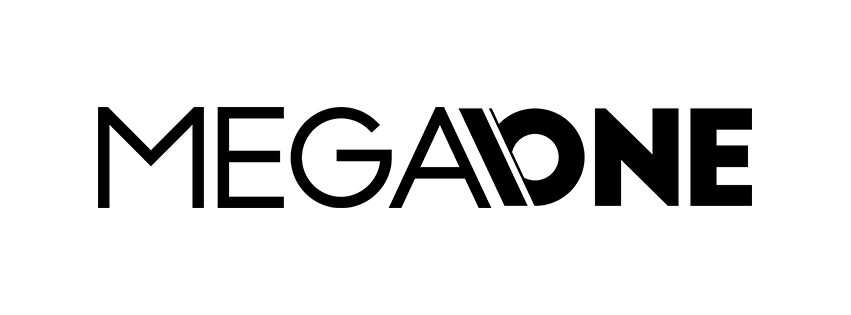
2016-10-18 – 2017-09-04

2017-09-04 – 2018-10-25

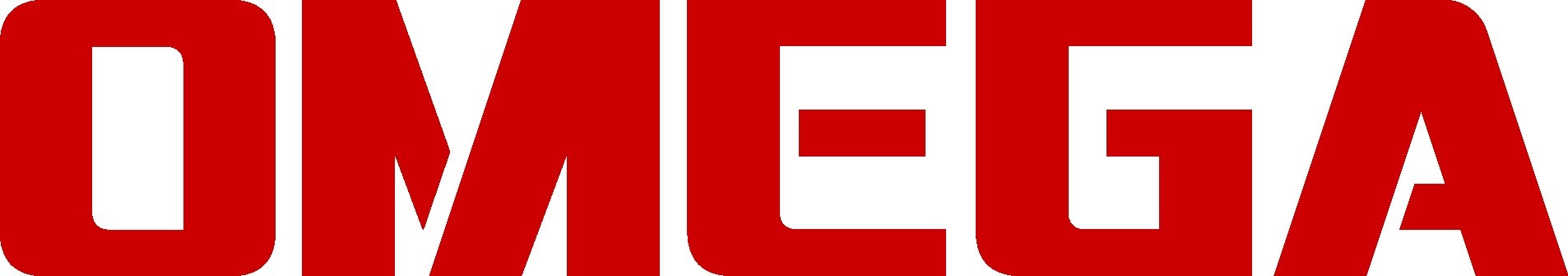
2018-10-25 – 2021-08-30

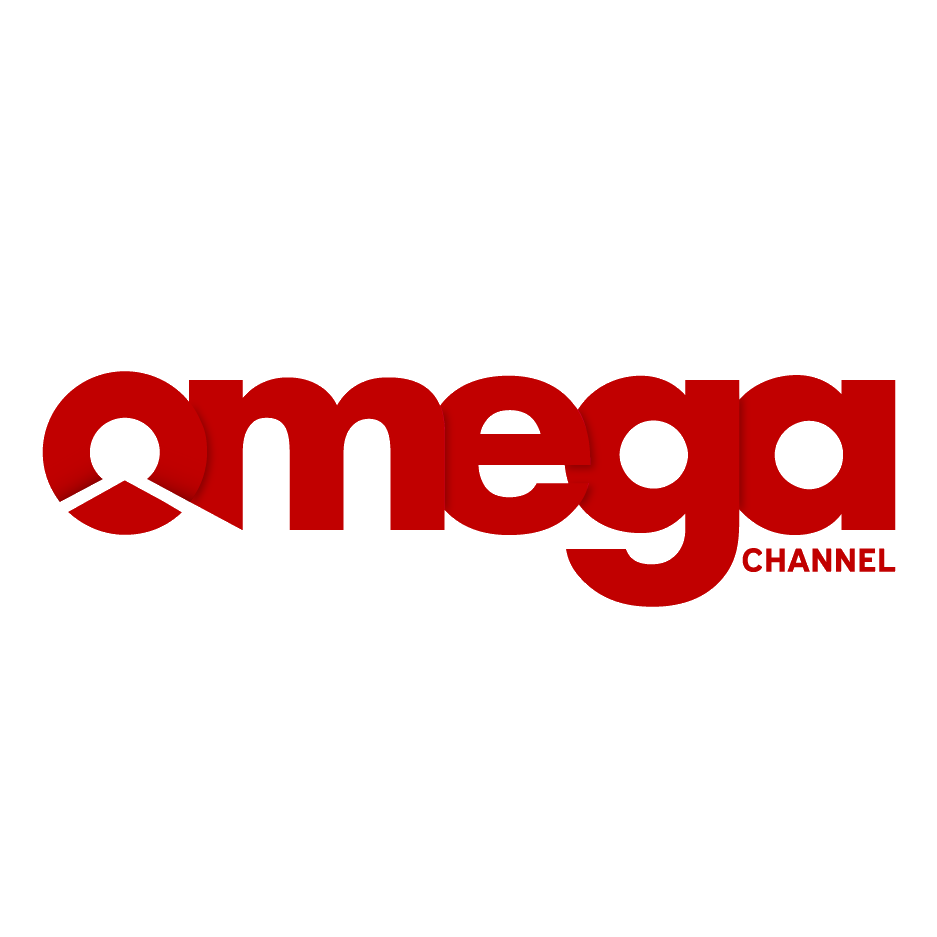
2021-08-30 – present
