= List of Tufts University people =

The list of Tufts University people includes alumni, professors, and administrators associated with Tufts University. For a list of Tufts' presidents, see List of presidents of Tufts University. It includes alumni and affiliates of the acquired Jackson College for Women and the School of the Museum of Fine Arts.

== Academics ==
=== College and university presidents ===
- Lawrence S. Bacow, president of Tufts University, 29th president of Harvard University
- Elmer Hewitt Capen (B.A. 1860), president of Tufts College member of the Massachusetts House of Representatives
- Leonard Carmichael (B.S. 1921), president of Tufts University and secretary of the Smithsonian Institution
- John Albert Cousens (B.A. 1903), president of Tufts College
- Oliver Dean, acting president of Tufts College between the terms of the first and second presidents; founder of Dean Academy
- Dan Ehrenkrantz (B.A. 1983), president of the Reconstructionist Rabbinical College and influential rabbi
- John E. Endicott, co-president of Woosong University and American foreign policy analyst specializing in security issues
- Hollis Godfrey (B.S. 1895), president of Drexel University
- Frederick W. Hamilton (B.A. 1880, M.A. 1886), president of Tufts College
- William Leslie Hooper, acting president of Tufts College between the terms of the fourth and fifth elected presidents
- John Clarence Lee (STD 1896), president of St. Lawrence University; president and vice president of Lombard University
- Moshe Many, Israeli urologist; president of Tel Aviv University, and president of Ashkelon Academic College
- Kathleen McCartney (B.S. 1977), president of Smith College and former dean of the Harvard Graduate School of Education
- George Stewart Miller, acting president of Tufts College
- Miriam E. Nelson, president of Hampshire College
- Joseph W. Polisi (M.A. 1970), president of The Juilliard School
- Albert J. Simone, president of Rochester Institute of Technology and the University of Hawaii system
- Katherine Haley Will (B.A. 1978), president of Gettysburg College and former chair of the Annapolis Group

=== Provosts, deans, and vice presidents ===
- Lisa Anderson (M.A.), provost of the American University in Cairo and Middle East political scholar
- Scott C. Beardsley, dean of the University of Virginia Darden School of Business
- John L. Carroll, dean of Samford University's Cumberland School of Law and former chief U.S. magistrate judge for the Middle District of Alabama
- David R. Harris, provost of Tufts, president of Union College
- David W. Kennedy (M.A.L.D. 1979), vice president of international affairs at Brown University and legal scholar
- David Rosowsky (B.S./M.S. 1987), vice president of University of Vermont, former dean of engineering of Rensselaer Polytechnic Institute
- Richard J. Smith (M.D./M.S., 1973), dean of the Graduate School of Arts & Sciences at Washington University in St. Louis
- Michelle Ann Williams (M.S. 1986), dean of the Harvard T.H. Chan School of Public Health

=== Professors and scholars ===
- Kuzhikalail M. Abraham (Ph.D. 1973), pioneer in lithium, lithium-ion, lithium-sulfur, and lithium-air batteries
- Saleem Ali (B.S 1994), Blue and Gold Distinguished Professor of Energy and Environment at the University of Delaware
- David Autor (B.A. 1989), economics professor at MIT focused on the effects of technology on the workplace
- Arnaud Blin, French historian and political scientist
- Martha Constantine-Paton (B.S. 1969), founding member of McGovern Institute for Brain Research at MIT
- Ram Dass (B.A. 1952), aka Richard Alpert, former Harvard psychology professor involved with the Harvard Psilocybin Project
- Robert Daum, director of the Iona Pacific Inter-Religious Centre at the Vancouver School of Theology
- Prachi Deshpande (Ph.D. 2002), historian and professor at Centre for Studies in Social Sciences, Calcutta
- Jay Famiglietti (B.S. 1982), professor of Earth System Science, University of California, Irvine
- Rolf Faste (M.S. 1971), industrial designer and professor at Stanford University
- Lewis M. Feldstein, co-chairman of the Saguaro Seminar and president of the New Hampshire Charitable Foundation
- Matt Glaser, former chair of the string department at the Berklee College of Music, jazz and bluegrass violinist
- Alan L. Gropman (Ph.D., 1975), professor of history and grand strategy, National Defense University
- Thomas L. Hopkins, progressive education professor and theorist
- Joi Ito, CEO of Creative Commons and former executive director of MIT Media Lab
- Robert Kayen (B.S. 1981), professor of civil engineering at University of California, Berkeley, previously University of California, Los Angeles
- Jill Lepore (B.A. 1987), historian and professor at Harvard University
- Julie Livingston, one of thirty-four "genius" MacArthur Fellows in 2013, for her research at Rutgers University
- Mahmood Mamdani (M.A. 1968, M.A.L.D. 1969), African political expert and professor at Columbia University
- Frederick Nelson (B.S. 1954), mechanical engineer and professor
- Padraig O'Malley, professor of international studies specializing in the problems of divided societies
- Martin Theodore Orne, psychiatry and psychology professor and researcher
- Elizabeth Stordeur Pryor (B.A., 1989), historian and professor at Smith College
- Eric Rubin (M.D./Ph.D. 1990), chair, Department of Immunology and Infectious Diseases, Harvard T.H. Chan School of Public Health
- Herbert Charles Sanborn (1873–1967), received a master's degree from Tufts College in 1897; chair of the Department of Philosophy and Psychology at Vanderbilt University 1921–1942
- Norman Wengert, political scientist and professor

== Art ==
- Marion Boyd Allen (attended 1902–1909), painter
- David Armstrong, photographer
- David Aronson, painter, sculptor; emeritus professor of art, Boston University
- Art School Cheerleaders, performance art troupe
- Will Barnet (attended 1928–1930), painter and printmaker
- Kaiju Big Battel, performance art troupe
- Carol Beckwith, photographer, author, and artist
- Ture Bengtz, painter/printmaker, teacher
- Frank Weston Benson (diploma, 1883), painter
- Seamus Blackley, video game developer
- Sheila Blair (B.A. 1970), art historian
- Ruben Bolling, aka Ken Fisher, nationally syndicated cartoonist
- Jan Brett (attended 1969–70), illustrator
- Margaret Fitzhugh Browne, painter
- David Buckley (MFA 1977), painter, former musician with the Barracudas
- Lisa Bufano, performance artist
- Al Capp (non-degreed), cartoonist of Li'l Abner
- Marie Cosindas (attended 1947–50 and 1955–56), photographer
- Holly Coulis (M.F.A., 1998), painter
- Allan Rohan Crite (diploma, 1936), painter
- Taylor Davis, plywood sculptor
- Adio diBiccari, sculptor
- Philip-Lorca diCorcia, photographer
- Jim Dine (attended 1950–53 and 1955–58), painter and printmaker
- Omer Fast (BFA, 1995), video artist
- Zach Feuer (BFA 1996–2000), art dealer
- Margaret Henderson Floyd, art historian and author of Henry Hobson Richardson and other books on architectural history
- Esther Geller (1921), painter
- Kahlil Gibran (attended 1940–43), painter/sculptor
- Nan Goldin (diploma, 1977; fifth year certificate, 1978), photographer
- William Snelling Hadaway, artist, attended 1890s
- William Melton Halsey (1935–1939, recipient of William Paige Fellowship), painter and sculptor
- Doc Hammer (briefly attended), painter
- Todd Hido, photographer
- Nancy Holt (B.A. 1960), artist and sculptor
- Susan Howe (1961), poet, scholar, essayist and critic
- Joan Jonas (attended 1958–61), performance artist
- Lois Mailou Jones (diploma, 1927), painter
- Tom Jung, graphic designer and illustrator
- Ellsworth Kelly (diploma, 1948), painter, sculptor, and printmaker
- Eleanor de Laittre, artist
- Arnold Borisovich Lakhovsky, painter, teacher
- Mira Lehr, painter
- May Hallowell Loud (attended 1879–83), painter
- Jim McNitt, mixed-media painter and photographer
- F. Luis Mora, artist and illustrator
- Mark Morrisroe, photographer
- Laurel Nakadate, video artist and photographer
- Sally Pierone (attended 1940–1942), artist
- Larry Poons (attended 1957–58), painter
- Liz Prince (2002–2007), comic book artist, Ignatz Award winner
- Richard Scarry (diploma, 1942), illustrator
- Elaine Spatz‑Rabinowitz (MFA, 1974), artist
- Doug and Mike Starn (diploma, 1984; fifth year certificate, 1985), photographers and performance artists
- Frank Stout (1949), painter
- Tom Sutton, illustrator and comic book artist
- Edmund Tarbell (diploma, 1882), painter
- Wallace Tripp (attended 1960, 1964), illustrator
- Cy Twombly (diploma, 1949), painter, sculptor, printmaker
- John A. Wilson, sculptor
- Peter Wolf, painter, singer
- Levni Yilmaz, animator and cartoonist

== Architecture ==
- Macy DuBois (B.A. 1951), Canadian architect whose work is prominent in Toronto
- Michael Van Valkenburgh (attended 1974–75), landscape architect

== Business ==
- Yusuf Hassan Abdi (M.A.), former director of IRIN
- Peter Ackerman, managing director of Rockport Capital
- Vikram Akula (B.A. 1990), founder and CEO of SKS Microfinance
- Dan Barber (B.A. 1992), chef and co-owner of Blue Hill Restaurant
- John Bello (B.A. 1968), founder and former CEO of SoBe Beverages and former president of NFL Properties
- Samuel T. Byrne, founder of CrossHarbor Capital Partners and owner of the Yellowstone Club
- Dov Charney (attended), CEO and founder of American Apparel
- Charles S. Cohen (B.A. 1974), real estate developer and film producer
- William Cummings (B.A. 1958), head of the Cummings Foundation, one of the largest in New England, with over $2 billion in assets
- Susan Decker (B.S. 1984), former president of Yahoo!, Inc.
- Dick Dietrich (B.A. 1968), co-founder and CEO of GED Integrated Glass Solutions
- Jamie Dimon (B.A. 1978), CEO of JP Morgan Chase Corporation
- Peter R. Dolan (B.A. 1978), former CEO of Bristol-Myers Squibb
- John J. Donovan, entrepreneur, founder of Cambridge Technology Partners
- Ben duPont (B.S. 1986), businessman, son of Pete du Pont
- Andrew Fastow, former CFO of Enron
- Lea Fastow née Weingarten, former Enron assistant treasurer and wife of Andrew Fastow
- Seth Godin (B.S. 1979), marketing expert and founder of Yoyodyne and Squidoo
- Bernard Marshall Gordon, former president and CEO of Analogic Corporation, Neurologica Corporation, and Gordon Engineering Company; inventor, holds over 30 patents
- Jonathan Greenblatt, CEO of GOOD Magazine and co-founder of Ethos water, current national director and CEO of the Anti-Defamation League
- Jacqueline Hernandez (B.A. 1988), president of Combate Americas, and CEO of Telemundo Media
- Eduardo Hochschild, chairman of Hochschild Mining
- Robert Hormats (B.A. 1965, M.A. 1966, M.A.L.D. 1967, Ph.D. 1970), vice chairman of Goldman Sachs International
- Meg Hourihan, co-founder of Pyra Labs, creator of Blogger
- Jeff Kindler (B.A. 1977), CEO of Pfizer Inc., former vice president of General Electric Co. and executive vice president of Corporate Relations at McDonald's
- Ellen J. Kullman (B.S. 1978), ex-CEO of DuPont and an adviser on President Obama's Council on Jobs and Competitiveness
- Jim Manzi, former president, chairman, and CEO of Lotus Development Corporation
- John T. McCarthy (B.A. 1968, M.A. 1973), chairman of ING Group Turkey
- Harold McGraw III (B.A. 1972), president and CEO of McGraw-Hill Companies; Chairman of the Business Roundtable
- Umberto Milletti, CEO and co-founder of InsideView and co-founder of DigitalThink
- Soichiro Minami, Japanese businessman and billionaire who founded job search and human resources software firm Visional
- Susan Morse (B.A. 1969), first female president of the Olympic Club
- Khaldoon Al Mubarak (B.S.), CEO of Mubadala Development Company and chairman of Manchester City F.C.
- John Martin Mugar, retired chairman and president of Star Market
- Andrew M. Murstein, founder, board member, president, and largest shareholder of Medallion Financial
- Joseph Neubauer (B.S. 1963), former CEO and current chairman of the board of ARAMARK Corporation
- Pierre Omidyar (B.S. 1988), founder of eBay
- Roy Raymond, founder of Victoria's Secret lingerie retail stores
- Ali Sabancı, member of the Sabancı family, chairman of Pegasus Airlines, Desas, and Esaslı Gıda, and former head of projects at Sabancı Holding
- Scott Sanborn (B.A. 1992), CEO and president of LendingClub
- Monty Sarhan, CEO and editor-in-chief of Cracked Entertainment, vice president of Viacom
- Anthony Scaramucci (B.A. 1986), founder of SkyBridge Capital
- Thomas Schmidheiny, billionaire and entrepreneur
- Joel Simkhai (B.A. 1998), CEO and founder of Grindr and Blendr
- Jeff Stibel (B.A. 1995), CEO of Web.com
- Richard F. Syron (Ph.D. 1971), former chairman and CEO of the Federal Home Loan Mortgage Corporation
- Jonathan Tisch (B.A. 1976), billionaire chairman and CEO of Loews Hotels, co-owner of the New York Giants
- Janice Savin Williams, founder and senior principal at Williams Capital Group
- Walter B. Wriston (M.A. 1942), chairman and CEO of Citicorp/Citibank 1967–1984

== Crime ==
- Elaine Brown, tax protester involved in a five-month armed standoff
- Gina Grant, committer of matricide
- Jonathan Pollard (did not graduate), Israeli-American spy
- Harry Sagansky, member of the Jewish Mafia, oldest organized crime figure to serve a federal prison term
- Jon Schillaci (did not graduate), convicted sex offender previously listed as one of the FBI's Ten Most Wanted Fugitives

== Diplomacy ==
- Jonathan Addleton (M.A. 1982, Ph.D. 1991), U.S. ambassador to Mongolia (2009–2012)
- Rafeeuddin Ahmed (M.A. 1956), former UN under-secretary-general and Pakistan foreign service officer
- Shafi U Ahmed, Bangladeshi high commissioner to the United Kingdom
- Hady Amr (B.A. 1988), special representative for Palestinian affairs, policy analyst and author specializing in U.S.-Arab relations
- Anthony Banbury (B.A. 1986, M.A. 1992), United Nations assistant secretary-general for Field Support
- C. Fred Bergsten (M.A. 1962, M.A.L.D. 1963, Ph.D. 1969), former assistant secretary for International Affairs at the U.S. Treasury Department and senior fellow at the Carnegie Endowment for International Peace and Council on Foreign Relations
- Barbara Bodine (M.A. 1971), former U.S. ambassador to Yemen and Kuwait
- Richard Boucher (B.A. 1973), U.S. assistant secretary of state for South and Central Asian Affairs, former assistant secretary for Public Affairs and chief spokesperson for the U.S. State Department, ambassador to Cyprus, and consulate general of the United States in Hong Kong
- Anson Chan Fang On-sang (陳方安生), prominent Hong Kong politician; first woman and first Chinese person to hold the second-highest governmental position in Hong Kong
- Aizaz Ahmad Chaudhry, current foreign secretary of Pakistan
- Musa Javed Chohan, former Pakistani ambassador to France
- J. Adam Ereli (M.A. 1989), U.S. ambassador to Bahrain
- Jeffrey Feltman (M.A.L.D. 1983), U.S. assistant secretary of state for Near Eastern Affairs and former ambassador to Lebanon
- Michael Hammer (M.A. 1987), ambassador from the United States to Chile
- John E. Herbst, U.S. State Department coordinator for Reconstruction and Stabilization, former U.S. ambassador to Ukraine and Uzbekistan
- Wolfgang Ischinger (M.A. 1973), former German ambassador to the U.S. and the U.K.
- Roberta S. Jacobson (M.A.L.D 1986), U.S. ambassador to Mexico (2016–present)
- Ismat Jahan, Bangladeshi ambassador and permanent representative to the UN, former ambassador to the Netherlands
- Michelle Kwan (M.A.L.D. 2011), U.S. ambassador to Belize (2022–present) and former Olympic figure skater
- Mark W. Libby (B.A. 1992), US diplomat
- Liu Xiaoming, former Chinese ambassador to the United Kingdom
- Sarah-Ann Lynch (M.A. 1990), US ambassador to Guyana (2019–present)
- Edwin W. Martin, former U.S. ambassador to Burma and consul general of the United States in Hong Kong
- David McKean (M.A.L.D. 1986), U.S. ambassador to Luxembourg (2016–present); director of Policy Planning (2013–2015)
- Masud Bin Momen, Bangladeshi foreign secretary
- General William T. Monroe (M.A. 1974), U.S. ambassador to Bahrain
- Daniel Patrick Moynihan (B.A. 1948, M.A. 1949, Ph.D. 1961), U.S. senator from New York (1977–2001) and former U.S. ambassador to the U.N. and India
- Bernd Mützelburg, German special envoy to Afghanistan and Pakistan and former German ambassador to India
- Thomas R. Pickering (M.A. 1954), former U.S. undersecretary of state for Political Affairs and ambassador to the United Nations, Israel, India, and Russia
- Mitchell Reiss (M.A.L.D. 1980), former director of Policy Planning at the United States Department of State and United States special envoy for Northern Ireland, current president of Washington College
- Iqbal Riza, former assistant secretary-general of the United Nations for Peacekeeping and Pakistani diplomat
- Klaus Scharioth (M.A., M.A.L.D., Ph.D. 1978), German ambassador to the United States
- Konrad Seitz (M.A. 1967), former German ambassador to India, Italy, and China
- Alan Solomont (B.A. 1970), U.S. ambassador to Spain (2009–2013)
- Shashi Tharoor (M.A. 1976, M.A.L.D. 1977, Ph.D. 1979), former UN under-secretary-general and Indian Minister for External Affairs, current member of Indian Parliament
- Malcolm Toon (B.A. 1937, M.A. 1939), former U.S. ambassador to the Soviet Union, Israel, Yugoslavia, and Czechoslovakia
- David Welch (M.A. 1977), U.S. assistant secretary of state for Near Eastern Affairs, former ambassador to Egypt
- Hassan Wirajuda (M.A. 1984), foreign minister of Indonesia

== Entertainment ==
=== Film and television ===
- Abraham Attah (2026), actor
- Hank Azaria (B.A. 1988), actor and voice actor most famous for his work on The Simpsons and various films
- Jessica Biel (attended), film actress
- David W. Burke (B.A. 1957), former president of CBS News
- Rob Burnett (B.A. 1984), Emmy Award-winning executive producer and former head writer of Late Night with David Letterman, president and CEO of Worldwide Pants
- David Costabile (B.A. 1989), actor, known for his recurring roles on The Wire, Flight of the Conchords, and Breaking Bad
- Chiara de Luca (B.A. 2001), French-Italian actress
- Dom DeLuise (attended), actor, most famous for his work in Blazing Saddles and Space Balls and as host of the television show Candid Camera
- Lou DiBella, founder/CEO of Dibella Entertainment, owner of the Connecticut Defenders, former head of programming for HBO Sports, TV/film producer, and boxing promoter
- David Faber (B.A. 1985), CNBC market analyst and host of Squawk on the Street
- Adam Felber, political satirist, actor, radio personality, and humorist
- Nicole Fiscella, Gossip Girl actress and model
- Peter Gallagher (B.A. 1977), Golden Globe and SAG Award-winning actor, best known for his roles in The O.C., American Beauty, and Mr. Deeds
- Joshua Gates, host of Syfy channel's Destination Truth and the Discovery Channel's Expedition Unknown
- Nancy Glass, CEO of Glass Entertainment Group and formerly an anchor/reporter for several national television shows
- Cary Granat (B.A. 1990), co-founder and CEO of Walden Media, former president of Miramax's Dimension Division
- Jeff Greenstein (B.A. 1984), Emmy Award-winning TV writer and executive producer of Will & Grace
- Susan Haskell (B.S. 1985), Emmy Award-winning Canadian actress, One Life to Live
- Joanna Hausmann (B.A. 2011), comedian and correspondent of Bill Nye Saves the World
- Dan Hedaya (B.A. 1962), film actor, best known for Clueless and Blood Simple
- William Hurt (B.A. 1972), Academy Award-winning actor, well known for roles in films such as Kiss of the Spider Woman, Broadcast News, A History of Violence, and The Incredible Hulk
- Kara Kennedy (B.A. 1983), filmmaker, social activist, daughter of Ted Kennedy
- Brian Koppelman (B.A. 1988), screenwriter (Runaway Jury, Ocean's Thirteen, and The Girlfriend Experience) and producer
- Stephen Kunken, TV and film actor
- Christopher Lawford (B.A. 1977), son of Peter Lawford, author, actor, and activist
- Steven Lisberger (B.F.A. 1974), director of Tron
- Lilia Luciano, Puerto Rican actress and TV reporter working in Spanish-language television in the United States
- David Lynch (attended 1964–65), filmmaker
- Stephen Macht (M.A. 1967), TV and film actor
- Ben Mankiewicz (B.A. 1989), TV personality and host of Turner Classic Movies
- Niels Mueller, filmmaker (The Assassination of Richard Nixon)
- Ameesha Patel (B.A. 1997), Bollywood actress
- Oliver Platt (B.A. 1983), Emmy, Golden Globe, and SAG-nominated actor (Huff, Frost/Nixon, 2012)
- Sendhil Ramamurthy (B.A. 1996), actor on Heroes
- Shari Redstone, founder and chairwoman of ViacomCBS Inc. and president of National Amusements
- Peter Roth (B.A. 1972), CEO of Warner Brothers Television
- Melissa Russo, TV news anchor for WNBC-TV News in New York City
- Joshua Seftel (B.A. 1990), filmmaker (War Inc.)
- Justine Shapiro, movie and TV actress; co-host of Globe Trekker
- Neal Shapiro (B.A. 1980), Emmy Award-winning president and CEO of the PBS station WNET/WLIW in New York City; former president of NBC News
- Atika Shubert, Jerusalem bureau chief for CNN
- Ben Silverman (B.A. 1992), co-chairman of NBC Entertainment and NBC Universal Television Studio
- Laura Silverman, actress on The Sarah Silverman Program and sister of comedian Sarah Silverman
- David Sonenberg (B.A. 1968), Academy Award-winning movie producer; founder and head of the music management company DAS Communications Ltd
- Will Tiao, TV actor
- Steve Tisch (B.A. 1971), Academy Award-winning producer and co-owner of the New York Giants with his brother Jonathan Tisch
- Cyrus Veyssi, influencer and former TV show co-host
- Meredith Vieira (B.A. 1975), TV host of The Today Show, formerly of The View
- Aury Wallington (B.A. 1991), screenwriter and novelist
- Rainn Wilson (attended), actor and co-star of The Office
- Gary Winick (B.A. 1984), film director (Tadpole, Charlotte's Web) and producer

=== Music and dance ===
- Dan Avidan, comedian and singer, known for his work on Ninja Sex Party and Game Grumps
- Matt Ballinger, actor and boy band singer in Dream Street
- Garnett Bruce (B.A. 1989), opera director
- Alex Caplow, lead singer of Magic Man
- Tracy Chapman (B.A. 1987), multi-platinum and Grammy Award-winning singer/songwriter
- Slaid Cleaves, folk musician
- All members of Crumb, psychedelic rock band
- Paul DeGeorge (B.S.Ch.E. 2001), member of the band Harry and the Potters
- Ezra Furman, frontwoman of the band Ezra Furman and the Harpoons
- Adam Gardner (B.A. 1995), guitarist and vocalist for the band Guster
- Matt Glaser, jazz and bluegrass violinist, former chair of the string department at the Berklee College of Music
- Don Grolnick (B.A. 1968), jazz pianist and composer
- Guster, alternative rock band
- Jester Hairston (B.A. 1929), composer, conductor, and actor
- Leslie Hall (2000–2003), frontwoman for Leslie and the Ly's
- Juliana Hatfield (2012), musician
- Alan Hovhaness, composer
- Staś Kmieć (B.A. 1982), theater, dance, and film director-choreographer, actor, dancer, and the foremost U.S. authority on Polish folk dance and culture
- James S. Levine (B.A. 1996), film and television composer
- Erik Lindgren (B.A. 1976), composer and musician
- Ryan Miller (B.A. 1995), lead singer and guitarist for rock band Guster
- Jim Nollman, composer, musician, and author involved with animal communications
- Charles North (B.A. 1962), poet
- Daniel Pritzker (B.A. 1981), billionaire guitarist and songwriter for Sonia Dada, member of the Pritzker family
- The Rare Occasions, band whose members met at Tufts University
- Pete Robbins, jazz saxophonist
- Jeff Saltzman, drummer for Allegaeon
- Eric Schwartz, folk singer/songwriter
- Darrell Scott (B.A. 1988), country singer/songwriter and multi-instrumentalist
- Deke Sharon (B.A. 1991, double degree with New England Conservatory of Music), a cappella singer, composer, arranger, and producer
- Timeflies, pop/hip hop duo, both members
- Malcolm Travis (attended 1974–1978), musician
- Michael "Mudcat" Ward, blues bassist, pianist and songwriter

== Government ==
- Chris Bortz (B.A. 1996), member of Cincinnati City Council 2005–2011
- Tom Casey (B.A., M.A.L.D.), deputy spokesman and deputy assistant secretary for Public Affairs at the U.S. State Department
- Leo Otis Colbert (B.S. 1907), third director of the United States Coast and Geodetic Survey and rear admiral
- Richard N. Goodwin (B.A. 1953), former U.S. deputy assistant secretary of State for Inter-American Affairs, political speechwriter, author, and playwright
- Admiral Jonathan Howe (B.A. 1980), former U.S. deputy National Security advisor
- Matthew Levitt (M.A., Ph.D.), former deputy assistant secretary for Intelligence and Analysis at the U.S. Department of the Treasury and director of the Stein Program on Counterterrorism and Intelligence at the Washington Institute for Near East Policy
- Winston Lord (M.A. 1960), U.S. assistant secretary of state for East Asian and Pacific Affairs, president of the Council on Foreign Relations
- Susan K. Martin (B.A. 1959), director of the National Commission on Libraries and Information Science
- Gina McCarthy (M.S. 1981), administrator of the EPA under President Obama
- Peter Navarro (B.A. 1972), director of the Office of Trade and Manufacturing Policy
- Phyllis E. Oakley (M.A. 1957), U.S. assistant secretary of state for Population, Refugees, and Migration (1994–97) and Intelligence and Research (1997–99)
- Farah Pandith, special representative to Muslim communities for the U.S. Department of State
- Tara D. Sonenshine (B.A. 1981), U.S. under secretary of state for Public Diplomacy and Public Affairs for Barack Obama's administration
- Bill Thompson (B.A. 1974), New York City comptroller and Democratic mayoral candidate
- C. David Welch, U.S. assistant secretary of state for Near Eastern Affairs and regional president of Bechtel

== Journalism ==
- Erin Arvedlund, author and financial journalist
- Matt Bai (B.A. 1990), author and political reporter for the New York Times Magazine
- Liz Landers (B.A. 2013), journalist and correspondent for PBS News
- Laura Lang (B.A. 1977), CEO of Time Inc.
- Tony Massarotti, sportswriter for The Boston Globe and author
- Jay Newton-Small, Washington Correspondent for TIME
- Joanne Pransky, robotics journalist and magazine editor
- Eric Rubin (M.D/Ph.D. 1990), editor-in-chief of The New England Journal of Medicine
- Arthur Ochs Sulzberger, Jr. (B.A. 1974), publisher of The New York Times

== Law ==
- Nancy Atlas (B.S. 1971), judge on the United States District Court for the Southern District of Texas
- André Birotte Jr. (B.S. 1987), judge on the United States District Court for the Central District of California
- John L. Carroll, former chief U.S. magistrate judge for the Middle District of Alabama and Dean of Samford University's Cumberland School of Law
- R. Guy Cole, Jr. (B.A. 1972), federal judge on the United States Court of Appeals for the Sixth Circuit
- Ralph Adam Fine, Wisconsin Court of Appeals judge
- Morgan Harper (B.A.), attorney and community organizer
- Faith S. Hochberg (B.A. 1972), federal judge on the United States District Court for the District of New Jersey and former deputy assistant secretary for law enforcement at the U.S. Department of Treasury
- Timothy Lewis (B.A. 1976), former federal judge on the United States Court of Appeals for the Third Circuit
- Rosemonde Pierre-Louis, Haitian-American activist and attorney for women's and immigrant rights
- Nancy E. Rice (B.A. 1972), former chief justice of the Colorado Supreme Court
- John G. Sargent (B.A. 1887), former attorney general of the United States
- Warren Silver, Maine Supreme Court justice
- Norman H. Stahl (B.A. 1952), judge on the United States Court of Appeals for the First Circuit
- Laura Denvir Stith, Missouri Supreme Court judge

== Literature ==
- Elliot Ackerman (B.A. M.A.), author
- Fawzia Afzal-Khan (M.A., Ph.D.), author and professor
- Jessica Anderson (B.A. 1994), author
- Ian C. Ballon, author of several Internet law books, including a four-volume treatise
- Cathy Bao Bean, author of The Chopsticks-Fork Principle: A Memoir and Manual
- Christopher Castellani, author of Maddalena trilogy and 2014 Guggenheim Fellow
- John Ciardi (B.A. 1938), poet and translator
- Cid Corman, poet, translator and poetry journal editor
- George Michael Cuomo (B.A. 1952), author
- Pieretta Dawn, author
- Barbara Delinsky (B.A. 1967), bestselling author
- Juan Manuel García Passalacqua, Puerto Rican policy analyst and author
- Christopher Golden, horror, fantasy, and suspense novelist
- Cary Granat (B.A. 1990), co-founder and CEO of Walden Media, former president of Miramax's Dimension Division
- Han Bi-ya, Korean activist, writer
- Bette Bao Lord (B.A. 1959, M.A. 1960), author and civic activist
- William MacDonald, prolific Christian author
- Gregory Maguire (Ph.D. 1990), author of the novels Wicked and Confessions of an Ugly Stepsister
- Maliha Masood, author
- Michael McDowell, author and screenwriter
- Daniel Paisner (B.A. 1982), author best known for his work as a ghostwriter and collaborator
- Jane Lippitt Patterson (1829–1919), writer and editor
- Anita Shreve (B.A. 1968), author
- Darin Strauss (B.A. 1992), novelist and winner of the National Book Critics Circle Award
- Wylie Sypher (M.A. 1929), writer
- Mary L. Trump, author of Too Much and Never Enough: How My Family Created the World's Most Dangerous Man (2020)
- Nathanael West (did not finish), author and screenwriter
- Ellen Emerson White, writer
- Tiphanie Yanique, fiction writer, poet, and essayist

== Military ==
- Joseph F. Dunford, Jr., chairman of Joint Chiefs of Staff, ex-commanding general of the 1st Marine Expeditionary Force and Marine Corps Forces
- General Joseph P. Hoar (B.A. 1956), general and former commander-in-chief of the United States Central Command
- Susan Livingstone (M.A.L.D. 1981), former acting U.S. secretary of the Navy and assistant secretary of the U.S. Army for Installations, Logistics and Environment
- Lieutenant Colonel Murray Sanders, U.S. Army Medical Corps officer nominated for Nobel Prize in Medicine
- Admiral James G. Stavridis, NATO's Supreme Allied Commander Europe and commander of the U.S. European Command
- Major General Harold R. Story, commander of the 42nd Infantry Division
- Admiral Patrick M. Walsh, commander of the U.S. Pacific Fleet, former U.S. vice chief of Naval Operations and Blue Angels aviator

== Nobel laureates ==
- Eugene F. Fama (B.A. 1960), winner of the 2013 Nobel Prize in Economics for his work on portfolio theory and asset pricing
- Roderick MacKinnon (M.D. 1982), winner of the 2003 Nobel Prize in Chemistry for his work on the structure and operation of ion channels
- Juan Manuel Santos (Fulbright, 1981), winner of the 2016 Nobel Peace Prize, president of Colombia

== Politics ==
=== Heads of state ===
- Shukri Ghanem (Ph.D. 1975), former prime minister of Libya
- Kostas Karamanlis (M.A. 1982, Ph.D. 1984), prime minister of Greece
- Mulatu Teshome (M.A. 1990), former president of Ethiopia

=== U.S. governors ===
- General Seldon Connor (B.A. 1859), former governor of Maine
- F. Ray Keyser Jr. (B.A. 1950), former governor of Vermont
- Bill Richardson (B.A. 1970), governor of New Mexico, former U.S. secretary of energy, and ambassador to the United Nations
- Stanley C. Wilson (B.A. 1901), former governor of Vermont

=== U.S. Senate ===
- Scott Brown (B.A. 1981), member of the United States Senate
- Daniel Patrick Moynihan (B.A. 1948, M.A. 1949, Ph.D. 1961), U.S. senator from New York (1977–2001) and former U.S. ambassador to the U.N. and India

=== U.S. Congress ===
- Jeb Bradley (B.A. 1974), U.S. representative from New Hampshire
- Joe Courtney (B.A. 1975), U.S. representative from Connecticut
- Dan Crenshaw (B.A. 2006), U.S. representative from Texas
- Peter DeFazio (B.A. 1969), U.S. representative from Oregon
- Thomas Kean, Jr. (M.A. 1997), U.S. representative from New Jersey
- Cynthia McKinney (M.A. 1979), U.S. representative from Georgia
- John Olver (M.S. 1956), U.S. representative from Massachusetts
- Frank Pallone (M.A. 1974), U.S. representative from New Jersey since 1988
- William Leon St. Onge (B.A. 1941), U.S. representative from Connecticut and mayor of Putnam
- John Philip Swasey, U.S. representative from Maine

=== Foreign officials ===
- Bolaji Akinyemi (M.A. 1965, M.A.L.D. 1966), Nigerian minister of external affairs 1985–1987
- Kow Nkensen Arkaah (B.A. 1952), vice president of Ghana 1993–1997
- Michael Dobbs, former chief of staff of the Conservative Party (United Kingdom) and political thriller novelist
- Colette Flesch, Luxembourg politician and Olympic fencing competitor
- Jean Francois-Poncet (M.A. 1948), French politician and minister of foreign affairs 1978–1981
- Kostas Achileas Karamanlis, Greek politician and former minister of transportation
- Olga Kefalogianni (M.A. 2006), Greek politician and minister of tourism
- Shahryar Khan, former foreign secretary of Pakistan, author
- John Kuan, former president of the Examination Yuan of the Republic of China
- Jeffrey Lam, member of the Legislative Council of Hong Kong and managing director of Forward Winsome Industries
- Lê Hoài Trung, foreign minister of Vietnam
- Juan Fernando Lopez Aguilar, Spanish politician and former minister of justice
- Mbuyamu I. Matungulu (Ph.D. 1986), former DRC minister of finance, senior economist at the International Monetary Fund (IMF)
- Phạm Bình Minh, deputy prime minister and foreign minister of Vietnam
- Vardan Oskanyan, former Armenian minister of foreign affairs
- Surakiart Sathirathai, former deputy prime minister, foreign minister, and finance minister of Thailand
- Antoinette Sayeh (M.A. 1980, M.A.L.D. 1982, Ph.D. 1985), director of the African Department at the International Monetary Fund, former finance minister of Liberia
- Radmila Sekerinska (M.A. 2007), deputy prime minister of Macedonia and minister of defense of Macedonia
- Abdulla Shahid, president of the United Nations General Assembly
- Godfrey Smith (M.A. 2002), Belizean minister of foreign affairs, defence, and national emergency management
- Shashi Tharoor (M.A. 1976, M.A.L.D. 1977, Ph.D. 1979), Indian minister of state for external affairs, former U.N. under-secretary-general for Communications and Public Information, and prolific author
- Edson Zvobgo (B.A. 1964), founder of Zimbabwe's ruling party Zanu-PF and former minister of justice

=== State officials ===
- Phil Bartlett (B.A. 1998), Maine Senate
- Francis X. Bellotti (B.A. 1947), former lieutenant governor and attorney general of Massachusetts
- Horace T. Cahill, former lieutenant governor of Massachusetts
- Elmer Hewitt Capen (B.A. 1860), former member of the Massachusetts House of Representatives and third president of Tufts College
- Anthony Cortese, former commissioner of the Massachusetts Department of Environmental Protection; environmental activist and researcher
- Benjamin Downing, Democratic state senator from Massachusetts, elected in 2006 at age 24
- Steve Dyer, former member of Ohio House of Representatives 2007–2010
- Michael E. Festa (B.A. 1976), former member of the Massachusetts House of Representatives and Massachusetts secretary of Elder Affairs
- Dan Gelber (B.A. 1982), member of the Florida Senate and 38th mayor of Miami Beach, Florida
- Jack Hart (B.A. 1991), member of the Massachusetts State Senate
- Albert W. Harvey (attended), United States marshal for the District of Vermont
- Jon Hecht, member of the Massachusetts House of Representatives
- Frank Hornstein, Minnesota state representative, member of the Democratic-Farmer-Labor party; elected for the first time in 2002
- George Keverian, speaker of the Massachusetts House of Representatives 1985–1991
- Tram Nguyen (B.A. 2008), member of the Massachusetts House of Representatives (2019–present)
- Kristina Roegner, member of Ohio House of Representatives
- Carl M. Sciortino, member of the Massachusetts House of Representatives 2004–2014, Democratic Party
- Steve Simon (B.A. 1992), Minnesota secretary of state 2015–present, member of the Minnesota House of Representatives 2005–2015
- Keith L. T. Wright (B.A. 1977), member of the New York State Assembly (1992–present)

=== City officials ===
- Nina Albert (B.S.), acting deputy mayor of Washington, D.C. for planning and economic development (2023–present)
- Charles Neal Barney (B.A. 1895), former mayor of Lynn, Massachusetts
- Kirk Caldwell, mayor of Honolulu, Hawaii
- Richard B. Coolidge (B.A. 1902), former mayor of Medford, Massachusetts
- Philip Levine, 37th mayor of Miami Beach, Florida
- Patrick O. Murphy, former mayor of Lowell, Massachusetts
- Charles Yancey (B.S. 1970), member of Boston City Council (1984–2015)

=== Other ===
- Doug Bailey, political strategist who founded The Hotline and Unity08
- Jay Byrne, political strategist and former White House spokesperson
- Prince Cedza Dlamini of Swaziland; human rights activist; grandson of Nelson Mandela
- Jen O'Malley Dillon (B.A. 1998), political strategist, campaign manager for the Kamala Harris 2024 presidential campaign, Joe Biden 2020 presidential campaign and former White House deputy chief of staff
- Michael Dobbs, former chief of staff of the British Conservative Party; political thriller novelist
- Mouin Rabbani, Dutch-Palestinian Middle East analyst specializing in the Arab-Israeli conflict and Palestinian affairs
- Lew Rockwell, libertarian political activist and chairman of the Ludwig von Mises Institute
- Simon Rosenberg, founder of the New Democrat Network, former candidate for chairman of the DNC
- Geng Shuang (M.A. in International Relations 2006), Chinese diplomat and ambassador to the United Nations
- William L. Uanna, security officer, Manhattan Project and U.S. Atomic Energy Commission
- Philip D. Zelikow (M.A. 1984, Ph.D. 1995), counselor of the U.S. State Department and executive director of the 9/11 Commission

== Pulitzer Prize winners ==
- Leslie Gelb (B.A. 1959), former U.S. assistant secretary of state, president emeritus of the Council on Foreign Relations
- Erin Kelly, professor of philosophy, won the 2022 Pulitzer Prize for biography for Chasing Me to My Grave, co-written with subject Winfred Rembert
- Mark Krikorian, executive director of Center for Immigration Studies and conservative pundit
- Maxine Kumin, poet, Poet Laureate of the United States 1981–1982
- Philip Levine, poet and National Book Award recipient
- April Saul, photojournalist, awarded the Pulitzer Prize in Exploratory Journalism in 1997
- Edward Schumacher-Matos (M.A.), American-Colombian journalist, part of the staff of Philadelphia Inquirer who won Pulitzer in 1980
- Martin Sherwin, Walter S. Dickson professor of English and American History, Pulitzer Prize winner for biography on J. Robert Oppenheimer
- Natalie Wolchover (Bachelors in Physics, 2008), science journalist, won the 2022 Pulitzer Prize for Explanatory Reporting
- Gordon S. Wood (B.A. 1955), professor of American history at Brown University

== Science, technology, engineering, and mathematics ==
- Kuzhikalail M. Abraham (Ph.D. 1973), pioneer in lithium, lithium-ion, lithium-sulfur, and lithium-air batteries; received Tufts Most Outstanding Achievement and Services Award in 2017
- Stephen Moulton Babcock, agricultural chemist who pioneered the development of nutrition as a science
- Reid Barton, mathematician, winner of the Morgan Prize, and successful performer of the International Science Olympiads
- Seamus Blackley, game developer who helped create the Microsoft Xbox
- Frank N. Blanchard (B.S. 1913), influential herpetologist and zoologist
- Harold Bornstein, doctor and former personal physician to Donald Trump
- Vannevar Bush (B.S., M.S. 1913), engineer and scientist noted for his work on the atom bomb and early computing
- Sean B. Carroll (Ph.D. 1983), influential researcher and professor of evolutionary developmental biology
- Anthony Cortese, environmental activist/researcher and former commissioner of the Massachusetts Department of Environmental Protection
- Bernard Marshall Gordon, inventor who holds over thirty patents; former president and CEO of Analogic Corporation, Neurologica Corporation, and Gordon Engineering Company
- Frederick Grinnell (Ph.D. 1970), cell biologist, bio-ethicist, shortlist for 2010 Royal Society Prizes for Science Books
- Rick Hauck (B.S. 1962), astronaut
- Bartholomew W. Hogan (M.D. 1925), former Surgeon General of the United States Navy and deputy medical director of the American Psychiatric Association
- Robert J. K. Jacob, computer scientist
- Hassan Jawahery (Ph.D. 1981), American-Iranian physicist and former spokesperson for the BaBar experiment
- Sara Murray Jordan (M.D. 1921), gastroenterologist
- Charles Kelman (B.S. 1950), ophthalmologist, surgeon, inventor, and entertainer, known as the "father of photoemulsification"
- Victor A. McKusick, founding editor of the database Online Mendelian Inheritance in Man
- Helen Abbott Michael, organic chemist
- Frederick Stark Pearson, electrical engineer and businessman
- Mark Plotkin (Ph.D. 1989), ethnobotanist and expert on rainforest ecosystems
- Victor Prather (M.D. 1952), US Navy surgeon, set the current altitude record for manned balloon flight with Malcolm Ross in 1961
- John Reif (B.S. 1973), computer science, nanotechnology, and DNA researcher and professor
- Keith Ross, NYU computer science professor; dean of engineering NYU Shanghai; ACM and IEEE Fellow
- Ellery Schempp (B.S. 1962), physicist and political activist
- Mary Jane Shultz, Tufts professor and researcher in physical, environmental, materials and surface chemistry
- Lynn L. Silver (Ph.D. 1975), biologist known for her work in antibacterial discovery and development
- Phillip Hagar Smith (B.S. 1928), inventor of the Smith chart, a graphical aid to assist in solving problems with transmission lines and matching circuits
- Mary Crutchfield Wright Thompson, first Black woman to practice dentistry in Boston
- John Q. Trojanowski (M.D./Ph.D. 1976), neurological researcher and professor specializing in degenerative diseases
- Frankie Trull, lobbyist and science advocate focusing on laboratory animal testing; president of the National Association for Biomedical Research, Foundation for Biomedical Research, and Policy Directions Inc.
- Loring W. Tu, Taiwanese-American mathematician working in algebraic topology and geometry
- Norbert Wiener (B.A. 1909), mathematician known as the founder of cybernetics
- Esther Wilkins, dentist and author of Clinical Practice of the Dental Hygienist
- Noah Wilson-Rich, biologist; researcher in pollinator health, urban ecology, and biodiversity
- Ronald C. Wornick (born 1932), food scientist; founder of the Wornick Company, selected by the U.S. Department of Defense to mass-produce meals

== Sports ==
- Tyler C. Andrews (B.S. 2013), ultra-marathoner and mountaineer
- Michael Aresco (B.A. 1972, M.A. 1973), commissioner of the American Athletic Conference
- Bob Backus (B.A. 1951), Olympic track and field athlete who set world records in the hammer throw
- Andrea Baldini (born 1985), Italian foil fencer
- John Bello (B.A. 1968), former president of NFL Properties
- Dick Berggren (M.S. 1967, Ph.D. 1970), motorsports announcer, racecar driver, and magazine editor
- Wally Clement, professional baseball player
- Harrie Dadmun, professional football player
- Lou DiBella, boxing promoter; founder and CEO of Dibella Entertainment; former head of programming for HBO Sports; TV/film producer; owner of the minor league baseball team the Connecticut Defenders
- Dan Doyle, executive director of the Institute for International Sport and former head men's basketball coach at Trinity College
- Frederick M. Ellis, athlete, coach, professor, and head football coach at Tufts 1946–1952
- Carl Etelman (1900–1963), football back and coach
- Colette Flesch, Luxembourgian politician and three-time Olympic fencing competitor
- Chuck Greenberg (B.A. 1982), sports attorney; chairman and founder of the Greenberg Sports Group
- William Grinnell, football player and former head football coach at Northeastern University
- Jesse Grupper (born 1997), Olympic rock climber
- Doc Haggerty, professional football player
- Doc Hazleton, professional baseball player
- Zander Kirkland, Olympic sailor
- Tony Massarotti (B.A. 1989), sportswriter for The Boston Globe; author
- David Mendelblatt, yachtsman and ophthalmologist
- Mark Mendelblatt, yachtsman, three-time college All-American, silver medalist at the 1999 Pan American Games and 2004 Laser World Championships
- Khaldoon Al Mubarak (B.S.), chairman of Manchester City F.C. and CEO of Mubadala Development Company
- Percy S. Prince, former Louisiana Tech head football and baseball coach
- Matt Rand (B.A. 2013), long-distance runner
- Harry Orman Robinson, former head coach of American football at UT-Austin and UMissouri-Columbia
- Wendy Selig-Prieb (B.A. 1982), former CEO of the Milwaukee Brewers
- Heinie Stafford, professional baseball player
- Genevra Stone, Olympic rower
- Ed Tapscott (B.A. 1975), former president and CEO of the Charlotte Bobcats, head coach of the NBA's Washington Wizards
- Jonathan Tisch (B.A. 1976), co-owner of the New York Giants and chairman and CEO of Loews Hotels
- Ted Vogel, marathon runner, competed in 1948 Olympics
- Shane Waldron, tight ends coach for the New England Patriots
- Art Williams, Major League Baseball player
- Peter Wylde (B.A. 1989), Olympic gold medalist in team horse jumping

== Fictional alumni ==
- Elaine Benes, played by Julia Louis-Dreyfus, from the television show Seinfeld, who described it as her "safety school"
- Jennifer Melfi, played by Lorraine Bracco, from the television show The Sopranos

== Faculty ==
=== Nobel laureates ===
- Allan M. Cormack (1924–1998), physicist, winner of the 1979 Nobel Prize in Medicine, inventor of the CAT scan
- Mohamed Elbaradei, winner of the 2005 Nobel Peace Prize; former vice-president of Egypt
- Wassily Leontief, winner of the 1973 Nobel Prize in Economics; GDAE advisory board member and researcher 1993–1999
- Mario Molina, winner of the 1995 Nobel Prize in Chemistry; GDAE advisory board member
- Paul Samuelson, winner of the 1970 Nobel Prize in Economics; part-time professor of international economic relations at Fletcher (1945)
- Amartya Sen, winner of the 1998 Nobel Prize in Economics; GDAE advisory board member
- Rainer Weiss, astrophysicist, winner of the 2017 Nobel Prize in Physics

=== Pulitzer Prize winners ===
- Richard Eberhart, Pulitzer Prize-winning poet
- William A. Henry III, television critic and author, two-time Pulitzer Prize winner in 1976 and 1980
- Erin I. Kelly, professor of philosophy
- Maxine Kumin, Pulitzer Prize-winning poet; Poet Laureate of the United States 1981–1982

=== Others ===
- Tadatoshi Akiba, mathematics professor (1972–1986), Japanese politician and activist
- Frederick Warren Allen (1907–1954, emeritus), sculptor, teacher for 50 years, 30 as head of Sculpture
- Carlos Alvarado Quesada, 48th president of Costa Rica
- Nalini Ambady, social psychologist, famous for pioneering and coining thin-slicing
- Jody Azzouni, logician, philosopher of mathematics
- Lawrence S. Bacow, economist
- Nancy Bauer, philosopher
- Hugo Adam Bedau, ethicist, editor of Civil Disobedience: Theory and Practice (1969) and specialist on the ethical implications of the death penalty
- Jamshed Bharucha, provost, senior vice president, professor of psychology, Music, and Neuroscience (2002–2011)
- Stephen W. Bosworth, dean of the Fletcher School, served as Secretary of State Clinton's special representative for North Korea Policy
- Jay Cantor, author, screenwriter
- Lauro Cavazos, former U.S. secretary of education and president of Texas Tech University
- Antonia Chayes, professor of International Politics and Law, former U.S. under secretary of the Air Force
- Frank Dengler (c. 1877), sculptor, instructor
- Daniel C. Dennett, philosopher, author of Darwin's Dangerous Idea and Consciousness Explained
- John J. Donovan, entrepreneur, assistant professor of pediatrics (1973–1983)
- Michael Downing, writer (Perfect Agreement, Breakfast with Scot)
- Daniel W. Drezner, professor of International Politics; regular featured columnist in Foreign Policy magazine
- Lee Edelman, English professor, author of No Future: Queer Theory and the Death Drive
- David Elkind, professor emeritus of Child Development, author of The Hurried Child, Giants in the Nursery, The Power of Play, and other bestsellers
- Felipe Fernandez-Armesto, history professor
- John Galvin (1995–2000), general and former dean of the Fletcher School of Law and Diplomacy
- Charles Grafly, sculptor, head of modeling, 1917–1929
- Frank Pierrepont Graves, historian of education
- Joseph Igersheimer (1879–1965), German ophthalmologist, famous in Turkey
- Ray Jackendoff, linguist, author of Foundations of Language
- Ayesha Jalal, historian of South Asia, MacArthur fellow, Carnegie scholar
- Sheldon Krimsky
- Brian Mushana Kwesiga, entrepreneur, engineer, and civic leader; former president and CEO, Ugandan North American Association
- Alfred Church Lane, geologist
- Louis Lasagna, former dean of the Sackler School of Graduate Biomedical Sciences and academic dean of the School of Medicine, known for introducing the modern Hippocratic Oath
- Franklin M. Loew, former dean of the College of Veterinary Medicine
- Linda Datcher Loury, former professor of economics
- Zella Luria, psychologist and feminist, known for her pioneering work on the development of gender identity
- David J. Malan, former professor of computer science, Gordon Mckay Professor of Computer Science at Harvard University, known for teaching CS50
- Jerold Mande, former professor of practice (2017–2020); former deputy under secretary for Food Safety at the USDA (2009–2011)
- William Moulton Marston, died 1947, taught briefly at Tufts in the 1920s, creator of Wonder Woman
- William C. Martel, associate professor of International Security Studies
- Gilbert E. Metcalf, John DiBiaggio Professor of Citizenship and Public Service and professor of economics; author of Paying for Pollution: Why a Carbon Tax is Good for America (Oxford Univ Press)
- William Green Miller, professor and associate dean, U.S. ambassador to Ukraine 1993–1998
- Haruki Murakami, Japanese author nominated for Nobel Prize; writing fellow
- Adil Najam, international negotiation and diplomacy
- Vali Nasr, Iranian-American academic and scholar; associate chair of Research at the Department of National Security Affairs of the Naval Postgraduate School in Monterey, California
- Raymond S. Nickerson, psychologist and author
- Bela Lyon Pratt, sculptor, head of modeling, 1893–1917
- Diane Souvaine, chair of the National Science Board
- Robert Sternberg, dean of the College of Arts and Sciences and eminent psychologist, president of the APA
- John H. Sununu (dean of Engineering), governor of New Hampshire, chief of staff of the White House for G.H.W. Bush
- Barry Trimmer, professor of biology; co-invented the world's first soft-bodied robot
- Alexander Vilenkin, theoretical physicist
- Jonathan Wilson, author
- Wayne Winterrowd (1941–2010), horticulturist and author known for his gardens in Southern Vermont
- Chantal Zakari, book artist and graphic designer; faculty
- Karl Zerbe, painter, head of the Department of Painting 1937–1955

== Honorary degree recipients ==
Tufts awards honorary degrees to outstanding people since 1858; among them:

- 1858: Thomas Whittemore (Divinity)
- 1861: Alonzo Ames Miner (Arts)
- 1863: Sylvanus Cobb (Divinity)
- 1865: Thomas Thayer (Divinity)
- 1872: Israel Washburn (Laws)
- 1875: Alonzo Ames Miner (Laws)
- 1876: Seldon Connor (Laws)
- 1886: Henry B. Metcalf (Arts)
- 1890: Arthur Michael (Philosophy)
- 1891: Joseph H. Walker (Laws)
- 1894: Elihu Thomson (Philosophy)
- 1895: Otis Skinner (Arts)
- 1896: Mary Livermore (Laws)
- 1897: Samuel G. Hilborn (Laws)
- 1898: William Leslie Hooper (Philosophy)
- 1899: Minton Warren (Laws)
- 1900: Frederick Stark Pearson (Science), Charles Ernest Fay (Letters)
- 1901: Charles L. Hutchinson (Arts)
- 1902: George S. Boutwell (Laws), Amos Dolbear (Laws)
- 1903: Carroll D. Wright (Laws)
- 1904: William Henry Moody (Laws)
- 1905: William Edwards Huntington (Laws)
- 1909: Charles Neal Barney (Arts)
- 1910: Frank Shipley Collins (Arts), Eben Draper (Laws), Morton Prince (Laws)
- 1911: Marion LeRoy Burton (Laws), Albert Potter Wills (Science)
- 1912: Frederic Aldin Hall (Humane Letters), John G. Sargent (Arts)
- 1913: Alfred Church Lane (Science), Hosea Washington Parker (Laws)
- 1914: Winston Churchill (novelist) (Letters)
- 1915: William Leslie Hooper (Laws)
- 1918: Ralph D. Mershon (Science), Joseph Fort Newton (Divinity)
- 1919: Calvin Coolidge (Laws), William Sims (Laws)
- 1920: Herbert Hoover (Science), Charles L. Hutchinson (Laws)
- 1921: Evangeline Cory Booth (Arts), Samuel Capen (Humane Letters), Joseph Rodefer DeCamp (Arts), Samuel Orace Dunn (Arts), Frank Pierrepont Graves (Humane Letters), William Henry Nichols (Science), John Wingate Weeks (Laws)
- 1922: Henry K. Braley (Laws), Heloise Hersey (Arts), Louise Homer (Arts), Leo Rich Lewis (Letters), Edward Sylvester Morse (Humane Letters)
- 1923: Edward Bok (Humane Letters), Channing H. Cox (Humane Letters), Cyrus Edwin Dallin (Arts), Anna Coleman Ladd (Arts), Angelo Patri (Humane Letters), Hugh Walpole (Letters)
- 1924: Gertrude Vanderbilt Whitney (Fine Arts)
- 1925: Henry Kimball Hadley (Music), Edna St. Vincent Millay (Humane Letters)
- 1926: Frederick Law Olmsted (Fine Arts)
- 1927: Richard E. Byrd (Science), A. Atwater Kent (Science), Frank Lahey (Science), Edith Nourse Rogers (Arts), John van Schaick Jr. (Letters)
- 1928: William Beebe (Science), Charles Ernest Fay (Laws), Charles Lawrance (Science), Eva Le Gallienne (Arts), John Livingston Lowes (Humane Letters), Frank Burr Mallory (Science)
- 1929: Asa White Kenney Billings (Electrical Engineering), Benjamin Newhall Johnson (Arts), Herbert Lord (Laws), Daniel Gregory Mason (Letters)
- 1930: Frank Weston Benson (Arts), Arthur Dehon Little (Science)
- 1931: Margaret Ayer Barnes (Arts), Marion Edwards Park (Humane Letters), Stanley Calef Wilson (Laws), Alfred Worcester (Science)
- 1932: George Grey Barnard (Arts), Vannevar Bush (Science), Lou Henry Hoover (Arts), Archibald MacLeish (Arts), James Grover McDonald (Laws)
- 1933: Mabel Wheeler Daniels (Arts), Abbott Lawrence Lowell (Letters), Marie Danforth Page (Arts)
- 1934: James Bryant Conant (Science), Harold L. Ickes (Laws)
- 1935: Carter Glass (Laws), Francis Russell Hart (Arts), Harry M. Lydenberg (Letters), Cornelia Otis Skinner (Arts), Sarah Wambaugh (Humane Letter)
- 1936: Dorothy Thompson (Letters)
- 1937: Van Wyck Brooks (Laws), Leonard Carmichael (Science), Thomas Edmund Dewey (Laws), Helen Jerome Eddy (Arts), Sylvanus Morley (Letters)
- 1938: Miller McClintock (Science), Henry Merritt Wriston (Laws)
- 1939: Leo Otis Colbert (Science), John Foster Dulles (Letters), George Horace Gallup (Science)
- 1940: Francis Henry Taylor (Humane Letters)
- 1941: Leason Heberling Adams (Science), Lillian Hellman (Arts), George Stewart Miller (Letters), Jay Pierrepont Moffat (Laws)
- 1942: Walter Nash (Laws), Katharine Elizabeth McBride (Humane Letters), Leverett Saltonstall (Laws)
- 1943: Karl Taylor Compton (Laws), Joseph Clark Grew (Laws), Sara Murray Jordan (Science)
- 1944: Beardsley Ruml (Laws)
- 1945: Arthur William Coolidge (Arts), John Sloan Dickey (Laws), Theresa Helburn (Arts), Eric Johnston (Laws), Charles Donagh Maginnis (Humane Letters)
- 1946: Norbert Wiener (Science), Laurence Olivier (Fine Arts)
- 1947: Joseph W. Martin Jr. (Laws)
- 1948: Carl Stephens Ell (Laws)
- 1949: Ralph Lowell (Laws)
- 1950: Thomas Whittemore (Letters)
- 1951: Thomas Dudley Cabot (Humane Letters)
- 1952: Henry Chauncey (Science)
- 1953: Robert Cutler (Laws)
- 1954: John F. Kennedy (Letters)
- 1955: Nathan M. Pusey (Letters)
- 1956: John T. Blake (Science)
- 1957: Earl Warren (Laws)
- 1958: Robert F. Kennedy (Laws)
- 1959: Robert Frost (Letters)
- 1960: Hiram Fong (Laws)
- 1961: F. Ray Keyser Jr. (Laws)
- 1962: Walter Hallstein (Laws)
- 1963: James William Fulbright (Letters), Lyndon B. Johnson (Letters)
- 1964: Charles A. Dana (Humane Letters)
- 1965: Jeremy Ingalls (Letters)
- 1966: William Scranton (Laws), Nils Wessell (Laws)
- 1967: John F. Collins (Laws), Abigail Adams Eliot (Humane Letters)
- 1968: Daniel Moynihan (Laws)
- 1969: Kenneth Bancroft Clark (Humane Letters), Lee Alvin DuBridge (Science), Paul A. Freund (Laws), Howard Nemerov (Letters), Joseph Silverstein (Music)
- 1970: Patricia Roberts Harris (Laws), Harris Wofford (Laws)
- 1971: Arthur Fiedler (Music)
- 1972: Jester Hairston (Music)
- 1974: Theodore Hesburgh (Laws), Shirley Hufstedler (Laws), Barbara Jordan (Laws), Edson Zvobgo (Arts)
- 1976: John Brademas (Laws), Matina Horner (Humane Letters), Virginia Knauer (Laws)
- 1977: Irving Selikoff (Science), B.F. Skinner (Letters), Malcolm Toon (Laws)
- 1978: Victor McKusick (Science), David Nachmansohn (Science)
- 1979: Salvador E. Luria (Science)
- 1980: Allan M. Cormack (Science)
- 1981: Leo Gross (Laws)
- 1982: Alexander R. Todd (Science)
- 1983: Sandra Day O'Connor (Letters), Edward Kennedy (Letters)
- 1984: Arthur M. Sackler (Humane Letters), John Williams (Music)
- 1985: Lester R. Brown (Humane Letters), Finn Brudevold (Science)
- 1986: Jane Goodall (Science), Prince Sadruddin Aga Khan (Laws)
- 1987: Claude Shannon (Science), Gloria Steinem (Humane Letters)
- 1988: Paul Samuelson (Science)
- 1989: Stephen Hawking (Science)
- 1990: Robert Ballard (Science), Juan Carlos I of Spain (Laws)
- 1991: Yo-Yo Ma (Music), Moonis Raza (Humane Letters)
- 1992: Bernard Marshall Gordon (Science)
- 1993: Carlos Fuentes (Letters)
- 1994: Ted Koppel (Humane Letters)
- 1995: Murray Gell-Mann (Science)
- 1996: Anson Chan (Humane Letters)
- 1997: Richard Holbrooke (Laws)
- 1998: Garry Trudeau (Humane Letters)
- 1999: Thomas Schmidheiny (Business Administration)
- 2000: Issam Fares (International Public Affairs)
- 2001: David McCullough (Humane Letters)
- 2002: John DiBiaggio (Letters), Eugene F. Fama (Science), Roderick MacKinnon (Science)
- 2003: Mario Molina (Science)
- 2004: Neil Armstrong (English), Tracy Chapman (Fine Arts)
- 2005: Kostas Karamanlis (Letters)
- 2006: Lynn Margulis (Science)
- 2007: Michael Bloomberg (Public Service)
- 2008: Meredith Vieira (Humane Letters)
- 2009: Leslie Gelb (Laws), Deval Patrick (Laws), Patricia Q. Stonesifer (Public Service)
- 2010: Kristina M. Johnson (Science), Ann Hobson Pilot (Music), Gordon Wood (Humane Letters)
- 2011: Charles M. Vest (Science), Geoffrey Canada (Humane Letters), Jamaica Kincaid (Humane Letters), Pierre Omidyar (Public Service), Robert Solow (Science)
- 2012: Eric Greitens (Humane Letters), Lawrence S. Bacow (Humane Letters), Bonnie Bassler (Science), Farooq Kathwari (Public Service)
- 2013: Claude Steele (Humane Letters), Lois Gibbs (Public Service), Raymond Sackler (Humane Letters)
- 2014: Anne-Marie Slaughter (Laws), James Lawson (Public Service), Jill Lepore (Humane Letters), Haruki Murakami (Letters), James D. Stern (Business Administration)
- 2015: Madeleine Albright (Laws), Joichi Ito (Humane Letters)
- 2016: Hank Azaria (Humane Letters), Janet Echelman (Fine Arts), H. Jack Geiger (Public Service), Sonia Manzano (Fine Arts)
- 2017: Kenya Barris (Humane Letters), Sean B. Carroll (Science), Maria Contreras-Sweet (Public Service), Joseph W. Polisi (Fine Arts)
- 2018: José Andrés (Public Service), Ash Carter (Laws), Ellen Kullman (Science), Risa Lavizzo-Mourey (Humane Letters), Arturo O'Farrill (Music), Farah Pandith (Laws)
- 2019: Marie Cassidy (Public Service), Edward Markey (Laws), Eva Moskowitz (Humane Letters), Ellen Ochoa (Engineering), Alfre Woodard (Fine Arts)
