= Coble (surname) =

Coble is a surname. Notable people with the surname include:

- Anna Coble, American biophysicist
- Arthur Byron Coble (1878–1966), American mathematician
- Bob Coble (born 1953), former mayor of Columbia, South Carolina, USA
- Dave Coble (1912–1971), American baseball player
- Drew Coble (born 1947), American baseball umpire
- Eric Coble, playwright and screenwriter
- Robert L. Coble (1928–1992), American materials scientist, known for Coble creep
- Howard Coble (1931–2015), U.S. Representative from North Carolina
- Paul Coble (born 1953), North Carolina politician, former mayor of Raleigh
