= Mary Thompson =

Mary Thompson may refer to:

- Mary Thompson (businesswoman) (died 1893), African American saloon and brothel owner
- Mary A. Cooke Thompson (1825–1919), women's rights activist in Oregon
- Mary Anne Thompson (1776–1852), English courtesan and memoirist, mistress of Frederick, Duke of York
- Mary C. Thompson (died 2001), American educator, Dean of Damavand College in Tehran
- Mary Clark Thompson (1835–1923), American philanthropist, wife of banker Frederick Ferris Thompson
- Mary E. Thompson (fl. 1960s–2010s), Canadian statistician
- Libby Thompson (Mary Elizabeth Thompson; 1855–1953), American brothel owner
- Te Ata (actress) (Mary Frances Thompson; 1895–1995), Chickasaw actress and storyteller
- Mary Gabrielle Thompson (born 1948), Australian politician
- Mary Harris Thompson (1829–1895), founder, head physician and surgeon of the Chicago Hospital for Women and Children
- Mary Jean Thompson (fl. 1990s–2020s), American honorary consul
- Mary Wilson Thompson (1866–1947), Delaware civic leader
- Mary Thompson (badminton), Scottish badminton player
- Mary Crutchfield Wright Thompson (1902–1985), one of the first Black women to graduate from Tufts University Dental School

== See also ==
- Mary Thompson-Jones (born 1957), Foreign Service Officer in the United States' Department of State
- Mary Thomson (disambiguation)
