= Dudney =

Dudney is a surname. Notable people with the surname include:

- Nancy Dudney (fl. 1975), American materials scientist
- William Dudney (1860–1922), English cricketer
