= Robert Coble =

Robert Coble may refer to:

- Bob Coble (born 1953), former mayor of Columbia, South Carolina
- Robert L. Coble (1928–1992), American ceramic scientist
