= Ralph Morse =

American photographer (1917–2014)

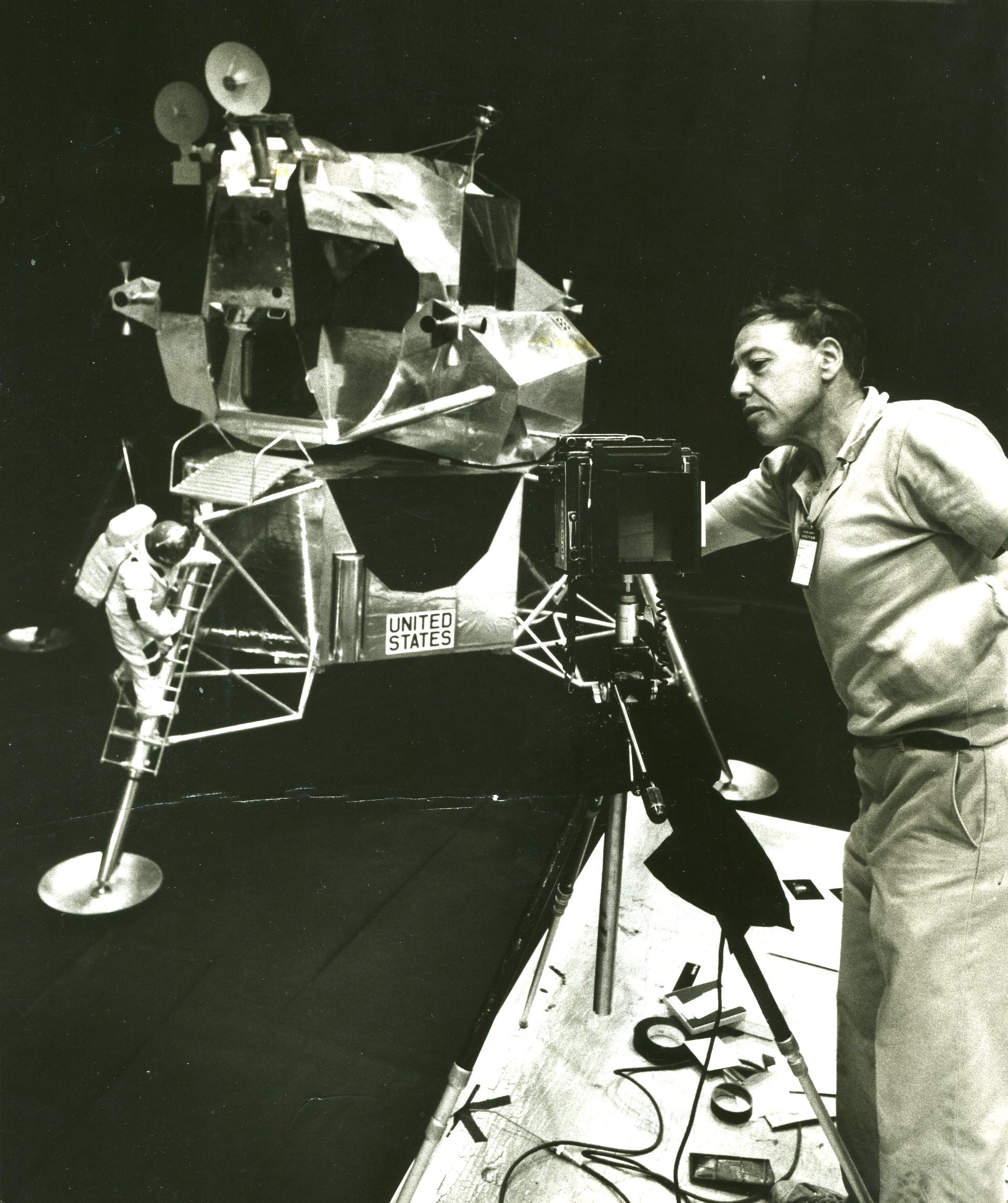
Morse photographing simulator of the Lunar Module circa 1969

Ralph Theodore Morse (October 23, 1917 – December 7, 2014) was a career staff photographer for Life magazine. He photographed some of the most widely seen pictures of World War II, the United States space program, and sports events, and was celebrated for his multiple-exposure photographs. Morse's success as an improviser led to his being considered Life magazine's specialist in technical photography. Former managing editor George P. Hunt declared that "If [the] equipment he needed didn't exist, [Morse] built it."

During his thirty years at Life, Morse covered assignments including science, theater, fads and spot news. When first hired by Life and sent to photograph World War II, he was the youngest war correspondent. His pictures documented the war's Pacific and European theatres and the post-war reconstruction of Europe. Morse was the civilian photographer at the signing of the surrender by the Germans to General Dwight Eisenhower. He was the senior staff photographer at the time when Life ceased weekly publication.

Morse photographed the NASA space program from its inception, an assignment which outlasted Life as a weekly magazine. On November 6, 2009, LIFE.com unveiled a photo retrospective of Project Mercury, America's first human spaceflight program. Most of this photo collection is credited to Morse, as he had been exclusively assigned by Life to cover the space program. Over the early decades of the space program, Morse became an insider at NASA, providing him with the privileged access which helped produce some of the most iconic images of NASA projects. On July 15, 2009, LIFE.com published a photo gallery of never-before-seen photos Morse took of Buzz Aldrin, Michael Collins, and Neil Armstrong in the days before their Apollo mission. In the gallery, Morse talks with Life about Apollo 11 and the astronauts who first landed on the moon.

Morse believed that photos lend a unique understanding to the world in which we live. Photographer Jim McNitt, who worked with Morse on several Time magazine assignments in the 1970s, described him as a fun-loving extrovert who was delighted to mentor an aspiring photojournalist. "Watching Ralph plan his shots, respond to editors, and deal with reluctant subjects with off-hand humor taught me things I couldn't learn in photo magazines or workshops," said McNitt. Former Life managing editor George P. Hunt proclaimed of Morse, "If Life could afford only one photographer, it would have to be Ralph Morse."

== Early life ==
Ralph Morse had humble roots. Born in Manhattan and raised in the Bronx area of New York City, he lived with his mother and sister in an apartment where the income was $25 a week. At fifteen, he starting working in a drug store delivering orders every afternoon, and at a soda fountain every evening until 11:00 pm, making soda and sandwiches for the public. At DeWitt Clinton High School, he joined the school newspaper and was a dedicated student of journalism.

Aspiring to become a newsreel cameraman but lacking the requisite $1,000 to join the union, Morse instead entered the City College of New York for free and took every class offered in photography. Subsequently, Morse looked up photography in the business directory called the Manhattan Redbook. Starting with "A", he went door-to-door visiting all the listings until finally being hired at "P" by Paul Parker Studio. Paul Parker was a social photographer with such customers as the United Fund and the Red Cross, a type of photography of great interest to Morse. Paul Parker had a most fascinating capability of moving lights. Morse stayed with Parker for most of a year until hearing of a job of hanging lights for George Karger, a German banker turned photographer who was freelancing through Pix Publishing, an agency in New York that sold pictures around the world. Earning $6 a week, Morse worked with Karger for six months, at which time Morse realized that he had learned all that Karger had to offer. Then a job opened at Harper's Bazaar. Morse only stayed at Harper's for a day, as he could not understand taking pictures that meant nothing to anyone outside the fashion industry.

As one who delivered photos to Pix on a daily basis, Morse was readily hired by Pix to work in their darkroom. The first weekend as a printer, Morse spent a day with friends at Jones Beach on Long Island. Not owning a camera, Morse borrowed a 35mm Contax from his friend Cornell Capa, who was also a printer in the Pix publishing lab, as well as the brother of Life photographer Robert Capa. At the beach, Morse happened upon a father throwing his baby into the air and catching him. Capturing the father and son on film, Morse immediately brought the pictures to Leon Daniel, the editor of Pix. Daniel proclaimed that Pix could sell the picture that very afternoon. Indeed, within an hour, Daniel had sold the photo to the Houston Chronicle and then sold it to about twenty other publications in the world over the following week. Morse continued working in the darkroom and continued taking pictures every weekend. Morse credits Leon Daniel as being the person who definitively encouraged him to become a professional photographer, as it was Daniel who urged Morse to just take pictures and let Pix sell them, noting that such an arrangement would be more lucrative both experientially and financially. Morse bought himself his first camera equipment and began buying The New York Times every day in order to select events to photograph, creating pictures which Daniel then sold instantly.

Of the three owners of Pix, one was a silent partner, Alfred Eisenstaedt, a photographer who had left the Associated Press in Germany to join the new Life magazine staff in New York City. Eisenstaedt closely observed Morse's photographing while encouraging Wilson Hicks, the picture editor of Life, to meet the young upstart at Pix. After weeks of Eisenstaedt's nagging, Hicks relented and asked to meet Morse. At their initial encounter, Hicks gave Morse his first assignment. Not at all sure how he would actually meet the demands of the most important picture editor in the United States, Morse covered up his fear with gratitude. Between his own and Capa's equipment, Morse was able to cover the author Thornton Wilder's acting on Broadway in his own show Our Town. The success of this assignment earned him a second—capturing on film women buying hats for their husbands in the basement of Gimbels department store—which turned out to be Morse's first photo story published by Life. As a result, Hicks offered Morse a contract to work for Life one day a week through Pix, which amounted to about ten days a month of working for Life until the start of World War II.

== War correspondent ==
At 24, Morse was the youngest war correspondent when Life hired him full-time in 1942 and sent him to the Pacific Theatre of World War II. He immediately learned that not all of his photos would end up in print, as his first war assignment turned out to be a secret mission. War coverage was the ultimate on-the-job training, needing to learn on the spot such feats as descending rope ladders overloaded with both combat and photographic gear in order to accompany troops from ship to shore. Landing with the Marines on Guadalcanal, Morse's cameras recorded America's first amphibious attack in the Pacific. He arranged for the captain of the USS Vincennes (CA-44), the Navy ship on which Morse had arrived, to deliver his film to Washington, D.C., as such pictures needed to be screened before being printed. Unfortunately, the Vincennes was torpedoed that night in the Battle of Savo Island. Morse's film and equipment went down with the ship while he trod water all night amidst destroyers dropping depth charges on submarines, fortunately scaring away the sharks and barracuda. With neither cameras nor clothing, Morse made a secret pact with Naval command to return briefly to Life in New York to re-equip, but was mandated to tell no details of the sea battle, no explanation of how he lost his equipment. Unknown to him, he was being trailed by Naval intelligence to confirm that he had kept his word. Guadalcanal grew a jungle so thick that accompanying nocturnal troop movement was filled with the risk of abandonment if one ever lost sight of the soldier's foot he was following.

During a daytime patrol, Morse came upon a burnt-out Japanese tank in a clearing with a skull and helmet on the fender. Life magazine and newspapers around the country ran Morse's photo; it proved to be the first horror picture released by the censors of World War II. Morse left the Pacific with not just an accommodation for his photo coverage from the United States Secretary of the Navy, but also with a case of malaria. Upon being healed in a New York City hospital, he was reassigned to photograph General George Patton's Army's traversing France.

He did a most comprehensive story of a wounded soldier by braving a request to the Surgeon General of the Army to certify him as wounded as well, so that he would become privy to all means of transportations, first aid stations, and hospitals as was his wounded man. Searching the battlefield between artillery shellings, he observed a corpsman as both arms were hit. Morse was witness to all the surgeries, fed him his meals, and, in time, poured penicillin into his wounds. The photos of this soldier in pain and his arms being placed in casts, considered a model of effective photojournalism, are the commonly used pictures of the wounded of World War II. Morse was witness to the invasion at Normandy, air raids in Verdun, General Charles de Gaulle's peace parade in Paris, and Hermann Göring's trial at Nuremberg. He accompanied a Frenchman by open rail and hitched rides all the way from the German concentration camp where he had been enslaved back to the dinner table with the family members from whom he had been estranged for four years. He was the civilian photojournalist present at the signing of the surrender by the Germans at Reims.

== Eighth astronaut ==
A decade after photographing the post-war reconstruction of Europe, Morse received his next singular assignment: documenting American preparations to explore outer space. He spoke to the science and managing editors of Life, recommending that one reporter and one photographer go everywhere and do everything in which the astronauts were engaged. The editors chose Morse for the job, launching a thirty-year assignment and lifelong friendships between Morse and the astronauts and their families. After years of joining the astronauts as they trained—flying weightless, diving undersea, studying rocks, surviving deserts and jungles—Morse was dubbed by them as the eighth astronaut.

Conventional photography was sufficient at the onset of Morse's coverage of the space program which began as an introduction to Life readers of the astronauts themselves and their families; however, as the program grew in complexity from Project Mercury to Gemini to Apollo, Morse needed to devise new ways to capture subject matter never before photographed. He illustrated subjects that no-one had ever seen. He did his homework, gathering the necessary knowledge to make the desired photograph. He invented his own techniques for images such as a rocket launch. He photographed double exposures, he shot with infrared cameras, he relied on motion detectors. Because he photographed with remote camera, the results were dramatic as the cameras were so close to the rockets. He positioned a six-foot man next to a thirty-seven-story missile to show its scale.

== Sports historian ==
The equipment Morse used for showing the space program served him well on his other assignments, also. When he photographed the Brooklyn Dodgers in the 1955 World Series, he brought a missile-tracking camera to the stadium. Forewarned that Jackie Robinson would try to steal home, Morse rigged the camera with a foot switch set to fire a hundred feet of film at ten frames a second. With his hand-held camera focused on the outfield, Morse triggered the foot button as soon as energy mounted between Robinson and the pitcher. When Robinson made the dash, Morse's camera was already running.

Years before, Nat Fein's Pulitzer Prize-winning picture of the back of Babe Ruth captured, as well, Morse kneeling and photographing Ruth from the front. As he stood addressing the public, and visibly weakened by cancer, Ruth leaned on his bat as a crutch. Morse chose to illustrate the somber mood of the dying hero's farewell by using color film, despite its being new and still slow in reproduction. Morse's shot of Ruth's downcast eyes with stands of fans in the background was distinctively captured in muted color tones. In response to Morse's being assigned to produce a picture that would show in one image Hank Aaron's entire 715th home run, he and fellow Life photographer Henry Groskinsky planned a multiple exposure of the pitch along with Aaron's hitting the homer, touching each base, and being congratulated by his teammates in the dugout. To make this photograph, they used a 4 X 5 view camera with strips of black paper mounted on a glass in front of the lens. As Aaron approached each of the locations to be photographed, a section of the black covering was lifted from the glass, allowing an exposure to be made.

Technically similar, in covering the hundred yard dash in New York's Madison Square Garden, Morse wanted to put the start, middle, and finish of the race in the same picture. He was able to place wiring under the track, but no place existed for situating the cameras. Morse had a hanging box built under the balcony in which he mounted his equipment. His assistant tripped the lights at the required intervals, and Morse made the photograph.

== Medical recorder ==
Morse also documented breakthroughs in the field of medicine. In response to the US Surgeon General's decree that smoking caused lung cancer, Morse obtained from the American Cancer Society the exact number of daily cancer-inducing cigarettes. Morse laid the smoked butts on a plate of glass and snapped a photo. Then he superimposed onto the same photographic plate a model silhouetted against black paper, blowing smoke out of her mouth.

Just as with the astronauts, developing friendships with the medical people he was photographing opened doors for Morse that would have been closed to others. To illustrate an article about the schism between two Houston heart surgeons, Drs. Michael DeBakey and Denton Cooley, Morse photographed each of them alone against the same dark backdrop, presumably unknown to each other, on the same frame of film. The double exposure of the dueling doctors back-to-back became a Life magazine cover.

Previously, when first photographing Dr. Cooley transplanting human hearts, Morse asked whether anyone had ever seen his own heart. Morse located a patient's recently removed heart floating in a jar of formaldehyde, and photographed Man's seeing his own heart for the first time. His previous experience with Dr. DeBakey occurred when the need for transplants outnumbered available cadaver hearts. When DeBakey was about to put a man-made left ventricle into a dying man's chest cavity for the first time, Morse requested to be present on the floor. DeBakey explained that the American Medical Association would not allow an outsider's presence in the operating room. The photograph was made when DeBakey hired Morse as a temporary hospital staff member for a dollar. In the deal, DeBakey gained ownership of the pictures, and Life had the right to publish them.

== Family life ==
Morse and the late Ruth Zizmor Morse lived in Paris after World War II while he photographed the post-war reconstruction of Europe. Later, they settled in northern New Jersey, where they raised their three sons, Alan, Bob, and Don, as Morse's work was based out of the Time-Life Building in New York City. When schedules permitted, the family joined Morse on his photographic assignments, including journeys to Cape Canaveral, Florida, to watch missiles being launched. Morse retired to south Florida where he enjoyed sailing and boating, spending time with his companion Barbara Ohlstein, his six grandchildren, and his four great-grandchildren. He died on December 7, 2014, in Delray Beach, Florida.

== Awards ==
Morse won thirty awards for his photography. He received the 1995 Joseph A. Sprague Memorial Award. According to the National Press Photographers Association, this award is the highest honor in the field of photojournalism. Morse was the recipient of the 2010 Briton Hadden Life-Time Achievement Award for his World War II photographs.

== Exhibitions ==
Edward Steichen included two of Morse's pictures in the world-touring 1955 MoMA exhibition The Family of Man; an English couple tightly embracing on a rug in a park, and children in China dancing a Ring a Ring o' Roses.
