= InsideView =

Business-to-business (B2B) data and intelligence platform

InsideView, Inc.
- Type: Private
- Industry: Software as a service
- Founded: 2005
- Headquarters: San Francisco, California
- Key people: CEO Umberto Milletti
- Products: B2B Data and Intelligence
- Revenue: $30.5 million
- Number of employees: 275
- Parent: Demandbase
- Website: http://www.insideview.com

InsideView is a software as a service (SaaS) company that gathers insights and relationships to provide analytics on marketing to customers. Founded in 2005, InsideView is mainly used by marketing, sales, and operations teams in identifying and gathering information on customers and prospects. In April 2021, the company was acquired by Demandbase, Inc.

== History ==
InsideView was founded in 2005 by Umberto Milletti, a former executive and co-founder at DigitalThink, an early web-based corporate training company. In November 2007, the company acquired competitor TrueAdvantage. After the acquisition, InsideView moved all TrueAdvantage customers over to its platform.

InsideView's core product is a business-to-business (B2B) data and intelligence platform. It facilitates marketing, sales, and operations specialists target key accounts. InsideView products are available as stand-alone web applications as well as integrated with CRM systems like Microsoft Dynamics 365, NetSuite, Oracle CRM, Salesforce.com, SAP CEC CRM (C4C), SugarCRM and Marketing Automation systems including Marketo.

On October 21, 2013, InsideView announced that it had entered into a strategic OEM agreement with Microsoft whereby InsideView was integrated into Microsoft Dynamics CRM Online. Through the agreement, InsideView was available to all users of Microsoft Dynamics CRM Online, and was known as Insights, powered by InsideView. That agreement ended in 2020 and Microsoft Dynamics customers now buy InsideView Insights directly from InsideView.

The company was named on the CRM Watchlist in 2017.

In May, 2021, InsideView became part of Demandbase, Inc.

== Competition ==
InsideView's competitors include services such as Dun & Bradstreet/Avention and ZoomInfo.
