= Kuzhikalail M. Abraham =

Indian-American chemical engineer

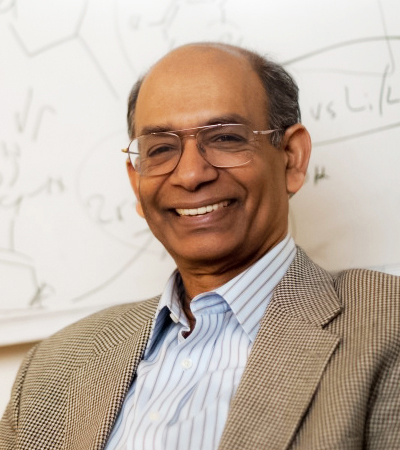
- Born: January 17, 1945; Ranny, Pathanamthitta taluk, Central Division, Travancore (modern-day Kerala, India)
- Education: Tufts University; St. Berchmans College
- Spouse: Deborah Abraham

Kuzhikalail M. Abraham is an American scientist, a recognized expert on lithium-ion and lithium-ion polymer batteries and is the inventor of the ultrahigh energy density lithium–air battery. Abraham is the principal of E-KEM Sciences in Needham, Massachusetts and a professor at the Northeastern University Center for Renewable Energy Technologies, Northeastern University, in Boston, Massachusetts.

== Early life ==
Born in 1945 as the oldest of 9 children, Abraham received his primary and secondary school education in Ranny, Kerala, India. Abraham completed his bachelors and masters in Chemistry from St. Berchmans College, Changanassery where he was the Thevercad gold medalist (awarded to the highest ranking student graduating with a B.Sc degree in Chemistry) in 1965. He received a national merit scholarship from the government of India for the M.Sc. degree studies from 1965 to 1967.

Abraham was awarded a Ph.D. in Chemistry in 1973 from Tufts University, Medford, Massachusetts. Tufts recognized him in 2017 with its Most Outstanding Achievement and Services Award for an alumnus.

Abraham conducted post-doctoral research at Vanderbilt University and the Massachusetts Institute of Technology from 1973 to 1975. He published his early research concerned with inorganic materials synthesis, NMR spectroscopy, and materials analysis and characterization.

== Career ==
Abraham is the author of more than 200 journal articles and fifteen patents on lithium and lithium-ion battery materials and performance, meeting proceedings and book chapters. His opinions on Li-ion battery materials, performance and safety aspects are sought by news organizations such as Wired Magazine (after the Boeing 787 Li-ion battery Fires), and the Chemical and Engineering News of the American Chemical Society and Wall Street Journal (on the announcement of Tesla Motors to build its Li-ion battery Giga Factory. He is also a professor in the chemistry department at Northeastern University. His contributions to lithium and lithium-ion batteries have been recognized by the Electrochemical Society by awarding him the Battery Research Award for outstanding contributions to primary and secondary lithium batteries, and election as a Fellow of the Electrochemical Society. In addition, the Electrochemical Society recognized KM's contributions to the society and to the advancement of battery technologies by hosting a podcast featuring his scientific career in its Master Series on the society website. He is also a Fellow of the Royal Society of Chemistry. The International Battery Association (IBA) recognized Abraham in 2018 with the Yeager Award for his Distinguished and Pioneering Contributions to Rechargeable Lithium Batteries.

Abraham is listed in Marquis Who's Who in America, Who is Who in the World, Who is Who in Frontiers in Science and Technology and, Who is Who in Emerging Leaders in America. Abraham was recognized by The Kerala Center, a social organization located in Elmont, New York with the Outstanding Achievement Award for Applied Science in 2011. In 2021, he was recognized with the New England Choice Awards in the category of Academia & Innovation.

Abraham served as chair of the Battery Division and a member of board of directors of the Electrochemical Society from 2006 to 2008. He was previously vice chair, secretary and treasurer of the battery division of the Electrochemical Society from 2000 to 2006 and served as chair of its Battery Research Award Committee in 2009. Abraham was also chair, vice chair, secretary and treasurer of the Boston Local Section of the Electrochemical Society from 1983 to 1987.

He is a member of the American Chemical Society, Royal Society of Chemistry, Sigma Xi9, and Electrochemical Society. He is also a member of board of governors of the Kerala Development and Innovation Council (K-DISC) in its inaugural organization formed in March 2018.

Abraham is a pioneer in the research and development of rechargeable lithium and lithium-ion batteries. His research to demonstrate a practical rechargeable lithium battery began in the late nineteen seventies when no such rechargeable batteries existed. He and his colleagues pursuant to the development of stable electrolytes to recharge the lithium electrode demonstrated one of the first sealed high capacity rechargeable lithium battery exhibiting several hundred charge/discharge cycles, a feat not accomplished until that time. This work was the forerunner to the commercially successful Li-ion batteries. Another contribution of Abraham and his colleagues involved the development of highly conductive gel polymer electrolytes and those supported on micro-porous polymer membranes. Today such separator-embedded gel polymer electrolytes are used to build the commercially successful lithium-ion polymer batteries. Other pioneering contributions of Abraham include rechargeable sodium battery chemical couples that operate at moderately high temperatures, the very high energy density non-aqueous lithium-sulfur battery, the ultrahigh energy density non-aqueous lithium-air battery, and the fundamental principles underlying the concept of chemical over charge protection of rechargeable lithium and Li-ion batteries. The research and development of lithium-air batteries is pursued world-wide for portable power, electric vehicles and large scale energy storage. His unique background encompasses both the fundamental science and engineering development of advanced batteries.

In 2022 Dr. Abraham established an endowment fund at his alma mater, St. Berchmans College, Changanassery, Kerala. The fund was used to build a Smart Class room in the chemistry department in honor of Kuzhikalayil Family, and for Scholarships to needy undergraduate students.

== Books ==
- M. Winter, K. M. Abraham, D. H. Doughty, Z. Ogumi, N. J. Dudney (2010). Rechargeable Lithium-ion Batteries. Electrochemical Society. ISBN 978-1-60768-160-1
- B. Scrosati, K. M. Abraham, W. A. van Schalkwijk, J. Hassoun (2013). Lithium Batteries: Advanced Technologies and Applications. John Wiley & Sons Inc. ISBN 978-1-118-18365-6
- M. Doyle, E. Takeuchi, K. M. Abraham (2001). Rechargeable Lithium Batteries: Proceedings of the International Symposium. Electrochemical Society. ISBN 1-56677-288-5
- K.M. Abraham, High Power batteries for Hybrid EV and Portable Power (2009), The Electrochemical Society, ISBN 1-56677-690-2
- A. Manthiram, K. M. Abraham, J. Xu, T. Abe, J.-I. Yamaki, Rechargeable Lithium and Lithium Ion Batteries, The Electrochemical Society (2009) ISBN 978-1-56677-704-9
- K. Zaghib, T. Duong, J. Prakash, A. Landgrebe, K. M. Abraham, I. B. Weinstock, Characterization and Prevention of Failure Modes of Lithium Ion Batteries in Transportation (2008) ISBN 978-1-56677-599-1
