= Sara Murray Jordan =

American gastroenterologist

- Born: Sara Murray; October 20, 1884; Newton, Massachusetts
- Died: November 21, 1959 (aged 75); Marblehead, Massachusetts
- Occupation: Gastroenterologist

Sara Murray Jordan (October 20, 1884 – November 21, 1959) was an American gastroenterologist and former president of the American Gastroenterological Association. She practiced largely in Boston and specialized in peptic ulcer disease and gastric cancer.

== Early life ==
Sara Murray was born in Newton, Massachusetts, in 1884. Her father, Patrick Andrew Murray, was an Irish carriage-repair worker, while her mother, Maria Stuart, was of English and Scottish heritage. Sara Murray enrolled at Radcliffe College in 1901 and received a bachelor's degree in the classics in 1904. Although she aspired to study medicine, her parents dissuaded her, and so she completed a PhD in classical philology and archaeology at the Ludwig-Maximilians-Universität München. She graduated in 1908 and her thesis, titled A Study of the Life of Andres, the Fool for the Sake of Christ, was published in 1910. She married Sebastian Jordan, a German lawyer, in 1913. Their daughter, Mary Stuart Jordan, was born in 1914, and Murray returned to the United States upon the outbreak of the First World War. She divorced Jordan in 1921.

== Medical career ==
In 1917, Jordan decided to enroll in medical school; she was accepted into the Tufts University School of Medicine on probation under the agreement that she would study chemistry and zoology courses in addition to medicine. When her probation was not lifted despite her having completed the required extra courses, she called for an investigation by the American Medical Association (AMA) and her probation was lifted. As a student, she performed research on thyroid disease with Frank Lahey, and they co-authored a scientific paper before Jordan graduated in 1921.

Jordan completed her internship at Worcester Memorial Hospital before moving to Chicago to train in gastroenterology with Bertram Welton Sippy at Rush Medical College. After finishing her training, she opened a private practice in Brookline, Massachusetts. In 1923, she joined Lahey at his nascent Boston-based Lahey Clinic, where she was the head gastroenterologist. She was appointed to the editorial board of the Journal of Digestive Diseases and Nutrition in 1934, which was at the time the official publication of the American Gastroenterological Association (AGA). She was elected president of the AGA in 1942, becoming the first woman to fill the position, and continued for a second term in 1943. She was involved in the AMA Section of Gastroenterology from 1941 to 1948 and was elected to the Boston Chamber of Commerce in 1948.

Jordan specialized in treating peptic ulcer disease and gastric cancer. She promoted medical rather than surgical interventions, and often recommended conservative therapy based on "diet, recreation, and rest" to her patients. She treated a number of celebrity patients, including The New Yorker founder Harold Ross, who encouraged Jordan to co-write a cookbook with culinary journalist Sheila Hibben. The result, Good Food for Bad Stomachs, was published in 1951.

== Later life and death ==
After retiring from medical practice in 1958, Jordan wrote a newspaper column titled "Health and Happiness". She lived with her second husband, Penfield Mower, a stockbroker whom she married in 1935, in Marblehead, Massachusetts. She diagnosed herself with colon cancer, the disease that led to her death on November 21, 1959, at age 75.
