= Mary Thomson =

Mary Thomson may refer to:

- Mary King (equestrian) (née Thomson, born 1961), British Olympic equestrian sportswoman
- Mary Thomson (1767–1847), Scottish-born Canadian settler
- David and Mary Thomson Collegiate Institute

== See also ==
- Mary Thompson (disambiguation)
- Thomson (disambiguation)
