= Noah Wilson-Rich =

American biologist (born 1980)

Dr. Noah Wilson-Rich
- Born: Noah Wilson-Rich; 5 May 1980 (age 46); Manhattan, United States
- Education: Northeastern University; Tufts University
- Occupations: Biologist; Entrepreneur; Author
- Years active: 2010- present
- Known for: Urban beekeeping
- Title: Founder at The Best Bees Company, Urban Bee Lab, and The Biodiversity Lab

Noah Wilson-Rich (born 5 May 1980) is an American biologist, author, and entrepreneur. He is known for his work in pollinator health, urban ecology, and biodiversity research. He is the founder of The Best Bees Company, an urban beekeeping and environmental consulting firm established in 2010, and the founder of Urban Bee Lab, a nonprofit research organization launched in 2014. Through these initiatives, he has developed models that combine urban beekeeping with scientific research and environmental monitoring. He is also the founder and CEO of the Biodiversity Lab, established in 2025, which focuses on applied biodiversity solutions and environmental data systems.

Wilson-Rich pursued undergraduate studies in biology at Northeastern University and later earned a Ph.D. in biology from Tufts University in 2011. He gained relevance during the emergence of colony collapse disorder, he contributed to broader efforts to understand the causes of pollinator decline. His work also included the development of data-driven approaches to monitoring ecosystems, including the use of environmental DNA (eDNA) to assess biodiversity and environmental health.

== Biography ==
Wilson-Rich was born on 5 May 1980 in Manhattan, New York, and raised in Fairfield, Connecticut. He pursued undergraduate studies in biology at Northeastern University, where he developed an interest in sociobiology under the mentorship of biologist Rebeca Rosengaus, earning a degree in 2005.

During his early career, he worked as a phlebotomist at Boston Children's Hospital from 2003 to 2008. His academic focus shifted toward behavioral ecology and social insects following his research on host–parasite interactions in termites at Northeastern University in 2007.

In 2005, he began doctoral studies in biology at Tufts University under the supervision of behavioral ecologist Philip Starks. His research focused on honeybee immunity, particularly methods for measuring immune response using melanization as an indicator of health. He completed his Ph.D. in 2011.

== Academic career ==
Wilson-Rich's research gained significance during the emergence of Colony Collapse Disorder (CCD) in 2006, a phenomenon associated with large-scale losses of honeybee populations across North America and Europe. His work contributed to understanding how pathogens, parasites, environmental stressors, and agricultural practices affect bee health.

He explored approaches to strengthening bee immunity, including the use of probiotics and dietary supplements to improve resistance to disease. His research also examined how environmental conditions influence pollinator resilience.

In 2009, he received an award from Dow Chemical's Student Sustainability Challenge in recognition of his research on honeybee immunity.

Between 2011 and 2014, he held adjunct faculty positions in biology at Simmons College and Tufts University, where he taught courses including microbiology and behavioral biology. In 2014, he briefly served as adjunct faculty at Northeastern University, where he created and lectured a course on evolution.

Wilson-Rich later became a research affiliate at the MIT Media Lab from 2015 to 2022, collaborating with the Mediated Matter research group. His work included experimental studies on honeybee behavior in controlled environments and exploratory projects involving bees in space-related research contexts.

== The Best Bees Company ==
In 2010, Wilson-Rich founded The Best Bees Company in Boston, Massachusetts. The company originated as a practical solution to fund his research on honey bee health at a time when traditional academic funding was limited. From its inception, the company combined commercial beekeeping services with data collection. This model allowed the company to function simultaneously as a service provider and a research platform. The company provides urban beekeeping services, including the installation and management of beehives on residential, commercial, and institutional properties across the United States.

The Best Bees Company continues its scientific mission through ongoing data collection and collaborations with institutions such as MIT, Harvard University, and NASA on pollinator research and environmental data analysis. In 2014, Wilson-Rich launched the Urban Bee Lab, an associated non-profit that seeks to make research funding, partnerships, and data more publicly accessible. In 2015, the Best Bees Company introduced a HoneyDNA kit product which uses environmental DNA (eDNA) to analyze hive health, foraging patterns, and local biodiversity.

Dr. Wilson-Rich served as the CEO for the Best Bees company from its inception through 2025.

== The Biodiversity Lab ==
In 2025, Wilson-Rich founded The Biodiversity Lab, a privately held environmental consulting firm focused on biodiversity strategy, monitoring, and reporting in the built environment.

According to the firm's public materials, its core method, called the Biodiversity Blueprint, combines landscape consulting, environmental sensors, environmental DNA (eDNA), and AI-driven software dashboards to help organizations measure and manage biodiversity on properties such as corporate campuses, data centers, sports venues, and green roofs.

The Biodiversity Lab followed Wilson-Rich's earlier work through The Best Bees Company and Urban Bee Lab, which had already used honey sampling, biodiversity data, and institutional partnerships in pollinator-health research. A November 2025 event hosted by MIT described the new firm as an expansion of that work into strategic consulting for communities and organizations at the intersection of science, sustainability, and impact.

== Publications ==
- The Bee: A Natural History (2014)
