= William Dudney =

English cricketer

Personal information
- Full name: William Hudson Dudney
- Born: 8 January 1860; Portslade, Sussex, England
- Died: 16 June 1922 (aged 62); Aldrington, Sussex, England
- Batting: Right-handed
- Role: Batsman, wicket-keeper

Domestic team information
- Years: Team
- 1883-84: Canterbury
- 1887 to 1893: Sussex

Career statistics
| Competition | First-class |
|---|---|
| Matches | 36 |
| Runs scored | 912 |
| Batting average | 14.47 |
| 100s/50s | 0/2 |
| Top score | 97 |
| Catches/stumpings | 38/6 |
- Source: Cricinfo, 26 September 2018

William Hudson Dudney (8 January 1860 – 16 June 1922) was an English cricketer active from 1883 to 1893 who played for Canterbury in New Zealand and Sussex in England. He was born in Brighton and died in Hove. He appeared in 36 first-class matches as a right-handed batsman and wicketkeeper.

== Life and career ==
Dudney was educated at Cranleigh School, and later spent a southern summer season in New Zealand. Arriving in spring 1883, he played as a batsman for Canterbury in the 1883–84 season, when he was the highest-scoring batsman in New Zealand, with 208 runs in six first-class matches at an average of 18.90. He returned to England after the season. At his Christchurch club, Midland Canterbury, he was considered "one of the most brilliant and effective batsmen who has joined [the club] in many years", as well as a fine fieldsman.

Dudney later played irregularly for Sussex, mostly as a wicketkeeper-batsman, between 1887 and 1893. His highest score was 97, the highest score of the match, when Sussex followed on against Kent in 1887.

In 1911 Dudney was living with his mother, two sisters, a female cousin and four female servants in Haywards Heath, his occupation given as "private means". When he died in June 1922 he left an estate of more than £11,000 to family members.
