= Jay Byrne =

American writer and government official

Jay Byrne (born 1962) is an American writer, former senior government official and entrepreneur. Byrne is president and founder of v-Fluence, a public relations and reputation management firm. He is a frequent public speaker on the use of the Internet and has published several articles on new media and communications. He is a contributing author to Let Them Eat Precaution published by the American Enterprise Institute.

== Career ==
As former political campaign operative Byrne is credited with executing a range of aggressive communications tactics, including the 1992 presidential campaign's Chicken George attack on George H. W. Bush. Byrne was Deputy Assistant Administrator for Legislative and Public Affairs at the U.S. Agency for International Development (USAID) in the Clinton Administration from 1993 to 1997. During this time he also served as a White House spokesperson for numerous presidential and administration foreign policy initiatives including the 1994 G7 Jobs Summit and the Greater Horn of Africa Famine Initiative. Prior to joining USAID Byrne held communication positions on the Clinton-Gore presidential campaign, for Boston Mayor Raymond Flynn and for Congressman Joseph Patrick Kennedy II (D-MA).

After serving in the Clinton Administration, Byrne headed up corporate communications for Monsanto Company from 1997 to 2001. As Monsanto's director of corporate communications, Byrne focused on building acceptance for the company's controversial genetically modified crops. After leaving Monsanto, Byrne founded the reputation management firm v-Fluence through which he led efforts to counter opposition to products created by agrochemical companies. According to a lawsuit against the agrochemical firm Syngenta, Byrne and v-Fluence helped to suppress information about links between Syngenta's herbicide paraquat and the development of Parkinson's disease. The lawsuit also claims that Byrne and v-Fluence helped to "neutralize" critics of the herbicide. In 2014, v-Fluence launched a private social network called Bonus Eventus. According to investigative reports by Lighthouse Reports, The Guardian, Le Monde and others, the purpose of Bonus Eventus is to act as a platform for coordinating attacks against pesticide critics.

Born in Boston, Massachusetts, Byrne attended St. John's Preparatory School and graduated from Tufts University.

== Books ==
- Byrne, Jay; et al. (2005). Let Them Eat Precaution: How Politics Is Undermining The Genetic Revolution in Agriculture. AEI Press. ISBN 0-8447-4200-7.

== Other publications ==
- Byrne, Jay (2007). Blogs & Beyond: A guide to understanding and engaging consumer-generated media outlets. Association of Cable Communicators: ACC Briefs.
- Byrne, Jay (2007). New Search Trends Affect Online PR & Marketing Efforts. O'Dwyers: Public Relations Report.
- Byrne, Jay (2003). Attack of the Killer Labels. Public Relations Society Press: PR Reporter Magazine.
- Byrne, Jay (1999). When You're Serious About Culture Change. Ragan Press: Journal of Employee Communications.
- Byrne, Jay (1999). Empowering People, Improving Profits and Breaking Barriers. Phillips Publishing: PR News Journal.
- Byrne, Jay (1999). How Internal Communications Transforms a Culture. Ragan Press: Journal of Communications Management.
