= Soichiro Minami =

Japanese businessman

- Born: Soichiro Minami; 1975 or 1976 (age 48–49)
- Education: B.A. Tufts University
- Known for: Founder and chairman of Visional

Soichiro Minami (born 1975/1976) is a Japanese businessman and billionaire who founded job search and human resources software firm Visional.

He is a graduate of Tufts University with a double major in economics and international relations. Minami lives in Tokyo, Japan.

Forbes lists his net worth as of April 2022 at $1.1 billion USD.
