= Robert Kayen =

American Civil Engineer

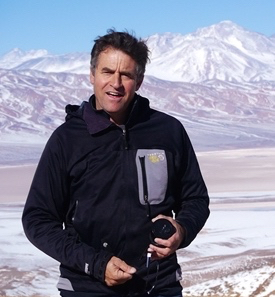
- Born: May 20, 1959 (age 67); New York
- Education: Tufts University
- Awards: Amer. Soc. Civil Engineers Thomas Middlebrooks Award, Ames Award - NASA-Ames Research Center, Commendation Award - U.S. Department of Justice
- Scientific career
- Fields: Civil Engineering, Earth Science
- Workplaces: University of California, Berkeley
- Doctoral advisor: James K. Mitchell

Robert Kayen is a civil engineer, geologist, and Professor at the University of California, Berkeley in the Department of Civil and Environmental Engineering. He is a leading international expert in the fields of earthquake engineering, seismic soil liquefaction, and seismic displacement analysis of ground failures. Kayen's research focuses on geotechnical engineering, engineering characterization of natural hazards and extreme events, and earth science aspects of civil engineering. His works have been applied in earthquake engineering design of improved ground, building foundations, bridge abutments, lifeline networks, and environmental systems.

== Education and academia ==
Robert Kayen was born in New York, NY, United States in 1959. He earned his B.S. in civil engineering and geology in 1981 from Tufts University, M.S. degree in geology in 1988, and Ph.D. in engineering under the supervision of James K. Mitchell at the University of California, Berkeley in California in 1993. From 1991-2023, he has worked as a research scientist at the U.S. Geological Survey in Menlo Park, California. Kayen joined the faculty of Civil and Environmental Engineering at the University of California, Los Angeles in 2007, and the faculty of the University of California, Berkeley in 2018. He previously served as a visiting professor at Kobe University, Japan. Kayen has authored over four hundred journal articles, conference papers, and published studies in the fields of earthquake engineering, LIDAR geomatics, InSAR persistent scatterer-synthetic aperture radar interferometry, engineering geophysics, methane hydrate disassociation, and marine-engineering geology and marine-geotechnics.

== Honors ==
Kayen received the Thomas A. Middlebrooks Award from the American Society of Civil Engineers. For contributions as a court-appointed expert to the scientific studies supporting United States vs. Montrose Chemical Corp. et al., he received a Commendation awarded by the United States Department of Justice. He received the NASA Ames Honor Award from the NASA Ames Research Center for applications of the spectral analysis of surface waves and ground-penetrating RADAR. Kayen has served on several editorial boards including the Journal of Geotechnical and Geoenvironmental Engineering of the American Society of Civil Engineers (ASCE).

== Rock climbing and ski mountaineering ==
Robert Kayen is an American rock climber who completed the first solo ascent of El Capitan's West Buttress in Yosemite National Park in 1982. The eleven-day solo ascent followed the original route on the West Buttress, first climbed by Layton Kor and Steve Roper. Kayen completed the first winter traverse of the Sierra Nevada mountains along 400 miles (640 kilometers) from Mount Whitney to Lake Tahoe in 1984 and 1985, skiing via the John Muir Trail and the high-elevation portions of the Tahoe–Yosemite Trail.
