= Anthony Cortese =

American health and environmental official (born 1947)

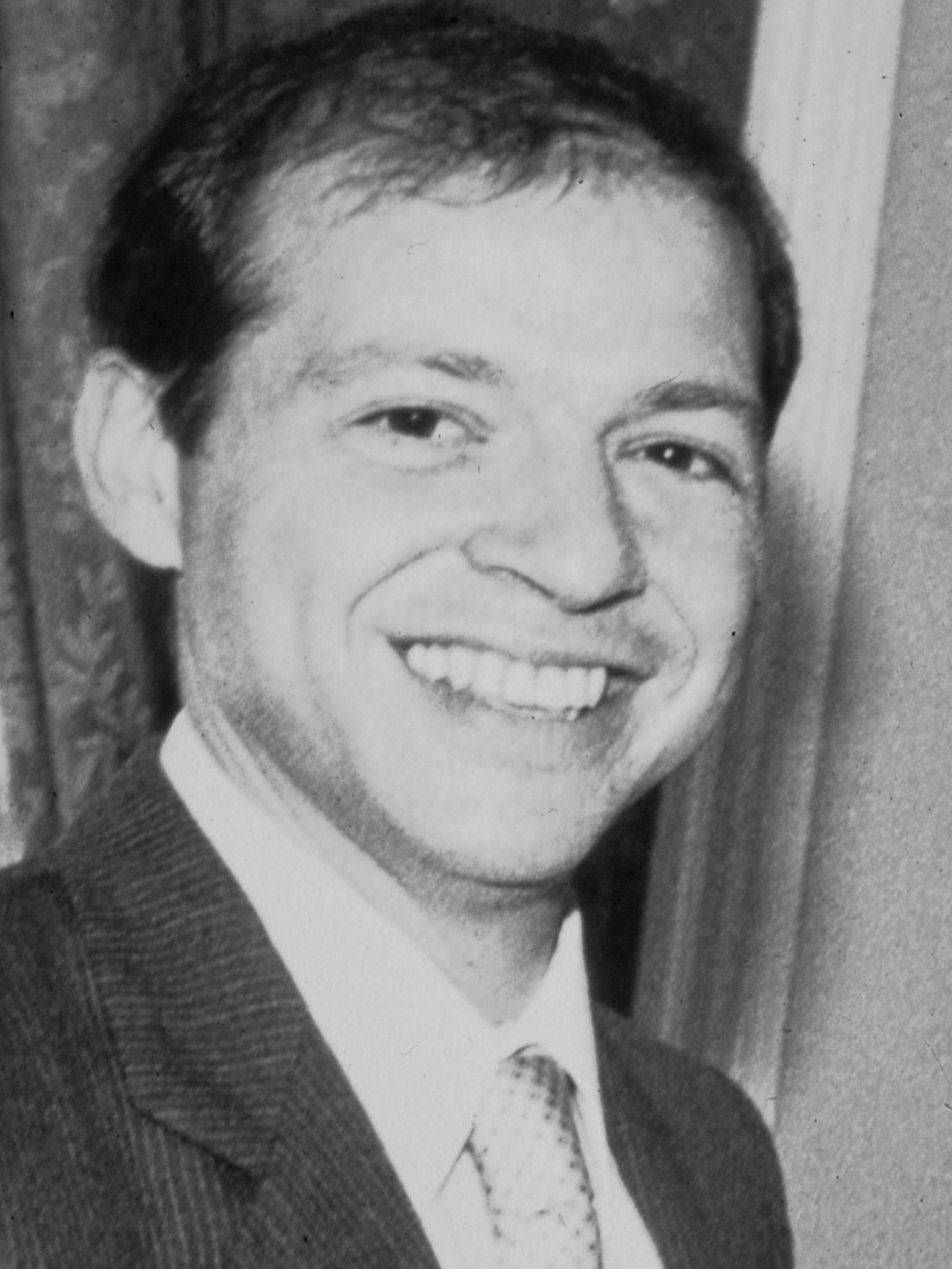

Commissioner of the Massachusetts Department of Environmental Protection
- In office 1979–1984
- Governor: Edward J. King; Michael Dukakis

Director of the Air Quality Program for the Massachusetts Department of Environmental Protection
- In office 1976–1978

Personal details
- Born: January 26, 1947 (age 79) Winthrop, Massachusetts, U.S.
- Education: Tufts University; Harvard School of Public Health
- Known for: Environmental literacy
- Awards: Phi Beta Kappa
- Scientific career
- Fields: Environmental Health
- Workplaces: United States Public Health Service; Department of Environmental Protection; Tufts University; Second Nature

Anthony Cortese (born January 26, 1947) is an American activist who has been active in academic and industrial support of environmental awareness.

Cortese was raised in the north end of Boston and received his high school education at Boston Latin High School before entering Tufts University in 1964. Following his graduation he was employed by the United States Public Health Service. He received a master's degree from Tufts University in 1972. He graduated with a doctoral degree in Environmental Health Sciences from the Harvard School of Public Health in 1976.

He was appointed director of the Air Quality Program for the Massachusetts Department of Environmental Protection from 1976 to 1978. He became Commissioner of the Massachusetts Department of Environmental Protection for the Commonwealth of Massachusetts in 1979 and continued in that position until 1984, through the terms of Governors Michael Dukakis and Edward J. King. The 1970s were a time of awakening for environmental protection and during his tenure the first acid rain regulations were developed, serving as a model for New England and eastern Canada.

In 1984 he became the Director of the Center for Environmental Management at Tufts University, and in 1989 he was named the dean of a newly created Environmental Program at the same university. During his tenure this program established the first program in environmental literacy, a partnership between the university and industry. The most novel feature of this program was the incorporation of environmental literacy into the curricula of a broad spectrum of academic programs. Tufts University received the only Presidential Citation for development of this program in 1990.

In 1993, Cortese, Senator John Kerry, and Teresa Heinz established Second Nature, a non-profit organization focused on making environmental sustainability a foundation of all learning and practice, i.e. teaching a balance between production and consumption in a way that preserves the delicate balance of nature. This organization has become an advocate for teaching sustainability at all institutions of higher learning through its incorporation into the curriculum. An important contribution Cortese made was the establishment of the American College & University Presidents' Climate Commitment, an organization of more than 600 colleges and universities in every state and the District of Columbia who have committed to take action on climate and prepare students through research and education to solve the climate challenges of the 21st century. He served as President of Second Nature from its establishment in March 1993 through August 2012—a period of almost 20 years.

In 2012 he became a principal of Sustainable Visions, LLC, a frequent consultant to higher education, industry and non-profit organizations on establishment of sustainability principles and programs. He is the co-coordinator of the Intentional Endowments Network that supports colleges, universities, and other mission-driven tax-exempt organizations in aligning their endowment investment practices with their mission, values, and sustainability goals.

Cortese also joined the Board of Trustees of Green Mountain College in Poultney, Vermont, in 2008, a college focused on development of environmental sustainability, and in 2018 was named chairman of the board of trustees.

In addition, he is a Fellow of the American Association for the Advancement of Science. He served as a trustee of Tufts University and was a founding member of the board of directors of The Natural Step US and of the Environmental Business Council of New England. He has been a consultant to UNEP, a member of the EPA Science Advisory Board, President Clinton's Council on Sustainable Development's Education Task Force and a Woodrow Wilson Fellow for Higher Education.
