= Anna Coble =

American biophysicist

- Born: 1936
- Died: March 3, 2009 (aged 72–73)
- Education: Howard University; University of Illinois at Urbana–Champaign

Anna Jane Coble-Mullen (1936 – March 3, 2009) was an American biophysicist. She was the first black woman to earn a doctorate in biophysics, and the first black woman to be hired at Howard University.

== Early life and education ==
Coble was born in Raleigh, North Carolina, where she became interested in mathematics and physics. Her father was a teacher at St. Augustine's University. Coble studied mathematics at Howard University, earning a bachelor's degree in 1958 and a master's degree in 1961. After graduating, she taught physics at North Carolina A&T State University for four years. Coble moved to University of Illinois at Urbana–Champaign for her postgraduate studies, where she became an advocate for minority students and women. She completed her PhD in 1973 under the supervision of Floyd Dunn. She spent two years at Washington University in St. Louis studying the impact of high-intensity ultrasound on frogs.

== Research and career ==
Coble moved back to Howard University, where she was the first black woman to be hired to the faculty. She spent a summer finding houses for 200 black graduate students, forfeiting her own research. During her time at Howard University there was a 30 - 40% cut to federal research grants. She was part of the Writing Across the Curriculum faculty. She was eventually promoted to Associate Professor.

Coble was part of the formation of the National Society of Black Physicists. She served on the board of the Ionia Whipper Home, a shelter for neglected teenage girls. She developed educational resources for the National Academy of Sciences and the National Research Council.

Coble worked with the American Association for the Advancement of Science and American Association of Physics Teachers to support underrepresented groups in science. One project, the AAAS Black Church Project, brought hands-on science to young people in the Washington Area. The Gamma chapter of the District of Columbia of Phi Beta Kappa at Howard University established a Faculty Service Award in honor of Coble, who was the Chapter Secretary for multiple decades.

== Publications ==
A Study of the Effects of Intense Non-Cavitating Ultrasound on Frog Skin

Reversible changes in the electrical parameters of isolated frog skin induced by ultrasound

== Personal life ==
Coble was married to Kirk P. Mullen. She was the stepdaughter of Cora Coble, and had three siblings: Mary Lee Coble, Cecil N. Coble, Jr. and Dennis Coble. Anna Coble died on March 3, 2009. She is buried at Lincoln Memorial Cemetery.

== See also ==
- Timeline of women in science
