= Han Bi-ya =

- Born: 26 June 1958 (age 68); Seoul, South Korea
- Education: Master's degree
- Alma mater: Tufts University; University of Utah; Hongik University
- Occupations: Activist, writer
- Employer: World Vision

Korean name
- Hangul: 한비야
- Hanja: 韓飛野
- RR: Han Biya
- MR: Han Piya

Han Bi-ya (Korean: 한비야; born 26 June 1958) is a South Korean travel writer, relief worker and poverty reduction, refugee advocate. She has published a number of best-selling travel books and lead the Emergency Relief Team for World Vision Korea. She is one of the top celebrities of impact in South Korea according to Hankyoreh and one of the most respected Koreans in a 2009 poll of university students. In August 2009, she stopped to work in World Vision to study the theories concerning humanitarian work and support at Tufts University's Friedman School of Nutrition Science and Policy.

== Biography ==
=== Education ===
Han Bi-ya attended Seungeui Girls' High School (숭의여자고등학교) in Seoul. She studied English literature at Hongik University and completed graduate studies at the University of Utah. In 2009, she studied at the Fletcher School of Law and Diplomacy, Tufts University.

=== Travels ===
Han Bi-ya first became known for her travel books. She wrote a four-volume best seller, Daughter of the Wind: Three and a Half Times Around the Globe on Foot, an account of her seven-year (1993–1999) travels around the world. Han had quit a profitable and high-status job at Burson-Marsteller, a global public relations and communications firm, and jumped into what she liked most.

Han explored the world, especially many isolated regions, alone and on foot, rarely taking flights. Also, her explorations were not like ordinary trips in that she actually stayed in local people's home as many times as possible and truly experienced the local culture. In some countries like Afghanistan, it is sometimes very difficult and dangerous, especially for a woman, to talk to a local man and stay in his home. In the book, Han states that she put herself in hazardous situations and was fortunate to survive. These adventurous and vivid stories fascinate readers.

Her travel inspired her to devote her life to helping refugees as a volunteer worker. During her ventures to the world, Han Bi-ya experienced the awakening moment. She realized that the world is not a Global Village, but a "Global House".

However, Han Bi-ya has said that she would no longer travel, even though travel led her to discover the meaning of her life. She received enough joy from travel and now something else makes her heart beat, helping refugees.

=== Emergency relief works ===
Han Bi-ya has been a World Vision Korea Emergency Relief Team Leader since 2001 to stop her work by August 2009 for studying humanitarian supports and relief and has been promoting international awareness of the world's refugee crises. She has been active in Asia, Africa, Middle East, Eastern Europe, Central and South America. Han Bi-ya said that her refugee relief activities have helped her realize the urgent need to develop diverse mechanisms for preventing wars and conflicts around the world. She hopes she can come up with an idea to deal with international affairs in the future through the experiences in relief activities.

Her book, March to the World, Off the Map explains several sadness and smiles upon her work around the world. Recently, she appeared on one TV show to explain her joy and life of work. At the show, she became the first person to explain the ceremony of circumcision to viewers of Korea, held widely in Africa as a rite of passage.

=== Inspiration ===
Han Bi-ya has said that "The happiest person is someone who is on the spot, doing what he or she really wants to do and braveness comes when you don't have fear in trying something, and the degree of braveness varies according to how eagerly you wish to do it. If you find a thing which you think you can die for, nothing can stop you."

Han Bi-ya added that she followed her own "timetable for life," without comparing it with others. She tries whatever she likes at any age.

Han Bi-ya has been an important figure for young people in Korea. Many young women have started to go on backpacking trips, following her routes.

Han's books focus on humanitarianism and global engagement, aimed at young readers

== Effect ==
=== International relief ===
Based on the 2005 World Vision overseas donation, which has increased since the "March to the World, Off the Map" published in 2005, it has produced relief team members and cooperated with WFP (World Food Program).

=== Global Citizenship School ===
She started the World Vision Global Citizenship School with an advertising fee of 100 million won, and then donated 100 million won of the book "That Was Love". In addition, she has been providing audio guides at the Global Citizenship Education Center in Seoul Land. In 2011, she became the first Principal of the World Citizenship School.

=== Educator ===
After publishing "March to the World, Off the Map", she began public lecture activities. In 2012, she was appointed as a visiting professor at the Graduate School of International Studies at Ewha Womans University.

== Bibliography ==
- I finally found someone to walk with (2022)
- March to the World, Off the Map (2005)
- Travel to China of Han Biya (2001)
- Daughter of the Wind, Three and a Half Times Around the Globe on Foot (2000)
  - Volume 1 – Africa, the Middle East, Central Asia
  - Volume 2 – Central and South America, Alaska
  - Volume 3 – Indochina peninsula, South Asia
  - Volume 4 – Mongolia, China, Tibet
- Daughter of the Wind, A journey round Korea (1999)

== Awards ==
- Youth Leader in Korea (YWCA), 2004
- One of the "100 people brightening the world" (Korea Green Foundation)

== See also ==
- World Vision
- Humanitarian aid
