= Joseph Igersheimer =

German ophthalmologist

- Born: 1879
- Died: 1965 (aged 85–86)
- Known for: arsphenamine for the treatment of syphilis
- Scientific career
- Fields: Ophthalmology
- Workplaces: Tufts University

Joseph Igersheimer (1879–1965) was a German born ophthalmologist known for his work on arsphenamine for the treatment of syphilis. A Jew, after escaping the Nazis, While in forced exile from Nazi Germany between 1933 and 1939, Joseph Igersheimer was the architect of modern ophthalmology in Turkey. Earlier he was a pioneer in addressing the impact of syphilis on eyesight. He was the first to use arsphenamine in the treatment of syphilis of the eye and the first to operate on retinal detachment by closing the holes. In 1939 he joined the faculty of Tufts University School of Medicine and became a major contributor to America's ophthalmology.
