= Mary Thompson (businesswoman) =

American businesswoman

Mary E. Thompson (died 1892) was one of the richest early African Americans in Seattle, Washington. She owned the Minnehaha Saloon, located at 319 Jackson street, which had a brothel upstairs.

Thompson is reported to have died in Oakland, California. At the time of her death she owned real estate in Seattle and Butte, Montana. She also had a horse and carriage, an extensive jewellery collection, and $20,000 in cash. By the standards of the time, this made her quite wealthy.

Following Thompson's death, the Minnehaha Saloon was torn down in April 1894.
