= Farah Pandith =

American academic (born 1968)

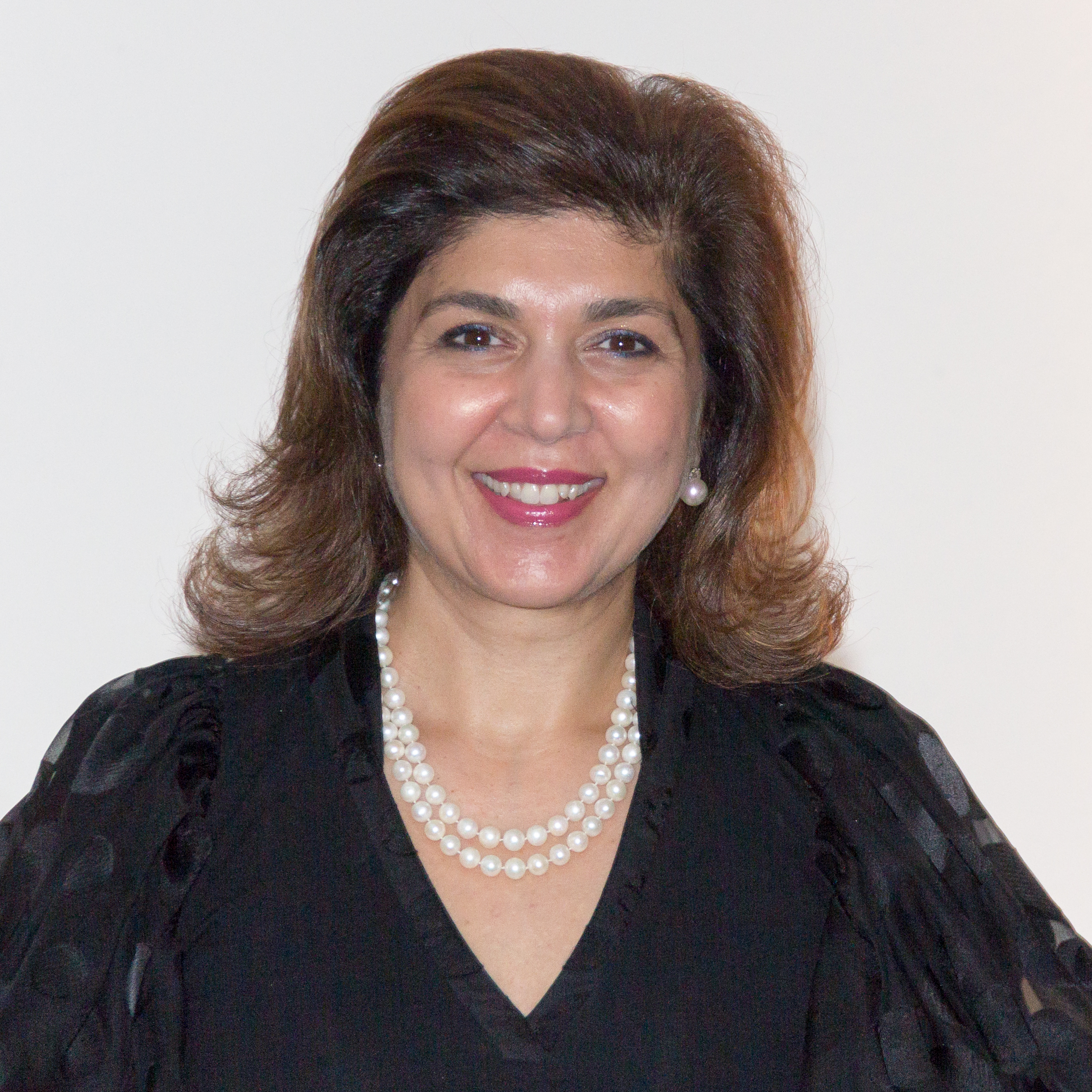
- Born: January 13, 1968 (age 58); Srinagar, J&K, India
- Education: Smith College (BA); Tufts University (MA)
- Known for: Special Representative to Muslim Communities for the United States Department of State; Adjunct Senior Fellow of Council on Foreign Relations
- Website: Official website

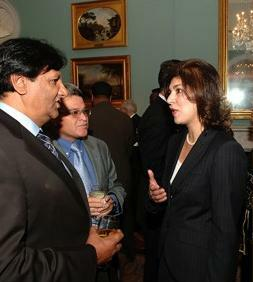
Farah Pandith, 2007

Farah Pandith (born January 13, 1968) is an American academic. She was appointed the first-ever Special Representative to Muslim Communities in June 2009 by Secretary of State Hillary Rodham Clinton. The position was made specifically for her after she briefed Secretary Clinton about her work in the Bush administration. She had the rare distinction of being a political appointee for two Republican presidents and President Obama. When she was the Special Representative she traveled to almost 100 countries. After serving under both Secretaries Clinton and John Kerry, she left government. She said she came to Washington after 9/11 again and wanted to serve – she left after more than a decade in public service. She worked at USAID and then went to the National Security Council and then the U.S. Department of State. When she left in 2014, she returned to her home state of Massachusetts.

Farah Pandith is a senior fellow with the Future of Diplomacy Project at the Belfer Center for Science and International Affairs at the Harvard Kennedy School. Before that she had been a Spring fellow at the Institute of Politics. Right after leaving government she began working with the London-based Institute for Strategic Dialogue from outside of government. She is currently the Head of Strategy for ISD. She is an adjunct senior fellow at the Council on Foreign Relations.

== Book ==
Farah Pandith is the author of How We Win: How Cutting-Edge Entrepreneurs, Political Visionaries, Enlightened Business Leaders and Social Media Mavens Can Defeat the Extremist Threat. In, How We Win, she explains how government, the private sector, and civil society can help Muslim youth solve their identity crisis and in turn build a safer, more stable world. She introduces a concept called open power, which she defines as the ability to solve critical human challenges through peer-to-peer exploration, collaboration and ownership. She has received a lot of praise for How We Win.

== Career ==
As the first-ever Special Representative to Muslim Communities, Farah Pandith was responsible for engaging with Muslims around the world both organizationally and individually. Reporting directly to the Secretary of State, Ms. Pandith traveled to nearly one hundred countries and launched youth-focused initiatives. In January 2013, she was awarded the Secretary's Distinguished Honor Award. Prior to her appointment as Special Representative, Farah Pandith was senior advisor to the assistant secretary of state for European and Eurasian Affairs at the U.S. Department of State.

From December 2004 to February 2007, Ms. Pandith served on the National Security Council staff as the director for Middle East Regional Initiatives. She re-entered government after the attacks on September 11, 2001, to serve as chief of staff of the Bureau for Asia and the Near East for the U.S. Agency for International Development (USAID). In 2004, she spent two months in Afghanistan developing a public outreach strategy. She also served at USAID from 1990 to 1993 on the administrator's staff and as the special assistant to the director of policy. From 1997 to 2003, Ms. Pandith was Vice President of International Business for ML Strategies, LLC in Boston, Massachusetts, and served as a Commissioner on Governor Paul A. Cellucci's bi-partisan Asian Advisory Commission.

Farah Pandith has also consulted for organizations in the public, private, and non-profit sectors and has served in leadership positions on several boards with a focus on international affairs, women's empowerment, education, and cultural diplomacy. She sits on several boards including on the Fletcher School of Law and Diplomacy's Board of Advisors. She was a member of Secretary Jeh Johnson's Homeland Security Advisory Council where she chaired its task force on countering violent extremism from 2015 to 2017. Their task force report in 2016 presented a 50 state CVE plan to protect the homeland. From 2017, she also served as a Commissioner and Strategic Advisor on the Center for Strategic and International Studies CVE Commission. Tony Blair and Leon Panetta were the chairs of the commission. The final report is called Turning Point.

In October 2022, Pandith joined the Council for Responsible Social Media project launched by Issue One to address the negative mental, civic, and public health impacts of social media in the United States co-chaired by former House Democratic Caucus Leader Dick Gephardt and former Massachusetts Lieutenant Governor Kerry Healey.

== Education ==
Farah Pandith received a master's degree from The Fletcher School of Law and Diplomacy at Tufts University, where she specialized in International Security Studies, Islamic Civilizations and Southwest Asia, and International Negotiation and Conflict Resolution. She received an A.B. in Government and Psychology from Smith College, where she was president of the student body. She was awarded an honorary Doctor of Humane Letters from Mount Saint Mary's University in 2017 and an honorary Doctor of Laws from Tufts University in 2018. Farah graduated from Milton Academy located in Milton, MA in 1986.

== Awards ==
Farah Pandith is the recipient of many awards, including the Smith College Medal and the National Campus Leadership Council's Presidential Legacy Award. She has also been the recipient of the European Academy of Sciences and Arts Ring of Tolerance, the Tufts University Alumni Distinguished Achievement Award, the University of Massachusetts Lowell Public Service Award, the NDTV Profit Award for Excellence in International Governance, and a RUMI Peace and Dialogue Award for Extraordinary Commitment to Public Service. Farah Pandith was named one of Boston Magazine’s top ‘Thinkers’ in 2014 and one of Washingtonian’s 100 Most Powerful Women in 2011.

== Media ==
Farah Pandith appears regularly in the print and television media. She wrote a piece for the Washington Post in 2017 on how to fix democracy, advocating for a “Marshall Plan” type of program called the "National Civic Plan." She has been featured on CBS News, NPR, PBS, MSNBC, Bloomberg, CNN, The Cipher Brief, The Boston Globe, New York Times, Washington Post, among others.

== Personal life ==
Farah Pandith was born in Srinagar, India, and was raised in the Commonwealth of Massachusetts. She divides her time between Washington, D.C.; London; and Cambridge, Massachusetts.
