= Ronald C. Wornick =

American food scientist, entrepreneur, and art collector (1932–2021)

Ronald C. Wornick (May 21, 1932 – July 31, 2021) was an American food scientist, entrepreneur and art collector. He was best known for founding The Wornick Company, which was selected by the U.S. Department of Defense in 1979 to mass-produce Meals, Ready to Eat or MREs, a next-generation version of individual combat meals or C-Rations that brought greater menu variety and improved food storage and preparation options to servicemen in the field.

== Early life ==
Wornick, the son of Russian immigrant Jews, grew up in Malden, Massachusetts, a suburb of Boston. While attending Malden's public schools, he took up the trumpet and formed a dance band at age 14. He moonlighted as a paid musician while attending Tufts University in Medford, Massachusetts.

Upon graduation from Tufts University in 1954 with a Bachelor of Science, Wornick enlisted in the United States Army and was later assigned to its 82nd Airborne Division Band where he played the trumpet until being transferred to the army's food laboratory in New York City. It was during this period he began experimenting with food technologies, including food lyophilization or freeze-drying. While in the army, Wornick married Anita Lev in 1955.

== Honorable discharge and graduate school ==
After being discharged from the army in 1957, Wornick entered graduate school at the Massachusetts Institute of Technology in Cambridge, studying under the food scientist Bernard E. Proctor. During this time he also worked part-time at the National Fisheries Institute (NFI) developing processes for testing the freshness of fish based on trimethylamine oxide levels. In 1959, midway through graduate school, Wornick took a temporary leave of absence from MIT in order to pursue a paid position as a library assistant at the research center of United Fruit Company in Norwood, Massachusetts. At the time, United Fruit Company (the predecessor to Chiquita) was struggling to contain the spread of a soil-born fungus destroying its banana farms in Latin America, known as Panama disease (Fusarium Wilt). Wornick, who helped come up with a treatment for Panama Disease, was promoted to scientist and later a division president in charge of food processing. MIT awarded him a graduate degree shortly thereafter.

== Corporate career ==
In 1970, United Fruit Company merged with AMK-John Morrell to become United Brands. Wornick, by then director of corporate development, resigned from the company, acquiring its multimillion-dollar a year freeze-dried food division, Right Away Foods Corporation in San Carlos, Texas, where he moved to oversee operations. Wornick then began the management of Right Away Foods which was ultimately purchased in 1972 by The Clorox Company, Wornick stayed on as part of its management team and served as a board member.

== Contribution to MREs ==
In 1976, he resigned and reacquired the firm, later changing its name to The Wornick Company. In 1979, it was selected by the U.S. military to commercialize and deliver its newest version of the individual combat field ration, Meals, Ready to Eat or MREs. Lighter and smaller than the old C-Rations, the MREs produced by the Wornick Company, weighed approximately 1.5 pounds and covered an area of .08 cubic feet. They revolutionized how and what servicemen ate in the field.

First put into service by the U.S. Space program, MREs featured specially designed meal pouches known as "retort packages". The pouches, made from multiple layers of flexible laminate, allowed for the sterile packaging of a wide variety of fully cooked, thermo stabilized (heat-treated) high caloric (1,300 on average) meals. They could be eaten cold, warmed by submersing in hot water, or through the use of a flameless ration heater, a meal component introduced by the military in 1992.

The Wornick Company eventually became a supplier of individual and group military field rations to the U.S. Department of Defense. Its MREs were not only used by the U.S. military but foreign combat forces as well as international humanitarian aid organizations.

Wornick retired in 1995, selling the multimillion-dollar food conglomerate through an ESOP to its employees. He remained on the board until 1999. In 2004, The Wornick Company was purchased by Veritas Capital Fund II LP for $155 million.

== Private life ==
Wornick and his wife were private collectors of contemporary (also known as conceptual) craft. Beginning in the mid-1980s, Wornick, a woodworker, began collecting pieces made from wood, ceramics, glass, fiber, and metal, creating a contemporary craft collection. The collection, which was bequeathed in part (250 pieces) to the Museum of Fine Art in Boston in 2007, has been on exhibit at the Museum of Fine Art in Boston, American Craft Museum in New York, and the Oakland Museum of California.

Wornick also was involved in the wine industry, growing Veder Hills estate and vineyards which became Hess Collection and the development of Seven Stones, a 45 acre premier estate, winery and vineyards in St. Helena, which produces 500 cases of premium cabernet wine that has garnered ratings as high as 99 points. It was sold to Hanwha in 2023 in the largest sale by Compass in Napa history.
