= Umberto Milletti =

- Born: Monza, Italy
- Education: Tufts University, University of California
- Known for: CEO and Founder InsideView

Umberto Milletti is the CEO and founder of InsideView, a San Francisco-based CRM intelligence company. The company is backed by Foundation Capital, Emergence Capital, Split Rock Partners and Rembrandt Venture Partners. It has raised a total of $46M.

Prior to founding InsideView, Milletti was an executive and co-founder of DigitalThink, an electronic learning (eLearning) enterprise services company that sought to address the entire range of a corporation's training and education needs. Previously, Milletti led product development at Knowledge Revolution, a developer of educational and engineering software acquired by MSC Software. He also held various management positions at Integrated Systems Inc., which was acquired by Wind River Systems in 2000.

Milletti is also an amateur auto racer.

Milletti holds a B.S., summa cum laude, in Electrical Engineering from Tufts University and an M.S. in Electrical Engineering and Computer Science from the University of California-Berkeley.
