= DigitalThink =

Enterprise solutions company (SaaS) model

DigitalThink, Inc. (acquired by Convergys)
- Industry: Software & Programming
- Founded: 1996
- Headquarters: San Francisco, California
- Products: eLearning Software

DigitalThink was an electronic learning (eLearning) company. Founded in 1996 by Umberto Milletti, Pete Goettner and Steve Zahm At one time it was termed a Business Solution Provider (BSP) but would likely be viewed in modern terms as a software-as-a-service (SaaS) model.

DigitalThink was one of the first eLearning companies to incorporate online mentors and tutors into their offering. A notable accomplishment of the company was to secure a deal with McDonald's corporation to provide McDonald's with a global, web-based training program.

== Acquisition by Convergys Corporation ==
The company was acquired in March 2004 by Convergys Corporation for $120 million, or approximately $2.40 per share.
