= Frank Lahey =

Physician who founded the Lahey Clinic in Boston

Frank Howard Lahey MD (June 1, 1880, Haverhill, Massachusetts – June 27, 1953, Boston, Massachusetts), was a physician who founded the Lahey Clinic in Boston in 1923. Lahey was nationally known in the U.S. medical profession as an administrator and teacher.

== Consultation with President Franklin D. Roosevelt ==
In March 1944, Lahey was called to the White House to see President Franklin D. Roosevelt. Lahey ultimately advised Roosevelt not to seek a fourth term, since Roosevelt was suffering with serious illnesses, possibly including cancer and advanced heart disease, expressing serious doubt that Roosevelt could survive another four years in office. Lahey later agreed to suppress his report due to national security issues during wartime.

Roosevelt died in April 1945, of what his attending physician said was a cerebral hemorrhage. Lahey's report on Roosevelt's illness was finally published many years after his death.

== Bibliography ==
- Harry S. Goldsmith MD, A Conspiracy of Silence: The Health and Death of Franklin D. Roosevelt (IUniverse, 2007) ISBN 0595399428
