= Jim McNitt =

American painter and photographer (born 1948)

James David McNitt (born 1948) is an American painter and photographer. He has worked as a news photographer for United Press International (1974), a freelance marine photojournalist (1975–1982), and as a contract photographer, writer and editor for Newsweek International Special Projects (1982–2002). Since 2002, McNitt has concentrated on digital printmaking and mixed-media paintings, especially images that advocate awareness of climate change and other environmental issues.

McNitt has contributed articles to Newsweek International, People and other periodicals and is the author of two books: “The Art of Computer Management,” and “The Home Video Sourcebook,”. He is also a member of the faculty at the Silvermine Guild Art Center in New Canaan, Connecticut, where he teaches digital imaging and printmaking.
