= Robert L. Coble =

American ceramic scientist

Robert Louis Coble (January 22, 1928 – August 27, 1992) was an American ceramic scientist, notable for his discovery of Coble creep, the effect that carries his name, and for his invention of Lucalox. Coble was a member of the National Academy of Engineering. The National Academy of Engineering said that Coble was "widely recognized for his contributions to the theory of sintering of materials and to ceramic processing". Coble received Humboldt Research Award in 1984. The American Ceramic Society established an award in Coble's name: Robert L. Coble Award for Young Scholars.

== Biography ==
Coble was born in Uniontown, Pennsylvania. He graduated from Bethany College (1950) and received his doctorate from the Massachusetts Institute of Technology (1955). After graduation from MIT, Coble worked as a researcher at the General Electric Research Laboratory. He Joined MIT faculty in 1960, and became a full professor at MIT in 1969. At MIT, his doctoral students included Nancy Dudney, who completed her doctorate in 1979.

Coble retired in 1988 and died by drowning in 1992. Coble drowned off the coast of the island of Maui in Hawaii on August 27, 1992.
