= Nancy Dudney =

American materials scientist

Nancy Johnson Dudney is a retired American materials scientist, formerly a corporate fellow at the Oak Ridge National Laboratory. She is known for her research on electric batteries and energy storage.

== Education and career ==
Dudney graduated from the College of William & Mary in 1975, with a bachelor's degree in chemistry. She earned a Ph.D. in ceramics in 1979 from the Massachusetts Institute of Technology, supervised by Robert L. Coble.

She joined the Oak Ridge National Laboratory in 1979 for postdoctoral research as a Wigner Fellow, and obtained a permanent staff researcher position there in 1981. She became a group leader in thin film ceramics in 1999, a senior research staff member in 2006, and a distinguished senior research staff member in 2010. She retired in 2021.

== Recognition ==
Dudney was named as a fellow of the Electrochemical Society in 2013. UT–Battelle named her as a distinguished inventor in 2014, and Oak Ridge named her as a corporate fellow in 2015. She was elected to the National Academy of Engineering in 2022, "for contributions to the development of high-performance solid-state rechargeable batteries".
