= Mary Crutchfield Wright Thompson =

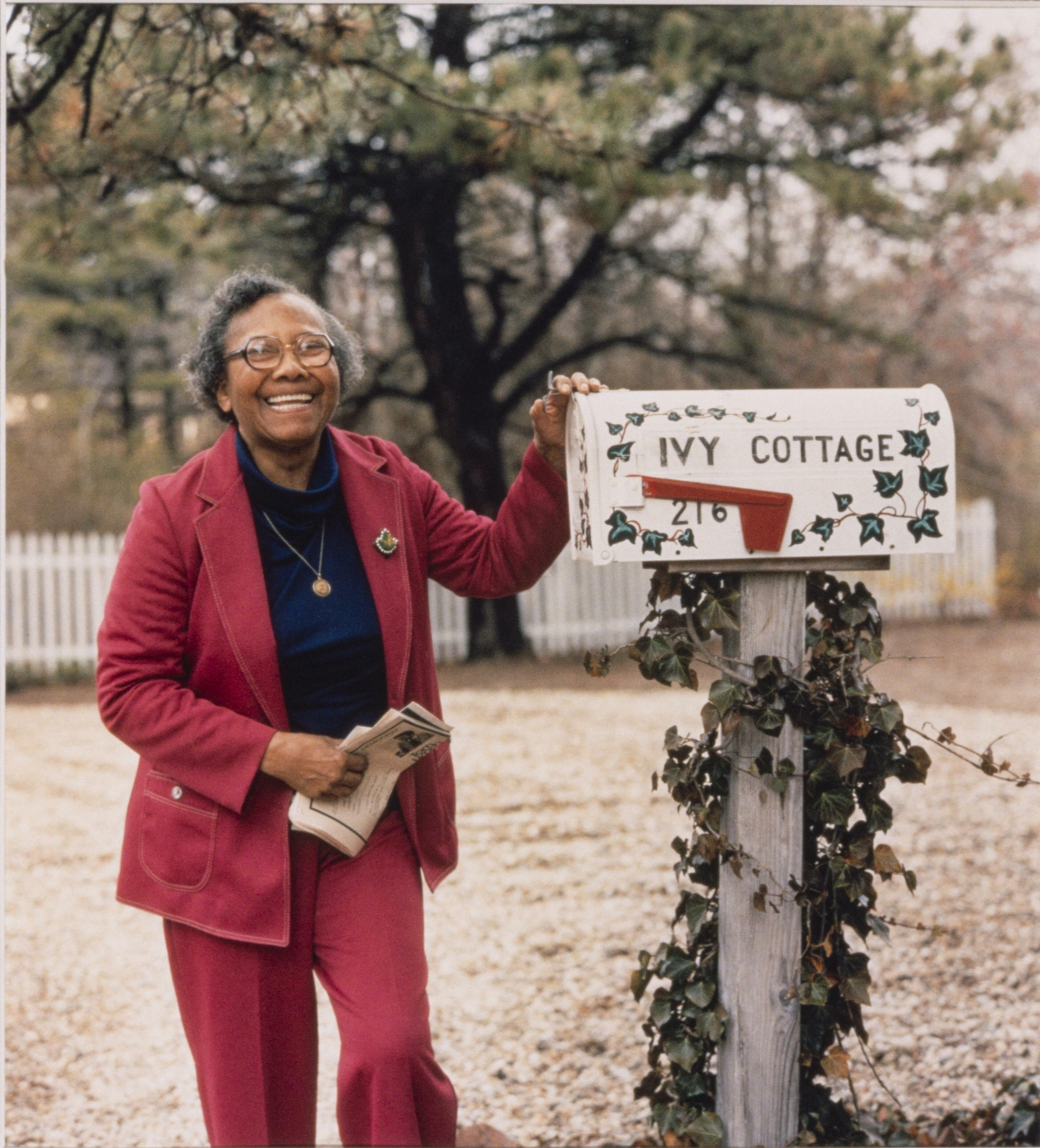
- Born: 1902
- Died: 1985 (aged 82–83)
- Occupation: Dentist

Mary Crutchfield Wright Thompson (1902 - 1985) was one of the first Black women to graduate from Tufts University Dental School, and the first to practice dentistry in the Boston area.

Thompson was born in 1902 in North Carolina and grew up in Cambridge, Massachusetts. She was raised as the only child of William and Lydia Crutchfield. She graduated from Cambridge High and Latin in 1925 and started at Tufts Dental in the same year. She graduated from Tufts in 1930.

Thompson was the only woman to pass the Massachusetts Civil Service examination for dentists in the state institutions in 1932. She worked as the Cambridge Public Schools dentist after the male-only requirement for the accreditation exam was removed.

Thompson founded the Natick Fair Housing Practices Committee, a committee for fighting against housing discrimination in the 1950s. She was recognized for her work by the NAACP in 1973.

In 2023, she was recognized as one of "Boston’s most admired, beloved, and successful Black Women leaders" by the Black Women Lead project.
