= Dancing with the Stars (Greek TV series) =

- Created by: Fenia Vardanis; Richard Hopkins
- Based on: Strictly Come Dancing
- Developed by: BBC
- Presented by: Zeta Makripoulia; Doukissa Nomikou; Evangelia Aravani; Vicky Kaya; Backstage; Eleni Karpontini; Mary Sinatsaki; Argiris Aggelou; Ntoretta Papadimitriou; Kostas Martakis; Savvas Poumpouras; Lambros Fisfis
- Judges: Alexis Kostalas; Giannis Latsios; Galena Velikova; Katia Dandoulaki; Lakis Gavalas; Errica Prezerakou; Fokas Evagelinos; Eleonora Meleti; Giorgos Liagas; Jason Roditis; Elena Lizardou; Marina Lampropoulou; Stefanos Dimoulas
- Opening theme: "It's personal" by The Radio Dept
- Country of origin: Greece
- Original language: Greek
- No. of seasons: 7
- No. of episodes: 91

Production
- Production locations: Athens, Greece
- Running time: approx. 180 to 200 minutes per episode (including commercials)
- Production company: ENA Productions (1–6)

Original release
- Network: ANT1
- Release: 28 March 2010 – 1 February 2015
- Release: 26 January – 4 May 2018
- Network: Star Channel
- Release: 17 October 2021 – 28 January 2022

Dancing with the Stars is a Greek dance competition television series that premiered on March 28, 2010, on ANT1 and filmed live in Athens. The show aired until February 1, 2015, on ANT1. On January 26, 2018 ANT1 premiered the sixth season and aired until May 4, 2018. The show returned from Star Channel. The show is based on the British reality TV competition Strictly Come Dancing and is part of the Dancing with the Stars franchise. The theme song is "It's personal" performed by Swedish indie pop band The Radio Dept.

The format of the show consists of a celebrity paired with a professional dancer. Each couple performs predetermined dances and competes against the others for judges' points and audience votes. The couple receiving the lowest combined total of judges' points and audience votes is eliminated each week until only the champion dance pair remains.

== Cast ==
=== Hosts ===
Logo used for seasons 1–6.

Since its premiere in 2010, the show was hosted by Zeta Makripoulia. In the fourth season Makripoulia was replaced by Doukissa Nomikou. The sixth season was hosted by Evangelia Aravani. There was also a different co-host in each season for the backstage room, also known as Green Room. The co-hosts included Eleni Karpontini (first season) and Mary Sinatsaki (second season). Argiris Aggelou, the winner of the second season, co-hosted the third season, Doretta Papadimitriou, the winner of the third season, co-hosted the fourth season and Kostas Martakis, the runner-up of the second season, co-hosted the fifth season. Savvas Poumpouras co-hosted the sixth season.

On April 15, 2021 it was announced that model Vicky Kaya, will be hosting the seventh season of the show, which began airing on Star Channel in the television season 2021–2022. Lambros Fisfis was the co-host for the backstage room.

Presenter	Season						
Presenter	1	2	3	4	5	6	7
Zeta Makripoulia	Main	Main	Main				
Doukissa Nomikou				Main	Main		
Evangelia Aravani				Contestant		Main	
Vicky Kaya							Main

Co-host	Season						
Co-host	1	2	3	4	5	6	7
Eleni Karpontini	Main						
Mary Sinatsaki		Main		Contestant			
Argiris Aggelou		Contestant	Main				
Ntoretta Papadimitriou			Contestant	Main			
Kostas Martakis		Contestant			Main		
Savvas Poumpouras	Contestant					Main	
Lambros Fisfis							Main

=== Judges ===
Giannis Latsios, Fokas Evaggelinos, Galena Velikova-Chaina and Alexis Kostalas were the judges of the first season. In the second season, Errica Prezerakou, the winner of the first season, replaced Velikova-Chaina. In the third season, Prezerakou was replaced by Katia Dandoulaki and Velikova-Chaina returned.

In the fourth season, all the judges from season 3 returned except for Evaggelinos, while Giorgos Liagkas, Eugenia Manolidou and Themos Anastasiadis were guest judges for the 4th, 8th and 9th week respectively. In the fifth season all the judges from season 4 returned. Lakis Gavalas is the fifth judge in fifth season.

In the sixth season Kostalas and Velikova returned as judges, while Giorgos Liagas and, former contestant, Eleonora Meleti joined the judging panel. Throughout the season, various guest judges appeared as the fifth judge in the judging panel for one episode.

The four new judges in the seventh season, that aired on Star Channel, were Stefanos Dimoulas, Marina Lampropoulou, Elena Lizardou and Jason Roditis.

Judge	Season						
Judge	1	2	3	4	5	6	7
Alexis Kostalas	Main	Main	Main	Main	Main	Main	
Giannis Latsios	Main	Main	Main	Main	Main		
Fokas Evagelinos	Main	Main	Main				
Galena Velikova	Main		Main	Main	Main	Main	
Errika Prezerakou	Contestant	Main					
Katia Dandoulaki			Main	Main	Main		
Lakis Gavalas				Contestant	Main		
Giorgos Liagkas				Guest		Main	
Eleonora Meleti		Contestant				Main	
Stefanos Dimoulas							Main
Marina Lampropoulou							Main
Elena Lizardou							Main
Jason Roditis							Main
Eugenia Manolidou	Contestant			Guest			
Themos Anastasiadis				Guest			
Natalia Germanou						Guest	
Vicky Hadjivassiliou						Guest	
Maria Solomou						Guest	
Tatiana Stefanidou						Guest	
Katerina Gagaki						Guest	
Nadia Boule		Contestant				Guest	
Ntoretta Papadimitriou			Contestant			Guest	
Isaias Matiamba				Contestant		Guest	
Charis Christopoulos						Guest	
Nikos Koklonis							Guest

=== Couples ===
A total of 100 celebrities have appeared during the 7 seasons of the series. Twelve celebrities participated in the first season, 14 in the second, third, fourth and fifth season and 16 in the sixth, seventh season. Also, a total of 49 professional partners have appeared alongside celebrities, some for only one season.

==== Professional partners ====
Bold font indicates that the dancer is a participant in the present season.

Color key:

Winner
Runner-up
3rd place

Professional dancer	Seasons						
Professional dancer	1	2	3	4	5	6	7
Alexander Bachariev							Georgia Georgiou
Alexandros Papadopoulos	Patritsia Peristeri					Christina Lampiri	
Alexandros Papadopoulos	Patritsia Peristeri					Maggie Charalampidou	
Anastasia Draka			Nikos Anadiotis	Lakis Gavalas	Theocharis Ioannidis		
Anastasis Kanaridis						Maria Kalavria	
Anna Polyzou	Michalis Zambidis	Nasos Galakteros	Kostas Krommidas	Michalis Mouroutsos		Alberto Eskenazi	
Argyris Argyropoulos							Christina Vrachali
Athina Palaiologou							Tasos Palatzidis
Claudia-Anna Stoyia		Tryfonas Samaras	Elias Vrettos	Alex Kavdas	Thanos Petrelis	Michalis Seitis	
Christina Novakivska							Lefteris Mitsopoulos
Danai Avloniti							Dimitris Kokonidis
Dimitris Fokas			Vasia Trifylli				
Dimitris Kranias	Fotini Pipili	Niki Xanthou					
Dionisis Klampanis					Niki Kartsona		
Dionisis Valmis			Marianta Pieridi	Konstantina			
Efi Chormova							Ioannis Drymonakos
Efi Giannaraki	Stamatis Gardelis						
Elias Boutsis	Vicky Koulianou	Aggeliki Iliadi	Elena Papavasileiou	Katerina Stikoudi		Maria Korinthiou	
Elias Ladas	Eugenia Manolidou	Eleonora Meleti			Elisavet Spanou	Pinelopi Anastasopoulou	
Elina Pini						Antonis Vlontakis	
Elisavet Madani							Edward Stergiou
Emily Matthaiakaki	Savvas Poumpouras	Argiris Aggelou	Giorgos Tsalikis				
Eutuxia Marketaki			Giannis Aivazis				
Evi Semprou					Thanasis Viskadourakis		
Fotini Papastavrou		Giorgos Gerolimatos		Thanos Kallioras	Triantafyllos	Dionisis Alertas	
Gaetano Parisi					Christina Aloupi		
Gerasimos Moshopoulos							Reggina Makedou
Giannis Tserkinis			Laura Narjes				
Giorgos Ketseridis				Eleni Chatzidou		Vicky Kavoura	
Giorgos Ketseridis				Eleni Chatzidou		Olga Piliaki	
Irene Linardou							Dominic Stars
Konstantinos Papazoglou					Eirini Papadopoulou		
Maria Adimisari	Dimitris Vlachos	Kostas Martakis	Spyros Soulis	Isaias Matiamba	Christos Spanos		
Maria Kamenidi							Stavros Varthalitis
Maria Tsitou						Kostas Tsouros	
Marili Kourtesi							Panos Giannakopoulos
Maxim Stadnik							Vasiliki Millousi
Nikoletta Mauridi				Sakis Arseniou		Vangelis Kakouriotis	
Panagiotis Grammatikos	Hrysopiyi Devetzi						
Panos Xylas		Maria Tsouri					
Paulos Manogiannakis			Ntoretta Papadimitriou	Klelia Pantazi	Maria Iliaki	Evridiki Valavani	
Richard Szilagyi	Matthildi Maggira				Morfoula Ntona	Annie Pantazi	
Spyros Pavlidis							Marianna Georgadi
Tasos Roussos						Myriella Kourenti	
Thanos Pisanidis		Nadia Boule					
Thodoris Panagakos	Errika Prezerakou	Marietta Chrousala	Vana Mparmpa	Gogo Mastrokosta	Nikoletta Karra		
Tilemaxos Fatsis							Victoria Hislop
Tzeni Nikolentzou	Kostas Sommer	Giorgos Chraniotis			Fanis Lampropoulos	Anthimos Ananiadis	
Vaggelis Holevas		Natassa Kalogridi	Kelly Kellekidou	Chrispa			
Vladimir Morotsko				Evagelia Aravani	Thalia Prokopiou	Dorothea Merkouri	Elena Tsagrinou
Yuri Dimitrov		Natalia Dragoumi	Nikoleta Ralli	Mary Synatsaki			Bessy Argyraki

=== List of dance ===
Dance	Seasons performed
Argentine tango	2-6
Bachata	4-6
Bollywood	5-
Cha-cha-cha	1-6
Christmas Rock 'n Roll Marathon	4
Christmas Swing Marathon	5
Contemporary	5-6
Dance Boogie Marathon	3
Dance Fusion	4
Disco	3, 5-6
European tango	5-6
Foxtrot	1-6
Freestyle	1-6
HipHop	6
Instant Cha-cha-cha	3
Jive	1-6
Lambada	5
Mambo	1-6
Merengue	5
Paso Doble	1-6
Pole dance	6
Quickstep	1-6
Rock 'n Roll	1-2
Rock 'n Roll Marathon	2
Rumba	1-6
Salsa	4-6
Solo Dance	4, 6
Samba	1-6
Tango	1-6
Team Dances	2, 4, 6
Trio Challenge	3-6
Viennese Waltz	1-6
Waltz	1-2, 4-6

== Highest-scoring celebrities ==
=== Number of perfect scores ===
# of 40/50s	Season	Place	Celebrity	Professional partner
8	5	Champion	Morfoula Ntona	Richard Szilagyi
7				
6				
5	1; 3	2nd Champion	Matthildi Maggira; Ntoretta Papadimitriou	Richard Szilagyi; Paulos Manogiannakis
4	4; 4; 6	Champion; 2nd 3rd	Isaias Matiamba; Katerina Stikoudi; Olga Piliaki	Maria Antimisari; Elias Boutsis; Giorgos Ketseridis
3	1; 2; 5; 6	Champion; Champion; 2nd 4th	Errika Prezerakou; Argiris Aggelou; Eirini Papadopoulou; Myriella Kourenti	Thodoris Panagakos; Emily Matthaiakaki; Konstantinos Papazoglou; Tasos Roussos
2	1; 3; 4; 5; 6; 6	3rd 2nd 3rd 3rd Champion; 2nd	Eugenia Manolidou; Elias Vrettos; Klelia Pantazi; Nikoleta Karra; Vangelis Kakouriotis; Evridiki Valavani	Elias Ladas; Claudia-Anna Stoyia; Paulos Manogiannakis; Thodoris Panagakos; Nikoletta Mavridi; Paulos Manogiannakis
1	2; 2; 2; 6	6th 2nd 3rd 5th	Eleonora Meleti; Kostas Martakis; Aggeliki Iliadi; Kostas Tsouros	Elias Ladas; Maria Antimisari; Elias Boutsis; Maria Tsitou

== Series overview ==
Season	No. of stars	No. of weeks	Originally aired			Celebrity honor places		
Season	No. of stars	No. of weeks	First aired	Last aired	Network	Winner	Second place	Third place
1	12	13	March 28, 2010	June 20, 2010	ANT1	Errika Prezerakou & Thodoris Panagakos	Matthildi Maggira & Richard Szilagyi	Eugenia Manolidou & Elias Ladas
2	14	13	March 20, 2011	June 10, 2011	ANT1	Argiris Aggelou & Emily Matthaiakaki	Kostas Martakis & Maria Adimisari	Aggeliki Iliadi & Elias Boutsis
3	14	14	November 18, 2012	February 17, 2013	ANT1	Ntoretta Papadimitriou & Pavlos Manogiannakis	Elias Vrettos & Claudia-Anna Stoyia	Laura Narjes & Giannis Tserkinis
4	14	15	October 20, 2013	February 2, 2014	ANT1	Isaias Matiamba & Maria Adimisari	Katerina Stikoudi & Elias Boutsis	Klelia Pantazi & Paulos Manogiannakis
5	14	14	October 26, 2014	February 1, 2015	ANT1	Morfoula Ntona & Richard Szilagyi	Eirini Papadopoulou & Konstantinos Papazoglou	Nikoleta Karra & Thodoris Panagakos
6	18	14	January 26, 2018	May 4, 2018	ANT1	Vangelis Kakouriotis & Nikoletta Mavridi	Evridiki Valavani & Pavlos Manogiannakis	Olga Piliaki & Giorgos Ketseridis
7	16	15	October 17, 2021	January 28, 2022	Star Channel	Georgia Georgiou & Alexander Bachariev	Stavros Varthalitis & Maria Kamenidi	Dominic Stars & Irini Linardou
