= Nikos Anadiotis =

Greek politician

Nikos Anadiotis MEP
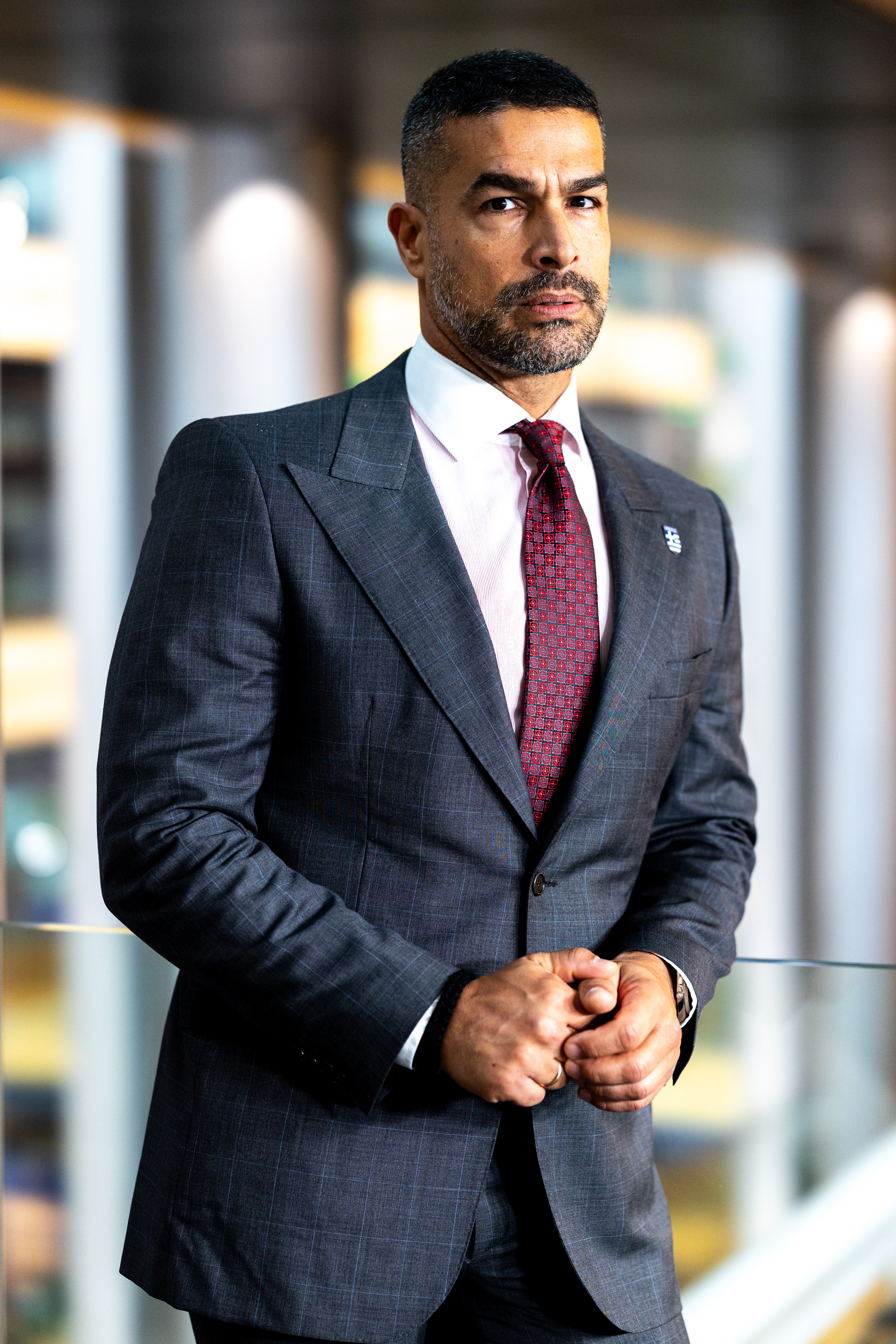

Member of the European Parliament for Greece
- Incumbent
- Assumed office 16 July 2024

Personal details
- Born: 10 February 1983 (age 43) Athens, Greece
- Party: Niki
- Education: National and Kapodistrian University of Athens
- Occupation: Actor • Model • Politician

Nikos Anadiotis (Greek: Νίκος Αναδιώτης, born 1983) is a Greek politician for the Niki party as well as an actor and model. He is member of the European Parliament.

== Biography ==
Anadiotis was born in Athen, Greece and grew up in Aigio. He studied Physical Education and Sports Science at the National and Kapodistrian University of Athens, and he studied Physical Therapy at the Technological Educational Institute of Western Greece in Patras. He completed his military service in the Hellenic Navy.

Anadiotis is married and has two children.

== Filmography ==
=== Television ===
Year	Title	Role(s)	Notes	Ref.
2011–2013	The Kings	Minas Kapatos	Main role, 99 episodes	
2012	My Mother's Sin	Nikolas	Episode No. 14 (unaired)	
2012–2013	Dancing with the Stars	Himself (contestant)	Season 3; 3rd runner-up	
2013	Emma's Home	athlete	1 episode	
2014	Happy Day	Himeself (co-host)	Daytime talk show; season 1	
2014–2015	Justification	Asim Atzram	Main role, 100 episodes	
2014–2015	Home sweet home	Himself (co-host)	Weekend talk show; season 1	
2016	Cretan Annual Beauty Pageant	Himself (host)	TV special	
2016–2017	The Five Keys	Jimmys	Main role, 185 episodes	
2017	Nomads	Himself (contestant)	Season 1; 3rd runner-up	
2018	Summer Together at 10	Himself (host)	Daytime talk show	
2020	If I were rich	Makis Zavalos	50 episodes	
2021	8 Words	Pavlos Grigoriou	40 episodes	
2023	I'm a Celebrity...Get Me Out of Here!	Himself (contestant)	Season 1; 3rd runner-up	

=== Film ===
Year	Title	Role	Notes	Ref.
2013	Acalyptus	man at gym	Film debut	
