= Concierge Unique =

Concierge Unique is a private concierge company based in Mykonos, Greece, founded by Apostolos (Tolis) Voutsas around 1999.

== History ==
According to ProtoThema, Voutsas began working as a concierge in Mykonos in the summer of 1999, taking on members of the Gaddafi family as his first clients, and later founded Concierge Unique. In 2016 the newspaper reported that the company arranged the four-day Mykonos visit of Leonardo DiCaprio, including his villa in Tourlos and his table at a concert by Antonis Remos featuring the Gipsy Kings at Nammos. The same report stated that the company had previously handled visits by U2, The Rolling Stones, Bon Jovi, and Lionel Richie. The DiCaprio visit itself was reported in English by Tornos News. The 2024 ProtoThema feature was syndicated by the Cypriot outlet tothemaonline and republished by the Greek news site Europost and the Mykonos local outlet Mykonos Voice.

== Operations ==
The company arranges villa accommodation, yacht and helicopter charters, and restaurant and club reservations for clients visiting Greece.
