= Katerina Stikoudi =

Greek singer, model and actress

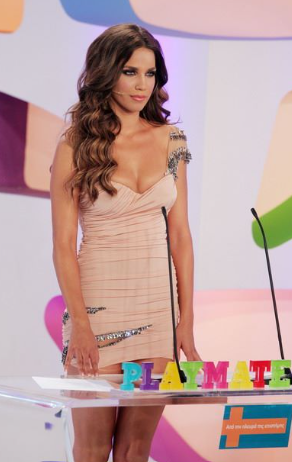
- Born: Aikaterini Stikoudi; 16 April 1985 (age 41); Thessaloniki, Greece
- Education: Technological Educational Institute of Thessaly
- Occupations: Singer; actress; host; model; businesswoman; champion swimmer
- Years active: 2005–present
- Spouse: Vangelis Serifis (m. 2018)

Aikaterini "Katerina" Stikoudi (Greek: Αικατερίνη "Κατερίνα" Στικούδη; born 16 April 1985) is a Greek singer, actress, TV host, model, businesswoman, former champion swimmer and beauty pageant titleholder. After first gaining fame in 2001 by finishing fifth in the national swimming championship as PAOK swimming athlete she pursued a career in modeling, television, cinema and theatre. In 2005 she won the title of Miss Hellas 2005, on National Annual Beauty Pageant of Greece, followed by her participation on Miss World 2005 representing Greece.

On the following year, Stikoudi followed a career as a hostess and actress hosting the talk shows La Sousourela (2005), Proinos Kafes (2006), Mega Star from 2008 to 2011, Guinness World Record Show (2009), My Style Rocks (2020) and Just the 2 Of Us (2021). She also appeared in television series as Erotas (2005), Daddy's Girls (2007), If I were rich (2019) and movies as Soula Ela Xana (2009), The treasure (2017), We did it all together! (2018), The Black Bachelor 4 (2021).

In 2009, Stikoudi cooperated with dj-LAVA, as a singer, in his single Tora. After then she started her solo career as a pop and rap singer. In 2011 she released her first music album I Mousiki mou (My Music). The next ten years she released four more albums I yefsi tis zois mou (2013), Cliche (2015), Soundtrack (2018) and Grande (2021).

== Early life ==
Aikaterini Stikoudi was born on 16 April 1985, in Thessaloniki, to Nikos Stikoudis, a greengrocer, and Dina Stikoudi (née Drapsa), an elementary school teacher. She has an older brother, named Telemachos.

From the early age of 8 she started her swimming career when her parents gave her the opportunity to register in PAOK swimming academy. In her adolescence, she signed with PAOK Swimming Team as a professional athlete. In 2001, at the age of 16, she finished fifth at the national championship.

== Career ==
=== Modeling Career, Beauty Pageants, Hosting and Acting Debut (2002-2008) ===
At the age of 17, Stikoudi started her modeling career in her hometown, Thessaloniki, signed with her first model agency having some photoshoots and model television appearances alongside her final school years. In 2003, after graduating from school, she entered in college. This year she moved to Larissa where she started studying Medical Laboratories and Dentistry on Technological Educational Institute of Thessaly. Alongside her college life as a helping doctor she started studying Arts and Theatre on Art Theatre of Christos Dimitriadis also in Larissa. After she completed three semesters on both of her studies she quitted to take part on National Beauty Pageant of Greece.

In early 2005, Stikoudi decided to sign up with Nation Annual Beauty Pageant of Greece, the most important and popular Beauty Contest on the country, holding by ANT1 Television Network. On April 18, after she passed the first steps of the competition, she took part on the semi-finals night. The next day she was on the Finals of the show where, at the end of the night, completed as the runner-up of the year with the title of Miss Hellas 2005. The following days she moved to Athens and signed with model agency Cristi's Models, having her first covers on Telerama, OK! Greece and others. On December 10 she represented Greece at the Miss World 2005 televised by E! NBC in Sanya, China, where she finished in top 20 countries. By the end of the year Stikoudi made her acting television debut on ANT1 Daytime soap opera Erotas, where she portrayed Violetta from 2005 to 2006. Moreover she signed with STAR Channel for the upcoming morning television talk show La Sousourela as the hostess of the show next to the journalist Themis Mallis.

She hosted the show until July 2006 when she signed with ANT1 for entering the morning television show Proinos Kafes. There she was the hostess of beauty and fashion column for two seasons, taking also part on the whole of the show next to the hostess Eleonora Meleti. In 2006, she also was the hostess of Model of the Year Beauty Contest and Peloponnesian Beauty Pageant in Greece. In 2007 she entered the cast of comedy series Daddy's Girls as Celia Roda and she also hosted the Peloponnesian Beauty Pageant for an other year. In 2008 she posed almost naked for the Greek men's magazine Nitro, for the cover of August, and she also made a guest appearance on the telenovela Lola portraying herself.

=== Mega Star, Television Hits, Singing Career and First Albums (2008-2011) ===
In August 2008, Stikoudi signed with biggest Greek television network Mega Channel, known as MEGA, as the new host of the most long-running talk show in Greek television Mega Star. On October 11, she made her first appearance on the show on the premiere of the 20th season. There she was presenting all the news about the music industry in Greece and worldwide and hosting singers and celebrities of the country, every Saturday afternoon. Her successful presence on the show made her continue hosting the show till May 2011, when Mega Channel decided to cancel the show after 22 years because of economic reasons.

Alongside the hosting of Mega Star, in 2009 she made a guest appearance on the family comedy hit My Beloved Neighbours and also made her film debut with an uncredited role in romance Soula Ela Xana. In the same period DJ Lava proposed her to sing together his new rap-influenced song Tora (Now). After she accepting the proposal, the sing became a big hit in Greece, being at the top of the charts for weeks. On June 24, 2009 she and DJ Lava won the award of "The Sexiest Video Clip of the Year", for their song Tora (Now), on MAD Video Music Awards. In August, she moved in Milan for a month to host the Greek version of talent show Guinness World Record Show, with the Greek top model Kostas Fragkolias, for MEGA. From 2009 to 2010, apart from the Guinness World Record Show and Mega Star, she appeared on four episodes of the comedy hit I Polykatoikia portraying herself. In 2010 she decided to start her singing career, apart from hosting and acting, signing with Cobalt Music, a Universal Music Group company in Greece. Her first cooperation as singer was with the rap boy band NEBMA on the hit Emmoνι (Οbsession) which was one of the biggest hits in Greece for 2010. Moreover she appeared as a guest on tv series M+M and Talk Dirty to me, she made a singing appearance on National Annual Beauty Pageant of Greece 2010 and she was a judge on Playmate of the Year Beauty Contest of Greece. From July to September 2010 she made her first singing summer tour across the country, named "NEBMA feat. Katerina Stikoudi Summer Tour".

From 2010 to 2011 she took part on the first season of celebrity singing talent show Just the 2 Of Us, as a celebrity contestant, next to the singer Nikos Mihas. In early 2011 she appeared on the successful MEGA Daytime soap opera The life of the other woman, for four episodes. On the same year she was placed 8th on the list of the sexiest woman celebrities worldwide for a survey of American's men magazines. On June 8 she was the host of the 15th Greek annual beauty pageant Playmate of the Year, organized by Playboy Greece and STAR Channel. On June 14, she made a duet performance with Mohombi on MAD Video Music Awards with the new version of the song Coconut Tree gaining the media attention in Greece. In the same period, after the cancellation of Mega Star, she decided to pause her hosting career for some years in order to focus on the release of the first music album. I Mousiki Mou (My Music), the name of her first album, released on winter of 2011 by Universal Music Group Greece including songs as Tora (Now), Emmoni (Obsessation), 6 ekatommyria (6 million ways) and I Mousiki Mou (My Music).

=== First professional singing steps, Cinema and Your Face Sounds Familiar (2012-2020) ===
Her first stage shows performance was in early 2012 was next to Nikos Oikonomopoulos and Elli Kokkinou on Thea Music Hall, Athens. In the same year she made a performance on MadWalk - The Fashion Music Project with the Greek boy bands Kokkina Chalia and NEBMA. On June she performed for a second time on MAD Video Music Awards with Nikos Ganos on the song Break me in the dark. Moreover she released, with Universal Music Group, her video-clips for her songs "Scenario", "Mi", "Ap'tin arhi (From the beginning)", "OK" and "San na min yparcho". She also continued her cooperation with Nikos Oikonomopoulos, and also Stamatis Gonidis, on Fever Music Hall, Athens from September 2012 to January 2013. She cooperated with the band Melisses in early 2013. This period released her new pop song "Psila Takounia (High Heels)", which became a big hit on radio and charts of the country. Followed the trap song "Milia Makria (Miles Away)" with the Cypriot singer Ablaze and the ballad "Me ena sou fili (With only one kiss)". On October 20, 2013 she entered on the fourth season of the show Dancing with the Stars. On February 2, 2014 she completed the show as a runner-up.

In 2014, she released her second music album named "I Gefsi tis Zois mou (The Flavor of my Life)". The album has basically romance influences and ballads as "S' ena oneiro (In a dream)", "I Gefsi tis Zois mou (The Flavor of my Life)" and "Tatouaz (Tattoo)". On June 23, 2014 she gained media attention for her sexy performance on MAD Video Music Awards next to the rapper BO and Nikiphoros. She also performed on music halls Vox and Astra Live with the artists Panos Kallidis, Christos Holidis, Chrispa and Ilias Vrettos. In late 2014 she made a guest appearance on the successful family comedy series Your Family as herself. In 2015, she released her third music album with the title "Cliché" contained pop songs. On April she performed on MadWalk - The Fashion Music Project with a Greek version of Nicki Minaj's and David Guetta hit "Hey Mama". On this period she was continuing her music tour through the country for almost nine months. From 2015 to 2016 she performed with Stamatis Gonidis and Giorgos Tsalikis to the Fix Live Music Hall in Thessaloniki for one season. In May 2016 she was photographed with the brothers Giannis Antetokounmpo and Thanasis Antetokounmpo, after their huge success on NBA, for the cover of lifestyle magazine Down Town Magazine. This issue of the magazine was one of the most successful of the year. On summer of 2016 she appeared for fourth time on MAD Video Music Awards performed with Konstantinos Koufos on the hit "I Pio Oraia stin Ellada (The most beautiful woman in Greece)". In 2017 she started working more actively on her next music album Soundtrack. She was also part of the cast of the comedy The Treasure, directed by Stratos Markidis, which was the remake of the classic Greek 50's comedy Dead Man's Treasure where she portrayed Sharon Chaido Manolakou. In 2018 she had the lead in the comedy We did it all together! as Margarita. In the same year the release of her new video music song "Enthade Koite (She rested in peace there)", in which Stikoudi was presenting her funeral, concentrate negative reviews and millions of views. Followed her next song Botox, in which she appeared foul of botox and plastic surgeries after hours of make-up and special effects work, she also garnered negative reviews. Followed her song 16 April in which her mother, Dina Stikoudi, was narrating her first hours in life after birth. On June 27, 2018 she performed with the pop artist Claydee on MAD Video Music Awards with his song Dame Dame. On December 11, 2018 she appeared on the late night talk show After Midnight with Eleonora Meleti talked about the impact of her last music songs and video clips. She revealed that all this was part of a concept for her fourth album Soundtrack in which she presents twelve new songs which were twelve different eras of a woman's life, and her own life, from the day her mother gave birth to her till the day of her funeral. The other songs ten songs was about the power and strength of her making her career with the song "Ap'tin archi (For zero point) or "Botox" was about the middle-age crisis a woman lives and the thinking of changing something up to her face and body with plastic surgeries.

In 2019 she became part of the cast of the celebrity talent show Your Face Sounds Familiar, on its fifth season. There she embodied various artists as Paola, Dimitra Galani, Cher, Vanilla Ice, Maria Farantouri, Nicki Minaj, Alice Cooper, Conchita Wurst and others. She was the weekly winner for three, to twelve, weeks and on the finals she was the runner-up of the show havings very positive reviews for her shows from the greek media. In March she finally presented her fourth music album Soundtrack. Followed her guest appearance on the popular comedy series Throw the fryer away next to Giannis Bezos as Kirki. On June 18, she performed for EuroPride 2019, being one the ambassadors of the annual show from now on, in Vienna. In August she signed with ANT1 for the lead role on the prime time telenovela If I were rich portraying Froso Vrouva, from September 2019 to May 2020. In October she signed with Minos EMI, for the continuing of her singing career. In November she returned on stage performances corporating with Vasilis Karras, Yannis Ploutarchos and Elli Kokkinou on Iera Odos, for 4 months. In December, she made her theater debut on the musical Annie for limited shows. Moreover at the same period she signed with Skai TV and Acun Medya for her television hosting comeback after nine years. In January 2020, she started hosting the daytime fashion reality show My Style Rocks. Her presence on the show continued until December, for two season of the show. In October she hosted the annual Madame Figaro Beauty Awards of Cyprus. In December she released her new Christmas song titled Ta Christougenna Mou Esy (My Christmas is You).

=== Her comeback on tv, YFSF: All Star, Greek-trap influences and EuroPrides (2021-today) ===
In 2021 she was again in the cast of Your Face Sounds Familiar in its All Star version, as one of the most successful contestants on the show's history. There she embodied artists as Shakira, Dimitra Papiou, James Blunt, Dimitra Galani, Billy Idol, Hadise and others being the weekly winner for one, to ten, weeks. On the finals she had the 7th place to 9 all star contestants. In early 2021 she also released her new singles, All Grande, Grande, Revenge, Rio, influenced by the popular greek-trap music and corporating with the artists DJ Stephan, Lil Pop, Kings, KG, Dinamiss.

In September 2021 she signed with BarkingWell Media and Alpha TV to be the new duet hostess of Nikos Koklonis in the upcoming season of Just the 2 Of Us, coming back to the show eleven years after her participation as celebrity contestant. Her first appearance on the show was on September 25 until today, in the seventh season. On October 15, three days before the birth of her first child, she released her fifth album Grande mainly consisted of her trap songs and balads. Before the end of the year she was part of the cast of the popular, fourth part of comedy movie-series, The Black Bachelor 4 portraying Eda one nymphomaniac woman living on an isolated tower. On June 10, 2022 she appeared as guest judge on the tenth episode of The Masked Singer. On June 22, she appeared after a long time on MAD Video Music Awards collaborating with Vegas, KG and Greg on the songs Yalla & Tous Ponaei. From July to September she was appearing with Stamatis Gonidis and Christos Menidiatis on Stage by Frangelico. On June 25, 2022 she had the lead performance on EuroPride 2022 held in front of the White Tower of Thessaloniki. In September she also performed in EuroPride 2022 in Belgrade. In October she returned on the theatre, performing in the musical The Full Monty on Theatre Vembo as Laura. In March 2023 she has the lead on the new comedy of Stratos Markidis The groom is shaved in the end.

== Filmography ==
=== Television ===
| Year | Title | Role(s) | Notes |
|---|---|---|---|
| 2005 | National Annual Beauty Pageant of Greece | Herself (contestant) | Miss Hellas '05 |
| 2005 | Miss World 2005 | Herself (contestant) | E! TV special |
| 2005-2006 | La Sousourela | Herself (host) | Daytime talk show on STAR; season 1 |
| 2005-2006 | Erotas | Violetta | Recurring role, 50 episodes |
| 2006 | Model of the Year Beauty Contest | Herself (host) | TV special |
| 2006 | Cretan Annual Beauty Pageant | Herself (judge) | TV special |
| 2006 | Peloponnesian Beauty Pageant | Herself (host) | TV special |
| 2006-2008 | Proinos Kafes | Herself (co-host) | Daytime talk show on ANT1; season 16-17 |
| 2007 | Peloponnesian Beauty Pageant | Herself (host) | TV special |
| 2007-2008 | Daddy's Girls | Celia Roda | Main role, 26 episodes |
| 2008 | Lola | Herself | 2 episodes |
| 2008-2011 | Mega Star | Herself (host) | Saturday talk show on MEGA; season 20-22 |
| 2009 | My Beloved Neighbours | Herself | 1 episode |
| 2009-2010 | Guinness World Record Show | Herself (host) | Game show on MEGA; season 1 |
| 2009-2010 | I Polykatoikia | Herself | 4 episodes |
| 2010 | M+M | Herself | 1 episode |
| 2010 | Talk Dirty to me | Herself | Episode: "End of an era" |
| 2010 | National Annual Beauty Pageant of Greece | Herself (performance) | TV special |
| 2010 | Playmate of the Year | Herself (judge) | TV special |
| 2010-2011 | Just the 2 Of Us | Herself (contestant) | 8 episodes; season 1 |
| 2011 | The life of the other woman | Herself | 4 episodes |
| 2011 | Playmate of the Year | Herself (host) | TV special |
| 2011 | MAD Video Music Awards | Herself (performance) | TV special |
| 2012 | MadWalk - The Fashion Music Project | Herself (performance) | TV special |
| 2012 | MAD Video Music Awards | Herself (performance) | TV special |
| 2013-2014 | Dancing with the Stars | Herself (contestant) | Runner-up; season 4 |
| 2014 | MAD Video Music Awards | Herself (performance) | TV special |
| 2014 | Your Family | Herself | Episode: "The painting" |
| 2015 | MadWalk - The Fashion Music Project | Herself (performance) | TV special |
| 2016 | MAD Video Music Awards | Herself (performance) | TV special |
| 2017 | Your Face Sounds Familiar | Herself (guest) | Live 11; season 4 |
| 2018 | MAD Video Music Awards | Herself (performance) | TV special |
| 2018 | National Annual Beauty Pageant of Greece | Herself (performance) | TV special |
| 2019 | Your Face Sounds Familiar | Herself (contestant) | Runner-up; season 5 |
| 2019 | Throw the fryer away | Kirki | Episode: "The storm" |
| 2019–2020 | If I were rich | Froso Vrouva | Lead role, 137 episodes |
| 2020 | My Style Rocks | Herself (host) | Daytime fashion show based on Style to Rock; season 3-4 |
| 2020 | 2020 Madame Figaro Awards - Women of the Year | Herself (host) | TV special |
| 2021 | Your Face Sounds Familiar: All Star | Herself (contestant) | 11 episodes; season 7 |
| 2021–2024 | Just the 2 Of Us | Herself (host) | Talent show; season 5-8 |
| 2022 | The Masked Singer | Scarecrow / Herself (guest judge) | Episode 10; season 1 |
| 2022 | MAD Video Music Awards | Herself (performance) | TV special |
| 2023 | Cretan Annual Beauty Pageant | Herself (host) | TV special |
| 2024 | National Annual Beauty Pageant of Greece | Herself (host) | TV special |
| 2025 | Mothers | Herself (host) | Episode: "Mothers with Katerina Stikoudi" |
| 2025 | National Annual Beauty Pageant of Greece | Herself (host) | TV special |
| 2026 | Well Living with Katerina Stikoudi | Herself (host) | Talk show on ERT2 Sport; also creator |
| 2026 | Super Heroes | Herself | 1 episode |
| 2026-2027 | Blue Moments | Vasia Politi | Main role, Upcoming soap opera |

=== Film ===
| Year | Title | Role | Notes | Ref. |
|---|---|---|---|---|
| 2009 | Soula Ela Xana | TV hostess | Film debut | |
| 2017 | The Treasure | Sharon Chaido Manolakou | | |
| 2018 | We did it all together! | Margarita | | |
| 2021 | The Black Bachelor 4 | Eda | | |
| 2023 | The groom is shaved in the end | Vicky Bakou | | |
| 2026 | What Soul Will You Deliver, You Fool Woman?: Part 2 | presbytera Lambrena | | |

=== Music videos ===
| Year | Music video | Artist | Notes |
|---|---|---|---|
| 2005 | "Eisai Teleia" | 4play | As an actress |
| 2007 | "Kano ena tsigaro kai tin kano" | Christos Sarlanis | As an actress |
| 2009 | "Tora" | LAVA & Herself | Music debut |
| 2010 | "Emmoni" | NEBMA & Herself | |
| 2011 | "6 ekatommyria" | Herself | |
| 2011 | "I Mousiki Mou" | Herself | |
| 2012 | "Scenario" | Herself | |
| 2012 | "Mi" | Herself | |
| 2012 | "Ap' tin arhi" | Herself | |
| 2012 | "OK (Den trehei tipota)" | Herself | |
| 2012 | "San na min yparho" | Herself | |
| 2013 | "Psila Takounia" | Herself | |
| 2013 | "Milia Makria" | Herself & Ablaze | |
| 2013 | "Me ena sou fili" | Herself | |
| 2014 | "S' ena oneiro" | Herself | |
| 2014 | "I Gefsi tis zois mou" | Herself | |
| 2014 | "Tatouaz" | Herself | |
| 2015 | "Cliché" | Herself | |
| 2015 | "Synnefia" | Herself | |
| 2015 | "Tha sou perasei" | NEBMA & Herself | |
| 2016 | "Voices" | Herself | |
| 2016 | "I Like the way" | Herself | |
| 2016 | "Piranhas" | TNS & Herself | |
| 2016 | "Fylakto" | Herself | |
| 2016 | "Oxygono" | Naya & Herself | |
| 2017 | "Retro" | Herself | |
| 2017 | "Kano oti de vlepo" | Herself | |
| 2018 | "Enthade Keitai" | Herself | |
| 2018 | "Mi viasteis na megaloseis" | Herself | |
| 2018 | "Botox" | Herself | |
| 2018 | "16 Aprili" | Herself | |
| 2018 | "Karma" | Herself | |
| 2018 | "Ap' to tipota" | Herself | |
| 2019 | "Apo mia alli epohi" | Herself | |
| 2019 | "Gymni Alithia" | Herself | |
| 2019 | "To Xerame ki oi dyo" | Herself | |
| 2020 | "Diafero" | Herself | |
| 2020 | "Oi Istories Mas" | Herself & Eleftheria Eleftheriou | |
| 2020 | "Ta Hristougenna mou esy" | Herself | |
| 2021 | "All in" | Herself, DJ Stephan & Lil Pop | |
| 2021 | "Grande" | Herself, KINGS & KG | |
| 2021 | "Ekdikisi" | Herself | |
| 2021 | "Rio" | Herself, Mc Daddy & Dinamiss | |
| 2021 | "Suelta" | Herself & Jasari | |
| 2021 | "Tis Kardias to Kleidi" | Herself | |
| 2021 | "Den tha pligotheis" | Herself | |
| 2022 | "40 Meres" | Herself | |
| 2022 | "Thelo piso ton palio mou eafto" | Herself | |
| 2023 | "Rockstar" | Herself, Dj Teez & Vamus | |
| 2023 | "Évidemment: Duet Version" | Herself & La Zarra | |
| 2023 | "Poly poly poly" | Herself | |
| 2023 | "Have Yourself a Merry Little Christmas (2023 version)" | Herself & Stelios Kerasidis | |
| 2024 | "Bomba" | Herself & Ghetto Queen | |
| 2025 | "Apistefto" | Herself & Joanne | |
| 2025 | "Xipnisa Xtes" | Herself | |
| 2025 | "Crossfit Barz" | Herself | |
| 2025 | "Social Media" | Herself & Elena Tsagrinou | |
| 2025 | "No Feat" | Herself | |

== Discography ==
=== Albums ===
- I Mousiki Mou (2010)
- I Yefsi Tis Zois Mou (2013)
- Cliche (2015)
- Soundtrack (2018)
- Grande (2021)
- F.A.M.E (F*ck All My Enemies) (2025)

=== Singles ===
- 2009: Τώρα / Tora (Feat. LAVA)
- 2010: Εμμονή / Emmoni (Feat. NEBMA)
- 2011: 6 Εκατομμύρια / 6 Ekatommyria
- 2011: Η Μουσική Μου / I Mousiki Mou
- 2012: Σενάριο / Senario
- 2012: Μη / Mi
- 2012: Απ' Την Αρχή / Ap' Tin Arxi
- 2012: Ο.Κ. (Δεν Τρέχει Τίποτα) / O.K. (Den Trexei Tipota)
- 2012: Σαν Να Μην Υπάρχω / San Na Min Yparxo
- 2013: Ψηλά Τακούνια / Psila Takounia
- 2013: Μίλια Μακριά / Milia Makria (Feat. Ablaze)
- 2013: Μ' Ένα Σου Φιλί / M' Ena Sou Fili
- 2014: Σ' Ένα Όνειρο / S' Ena Oneiro
- 2014: Η Γεύση Της Ζωής Μου / I Geysi Tis Zois Mou
- 2014: Τατουάζ / Tatouaz
- 2015: Cliche
- 2015: Συννεφιά / Synnefia
- 2015: Θα Σου Περάσει / Tha Sou Perasei (Feat. NEBMA)
- 2016: Voices
- 2016: I Like The Way
- 2016: Πιράνχας / Piranxas (Feat. TNS)
- 2017: Retro
- 2018: Intuited
- 2023: Évidemment

== Stage ==
=== Theater ===
| Production | Year | Theater | Role |
|---|---|---|---|
| Annie | 2019 | Tae Kwon Do Theater | Lily St. Regis |
| The Full Monty | 2022-2023 | Theater Vembo | Laura |

=== Tours ===
- LAVA feat. Katerina Stikoudi Summer Tour (2009)
- NEBMA feat. Katerina Stikoudi Summer Tour (2010)
- Katerina Stikoudi Summer Tour (2011)
- Katerina Stikoudi Summer Tour (2012)
- Katerina Stikoudi Summer Tour (2013)
- Katerina Stikoudi Summer Tour (2014)
- Katerina Stikoudi Live Tour (2014-2015)
- Katerina Stikoudi Summer Tour (2017)
- Soundtrack Tour (2018)

=== Stage Shows ===
- Thea (along with Nikos Oikonomopoulos & Elli Kokkinou) - (2012)
- Fever (along with Nikos Oikonomopoulos & Stamatis Gonidis) - (2012-2013)
- Fix Live (along with Nikos Oikonomopoulos, Melisses & Maria Egglezou) (2013)
- VOX (along with Panos Kalidis, Christos Holidis & Chrispa) - (2013-2014)
- Astra Live (along with Panos Kalidis & Ilia Vrettos) - (2014)
- Dames (along with Kostas Doxas) (2015)
- Fix Live (along with Stamatis Gonidis & Giorgos Tsalikis) - (2015-2016)
- Fix Live (along with Adypas & Andreas Stamos) - (2017)
- EuroPride 2019: Visions of Pride in Vienna - (2019)
- Ieros Odos (along with Vasilis Karras, Yannis Ploutarchos & Elli Kokkinou) - (2019-2020)
- EuroPride 2022: Welcome to the future, where everyone can join in Thessaloniki - (2022)
- Stage by Frangelico (along with Stamatis Gonidis & Christos Menidiatis) - (2022)
- EuroPride 2022: It's time in Belgrade - (2022)
- EuroPride 2023: Equality from the Heart in Malta - (2023)
- EuroPride 2024: Persevere - Progress - Prosper in Thessaloniki - (2024)
- Athens Pride 2025: We Count - (2025)
- Bodega Live Stage (along with Giannis Tassios & Kyriakos Kyanos) - (2025-2026)

== Personal life ==
In January 2009, Stikoudi began dating music producer, rapper and philologist Vangelis Serifis after he appeared as a guest on her show Mega Star to talk about his group's new released songs. On August 25, 2018, after a longtime relationship, they married in the church of Serifi's place of origin, in Thesprotia. On October 18, 2021 Stikoudi gave birth to their first child, a son, Byron Serifis and on February 14, 2024 gave birth to their second son, Nikolas Serifis.

== Appearances ==
- FHM
- STATUS Magazine
- Maxim
