= Giorgos Tsalikis =

Greek Laïko singer (born 1975)

- Born: Georgios Aggeloudakis; October 25, 1975 (age 50); Stylida, Greece
- Genres: Laïko
- Occupation: Singer
- Years active: 2001–present
- Label: Universal Music

Giorgos Tsalikis (Greek: Γιώργος Τσαλίκης; born 25 October 1975) is a Greek laïko music singer.

== Discography ==
=== Albums ===
- Αν ήμουνα παλιόπαιδο (Universal Music, 2001) Gold
- Για σένα ξενυχτάω (Universal Music, 2002) Gold
- Έκανα την νύχτα μέρα (Universal Music, 2003) Gold
- Ο τέλειος άντρας (Universal Music, 2004)
- Πυρετός (Universal Music, 2005)
- Αγάπη Αχάριστη (Universal Music, 2006)
- Τσαλίκης live (Universal Music, 2006)
- Ένοχα βράδια (Universal Music, 2007)
- 10 χρόνια: Οι μεγαλύτερες επιτυχίες + 3 νέα τραγούδια (Universal Music,2010)
- Στο υπογράφω (Παπαπολιτικά, 2012) 3xPlatinum
- Κρυφτό (GABI Music, 2016)

=== Singles ===
- "Θέλω να ονειρεύομαι μαζί σου" [cd single, 2003] Platinum
- "Πάρα Πολύ" (cd-single, Cobalt Music, 2009)
- "Στα πατώματα" (single, 2009)
- "Τα περαστικά μου" (single Universal Music, 2009) ft Master Tempo
- "Πάρ'το απόφαση" (single Universal Music, 2009) ft Master Tempo
- "Αν ήσουν αγάπη" [single, 2011]
- "Πανικός" [single, 2011]
- "Ξέχνα τα παλιά'" (single, 2011)
- "Δεν σου κάνω τον Άγιο" (Universal Music, single, 2013)
- "Απαγορευμένο" (Universal, single, 2013)
- "Θέλεις Πόλεμο" (GABI Music, 2013)
- "Απαγορευμένο 2 (GABI Music, 2013)
- "Είμαι μια χαρά"" (GABI Music, 2013)
- "Estar Loco" (GABI Music, 2014) ft Azis
- "Cocktail" (Epic Music, 2017) ft Kings
- "Σαντορίνη - Ομόνοια" (Spin Records, 2017)
- "Τρελός" (Epic Music, 2018)
- "Ανατροπή" (Epic Music, 2018)
- "Χωρίς Εσένα" (GABI Music, 2019)
- "Το Κομμένο Μου Τσιγάρο" (Heaven Music, 2020)
- "Φταίς" (Heaven Music, 2021)
- "Εσύ Τι Να Μου Πείς" (Heaven Music, 2021)
- "Σε Έχω Ήδη Ξεπεράσει" (Panik Platinum, 2022)

== Filmography ==
=== Television ===
Year	Title	Role	Notes
2001-2002	Deka Mikroi Mitsoi (Ten Little Mitsoi)	Himself	2 episodes
2004	MAD Video Music Awards	Himself (performance)	TV special
2005	MAD Video Music Awards	Himself (performance)	TV special
2005	Chicken Little (2005 film)	Chicken Little (voice)	Greek dub
2006	Peninta Peninta (Fifty Fifty)	Himself	1 episode
2006	I Ora i Kali (The time is good)	Himself	1 episode
2006-2007	Soundmix Show	Himself (judge)	Talent show
2007	Latremenoi Mou Geitones (My Beloved Neighbours)	Himself	2 episodes
2008-2009	Password	Himself (host)	Game show
2009-2010	Deste tous! (Look at them!)	Himself (host)	Daytime talk show; season 1
2012-2013	Dancing with the Stars	Himself (contestant)	Season 3; 8 episodes
2015	Kato Partali	doctor	1 episode
2020	The Booth	Himself (guest host)	1 episode
2020	Just the 2 Of Us	Himself (contestant)	Season 4; 11 episodes
2022	Ti Fasi? (What Happens?)	Himself (host)	Prank show; season 3
