= Dancing with the Stars (Greek TV series) season 4 =

Dancing with the Stars
- Season 4
- Celebrity winner: Isaias Matiamba
- Professional winner: Maria Antimisari
- No. of episodes: 15

Release
- Original network: ANT1
- Original release: October 20, 2013 – February 2, 2014

Season chronology
- ← Previous; Season 3 Next → Season 5

The Greek reality show version of Dancing with the Stars returned for its fourth season on October 20, 2013 from ANT1 TV channel. The show is based on the United Kingdom BBC Television series Strictly Come Dancing and is part of BBC Worldwide's Dancing with the Stars franchise. The theme song is "It's personal" performed by Swedish indie pop band The Radio Dept.

The host of this season was Doukissa Nomikou while on the backstage was the season three winner, Ntoretta Papadimitriou.

Giannis Latsios, Alexis Kostalas, Galena Velikova and Katia Dandoulaki returned as the judges of the show.

Of the celebrities that competed, 8 were female and 6 were male. The competitors were as follows: Chrispa, Katerina Stikoudi, Klelia Pantazi, Konstantina, Mary Synatsaki, Gogo Mastrokosta, Evagelia Aravani, Eleni Chatzidou, Lakis Gavalas, Michalis Mouroutsos, Thanos Kallioras, Sakis Arseniou, Isaias Matiamba and Alex Kavdas. Their professional partners were revealed on October 17, 2013.

On November 16, 2013, it was announced that on week 4, Giorgos Liagkas would make a guest appearance on the show and would be the fifth judge for the night. On week 8 Eugenia Manolidou, who competed in the first season of the show and got third place, was the second guest judge of the season. On week 9 the show had its third guest judge, Themos Anastasiadis. The three guests gave a score to the contestants but their score was symbolic and didn't count for the final result of that week.

On week 7, the couples were free to choose a favorite song of theirs to dance to and the routine was Freestyle.

At the end of the show of week 12, it was announced to the couples that they were going to dance to a trio challenge for their second dance the upcoming week. The third partner would be one of the previous stars of the season who got eliminated or a star from previous seasons of the show. From season 4, Aravani and Kavdas came back, while Elias Vrettos and Laura Narjes from season 3 also came back to dance with two of the couples. Vrettos and Narjes finished on second and third place of season 3 respectively.

On week 14, the stars for their second dance were challenged to dance a solo whole choreography without their pro partners.

This season lasted for 15 weeks due to one week with no elimination. It's the first season to last that long. For the final week, the audience was able to vote during the whole week and the winner was decided only by the public vote. Judges' scores did not count for the final result.

== Judges ==
- Alexis Kostalas, announcer, sports commentator
- Galena Velikova, choreographer, dancer, dance teacher. Galena has also been a judge at Dancing Stars, the Bulgarian version of the show, for seasons 1&3.
- Giannis Latsios, ANT1 television program manager
- Katia Dandoulaki, actress

== Couples ==
Celebrity	Occupation	Professional partner	Status
Konstantina	Singer	Dionisis Valmis	Eliminated 1st on October 27, 2013
Sakis Arseniou	Singer	Nikoletta Mauridi	Eliminated 2nd on November 3, 2013
Eleni Chatzidou	Singer	Giorgos Ketseridis	Eliminated 3rd on November 17, 2013
Gogo Mastrokosta	Personal trainer	Thodoris Panagakos	Eliminated 4th on November 24, 2013
Thanos Kallioras	Actor	Fotini Papastravrou	Eliminated 5th on December 1, 2013
Chrispa	Singer	Vaggelis Holevas; Thodoris Panagakos (Week 7)	Eliminated 6th on December 8, 2013
Alex Kavdas	TV personality	Claudia-Anna Stoyia	Eliminated 7th on December 15, 2013
Evangelia Aravani	Fashion model	Vladimir Morotsko	Eliminated 8th on December 22, 2013
Michalis Mouroutsos	Olympic taekwondo athlete	Anna Polyzou	Eliminated 9th on January 5, 2014
Lakis Gavalas	Fashion designer	Anastasia Draka	Eliminated 10th on January 12, 2014
Mary Synatsaki	TV hostess	Yuri Dimitrov	Eliminated 11th on January 19, 2014
Klelia Pantazi	Olympic gymnast	Paulos Manogiannakis	Third place on January 26, 2014
Katerina Stikoudi	Fashion model, Singer	Elias Boutsis	Runner-up on February 2, 2014
Isaias Matiamba	Singer	Maria Antimisari	Winner on February 2, 2014

== Scoring chart ==
Couple	Place	1	2	1+2	3	4	5	6	7	8	9	10	11	10+11	12	13	14	15
Isaias & Maria	1	22	23	45	22	24	27	26	26	31	34	35+37=72	36+36=72	72+72=144	36+39=75	37+38=75	37+40=77	40+40+40=120
Katerina & Elias	2	22	20	42	26	25	28	25	27	29	33	36+34=70	37+34=71	70+71=141	35+40=75	36+40=76	39+38=77	40+36+40=116
Klelia & Paulos	3	28	24	52	21	28	26	29	26	33	34+5=39	36+37=73	—	73	33+40=73	34+40=74	38+37=75	
Mary & Yuri	4	23	21	44	21	28	28	28	30	28	32	28+37=65	34+36=70	65+70=135	34+37=71	36+38=74		
Lakis & Anastasia	5	20	19	39	20	21	22	24	20	24	27	26+34=60	27+28=55	60+55=115	30+32=62			
Michalis & Anna	6	27	18	45	23	21	22	26	32	33	30	35+34=69	32+33=65	69+65=134				
Evagelia & Vladimir	7	26	25	51	24	26	24	29	28	32	32							
Alex & Claudia-Anna	8	24	23	47	25	20	26	19	28	26								
Chrispa & Vaggelis	9	23	17	40	20	18	24	24	24									
Thanos & Fotini	10	23	19	42	19	20	24	23										
Gogo & Thodoris	11	22	20	42	23	23	22											
Eleni & Giorgos	12	22	19	41	16	20												
Sakis & Nikoletta	13	26	15	41	20													
Konstantina & Dionisis	14	22	18	40														

Red numbers indicate the lowest score for each week
Green numbers indicate the highest score for each week
the couple got the lowest score of the night and was eliminated that week
the couple eliminated that week
the returning couple finishing in the bottom two
the winning couple
the runner-up couple
the third-place couple

=== Average score chart ===
This table only counts for dances scored on a traditional 40-points scale. The points of Giorgos Liagkas in week 4 and Eugenia Manolidou's in week 8 are not included. Also, the extra five points Klelia won on the Christmas Rock n Roll Marathon are not included.

Rank by average	Place	Couple	Total	Dances	Average
1	1	Isaias & Maria	726	22	33.0
2	2	Katerina & Elias	720	22	32.7
3	3	Klelia & Paulos	544	17	32.0
4	4	Mary & Yuri	519	17	30.5
5	6	Michalis & Anna	360	13	27.7
6	7	Evagelia & Vladimir	246	9	27.3
7	5	Lakis & Anastasia	374	15	24.9
8	8	Alex & Claudia-Anna	191	8	23.9
9	11	Gogo & Thodoris	110	5	22.0
10	9	Chrispa & Vaggelis	150	7	21.4
11	10	Thanos & Fotini	128	6	21.3
12	13	Sakis & Nikoletta	61	3	20.3
13	14	Konstantina & Dionisis	40	2	20.0
14	12	Eleni & Giorgos	77	4	19.3

== Highest and lowest scoring performances ==
Dance	Best Dancer	Best Score	Worst Dancer	Worst Score
Cha-Cha-Cha	Klelia Pantazi; Katerina Stikoudi	40	Eleni Chatzidou, Konstantina; Gogo Mastrokosta, Katerina Stikoudi	22
Tango	Michalis Mouroutsos	33	Lakis Gavalas	20
Viennese Waltz	Katerina Stikoudi; Isaias Matiamba	40	Chrispa	17
Jive	Isaias Matiamba	40	Sakis Arseniou	15
Samba	Katerina Stikoudi	40	Eleni Chatzidou	16
Paso Doble	Katerina Stikoudi	39	Thanos Kallioras	19
Freestyle	Katerina Stikoudi	37	Chrispa	18
Rumba	Katerina Stikoudi	36	Gogo Mastrokosta	22
Bachata	Lakis Gavalas	28	Michalis Mouroutsos; Lakis Gavalas	22
Argentine Tango	Klelia Pantazi	40	Chrispa	24
Mambo	Isaias Matiamba	38	Alex Kavdas	19
Quickstep	Mary Synatsaki; Katerina Stikoudi	36	Lakis Gavalas	26
Salsa	Klelia Pantazi; Katerina Stikoudi	36	Mary Synatsaki	28
Foxtrot	Isaias Matiamba	37	Klelia Pantazi	33
Fusion dance	Klelia Pantazi; Michalis Mouroutsos	33	Lakis Gavalas	24
Solo	Isaias Matiamba	40	Klelia Pantazi	37
Dance-off	Katerina Stikoudi; Isaias Matiamba	40	-	-

== Couples' highest and lowest scoring dances ==
According to the traditional 40-point scale:

Couples	Highest scoring dance(s)	Lowest scoring dance(s)
Evagelia & Vladimir	Fusion Dance, Freestyle (32)	Samba, Rumba (24)
Sakis & Nikoletta	Tango (26)	Jive (15)
Eleni & Giorgos	Cha-Cha-Cha (22)	Samba (16)
Chrispa & Vaggelis	Rumba, Argentine Tango, Freestyle (24)	Viennese Waltz (17)
Lakis & Anastasia	Jive (32)	Jive (19)
Thanos & Fotini	Bachata (24)	Jive, Paso Doble (19)
Alex & Claudia-Anna	Freestyle (28)	Mambo (19)
Konstantina & Dionisis	Cha-Cha-Cha (22)	Viennese Waltz (18)
Gogo & Thodoris	Samba, Freestyle (23)	Viennese Waltz (20)
Isaias & Maria	Solo, Viennese Waltz, Jive, Dance-off (40)	Tango, Paso Doble (22)
Michalis & Anna	Quickstep (35)	Jive (18)
Klelia & Paulos	Cha-Cha-Cha, Argentine Tango (40)	Samba (21)
Katerina & Elias	Cha-Cha-Cha, Samba, Viennese Waltz, Dance-off (40)	Viennese Waltz (20)
Mary & Yuri	Samba (38)	Viennese Waltz, Samba (21)

== Weekly scores ==
Unless indicated otherwise, individual judges scores in the charts below (given in parentheses) are listed in this order from left to right: Alexis Kostalas, Galena Velikova, Giannis Latsios and Katia Dandoulaki.

=== Week 1 ===
Running order

Couple	Score	Dance	Music
Evagelia & Vladimir	26 (6, 7, 7, 6)	Cha-Cha-Cha	"Domino"—Jessie J
Mary & Yuri	23 (6, 6, 6, 5)	Cha-Cha-Cha	"Love Me Again"—John Newman
Isaias & Maria	22 (5, 6, 5, 6)	Tango	"El Choclo"—Nat King Cole
Alex & Claudia-Anna	24 (6, 6, 6, 6)	Tango	"Bipolar Tango"—Johanna Juhola & Promoe
Klelia & Paulos	28 (7, 7, 7, 7)	Cha-Cha-Cha	"Summertime Sadness"—Lana Del Rey
Gogo & Thodoris	22 (5, 6, 5, 6)	Cha-Cha-Cha	"Forget You"—CeeLo Green
Michalis & Anna	27 (7, 7, 6, 7)	Tango	"Na klais"—Dimitra Galani
Katerina & Elias	22 (5, 6, 5, 6)	Cha-Cha-Cha	"What Makes You Beautiful"—One Direction
Lakis & Anastasia	20 (5, 5, 5, 5)	Tango	"Money, Money, Money"—Messaggi
Eleni & Giorgos	22 (5, 5, 6, 6)	Cha-Cha-Cha	"Mono An Thes Emena"—Giorgos Sampanis
Thanos & Fotini	23 (6, 5, 6, 6)	Tango	"Mia Stigmi Gia Panta"—George Dalaras
Konstantina & Dionisis	22 (5, 5, 6, 6)	Cha-Cha-Cha	"Argosvineis Moni"—Ioanna Georgakopoulou & Stelios Perpiniadis
Sakis & Nikoletta	26 (6, 7, 6, 7)	Tango	"Historia de un Amor"—Pedro Infante
Chrispa & Vagelis	23 (5, 6, 6, 6)	Cha-Cha-Cha	"Pao, Pao"—Elli Kokkinou

=== Week 2 ===
Running order

Couple	Score	Dance	Music	Result
Michalis & Anna	18 (4, 5, 5, 4)	Jive	"One Way or Another"—One Direction	Safe
Gogo & Thodoris	20 (5, 5, 5, 5)	Viennese Waltz	"Gramophone"—Eugen Doga	Safe
Sakis & Nikoletta	15 (4, 4, 3, 4)	Jive	"Runaround Sue"—Racey	Safe
Mary & Yuri	21 (5, 5, 5, 6)	Viennese Waltz	"Get Lucky"—Scott Bradlee & Postmodern jukebox	Safe
Chrispa & Vaggelis	17 (4, 4, 4, 5)	Viennese Waltz	"Kiss from a Rose"—Seal	Bottom two
Lakis & Anastasia	19 (5, 5, 4, 5)	Jive	"The Way You Make Me Feel"—Michael Jackson	Safe
Katerina & Elias	20 (4, 5, 5, 6)	Viennese Waltz	"Iris"—Goo Goo Dolls	Safe
Thanos & Fotini	19 (5, 4, 5, 5)	Jive	"Crazy Little Thing Called Love"—Michael Bublé	Safe
Klelia & Paulos	24 (6, 6, 6, 6)	Viennese Waltz	"An"—Dimitra Galani	Safe
Isaias & Maria	23 (5, 6, 6, 6)	Jive	"Personal Jesus"—Saints & Sinners	Safe
Konstantina & Dionisis	18 (4, 4, 5, 5)	Viennese Waltz	"Efta Potiria"—Giannis Kotsiras	Eliminated
Alex & Claudia-Anna	23 (6, 6, 5, 6)	Jive	"I'm a Believer"—Smash Mouth	Safe
Eleni & Giorgos	19 (5, 5, 4, 5)	Viennese Waltz	"Waltz No. 2"—Dmitri Shostakovich	Safe
Evagelia & Vladimir	25 (6, 7, 6, 6)	Viennese Waltz	"You Light Up My Life"—Whitney Houston	Safe

=== Week 3 ===
Running order

Couple	Score	Dance	Music	Result
Klelia & Paulos	21 (6, 5, 5, 5)	Samba	"La Vida Es Un Carnaval"—Michael Chacon	Safe
Thanos & Fotini	19 (5, 4, 5, 5)	Paso Doble	"El gato montés"— Banda De La Plaza De Toros	Safe
Mary & Yuri	21 (4, 6, 6, 5)	Samba	"Gasolina"—Daddy Yankee	Safe
Isaias & Maria	22 (5, 6, 6, 5)	Paso Doble	"Sweet Dreams"—Marilyn Manson	Safe
Eleni & Giorgos	16 (4, 4, 4, 4)	Samba	"Sex"—Elli Kokkinou	Safe
Katerina & Elias	26 (6, 7, 6, 7)	Samba	"Rich Girl"—Gwen Stefani ft. Eve	Safe
Alex & Claudia-Anna	25 (6, 6, 7, 6)	Paso Doble	"You Make Me Feel"—Archive	Safe
Chrispa & Vaggelis	20 (5, 5, 5, 5)	Samba	"To Kalokairi Mou"—Michalis Hatzigiannis	Bottom two
Lakis & Anastasia	20 (5, 5, 5, 5)	Paso Doble	"España cañí"—Luis Cobos	Safe
Evagelia & Vladimir	24 (6, 6, 6, 6)	Samba	"Whenever, Wherever"—Shakira	Safe
Sakis & Nikoletta	20 (5, 5, 5, 5)	Paso Doble	"Smooth Criminal"—The Moscow Symphony Orchestra	Eliminated
Gogo & Thodoris	23 (6, 5, 6, 6)	Samba	"Tic, Tic Tac"—Alayapi	Safe
Michalis & Anna	23 (5, 6, 7, 5)	Paso Doble	"Unstoppable"—E.S. Posthumus	Safe

=== Week 4: Greek night ===
This week the show had Giorgos Liagkas as a guest judge. Nomikou announced during the live show that Liagkas' score would be symbolic and it won't count for the final result of this week's elimination.

- Blue numbers indicate Liagkas' score.

Running order

Couple	Score	Dance	Music	Result
Alex & Claudia-Anna	20 (6, 5, 5, 4) + 5	Freestyle	"Mia Chara na Pernas"—Sakis Rouvas	Safe
Chrispa & Vaggelis	18 (5, 4, 4, 5) + 3	Freestyle	"I Zoi (To Pio Omorfo Tragoudi)"—Demy	Safe
Michalis & Anna	21 (5, 5, 6, 5) + 5	Freestyle	"O Ftochos"—Onirama	Safe
Evagelia & Vladimir	26 (7, 6, 6, 7) + 8	Freestyle	"Alla Mou Len ta Matia Sou"—Gadjo Dilo	Safe
Gogo & Thodoris	23 (6, 6, 6, 5) + 5	Freestyle	"Paidi Gennaio"—Konstantinos Argiros	Bottom two
Isaias & Maria	24 (5, 6, 7, 6) + 8	Freestyle	"Dikos Sou Gia Panta"—Michalis Rakintzis	Safe
Lakis & Anastasia	21 (5, 5, 5, 6) + 4	Freestyle	"Giati Fovase"—Marinella	Safe
Katerina & Elias	25 (6, 6, 6, 7) + 8	Freestyle	"Akoma"—Vegas	Safe
Eleni & Giorgos	20 (5, 5, 5, 5) + 6	Freestyle	"To Petinari"—Rena Vlahopoulou	Eliminated
Mary & Yuri	28 (7, 7, 7, 7) + 9	Freestyle	"Eleges"—Melisses	Safe
Thanos & Fotini	20 (5, 5, 5, 5) + 5	Freestyle	"To Tzini"—Giorgos Mazonakis	Safe
Klelia & Paulos	28 (7, 7, 7, 7) + 8	Freestyle	"Min Ksanartheis"—Antonis Remos	Safe

=== Week 5 ===
Running order

Couple	Score	Dance	Music	Result
Gogo & Thodoris	22 (5, 5, 6, 6)	Rumba	"Impossible"—James Arthur	Eliminated
Michalis & Anna	22 (6, 6, 6, 4)	Bachata	"Just the Way You Are"—Bruno Mars	Safe
Katerina & Elias	28 (7, 7, 7, 7)	Rumba	"Girl on Fire"—Alicia Keys	Safe
Thanos & Fotini	24 (6, 6, 6, 6)	Bachata	"Smooth Operator"—El Rubio Loco	Safe
Klelia & Paulos	26 (7, 6, 6, 7)	Rumba	"My Kind of Love"—Emeli Sandé	Safe
Isaias & Maria	27 (6, 7, 7, 7)	Bachata	"Obsesión"—Aventura	Safe
Mary & Yuri	28 (7, 7, 7, 7)	Rumba	"Just Hold Me"—Maria Mena	Safe
Alex & Claudia-Anna	26 (7, 6, 6, 7)	Bachata	"Careless Whisper"—D'Lesly	Bottom two
Evagelia & Vladimir	24 (6, 6, 6, 6)	Rumba	"Smells Like Teen Spirit"—Shanade	Safe
Lakis & Anastasia	22 (5, 6, 5, 6)	Bachata	"Say You, Say Me"—Jeyro	Safe
Chrispa & Vaggelis	24 (6, 6, 6, 6)	Rumba	"Stereotipa"—Dimitra Galani	Safe

=== Week 6 ===
Running order

Couple	Score	Dance	Music	Result
Katerina & Elias	25 (6, 6, 6, 7)	Argentine Tango	"Por una Cabeza"—Tango Project	Safe
Alex & Claudia-Anna	19 (5, 5, 5, 4)	Mambo	"Ran Kan Kan"—Tito Puente	Safe
Mary & Yuri	28 (7, 7, 7, 7)	Argentine Tango	"El Choclo"—Maria Grana	Safe
Thanos & Fotini	23 (6, 6, 5, 6)	Mambo	"Demasiado Corazon"—Willy DeVille	Eliminated
Chrispa & Vaggelis	24 (6, 6, 6, 6)	Argentine Tango	"Mind Games"—Eirini Douka & Greggy K	Bottom two
Michalis & Anna	26 (6, 7, 7, 6)	Mambo	"Johnny's mambo"—Michael Lloyd	Safe
Klelia & Paulos	29 (8, 7, 7, 7)	Argentine Tango	"Amado Mio"—Luz Casal	Safe
Isaias & Maria	26 (6, 7, 6, 7)	Mambo	"Maria"—Ricky Martin	Safe
Evagelia & Vladimir	29 (7, 8, 7, 7)	Argentine Tango	"Pleasure"—Claude Challe	Safe
Lakis & Anastasia	24 (6, 6, 6, 6)	Mambo	"Lambo"—Anna Vissi	Safe

=== Week 7: Favorite song ===
- Chrispa's partner, Vaggelis, couldn't be on the show for personal reasons this week and Thodoris stepped in for him.

Running order

Couple	Score	Dance	Music	Result
Klelia & Paulos	26 (7, 6, 6, 7)	Freestyle	"Rock You Like a Hurricane"—Scorpions	Safe
Alex & Claudia-Anna	28 (7, 7, 7, 7)	Freestyle	"All That Jazz"—Chicago	Safe
Evagelia & Vladimir	28 (7, 7, 7, 7)	Freestyle	"Unchained Melody"—The Righteous Brothers	Safe
Isaias & Maria	26 (6, 6, 7, 7)	Freestyle	"Loi"—Koffi Olomide	Safe
Chrispa & Thodoris	24 (6, 6, 6, 6)	Freestyle	"Imagine"—Eva Cassidy	Eliminated
Mary & Yuri	30 (8, 7, 8, 7)	Freestyle	"Breathe Me"—Sia	Safe
Lakis & Anastasia	20 (5, 5, 5, 5)	Freestyle	"Frozen"—Madonna	Safe
Michalis & Anna	32 (8, 8, 8, 8)	Freestyle	"Beat It"—Michael Jackson	Safe
Katerina & Elias	27 (7, 6, 7, 7)	Freestyle	"Mes To Mialo Mou"—NEBMA feat. Stan	Bottom two

=== Week 8: Dance Fusion Week ===
This week the show had Eugenia Manolidou as a guest judge. Nomikou announced during the live show that Manolidou's score would be symbolic and it won't count for the final result of this week's elimination.

- Blue numbers indicate Manolidou's score.

Running order

Couple	Score	Dance(s)	Music	Result
Mary & Yuri	28 (7, 7, 7, 7) + 8	Bachata	"Killing Me Softly with His Song"—Rebecca Kingsley feat. Wyclef Jean	Safe
Mary & Yuri	28 (7, 7, 7, 7) + 8	Waltz	"Masquerade suite: I Waltz"—Philharmonia Orchestra & Aram Khachaturian	Safe
Lakis & Anastasia	24 (6, 6, 6, 6) + 8	Foxtrot	"Eye of the Tiger"—Paul Anka	Safe
Lakis & Anastasia	24 (6, 6, 6, 6) + 8	Mambo	"Mambo No. 5"—Lou Bega	Safe
Evagelia & Vladimir	32 (8, 8, 8, 8) + 10	Quickstep	"Walking on Sunshine"—Katrina and the Waves	Safe
Evagelia & Vladimir	32 (8, 8, 8, 8) + 10	Samba	"Ooh La La La"—Los Chicos	Safe
Alex & Claudia-Anna	26 (7, 6, 6, 7) + 9	Rumba	"What About Now"—Westlife	Eliminated
Alex & Claudia-Anna	26 (7, 6, 6, 7) + 9	Paso Doble	"The Wild Boys"—Duran Duran	Eliminated
Katerina & Elias	29 (7, 7, 7, 8) + 8	Jive	"Bleeding Love"—The Baseballs	Safe
Katerina & Elias	29 (7, 7, 7, 8) + 8	Rumba	"Read All About It"—Emeli Sandé	Safe
Isaias & Maria	31 (7, 8, 8, 8) + 7	Waltz	"Tosa Kalokairia"—Dakis	Bottom two
Isaias & Maria	31 (7, 8, 8, 8) + 7	Jive	"Hound Dog"—Elvis Presley	Bottom two
Klelia & Paulos	33 (9, 8, 8, 8) + 10	Paso Doble	"Das Lied Vom Tod"—Tanz Orchester Klaus Hallen	Safe
Klelia & Paulos	33 (9, 8, 8, 8) + 10	Cha-Cha-Cha	"Cuentame Que Te Paso"—Pepe & The Bottle Blondes	Safe
Michalis & Anna	33 (8, 8, 9, 8) + 8	Quickstep	"Puttin' on the Ritz"—Robbie Williams	Safe
Michalis & Anna	33 (8, 8, 9, 8) + 8	Bachata	"Te Extraño"—X-Treme	Safe

=== Week 9: Christmas show ===
- This week the show had Themos Anastasiadis as a guest judge but Anastasiadis didn't give score for the couples.
- All the couples competed in a Christmas Rock n Roll Marathon. The winner couple took 5 extra points from the judges while the rest couples didn't get scored.

Running order

Couple	Score	Dance	Music	Result
Michalis & Anna	30 (8, 7, 8, 7)	Freestyle	"Santa Claus Is Coming to Town"—Michael Bublé	Safe
Katerina & Elias	33 (8, 8, 8, 9)	Freestyle	"Chronia Polla"—Sakis Rouvas	Safe
Isaias & Maria	34 (8, 9, 9, 8)	Freestyle	"Frosty the Snowman"—Big Bad Voodoo Daddy	Safe
Mary & Yuri	32 (8, 8, 8, 8)	Freestyle	"The Little Drummer Boy"—Future of Forestry	Bottom two
Lakis & Anastasia	27 (7, 6, 7, 7)	Freestyle	"Silent Night"—Taylor Swift	Safe
Klelia & Paulos	34 (9, 8, 8, 9)	Freestyle	"Carol of the Bells"—Sixpence None the Richer	Safe
Evagelia & Vladimir	32 (8, 8, 8, 8)	Freestyle	"Home for Christmas"—Maria Mena	Eliminated
Klelia & Paulos; Mary & Yuri; Evagelia & Vladimir; Isaias & Maria; Michalis & Anna; Katerina & Elias; Lakis & Anastasia	5; 0; 0; 0; 0; 0; 0	Christmas; Rock n Roll; Marathon	"Santa Claus Is Coming to Town"—Bing Crosby & The Andrews Sisters "Jingle Bells"—Ιnstrumental "Christougenna"—Despina Vandi "Blue Suede Shoes"—Johnny Vavouras & The Cadilacs	

=== Week 10: Team dances ===
- This week the couple with the highest combined score from judges and viewers got immunity and was safe for next week.
- There was no elimination this week.

Running order

Couple	Score	Dance	Music	Result
Lakis & Anastasia	26 (7, 7, 6, 6)	Quickstep	"Pump Up the Jam"—The Lost Fingers	Safe
Katerina & Elias	36 (9, 9, 9, 9)	Salsa	"Lady"—Orquesta La Palabra	Safe
Mary & Yuri	28 (7, 7, 7, 7)	Salsa	"Une Belle Histoire"—Yuri Buenaventura	Safe
Michalis & Anna	35 (9, 9, 8, 9)	Quickstep	"Take On Me"—Reel Big Fish	Safe
Isaias & Maria	35 (9, 9, 9, 8)	Quickstep	"It Don't Mean a Thing (If It Ain't Got That Swing)"—Herman Brood	Safe
Klelia & Paulos	36 (9, 9, 9, 9)	Salsa	"Oh, Pretty Woman"—Tommy Olivencia & Orchestra	Safe & immunity for next week
Lakis & Anastasia; Michalis & Anna; Katerina & Elias	34 (8, 8, 9, 9)	Team Paso Doble; Metallico	"Enter Sandman"—Metallica	
Isaias & Maria; Klelia & Paulos; Mary & Yuri	37 (9, 9, 10, 9)	Team Paso Doble; Classico	"Ira Deorum"—James Dooley	

=== Week 11: 24-hour challenge ===
- Nomikou announced during the live show that Klelia, who won the immunity the previous week, was not going to get scored for her dance and that she was excluded from the 24-hour challenge.

Running order

Couple	Score	Dance	Music	Result
Katerina & Elias	37 (10, 9, 9, 9)	Freestyle	"Get the Party Started"—Shirley Bassey	Bottom two
Katerina & Elias	34 (9, 8, 9, 8)	Viennese Waltz	"Krifto"—Natassa Mpofiliou	Bottom two
Michalis & Anna	32 (8, 8, 8, 8)	Freestyle	"Relax"—Frankie Goes to Hollywood	Eliminated
Michalis & Anna	33 (9, 8, 8, 8)	Tango	"Tango Libertango"—Grace Jones	Eliminated
Mary & Yuri	34 (8, 8, 9, 9)	Freestyle	"Enough Is Enough"—Barbra Streisand & Donna Summer	Safe
Mary & Yuri	36 (9, 9, 9, 9)	Samba	"Hips Don't Lie (Bamboo Remix)"—Shakira	Safe
Isaias & Maria	36 (9, 9, 10, 8)	Freestyle	"Charleston"—Enoch Light & The Charleston City All Stars	Safe
Isaias & Maria	36 (8, 9, 9, 10)	Paso Doble	"Village Attack"—James Newton Howard	Safe
Lakis & Anastasia	27 (7, 7, 6, 7)	Freestyle	"Campesino"—Dann Georgie	Safe
Lakis & Anastasia	28 (7, 7, 7, 7)	Bachata	"How Deep Is Your Love? (Bachata Club Mix)"—Bongo+Plus	Safe
Klelia & Paulos	Not scored	Freestyle	"Fame"—Irene Cara	Safe (Immunity from last week)

=== Week 12: Solo night ===
Running order

Couple	Score	Dance	Music	Result
Klelia & Paulos	33 (9, 8, 8, 8)	Foxtrot	"Fly Me to the Moon"—Frank Sinatra	Safe
Klelia & Paulos	40 (10, 10, 10, 10)	Cha-Cha-Cha	"Corazón Espinado"—Santana & Maná	Safe
Isaias & Maria	36 (9, 9, 9, 9)	Cha-Cha-Cha	"Summertime"—Billy Stewart	Safe
Isaias & Maria	39 (10, 10, 9, 10)	Jive	"Somebody Told Me"—The Killers	Safe
Mary & Yuri	34 (8, 9, 9, 8)	Foxtrot	"The Way You Look Tonight"—Maroon 5	Bottom two
Mary & Yuri	37 (9, 9, 10, 9)	Cha-Cha-Cha	"Ai No Corrida"—Vania Borges feat. Quincy Jones	Bottom two
Lakis & Anastasia	30 (7, 7, 8, 8)	Cha-Cha-Cha	"Madame (Padam Padam)"—Panos Mouzourakis	Eliminated
Lakis & Anastasia	32 (8, 8, 8, 8)	Jive	"Paparazzi"— The Baseballs	Eliminated
Katerina & Elias	35 (8, 9, 9, 9)	Foxtrot	"Hot Stuff"—China Moses & Rafael Lemonnier	Safe
Katerina & Elias	40 (10, 10, 10, 10)	Cha-Cha-Cha	"Titanium"—David Guetta feat. Sia	Safe

=== Week 13: Trio challenge ===
- For the trio challenge the couples were partnered with a previous star of the current season or a previous season. The couples chose their third partner by drawing envelopes at the end of the show of week 12. Stikoudi & Pantazi danced with Aravani & Kavdas (season 4) respectively and Matiamba & Synatsaki danced with Laura Narjes & Elias Vrettos (season 3) respectively.

Running order

Couple	Score	Dance	Music	Result
Mary & Yuri (with Elias Vrettos)	36 (9, 9, 9, 9)	Quickstep	"Hey Pachuco"—Royal Crown Revue	Eliminated
Mary & Yuri (with Elias Vrettos)	38 (9, 10, 10, 9)	Samba	"Hips Don't Lie (Bamboo Mix)"—Shakira	Eliminated
Klelia & Paulos (with Alex Kavdas)	34 (9, 8, 8, 9)	Quickstep	"Sing, Sing, Sing"—Benny Goodman	Safe
Klelia & Paulos (with Alex Kavdas)	40 (10, 10, 10, 10)	Argentine Tango	"Amado Mio"—Luz Casal	Safe
Isaias & Maria (with Laura Narjes)	37 (9, 9, 10, 9)	Viennese Waltz	"Under The Sky of Paris"—André Rieu	Safe
Isaias & Maria (with Laura Narjes)	38 (9, 10, 10, 9)	Mambo	"Maria"—Ricky Martin	Safe
Katerina & Elias (with Evagelia Aravani)	36 (9, 9, 9, 9)	Quickstep	"Part-Time Lover"—The Lost Fingers	Bottom two
Katerina & Elias (with Evagelia Aravani)	40 (10, 10, 10, 10)	Samba	"Rich Girl"—Gwen Stefani feat. Eve	Bottom two

=== Week 14: Semi-finals (Solo dance) ===
Running order

Couple	Score	Dance	Music	Result
Isaias & Maria	37 (9, 9, 9, 10)	Foxtrot	"Supreme"—Robbie Williams	Safe
Isaias & Maria	40 (10, 10, 10, 10)	Solo	"Guilt"—Nero	Safe
Klelia & Paulos	38 (10, 9, 9, 10)	Paso Doble	"Best of You"—Foo Fighters	Eliminated; Third place
Klelia & Paulos	37 (9, 10, 9, 9)	Solo	"Feeling Good"—Muse	Eliminated; Third place
Katerina & Elias	39 (9, 10, 10, 10)	Paso Doble	"He Is a Pirate/The Black Pearl"—Klaus Badelt & Hans Zimmer	Bottom two
Katerina & Elias	38 (10, 9, 9, 10)	Solo	"Remenea" and "Do it"—Seo Fernandez and Claydee & Ruby	Bottom two

=== Week 15: Finals ===
Running order

Couple	Score	Dance	Music	Result
Katerina & Elias	40 (10, 10, 10, 10)	Viennese Waltz	"Iris"—Goo Goo Dolls	Runner-up
Katerina & Elias	36 (9, 9, 9, 9)	Rumba	"Feelings"—Shirley Bassey	Runner-up
Katerina & Elias	40 (10, 10, 10, 10)	Dance-off	"300 theme"	Runner-up
Isaias & Maria	40 (10, 10, 10, 10)	Viennese Waltz	"Under The Sky of Paris"—André Rieu	Winner
Isaias & Maria	40 (10, 10, 10, 10)	Jive	"Rock & Roll Queen"—The Subways	Winner
Isaias & Maria	40 (10, 10, 10, 10)	Dance-off	"300 theme"	Winner

== Dance chart ==
- Week 1: Cha-cha-cha for women and Tango for men.
- Week 2: Viennese Waltz for women and Jive for men.
- Week 3: Samba for women and Paso Doble for men.
- Week 4: Freestyle (Greek night)
- Week 5: Rumba for women and Bachata for men.
- Week 6: Argentine tango for women and Mambo for men.
- Week 7: Freestyle (Favorite song)
- Week 8: Dance fusion
- Week 9: Freestyle & Christmas Rock n Roll Marathon (Christmas show)
- Week 10: Salsa for women and Quickstep for men & Team dances
- Week 11: Freestyle & 24-hour challenge
- Week 12: Foxtrot & Cha-Cha-Cha (solo) for women and Cha-Cha-Cha & Jive (solo) for men
- Week 13: Quickstep for women and Waltz for men & Trio Challenge
- Week 14: Paso Doble for women and Foxtrot for men & Solo Dance Challenge
- Week 15: Favorite ballroom, redemption Latin & a face-off dance

Couple	Week 1	Week 2	Week 3	Week 4	Week 5	Week 6	Week 7	Week 8	Week 9		Week 10		Week 11		Week 12		Week 13		Week 14		Week 15		
Isaias & Maria	Tango	Jive	Paso Doble	Freestyle	Bachata	Mambo	Freestyle	Waltz; Jive	Freestyle	Christmas; Rock n Roll; Marathon	Quickstep	Paso Doble; Classico	Freestyle	Paso Doble	Cha-Cha-Cha	Jive	Viennese Waltz	Mambo	Foxtrot	Solo	Viennese; Waltz	Jive	Dance-off
Katerina & Elias	Cha-Cha-Cha	Viennese; Waltz	Samba	Freestyle	Rumba	Argentine; Tango	Freestyle	Jive; Rumba	Freestyle	Christmas; Rock n Roll; Marathon	Salsa	Paso Doble; Metallico	Freestyle	Viennese; Waltz	Foxtrot	Cha-Cha-Cha	Quickstep	Samba	Paso Doble	Solo	Viennese; Waltz	Rumba	Dance-off
Klelia & Paulos	Cha-Cha-Cha	Viennese; Waltz	Samba	Freestyle	Rumba	Argentine; Tango	Freestyle	Paso Doble; Cha-Cha-Cha	Freestyle	Christmas; Rock n Roll; Marathon	Salsa	Paso Doble; Classico	Freestyle	-	Foxtrot	Cha-Cha-Cha	Quickstep	Argentine; Tango	Paso Doble	Solo	Freestyle		
Mary & Yuri	Cha-Cha-Cha	Viennese; Waltz	Samba	Freestyle	Rumba	Argentine; Tango	Freestyle	Bachata; Waltz	Freestyle	Christmas; Rock n Roll; Marathon	Salsa	Paso Doble; Classico	Freestyle	Samba	Foxtrot	Cha-Cha-Cha	Quickstep	Samba			Freestyle		
Lakis & Anastasia	Tango	Jive	Paso Doble	Freestyle	Bachata	Mambo	Freestyle	Foxtrot; Mambo	Freestyle	Christmas; Rock n Roll; Marathon	Quickstep	Paso Doble; Metallico	Freestyle	Bachata	Cha-Cha-Cha	Jive					Paso Doble		
Michalis & Anna	Tango	Jive	Paso Doble	Freestyle	Bachata	Mambo	Freestyle	Quickstep; Bachata	Freestyle	Christmas; Rock n Roll; Marathon	Quickstep	Paso Doble; Metallico	Freestyle	Tango							Freestyle		
Evagelia & Vladimir	Cha-Cha-Cha	Viennese; Waltz	Samba	Freestyle	Rumba	Argentine; Tango	Freestyle	Quickstep; Samba	Freestyle	Christmas; Rock n Roll; Marathon											Viennese Waltz		
Alex & Claudia-Anna	Tango	Jive	Paso Doble	Freestyle	Bachata	Mambo	Freestyle	Rumba; Paso Doble													Paso Doble		
Chrispa & Vaggelis	Cha-Cha-Cha	Viennese; Waltz	Samba	Freestyle	Rumba	Argentine; Tango	Freestyle														Rumba		
Thanos & Fotini	Tango	Jive	Paso Doble	Freestyle	Bachata	Mambo															Bachata		
Gogo & Thodoris	Cha-Cha-Cha	Viennese; Waltz	Samba	Freestyle	Rumba																Bachata		
Eleni & Giorgos	Cha-Cha-Cha	Viennese; Waltz	Samba	Freestyle																	Cha-Cha-Cha		
Sakis & Nikoletta	Tango	Jive	Paso Doble																		Tango		
Konstantina & Dionisis	Cha-Cha-Cha	Viennese; Waltz																					

Highest scoring dance
Lowest scoring dance
Danced, but not scored
Gained bonus points for this dance
Highest score of the week and won immunity for next week

== Guest performances ==
Date	Dance style	Artist(s)/Group(s)	Song(s)^{a}	Dancers/Guests
October 27, 2013	Hoop Diving	"Cirque du Soleil"	Instrumental	Cirque du Soleil dancers/performers
December 8, 2013	Paso Doble	Nadia Boule	"Klepse me"	Fotini Papastavrou, Nikoletta Mauridi, Tzeni Nikolentzou; Giorgos Ketseridis, Giannis Tserkinis & Alexandros Papadopoulos
December 15, 2013	Broadway	"Annie musical"	"Tomorrow"/"Hard Knock Life" "Easy Street"/"N.Y.C."^{b}	Ioanna Pilichou, Argiris Aggelou & Musical's actors
December 22, 2013	Viennese Waltz	Paidiki chorodia Spirou Lamprou	"Trigona Kalanta" "It's the Most Wonderful Time of the Year"	All pros of the show
December 22, 2013	Freestyle	Bryn Christopher	"The Quest"	Andreas Georgiou & Eleni Vaitsou
December 29, 2013	Rumba	Željko Joksimović	"Lane moje"	Nikoletta Karra & Alex Pacavier
January 5, 2014	Argentine Tango	"Tango Seduccion"	"Inspiración"	Chloe Theodoropoulou & Dionisis Theodoropoulos
January 5, 2014	Tap Dancing	"Sugar musical"	"Tear the Town Apart"^{c}	Lefteris Eleutheriou, Christos Spanos, Iasonas Mandilas & Aris Plaskasovitis
January 12, 2014	Argentine Tango	Orquesta Tipica	"Ojos Negros"	Eleonora Meleti & Carlos Danasta
January 12, 2014	Mambo; Disco	Gloria Estefan; Bee Gees	"Conga" "You Should Be Dancing"	Tonis Sfinos, Claudia-Anna Stoyia & Nikoletta Mauridi
January 19, 2014	Hip Hop	Justin Timberlake	"My Love"	Thodoris Marantinis & Anna Polyzou
January 19, 2014	Paso Doble	Elias Vrettos	"Ax Kardia Mou"	Elias Vrettos & Claudia-Anna Stoyia
January 19, 2014	Flamenco	Vasco Hernandez	"Alraso"	Vicky Hajivasiliou & Flamenco dances
January 26, 2014	Rumba	Katy Garbi	"Anemodarmena Ipsi"	Katy Garbi & Thodoris Panagakos
January 26, 2014	Freestyle	—	"Tomb Raider theme"	Doretta Papadimitriou with Manos Papanas, Giannis Sousouris; Tzeni Nikolentzou & Antonis Skrivanos
January 26, 2014	Freestyle	Rihanna	"Te Amo"	Katerina Geronikolou & Vaggelis Holevas
February 2, 2014	Freestyle	"Troikos Polemos" (play)	Instrumental	Doukissa Nomikou, Doretta Papadimitriou & Play's dancers

Notes
a. The songs were playback
b. All songs were in the Greek versions of the Musical
c. The song was in the Greek version of the Musical

== Ratings ==
Show	Episode	Air date	Official ratings (in millions)	Weekly rank	Rating/share (adults 15–44)	Rating/share (household)	Source
1	Week 1	October 20, 2013	1.598	2	37.1%	37.7%	
2	Week 2	October 27, 2013	1.130	15	33.6%	34.3%	
3	Week 3	November 3, 2013	1.237	8	29%	32.3%	
4	Week 4: Greek night	November 17, 2013	1.396	9	33.3%	36.4%	
5	Week 5	November 24, 2013	1.381	8	28.1%	32.6%	
6	Week 6	December 1, 2013	1.471	6	26.7%	31.5%	
7	Week 7: Favorite song	December 8, 2013	1.448	6	31.9%	36.4%	
8	Week 8: Dance Fusion	December 15, 2013	1.422	6	31.3%	34.5%	
9	Week 9: Christmas show	December 22, 2013	1.475	6	29.3%	36.6%	
10	Week 10: Team Dances	December 29, 2013	1.348	1	28.3%	31.8%	
11	Week 11: 24-hour challenge	January 5, 2014	1.349	4	30.3%	33.3%	
12	Week 12: Solo challenge	January 12, 2014	1.465	7	35.3%	31.8%	
13	Week 13: Trio challenge	January 19, 2014	1.711	6	33.4%	40.1%	
14	Week 14: Semi-finals	January 26, 2014	1.698	5	33.5%	38.3%	
15	Week 15: Finals	February 2, 2014	1.882	2	42.6%	44.6%	
Averages			1.467	6	32.25%	35.48%	
