= To Megalo Pazari =

Greek game show

To megalo pazari (Grand Bazaar) is a Greek adaptation of the hit U.S. game show Let's Make a Deal. Originally, it ran on Mega from 1992 to 1993. Thirteen years later, by it was revived as To pio Megalo Pazari (The even Greater Bazaar) running on Alpha TV from 2006 to 2007. Both versions were hosted by Andreas Mikroutsikos.

Ten years later, the show was repackaged as Kane Pazari (Make a Bargain) hosted by Doretta Papadimitriou and aired on Skai in 2017 for a single season.
