= Evangelia Aravani =

Greek fashion model and TV presenter (born 1985)

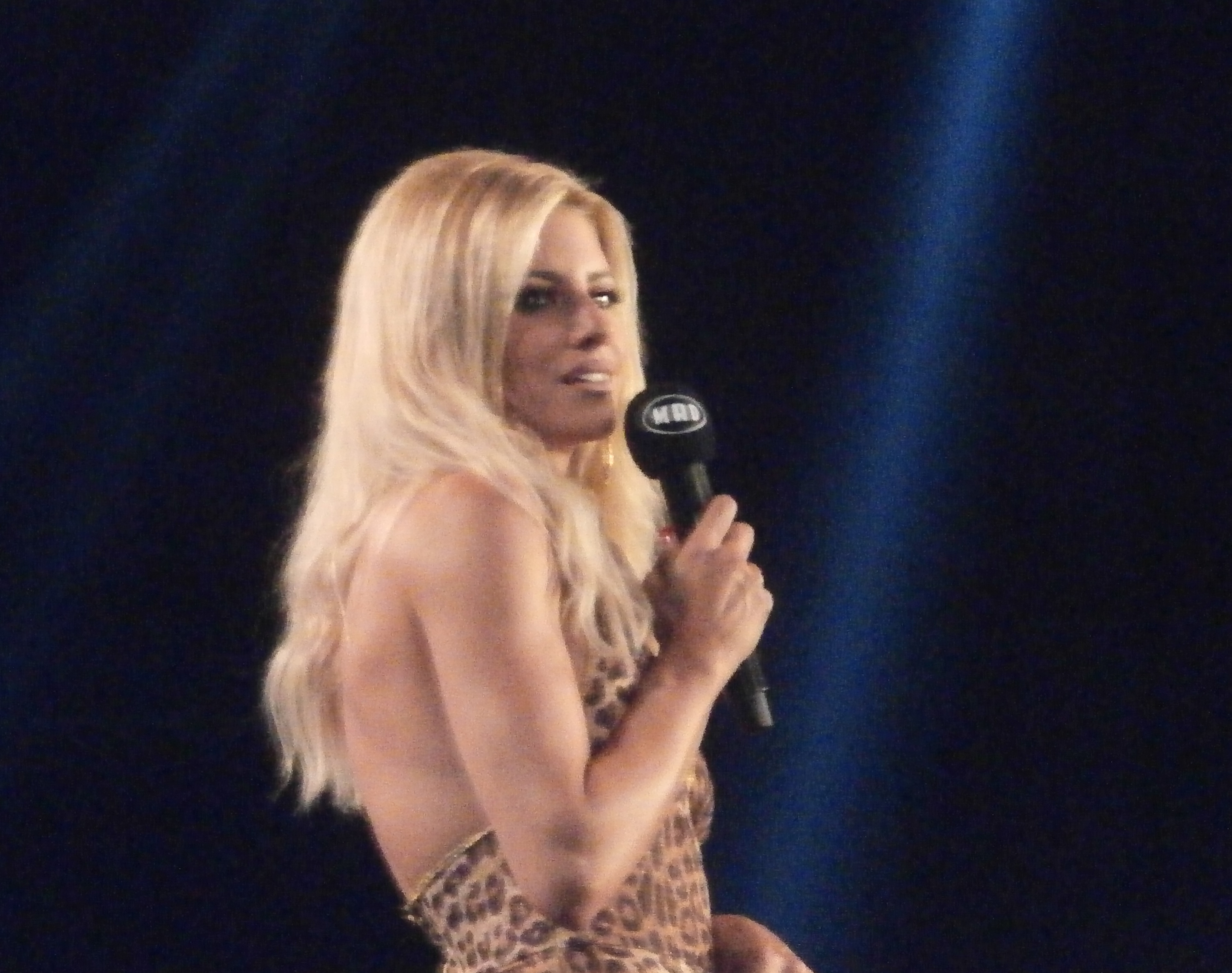
- Aravani in 2017
- Born: Evangelia Aravani; 29 November 1985 (age 40); Lefkada, Greece
- Height: 176 cm (5 ft 9 in)
- Beauty pageant titleholder
- Hair color: Blond
- Eye color: Green

Evangelia Aravani (Greek: Ευαγγελία Αραβανή: born 29 November 1985) is a Greek fashion model, television presenter and beauty pageant titleholder. In 2005 Aravani won the title of Miss Star Hellas and then was chosen to represent Greece at the Miss Universe 2005 pageant where she placed 11th.

Aravani was a special guest at the official Cypriot beauty contest, whose winners go on to represent Cyprus at the Miss Universe and Miss World pageants. She co-presented alongside singer Sakis Rouvas the fourth and fifth seasons of singing reality television competition X-Factor in Greece and continued her career by presenting the fashion competition My Style Rocks and the non-profit dancing competition Dancing with the Stars. From 2018 to 2019, she presented the Greek version Project Runway.

== Filmography ==
=== Television ===
Year	Title	Role(s)	Notes	Ref.
2005	National Annual Beauty Pageant of Greece	Herself (contestant)	Star Hellas '05	
2005	Miss Universe 2005	Herself (contestant)	E! TV special; 11th place	
2007-2008	Beautiful World in the Morning	Herself (co-host)	Daytime morning show on MEGA; season 5	
2008	TaSpy TV	Herself (host)	Weekend talk show on Alpha TV	
2012	In a really good mood	Herself (co-host)	Weekend morning talk show on Alpha TV; season 5	
2012-2013	GreekClips	Herself (host)	Music talk show	
2013-2014	Dancing with the Stars	Herself (contestant)	10 episodes; season 4	
2014	Golden Barista	Herself (host)	Season 1	
2014-2015	The Alfa Chef	Herself (host)	Daytime cooking reality show	
2016-2017	The X-Factor Greece	Herself (co-host)	Season 4-5	
2017	My Style Rocks	Herself (host)	Daytime fashion reality show; season 1	
2017	Greece's Got Talent	Herself (guest judge)	Episode: "Judge Cut 6"; season 5	
2018	Dancing with the Stars	Herself (host)	Season 6	
2018-2019	Project Runway Greece	Herself (host)	Season 1	
2019	MadWalk - The Fashion Music Project	Herself (performance)	TV special	

=== Music videos ===
Year	Title	Artist	Ref.
2005	"You make me remember something from Greece"	Thanos Petrelis	
2011	"Who's gonna be compared with you?"	Thanos Petrelis	
