= Doretta Papadimitriou =

Greek actress and presenter

- Ντορέττα Παπαδημητρίου
- Born: Theodora Papadimitriou; 15 October 1979 (age 47); Athens, Greece
- Education: National and Kapodistrian University of Athens
- Occupations: Actress; presenterl
- Years active: early 2000s-present
- Known for: Dancing with the Stars (Greek season 3), Alter Ego (2007 film), To Megalo Pazari, Survivor Greece
- Spouse: Konstantinos Piladakis (2004-2009)
- Children: 2

Doretta Papadimitriou (born Theodora Papadimitriou 15 October 1979) is a Greek actress, television host and former athlete. After her acting debut on the MEGA daytime soap opera Forbidden Love (2001-2002) and her film debut on successful Nikos Perrakis' comedy Liza and all the others (2003), she purched a career on television with series such as Almost Never (2003), Close your eyes (2004), Wedding ring on the right (2005), Confusions (2005) and others on leading roles. She has also appeared in the films Alter Ego (2007), Nisos (2009), 180° (2010), Dos (2011) and others.

In 2013, after her win on the third season of the Greek version of Dancing with the Stars on ANT1, she started her career as television hostess debuted on the Sunday Skai TV talk show Κnock on wood. She also hosted tv show as The Music School (2014), Greece I Love You (2015) while in 2015 she signed as the hostess of the MEGA daytime morning talk show Very sweet good morning with Doretta Papadimitriou.

== Early life ==
Papadimitriou was born in Athens on 15 October 1979, where she spent her childhood years. After finishing school she started studying at the department of political science and public administration of the school of economics and political sciences of the National and Kapodistrian University of Athens. Along with her studies at university, she also studied acting at the Iasmos Drama School of Vasilis Diamantopoulos. During her teenage years until the age of 22, she was a champion in rhythmic gymnastics and athletics. During her sporting career, she represented the national team until 2002, participating in the European Championships, while she was named Balkan Champion with the Junior team in 1992.

== Career ==
=== Television actress ===
Papadimitriou made her television debut as an actress in the early 2000s in Mega Channel's daily series Forbidden Love, playing a small role. In April 2003, she appeared in an episode of the ANT1 comedy series Lefkos Oikos, playing a saleswoman. Her first starring television role came in the 2003–2004 season in the NET comedy series Shedon Pote, directed by Nikos Perakis. There she played Vanda Pappa, a young up-and-coming actress, co-starring with Anna-Maria Papacharalambous, Vana Rabota and Annita Koulis in the first cycle of the series. Alongside Almost Never, from March to May 2004 he had a key role in the cast of the third cycle of Christoforos Papakaliatis's drama series Close Your Eyes.

Papadimitriou returned to television in the 2005–2006 season with a double appearance. On the one hand, she joined the lead cast of the second cycle of the daily series of Elena Akrita and Giorgos Kyritsis Vera sto Dexi on Mega Channel, having the role of Anna Damianou, while on the other hand she starred with Thanasis Efthimiadis in the comedy series of Alpha TV Confusions. This was followed by the episode "To Lamogio Keratas" of the series Honorable Cuckolds where she starred together with Alexis Georgoulis. In 2007, she starred with Nikos Galanos in the episode "Question of Life and Death" of the police series The Stories of Police Officer Beka . In 2008, she starred in stories of the series of self-contained episodes I Saw You and True Loves. In 2009 she had a key role in the youth series Wild Children playing Danae, a lawyer. In the same year, he made a guest appearance in the first episode of the series Talk Dirty to Me. In 2010, she again played a lawyer in four episodes of the second cycle of the series Lakis o glukoulis, while she also appeared as a guest in the comedy series Mr. & Mrs. Pels.

In October 2012, it was announced that she was one of the participants in the third cycle of ΑΝΤ1's show Dancing with the Stars. There she competed with professional partner Pavlos Manogiannakis and on 17 February 2013, she was declared the winner of the season. After several seasons of presenting TV shows, she announced in December 2018 that she is going to star in Alpha TV's black comedy Are you keeping a secret?. There she played Angeliki Asteriou, a flight attendant who has an extramarital affair, co-starring with, among others, Elisavet Konstantinidou, Meleti Ilias, Traiana Anania and Konstantinos Aspiotis. In 2022, she participated in an episode of Alpha's neoclassical series. In 2023-2024 she works in On the Wires on ERT1.

=== Television presenter ===
After the end of Dancing with the Stars, she took over the presentation of Skai's infotainment show Xtypa Xylos from September to December 2013, which was about children and the prevention of child accidents. At the same time, from September of the same year until February 2014, she was the backstage presenter of the fourth cycle of Dancing with the Stars, with Doukissa Nomikou as the main presenter.

In July 2014 she signed a contract with Mega channel. From September to December 2014 she was the presenter of the musical talent show for children The Music School. After it ended she presented the 2015 Eurovision final for NERIT along Mary Synatsakis. In March 2015, she presented Mega Channel's game show Greece S'Agapo in the station's prime time zone. In July 2015, Mega Channel announced that would be the presenter of the station's morning entertainment zone in the 2015–2016 season. So from September 2015 she started presenting the daily show Kalimeroudias.

On 27 April 2016, shortly before the end of the show, she announced that "Kalimeroudia" was temporarily suspended due to the financial problems faced by the television station Mega Channel. The show never aired again, as did the rest of the station's schedule. In January 2017, she signed a cooperation contract with Skai. There, from February of the same year, she started presenting a game show based on the American show Let's make a deal.

Then she presented the entertainment show Here in 2017-2018 together with Dimitris Milioglou and Konstantinos Vassalos. At the same time, from January 2018, she presented Here Survivor, which was soon renamed Survivor Panorama and presented exclusive material, interviews and backstage from Survivor Greece. In the summer of 2018, it was announced the end of her collaboration with the station. That year she also appeared as a guest judge on Dancing with the Stars 6, and made an appearance on MadWalk - The Fashion Music Project. In 2020-2021 she presented the show Roomies with Katerina Zarifi and Maria Solomou on Mega. In 2021 she presented the cooking reality show Game of Chefs on ANT1.

=== Theatre ===
Papadimitriou's first well-known work in the ttheatretook place in the 2009–10 season, with the show The Black Box staged at the Jeni Karezi Theatre. At the same time, in 2010, she also participated in The 24 hour plays at the Kappa Theatre. In the winter of 2010–2011, she played in the play Sheer Madness, at the Warehouse Theatre.

This was followed by the performances Women on the Verge of a Nervous Breakdown by Yiannis Kakleas (2011–2012, Mikro Pallas Theatre), Master Puntila and his servant Matti (2012–2013, Jenny Karezi Theatre), The Hangover 4 and Trojan War (2013–2014), Ghost in Heels by Stamatis Fassoulis (2014–2015, Gloria Theatre), Chet Walker's Sweet Charity (2015–2016, Badminton Theatre), Nikos Moutsinas' Above (2016–2017, Piraeus 131 Theatre), Marihuana Stop in adaptation /directed by Giorgos Valaris (2018–2019, Gazi Live Theater), Hair Spray! (2019–2020, Acropolis Theatre), Mamma Mia (2022, City Garden Festival).

=== Movies ===
In the cinema, she has participated in a total of seven films. Her first appearance was in Nikos Perakis' comedy "Lisa and everyone else" in 2003, where she had a leading role. There she played the close friend of the protagonist, Claire, with the film selling 70,000 tickets nationwide and coming first among 20 films. Her next appearance on the big screen was in 2007 in Nikolas Dimitropoulos' film "Alter ego" where she starred alongside Sakis Rouvas. In 2009, she took part in the comedy "Nisos", directed by Christos Dimas, playing a lawyer. In 2010, she collaborated again with Nikolas Dimitropoulos in the comedy "180 degrees". This was followed by the fantasy film 'Dos' in 2011.

In 2013, she gave her voice to the Greek version of the animated film The Smurfs 2 in the role of Vexi. In 2016, she participated in the Greek-American adventure "Short Fuse", playing Athena.

== Filmography ==
=== Film ===
Year	Title	Role	Notes	Ref.
2003	Liza and all the others	Claire	Film debut	
2007	Alter Ego	Nefele		
2009	Island	Irene Theodoraki		
2010	180°	lawyer		
2011	Dos	Erato		
2013	The Smurfs 2	Vexy	Voice role	
2016	Short fuse	Athena		
2026	Best Friends Forever			

=== Television ===
Year	Title	Role	Notes
2000-2001	Forbidden Love	Katerina	Series regular; season 3
2003	White House	Niki	1 episode
2003-2004	Almost Never	Vanta Pappa	Main role, 20 episode
2004	Close your eyes	Elli	Main role, 6 episodes
2005-2006	Wedding ring on the right	Anna Damianou	Main role, 206 episodes
2005-2006	Confusions	Annita Gkrekou	Main role, 24 episodes
2006	Honorable Cuckolds	Mariada Zafeiriou	Episode: "The lamoyo cuckold"
2007	Τhe stories of detective Bekas	Olga Karra	Episode: "Matter of life and death"
2008	I saw you	Anna	Episode: "Hedgehog"
2008	True Loves	Mary	Episode: "Thank you"
2009	Wild boys	Danae	4 episodes
2009	Talk dirty to me	Chrysa	1 episode
2010	Lakis the sweetie	Phaedra	4 episodes
2010	Mr. and Mrs. Pels	Alex Dimitriou	2 episodes
2012-2013	Dancing with the Stars	Herself (contestant)	Season 3; Winner
2013	Κnock on wood	Herself (host)	Sunday talk show
2013-2014	Dancing with the Stars	Herself (co-host)	Season 4
2014-2015	The Music School	Herself (host)	Talent show
2015	Greek Eurovision Final	Herself (host)	TV special
2015	Greece I Love You	Herself (host)	Game show
2015-2016	Very sweet good morning	Herself (host)	Daytime morning talk show
2016	MadWalk - The Fashion Music Project	Herself (performance)	TV special
2017	Let's Make a Deal	Herself (host)	Daytime game show; season 7
2017	My Style Rocks	Herself (guest judge)	Gala 5; season 1
2017	Greece's Got Talent	Herself (guest judge)	Episode: "Judge Cut 3"; season 5
2017-2018	Here	Herself (host)	Daytime talk show
2017-2018	Time Out Eating Awards	Herself (host)	TV special
2018	Here Survivor / Survivor Panorama	Herself (host)	Daytime talk show
2018	Dancing with the Stars	Herself (guest judge)	Live 12; season 6
2018	MadWalk - The Fashion Music Project	Herself (performance)	TV special
2019-2020	Are you keeping a secret?	Angeliki Asteriou	Main role, 18 episodes
2020-2021	Roomies	Herself (host)	Weekend talk show; also creator
2021	Game of Chefs	Herself (host)	Reality cooking show
2021	Greece's Next Top Model	Herself (guest)	Episode: "Dynasty"; season 6
2022	The Neoclassics	Popi Makrykosta	Episode: "Neither cat nor damage"
2023-2024	In prison	Vanesa Ioannou	Main role, 25 episodes
2025	Mothers	Herself (host)	Episode: "Mothers with Doretta Papadimitriou"
2025	Very awful ideas	TV reporter	1 episode

=== Music videos ===
Year	Title	Artist	Ref.
1996	"Bang and Down"	Lambis Livieratos	
2013	"Paradise"	Kostas Martakis & DJ Kas	
2015	"I & You"	Isaias Matiaba	
2022	"Inside the heart"	Walkman the Band	

== Personal life ==
From 2004 to 2009 she was married to Greek entrepreneur Konstantinos Piladakis, with whom she had two sons.
