= Stelios Kerasidis =

- Born: 28 June 2012 (age 14); Athens, Greece
- Genre: Classical music
- Occupation: Musician
- Instrument: Piano
- Years active: 2018–present
- Website: https://stelioskerasidis.com/

Stelios Kerasidis (Athens, 28 June 2012) is a Greek young pianist and composer, who is widely recognized as a global musical prodigy.

== Biography ==
Kerasidis was born in Nea Makri, a suburb of Athens. He is presently growing up there. Notably, he started composing his melodies at the age of four.

He received a first recognition in October 2018 after his participation in the Greek talent show "Greece's Got Talent" and has later achieved international acclaim for his musical performances.

In 2018, at the age of six, Kerasidis became the youngest Greek musician ever to perform at the Carnegie Hall in New York City. A few months later, he gave a piano recital at London's Royal Albert Hall.

During the quarantine period, one of his compositions, the "Isolation Waltz" gained international recognition when it was featured on the BBC World news broadcast.

In 2022, Kerasidis was included in the list of the top 100 talents globally. In 2023 Stelios won the 1st and the "Young" talent prize at the prestigious global Competition: “De Bach au jazz”.
