= Proto Thema =

Greek newspaper

- Type: weekly newspaper
- Format: Broadsheet
- Owner: Proto Thema Publishing A.E
- Founder: Themos Anastasiadis
- Publisher: Tassos Karamitsos
- Staff writers: 500-600
- Founded: 2005
- Political alignment: Conservative Liberalism, Pro-New Democracy
- Language: Greek
- City: Athens
- Country: Greece
- Circulation: 400,000 (2007)

Proto Thema (Greek: Πρώτο Θέμα, pronounced [ˈproto ˈθema] English: Lead Story) is a Greek newspaper, published every Sunday. It was founded in 2005 by Themos Anastasiadis, Makis Triantafyllopoulos, and Tassos Karamitsos. It has also English version website.

In late December 2005, the newspaper broke the story of an alleged coverup by the Greek government of torture of Pakistani terrorist suspects.

The newspaper has been widely criticised of being closely affiliated and/or even getting funded through third-party sources with the New Democracy political party and supporting the Greece's Prime Minister Kyriakos Mitsotakis.

The newspaper reportedly harassed Ingeborg Beugel, a Dutch journalist, by releasing her address to the public.

In 2008 Makis Triantafylopoulos, after a disagreement with Themos Anastasiades over the case of the suicide attempt of Christos Zahopoulos, left the newspaper and it was published by Themos Anastasiades until his death on 22 January 2019. After the death of Themos Anastasiadis the newspaper was taken over by Tassos Karamitsos, who is its new publisher.
