= Themos Anastasiadis =

Greek newspaper publisher (1958–2019)

- Born: 6 January 1958; Athens, Greece
- Died: 22 January 2019 (aged 61); Zurich, Switzerland
- Occupation: Newspaper publisher
- Board member of: Proto Thema A.E.
- Spouse: Vasiliki Panagiotopoulou
- Children: 3

Themos Anastasiadis (Greek: Θεμιστοκλής (Θέμος) Αναστασιάδης; 6 January 1958 – 22 January 2019) was a Greek newspaper publisher, and the founder and owner of Greece's largest selling newspaper Proto Thema, as well as the CEO of Proto Thema A.E.

== Early life ==
He was born on January 6, 1958, in Athens, originally from Koukouli, Ioannina, in Zagori. His father, Byron Anastasiadis, was a board member of the oil multinational Royal Dutch Shell, and the family was often forced to move to various cities in Greece and abroad.

At the age of 16, in the then fifth grade of the Gymnasium (today B 'Lyceum), he consciously pioneered, organized underground, and methodically initiated the group protest of his classmates for the rejection of the Greek military junta of the Polytechnic uprising in 1973. As a result, he was expelled in order to be imprisoned.

== Career ==
=== Print journalism ===
Anastasiadis started journalism as a student, from the motorcycle magazine "MotoGP". Then, starting from the humorous column "Black Hole" in Eleftherotypia, he worked as a political-economic editor in the newspapers To Vima, Express, Eleftherotypia, and Kathimerini. For a short time, he worked at ERT, while he was one of the first to staff the radio station Athens 9.84 of the Municipality of Athens. In 1991, at the age of just 33 years old, he became the youngest editor-in-chief of the legendary Kathimerini newspaper. This was the highest position to ever be held by such a young person in the history of Greek journalism.

In 1995, along with Petros Kostopoulos he founded the popular lifestyle magazine Nitro.

In 1998, he founded the sports newspaper Protathlitis (Champion); a newspaper that supports Olympiacos, a team which he supported.

In 2000, he founded the financial newspaper Metoxos.

In 2005, he created a Sunday newspaper called Proto Thema.

Anastasiadis media group Proto Thema A.E owns one of Greece's most popular radio stations Thema Radio and publishes several magazines such as Car Greece, Marie Claire Greece, Gala Greece, and Olive Greece.

Anastasiadis was one of the most influential Greek publishers in the history of Greek journalism and one of the most powerful men in Greece. Despite his wealth and social recognition, his publications always supported progressive causes.

=== Television ===
Apart from his work in print journalism, Anastasiadis had worked also on television. From 2001 to February 2006 he was the host of "Ola", a weekly humor show on Alpha TV. On this show, he used to invite various personalities from Greek showbiz and highlight the many funny moments from Greek television.

In March 2006, Anastasiadis became the host of the show "OlaXXL" on ANT1 television. As of 2008, the show continues with a different name each year but contains the word "Ola". His TV show became the most popular TV show in all of Greece for many years.

== Personal life ==
He married Vasiliki Panagiotopoulou and had three children.

In 2014, he decided to move his family from Athens to Zurich after his political fights with Prime Minister Alexis Tsipras and many previous governments in order to protect his family. His numerous scandals and political power required him to be accompanied by bodyguards and bulletproof cars daily in order to ensure his safety in Athens.

He died on 22 January 2019 in Zurich after fighting with cancer for 1.5 years.

== Involvement with justice ==
In January 2009, he was sentenced to 19 months in prison with a suspended sentence for exchanging Christos Zahopoulos's sex tape as well for publishing photos in "Thema" that presented Christos Zahopoulos in private moments. Finally, in April 2013, the three-member Court of Appeal unanimously acquitted Anastasiadis and the others involved for breach of personal data, judging that the DVD was never processed and classified by him.

On December 4, 2012, criminal prosecution was brought against him for tax evasion and money laundering in the amount of 5.5 million euros. Anastasiadis argued that the SYRIZA government had targeted him and the decision to fine him was political.
