= Dancing with the Stars (Greek TV series) season 3 =

Dancing with the Stars
- Season 3
- Celebrity winner: Ntoretta Papadimitriou
- Professional winner: Paulos Manogiannakis
- No. of episodes: 14

Release
- Original network: ANT1
- Original release: 18 November 2012 – 17 February 2013

Season chronology
- ← Previous; Season 2 Next → Season 4

Dancing with the Stars is a Greek reality show airing on ANT1 and filming live in Athens. The show is based on the United Kingdom BBC Television series Strictly Come Dancing and is part of BBC Worldwide's Dancing with the Stars franchise. The theme song was "It's personal" performed by Swedish indie pop band The Radio Dept.

The third season of the show started on 18 November 2012. The judges were five, with Katia Dandoulaki joining the judging panel, replacing Errika Prezarakou and Galena Velikova returning on the judging panel.

== Judges ==
- Alexis Kostalas, announcer, sports commentator
- Galena Velikova, choreographer, dancer, dance teacher
- Katia Dandoulaki, actress
- Giannis Latsios, ANT1 television program manager
- Fokas Evagelinos, choreographer, dancer, dance teacher

== Couples ==
Celebrity	Occupation	Professional partner	Status
Nikoleta Ralli	TV presenter	Yuri Dimitrov	Eliminated 1st on 25 November 2012
Marianta Pieridi	Singer	Dionisis Valmis	Eliminated 2nd on 2 December 2012
Vana Mparmpa	Actress	Thodoris Panagakos	Eliminated 3rd on 9 December 2012
Giannis Aivazis	Actor	Eutuxia Marketaki	Eliminated 4th on 17 December 2012
Kostas Krommidas	Actor	Anna Polyzou	Eliminated 5th on 22 December 2012
Giorgos Tsalikis	Singer	Emily Matthaiakaki	Eliminated 6th on 30 December 2012
Vasia Trifylli	Actress	Dimitris Fokas	Eliminated 7th on 6 January 2013
Kelly Kellekidou	Singer	Vaggelis Holevas	Eliminated 8th on 13 January 2013
Elena Papavasileiou	TV presenter, journalist	Elias Boutsis	Eliminated 9th on 20 January 2013
Spyros Soulis	Architect, TV presenter	Maria Antimisari	Eliminated 10th on 27 January 2013
Nikos Anadiotis	Actor, Former Model	Anastasia Draka	Eliminated 11th on 4 February 2013
Laura Narjes	TV presenter	Giannis Tserkinis	Third place on 10 February 2013
Elias Vrettos	Singer	Claudia-Anna Stoyia	Runner-up on 17 February 2013
Ntoretta Papadimitriou	Actress	Paulos Manogiannakis	Winner on 17 February 2013

== Scoring chart ==
Couple	Place	1	2	1+2	3	4	5	6	7	8	9	10	11	12	13	14
Ntoretta & Paulos	1	34	31	65	34	35	40	42	44	46	46	48+9=57	46+50=96	45+50=95	49+50=99	50+50+48=148
Elias & Claudia-Anna	2	35	30	65	34	31	36	40	45	42	45	48+10=58	46+47=93	45+45=90	43+47=90	45+50+50=145
Laura & Giannis	3	28	23	51	28	35	38	36	37	41	40	42+7=49	40+43=83	40+45=85	40+39=79	
Nikos & Anastasia	4	29	23	52	27	27	33	38	36	40	45	41+6=47	39+41=80	42+42=84		
Spyros & Maria	5	31	27	58	34	33	34	35	40	40	43	44+8=52	39+40=79			
Elena & Elias	6	32	25	57	33	30	36	34	37	42	44	45+5=50				
Kelly & Vaggelis	7	30	25	55	33	31	35	35	40	42	40					
Vasia & Dimitris	8	32	22	54	26	26	–	29	31	35						
Giorgos & Emily	9	30	29	59	30	30	32	37	39							
Kostas & Anna	10	34	26	60	26	33	38	35								
Giannis & Eutuxia	11	25	22	47	25	25	30									
Vana & Thodoris	12	31	24	55	30	21										
Marianta & Dionisis	13	29	24	53	25											
Nikoleta & Uri	14	30	23	53												

Red numbers indicate the lowest score for each week.
Green numbers indicate the highest score for each week.
indicates the couple eliminated that week.
indicates the returning couple that finished in the bottom two.
indicates the winning couple.
indicates the runner-up couple.
indicates the third-place couple.
indicates the couple didn't dance this week.

- In episode 5 Vasia & Dimitris didn't dance due to Vasia's illness.
- In episode 6 Vasia & Dimitris deducted two points on the scoring chart because they didn't dance on the previous show.

=== Averages ===
This table only counts for dances scored on a traditional 50-points scale. The Dance Boogie Marathon points are not counted.

Rank	Place	Couple	Total points	Dances	Average
1	1	Ntoretta & Paulos	838	19	44.1
2	2	Elias & Claudia-Anna	804	19	42.3
3	3	Laura & Giannis	595	16	37.2
4	5	Spyros & Maria	440	12	36.7
5	6	Elena & Elias	358	10	35.8
6	4	Nikos & Anastasia	503	14	35.7
7	7	Kelly & Vaggelis	311	9	34.6
8	9	Giorgos & Emily	227	7	32.4
9	10	Kostas & Anna	192	6	32.0
10	8	Vasia & Dimitris	203	7	29.0
11	12	Vana & Thodoris	106	4	26.5
11	14	Nikoleta & Uri	53	2	26.5
13	13	Marianta & Dionisis	78	3	26.0
14	11	Giannis & Eutuxia	127	5	25.4

== Highest and lowest scoring performances ==
Dance	Best Dancer	Best Score	Worst Dancer	Worst Score
Cha-Cha-Cha	Ntoretta Papadimitriou	50	Laura Narjes	28
Tango	Elias Vrettos	45	Giannis Aivazis	25
Foxtrot	Elias Vrettos	46	Vasia Trifylli	22
Jive	Ntoretta Papadimitriou; Elias Vrettos	50	Giannis Aivazis	22
Rumba	Elias Vrettos	43	Marianta Pieridi	25
Quickstep	Ntoretta Papadimitriou	49	Giannis Aivazis	25
Samba	Laura Narjes	45	Vana Mparmpa	21
Mambo	Nikos Anadiotis	42	Giannis Aivazis	25
Viennese Waltz	Elias Vrettos	48	Kelly Kellekidou	35
Paso Doble	Ntoretta Papadimitriou	50	Giannis Aivazis	30
Freestyle	Ntoretta Papadimitriou; Elias Vrettos	50	Vasia Trifylli	31
Argentine tango	Ntoretta Papadimitriou	50	Vasia Trifylli	35
Disco	Ntoretta Papadimitriou; Elias Vrettos	45	Laura Narjes	40

== Dance chart ==
Couple	1	2	3	4	5	6	7	8	9	10		11		12		13		14		
Ntoretta & Paulos	Cha-Cha-Cha	Foxtrot	Rumba	Samba	Viennese Waltz	Freestyle	Freestyle	Argentine tango	Freestyle	Paso Doble	Boogie	Jive	Cha-Cha-Cha	Disco	Paso Doble	Quickstep	Freestyle	Argentine tango	Jive	Freestyle
Elias & Claudia-Anna	Tango	Jive	Quickstep	Mambo	Paso Doble	Freestyle	Freestyle	Cha-Cha-Cha	Freestyle	Viennese Waltz	Boogie	Foxtrot	Cha-Cha-Cha	Disco	Tango	Rumba	Freestyle	Quickstep	Jive	Freestyle
Laura & Giannis	Cha-Cha-Cha	Foxtrot	Rumba	Samba	Viennese Waltz	Freestyle	Freestyle	Argentine tango	Freestyle	Paso Doble	Boogie	Jive	Cha-Cha-Cha	Disco	Samba	Quickstep	Freestyle			Jive
Nikos & Anastasia	Tango	Jive	Quickstep	Mambo	Paso Doble	Freestyle	Freestyle	Cha-Cha-Cha	Freestyle	Viennese Waltz	Boogie	Foxtrot	Cha-Cha-Cha	Disco	Mambo					Paso Doble
Spyros & Maria	Tango	Jive	Quickstep	Mambo	Paso Doble	Freestyle	Freestyle	Cha-Cha-Cha	Freestyle	Viennese Waltz	Boogie	Foxtrot	Cha-Cha-Cha							Freestyle
Elena & Elias	Cha-Cha-Cha	Foxtrot	Rumba	Samba	Viennese Waltz	Freestyle	Freestyle	Argentine tango	Freestyle	Paso Doble	Boogie									Argentine tango
Kelly & Vaggelis	Cha-Cha-Cha	Foxtrot	Rumba	Samba	Viennese Waltz	Freestyle	Freestyle	Argentine tango	Freestyle											Freestyle
Vasia & Dimitris	Cha-Cha-Cha	Foxtrot	Rumba	Samba	Viennese Waltz	Freestyle	Freestyle	Argentine tango												Freestyle
Giorgos & Emily	Tango	Jive	Quickstep	Mambo	Paso Doble	Freestyle	Freestyle													Tango
Kostas & Anna	Tango	Jive	Quickstep	Mambo	Paso Doble	Freestyle														Paso Doble
Giannis & Eutuxia	Tango	Jive	Quickstep	Mambo	Paso Doble															Paso Doble
Vana & Thodoris	Cha-Cha-Cha	Foxtrot	Rumba	Samba																Argentine tango
Marianta & Dionisis	Cha-Cha-Cha	Foxtrot	Rumba																	Mambo
Nikoleta & Uri	Cha-Cha-Cha	Foxtrot																		

Highest Scoring Dance
Lowest Scoring Dance
Not performed due to illness
Performed but not scored

== Weekly scores ==
Individual judges scores in the chart below (given in parentheses) are listed in this order from left to right: Galena Velikova, Alexis Kostalas, Katia Dandoulaki, Giannis Latsios and Fokas Evaggelinos.

=== Week 1 ===
Running order

Couple	Score	Dance
Kelly & Vaggelis	30 (6,6,6,6,6)	Cha-Cha-Cha
Nikos & Anastasia	29 (6,5,7,5,6)	Tango
Vasia & Dimitris	32 (6,6,7,6,7)	Cha-Cha-Cha
Ntoretta & Paulos	34 (7,6,7,7,7)	Cha-Cha-Cha
Giannis & Eutuxia	25 (5,6,5,4,5)	Tango
Vana & Thodoris	31 (6,6,6,6,7)	Cha-Cha-Cha
Kostas & Anna	34 (7,7,7,6,7)	Tango
Laura & Giannis	28 (5,6,6,5,6)	Cha-Cha-Cha
Spyros & Maria	31 (7,6,6,6,6)	Tango
Elena & Elias	32 (6,6,7,6,7)	Cha-Cha-Cha
Giorgos & Emily	30 (6,6,6,6,6)	Tango
Nikoleta & Uri	30 (6,6,6,6,6)	Cha-Cha-Cha
Elias & Claudia-Anna	35 (7,7,7,7,7)	Tango
Marianta & Dionisis	29 (6,6,6,5,6)	Cha-Cha-Cha

=== Week 2 ===
Running order

Couple	Score	Dance	Result
Spyros & Maria	27 (5,5,6,5,6)	Jive	Safe
Nikoleta & Uri	23 (4,5,5,4,5)	Foxtrot	Eliminated
Nikos & Anastasia	23 (4,5,4,5,5)	Jive	Safe
Elena & Elias	25 (5,5,5,5,5)	Foxtrot	Safe
Giannis & Eutuxia	22 (4,4,5,5,4)	Jive	Safe
Marianta & Dionisis	24 (5,5,5,4,5)	Foxtrot	Bottom two
Elias & Claudia-Anna	30 (6,6,6,6,6)	Jive	Safe
Vana & Thodoris	24 (4,5,5,5,5)	Foxtrot	Safe
Vasia & Dimitris	22 (4,5,4,4,5)	Foxtrot	Safe
Kostas & Anna	26 (5,5,6,5,5)	Jive	Safe
Laura & Giannis	23 (4,4,5,5,5)	Foxtrot	Safe
Giorgos & Emily	29 (6,5,6,6,6)	Jive	Safe
Ntoretta & Paulos	31 (6,6,6,6,7)	Foxtrot	Safe
Kelly & Dimitris	25 (5,5,5,5,5)	Foxtrot	Safe

=== Week 3 ===
Running order

Couple	Score	Dance	Result
Giorgos & Emily	30 (6,6,7,6,5)	Quickstep	Safe
Marianta & Dionisis	25 (5,5,5,5,5)	Rumba	Eliminated
Elias & Claudia-Anna	34 (7,7,8,6,6)	Quickstep	Safe
Laura & Giannis	28 (5,5,6,6,6)	Rumba	Safe
Kostas & Anna	26 (5,5,5,6,5)	Quickstep	Safe
Ntoretta & Paulos	34 (6,6,8,7,7)	Rumba	Safe
Vasia & Dimitris	26 (5,5,5,6,5)	Rumba	Safe
Nikos & Anastasia	27 (5,6,5,6,5)	Quickstep	Safe
Spyros & Maria	34 (7,7,7,7,6)	Quickstep	Safe
Kelly & Vaggelis	33 (6,6,7,7,7)	Rumba	Safe
Vana & Thodoris	30 (5,6,7,6,6)	Rumba	Bottom two
Giannis & Eutuxia	25 (5,5,5,5,5)	Quickstep	Safe
Elena & Elias	33 (6,7,7,6,7)	Rumba	Safe

=== Week 4 ===
Running order

Couple	Score	Dance	Result
Elena & Elias	30 (6,6,6,6,6)	Samba	Bottom two
Nikos & Anastasia	27 (5,6,5,6,5)	Mambo	Safe
Vana & Thodoris	21 (4,4,5,4,4)	Samba	Eliminated
Giannis & Eutuxia	25 (5,5,5,5,5)	Mambo	Safe
Laura & Giannis	35 (6,7,7,8,7)	Samba	Safe
Giorgos & Emily	30 (6,6,6,6,6)	Mambo	Safe
Elias & Claudia-Anna	31 (6,6,6,6,7)	Mambo	Safe
Vasia & Dimitris	26 (5,5,6,5,5)	Samba	Safe
Kelly & Vaggelis	31 (6,6,6,7,6)	Samba	Safe
Spyros & Maria	33 (7,6,7,6,7)	Mambo	Safe
Ntoretta & Paulos	35 (6,7,8,7,7)	Samba	Safe
Kostas & Anna	33 (6,7,7,6,7)	Mambo	Safe

=== Week 5 ===
Running order

Couple	Score	Dance	Result
Nikos & Anastasia	33 (6,7,7,7,6)	Paso Doble	Safe
Spyros & Maria	34 (7,7,7,7,6)	Paso Doble	Bottom two
Kelly & Vaggelis	35 (7,7,7,7,7)	Viennese Waltz	Safe
Giannis & Eutuxia	30 (6,6,6,6,6)	Paso Doble	Eliminated
Giorgos & Emily	32 (7,6,6,6,7)	Paso Doble	Safe
Elena & Elias	36 (7,7,7,8,7)	Viennese Waltz	Safe
Kostas & Anna	38 (7,8,8,7,8)	Paso Doble	Safe
Ntoretta & Paulos	40 (8,8,8,8,8)	Viennese Waltz	Safe
Laura & Giannis	38 (7,8,8,8,7)	Viennese Waltz	Safe
Elias & Claudia-Anna	36 (7,7,7,8,7)	Paso Doble	Safe

=== Week 6 ===
Running order

Couple	Score	Dance	Result
Kostas & Anna	35 (7,7,7,7,7)	Freestyle	Eliminated
Elena & Elias	34 (7,7,6,7,7)	Freestyle	Safe
Elias & Claudia-Anna	40 (8,8,8,8,8)	Freestyle	Safe
Kelly & Vaggelis	35 (7,7,7,7,7)	Freestyle	Safe
Spyros & Maria	35 (7,7,7,7,7)	Freestyle	Safe
Ntoretta & Paulos	42 (9,8,9,8,8)	Freestyle	Safe
Giorgos & Emily	37 (8,7,7,8,7)	Freestyle	Safe
Laura & Giannis	36 (7,7,7,8,7)	Freestyle	Safe
Vasia & Dimitris	31 (6,6,7,6,6)	Freestyle	Safe
Nikos & Anastasia	38 (8,7,7,8,7)	Freestyle	Bottom two

=== Week 7 ===
Running order

Couple	Score	Dance	Result
Laura & Giannis	37 (7,8,8,7,7)	Freestyle	Bottom two
Nikos & Anastasia	36 (7,8,7,7,7)	Freestyle	Safe
Elena & Elias	37 (7,7,8,8,7)	Freestyle	Safe
Elias & Claudia-Anna	45 (9,9,9,9,9)	Freestyle	Safe
Giorgos & Emily	39 (8,8,8,8,7)	Freestyle	Eliminated
Vasia & Dimitris	31 (6,6,7,6,6)	Freestyle	Safe
Ntoretta & Paulos	44 (9,8,9,9,9)	Freestyle	Safe
Kelly & Vaggelis	40 (8,8,8,8,8)	Freestyle	Safe
Spyros & Maria	40 (8,8,8,8,8)	Freestyle	Safe

=== Week 8 ===
Running order

Couple	Score	Dance	Result
Kelly & Vaggelis	42 (8,8,9,9,8)	Argentine tango	Safe
Spyros & Maria	40 (8,8,8,8,8)	Cha-Cha-Cha	Safe
Laura & Giannis	41 (8,8,9,8,8)	Argentine tango	Bottom two
Nikos & Anastasia	40 (8,8,8,8,8)	Cha-Cha-Cha	Safe
Elena & Elias	42 (9,8,8,9,8)	Argentine tango	Safe
Elias & Claudia-Anna	42 (8,9,9,8,8)	Cha-Cha-Cha	Safe
Ntoretta & Paulos	46 (9,9,9,10,9)	Argentine tango	Safe
Vasia & Dimitris	35 (7,7,7,7,7)	Argentine tango	Eliminated

=== Week 9 ===
Running order

Couple	Score	Dance	Result
Laura & Giannis	40 (8,8,8,8,8)	Freestyle	Bottom two
Elias & Claudia-Anna	45 (9,9,9,9,9)	Freestyle	Safe
Kelly & Vaggelis	40 (8,8,8,8,8)	Freestyle	Eliminated
Spyros & Maria	43 (8,9,8,9,9)	Freestyle	Safe
Ntoretta & Paulos	46 (9,9,10,9,9)	Freestyle	Safe
Nikos & Anastasia	45 (9,9,9,9,9)	Freestyle	Safe
Elena & Elias	44 (9,8,9,9,9)	Freestyle	Safe

=== Week 10 ===
Running order

Couple	Score	Dance	Result
Elena & Elias	45 (9,9,9,9,9)	Paso Doble	Eliminated
Elias & Claudia-Anna	48 (9,10,10,9,10)	Viennese Waltz	Safe
Laura & Giannis	42 (8,8,8,9,9)	Paso Doble	Bottom two
Nikos & Anastasia	41 (8,8,8,8,9)	Viennese Waltz	Safe
Spyros & Maria	44 (9,9,8,9,9)	Viennese Waltz	Safe
Ntoretta & Paulos	48 (9,10,10,9,10)	Paso Doble	Safe
Elias & Claudia-Anna; Ntoretta & Paulos; Spyros & Maria; Laura & Giannis; Nikos & Anastasia; Elena & Elias	10; 9; 8; 7; 6; 5	Dance Boogie Marathon	

=== Week 11 ===
Running order

Couple	Score	Dance	Result
Laura & Giannis	40 (8,8,8,8,8)	Jive	Safe
Nikos & Anastasia	39 (8,8,8,7,8)	Foxtrot	Bottom two
Spyros & Maria	39 (8,8,8,7,8)	Foxtrot	Eliminated
Ntoretta & Paulos	46 (9,9,9,10,9)	Jive	Safe
Elias & Claudia-Anna	46 (9,9,10,9,9)	Foxtrot	Safe
Laura & Giannis	43 (9,9,9,8,8)	Instant Cha-Cha-Cha	
Nikos & Anastasia	41 (8,9,8,8,8)	Instant Cha-Cha-Cha	
Spyros & Maria	40 (8,8,8,8,8)	Instant Cha-Cha-Cha	
Ntoretta & Paulos	50 (10,10,10,10,10)	Instant Cha-Cha-Cha	
Elias & Claudia-Anna	47 (9,9,10,9,10)	Instant Cha-Cha-Cha	

=== Week 12 ===
During the 11th week Zeta announced that the couples must include some ex-participants of Dancing with the Stars in their second choreography.

Couple	Ex-participant
Nikos & Anastasia	Nadia Boule
Laura & Giannis	Kostas Martakis
Ntoretta & Paulos	Matthildi Maggira
Elias & Claudia-Anna	Eugenia Manolidou

Running order

Couple	Score	Dance	Result
Nikos & Anastassia	42 (9,9,8,8,8)	Disco	Eliminated
Nikos & Anastassia	42 (8,9,9,8,8)	Mambo	Eliminated
Elias & Claudia-Anna	45 (9,9,9,9,9)	Disco	Bottom two
Elias & Claudia-Anna	45 (9,9,9,9,9)	Tango	Bottom two
Laura & Giannis	40 (8,8,8,8,8)	Disco	Safe
Laura & Giannis	45 (9,9,9,9,9)	Samba	Safe
Ntoretta & Paulos	45 (9,9,9,9,9)	Disco	Safe
Ntoretta & Paulos	50 (10,10,10,10,10)	Paso Doble	Safe

=== Week 13: Semi-final ===
Running order

Couple	Score	Dance	Result
Laura & Giannis	40 (8,8,8,8,8)	Quickstep	Third place
Laura & Giannis	39 (8,8,8,8,7)	Freestyle	Third place
Elias & Claudia-Anna	43 (9,9,8,8,9)	Rumba	Bottom Two
Elias & Claudia-Anna	47 (9,9,9,10,10)	Freestyle	Bottom Two
Ntoretta & Paulos	49 (9,10,10,10,10)	Quickstep	Safe
Ntoretta & Paulos	50 (10,10,10,10,10)	Freestyle	Safe

=== Week 14: Final ===
Running order

Couple	Score	Dance	Result
Elias & Claudia-Anna	45 (9,9,9,9,9)	Quickstep	Runner-up
Elias & Claudia-Anna	50 (10,10,10,10,10)	Jive	Runner-up
Elias & Claudia-Anna	50 (10,10,10,10,10)	Freestyle	Runner-up
Ntoretta & Paulos	50 (10,10,10,10,10)	Argentine tango	Winner
Ntoretta & Paulos	50 (10,10,10,10,10)	Jive	Winner
Ntoretta & Paulos	48 (9,9,10,10,10)	Freestyle	Winner

== Call-out order ==
Zeta's call-out order
Order	2	3	4	5	6	7	8	9	10	11	12	13	14
01	Nikos & Anastasia	Kostas & Anna	Giorgos & Emily	Kelly & Vaggelis	Laura & Giannis	Elena & Elias	Spyros & Maria	Ntoretta & Paulos	Elias & Claudia-Anna	Laura & Giannis	Laura & Giannis	Ntoretta & Paulos	Ntoretta & Paulos
02	Kostas & Anna	Nikos & Anastasia	Ntoretta & Paulos	Kostas & Anna	Ntoretta & Paulos	Kelly & Vaggelis	Elena & Elias	Elias & Claudia-Anna	Ntoretta & Paulos	Ntoretta & Paulos	Ntoretta & Paulos	Elias & Claudia-Anna	Elias & Claudia-Anna
03	Vana & Thodoris	Giorgos & Emily	Kostas & Anna	Elias & Claudia-Anna	Vasia & Dimitris	Vasia & Dimitris	Elias & Claudia-Anna	Spyros & Maria	Spyros & Maria	Elias & Claudia-Anna	Elias & Claudia-Anna	Laura & Giannis	
04	Elias & Claudia-Anna	Ntoretta & Paulos	Spyros & Maria	Laura & Giannis	Kelly & Vaggelis	Spyros & Maria	Ntoretta & Paulos	Elena & Elias	Nikos & Anastasia	Nikos & Anastasia	Nikos & Anastasia		
05	Laura & Giannis	Spyros & Maria	Kelly & Vaggelis	Giorgos & Emily	Elias & Claudia-Anna	Elias & Claudia-Anna	Kelly & Vaggelis	Nikos & Anastasia	Laura & Giannis	Spyros & Maria			
06	Elena & Elias	Vasia & Dimitris	Elias & Claudia-Anna	Ntoretta & Paulos	Giorgos & Emily	Nikos & Anastasia	Nikos & Anastasia	Laura & Giannis	Elena & Elias				
07	Ntoretta & Paulos	Elena & Elias	Giannis & Eutuxia	Elena & Elias	Elena & Elias	Ntoretta & Paulos	Laura & Giannis	Kelly & Vaggelis					
08	Spyros & Maria	Elias & Claudia-Anna	Vasia & Dimitris	Nikos & Anastasia	Spyros & Maria	Laura & Giannis	Vasia & Dimitris						
09	Giorgos & Emily	Laura & Giannis	Nikos & Anastasia	Spyros & Maria	Nikos & Anastasia	Giorgos & Emily							
10	Vasia & Dimitris	Kelly & Vaggelis	Laura & Giannis	Giannis & Eutuxia	Kostas & Anna								
11	Kelly & Vaggelis	Giannis & Eutuxia	Elena & Elias	Vasia & Dimitris									
12	Giannis & Eutuxia	Vana & Thodoris	Vana & Thodoris										
13	Marianta & Dionisis	Marianta & Dionisis											
14	Nikoleta & Uri												

This couple came in first place with the judges.
This couple came in last place with the judges.
This couple came in last place with the judges and was eliminated.
This couple was eliminated.
The couple didn't dance this week.
This couple won the competition.
This couple came in second in the competition.
This couple came in third in the competition.

== Guest stars ==
#	Live	Guest	Occupation	Partner	Style
1	8	Katerina Stikoudi	TV Presenter, singer	Dionisis Valmis	Tango
2	8	Trifonas Samaras	Hairstylist	Various dancers	Gangnam Style
3	9	Thomai Apergi	Singer	Uri Dimitrov	Argentine tango
4	9	Katerina Stanisi	Singer	Dionisis Valmis	Paso doble
5	10	Maria Mpekatorou	TV Presenter	Richard Szilagyi	Quickstep
6	10	Mironas Stratis	Singer	Anna Polyzou	Cha-Cha-Cha
7	11	Doukissa Nomikou	TV Presenter	Various dancers	Freestyle
8	12	Natasa Kalogridou	Actress	Dancer	Argentine tango
9	12	Christina Pappa	Actress	Vaggelis Cholevas	Cha-Cha-Cha
10	13	Christos Ferendinos	TV Presenter	Anna Polyzou	Tango
11	13	Argiris Aggelou	Actor	Various dancers	Freestyle
12	14	Zeta Makripoulia	TV Presenter, actress	Nikos Moutsinas	Freestyle
13	14	Nikos Moutsinas	TV Presenter, actress	Zeta Makripoulia	Freestyle
