= Tufts University School of Engineering =

One of the ten schools that comprise Tufts University

Tufts School of Engineering
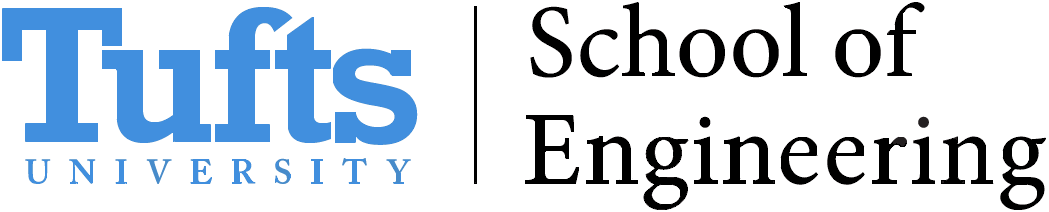
- Type: Private
- Established: 1898
- Dean: Kyongbum Lee
- Faculty: 88
- Undergraduates: 898
- Postgraduates: 612
- Location: Medford/Somerville, Massachusetts, U.S. 42.406°N 71.117°W
- Campus: Urban/Suburban
- Colors: Brown, Blue
- Website: engineering.tufts.edu

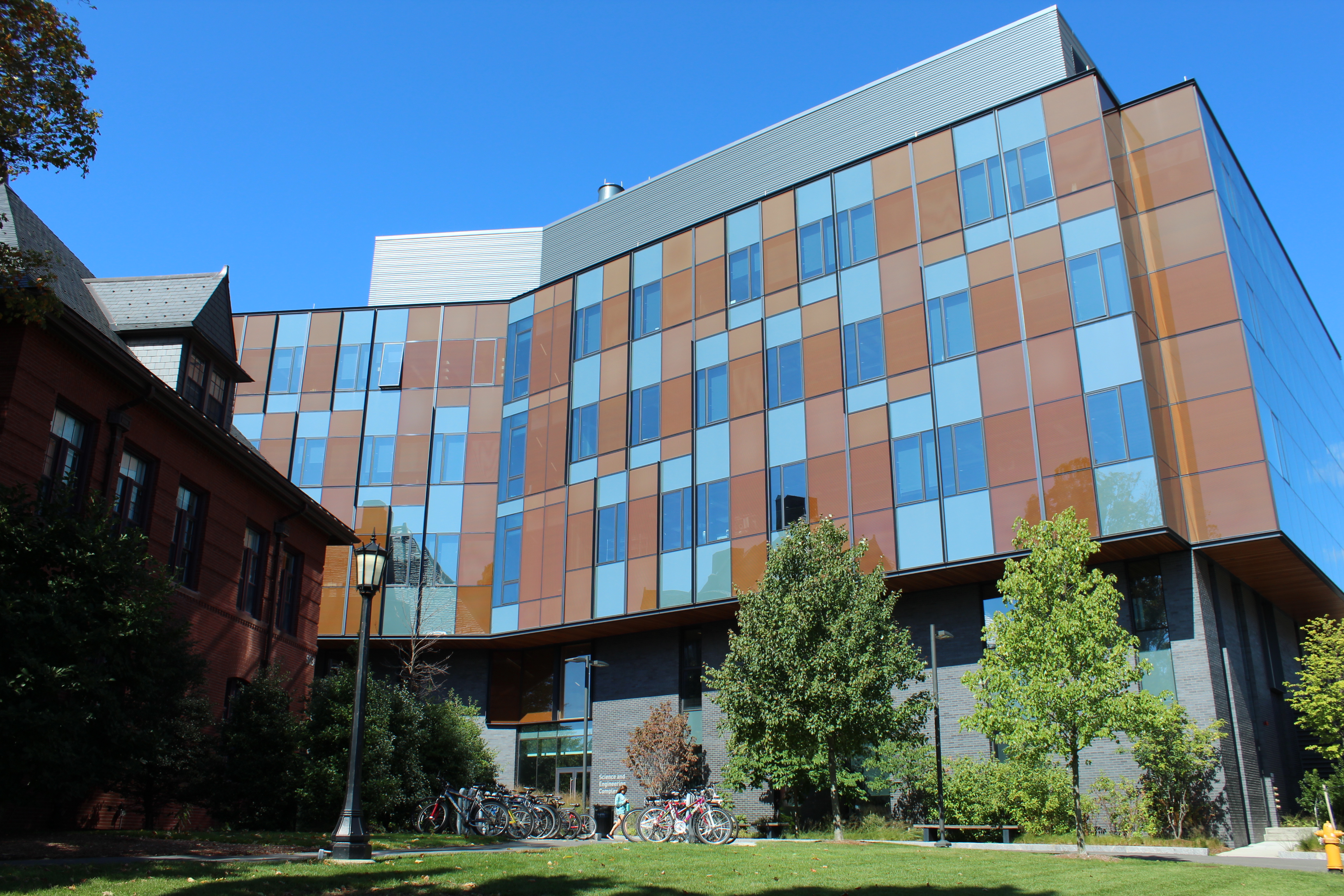
Science and Engineering Complex - School of Engineering.

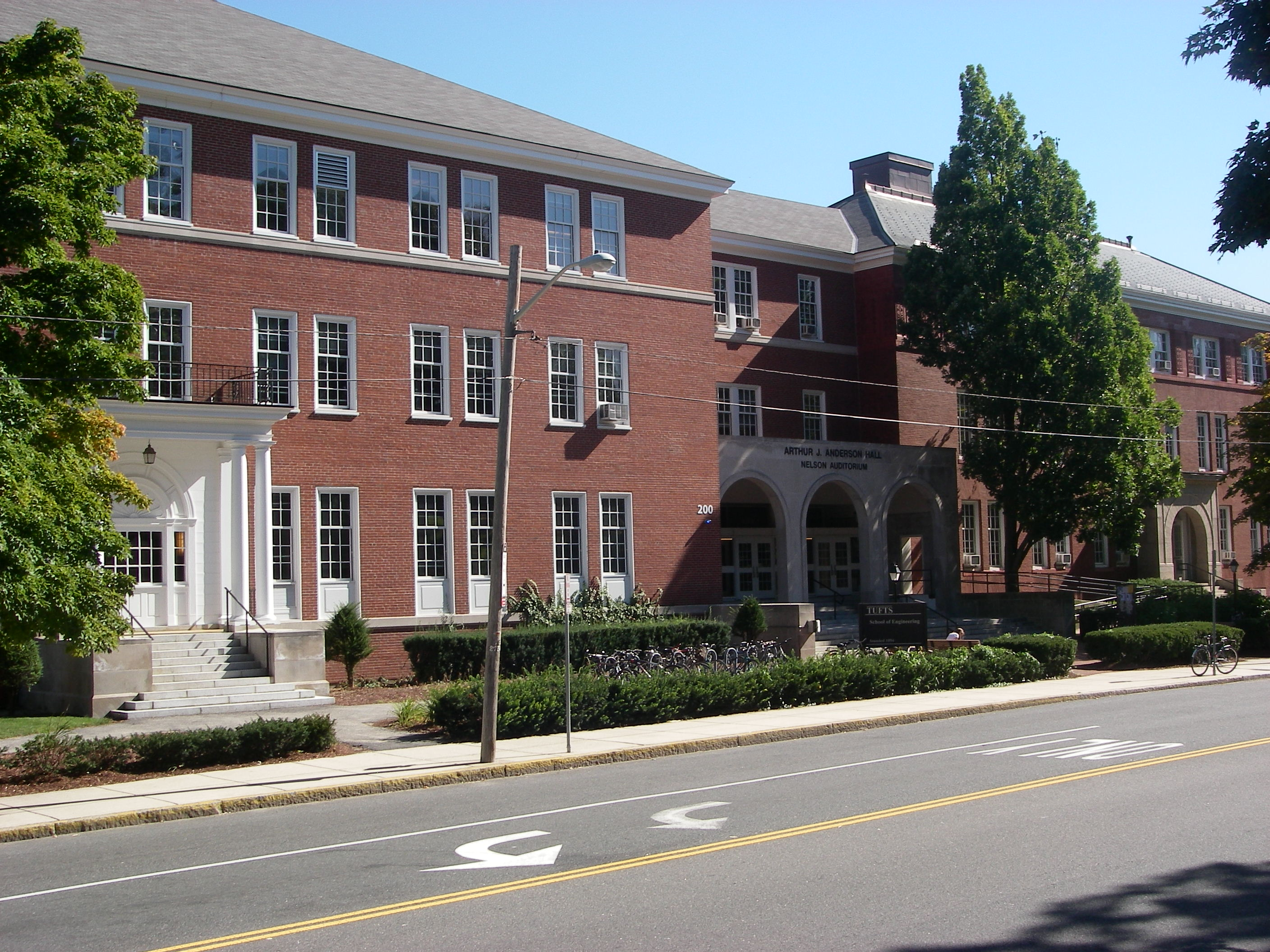
Anderson Hall - Engineering Headquarters

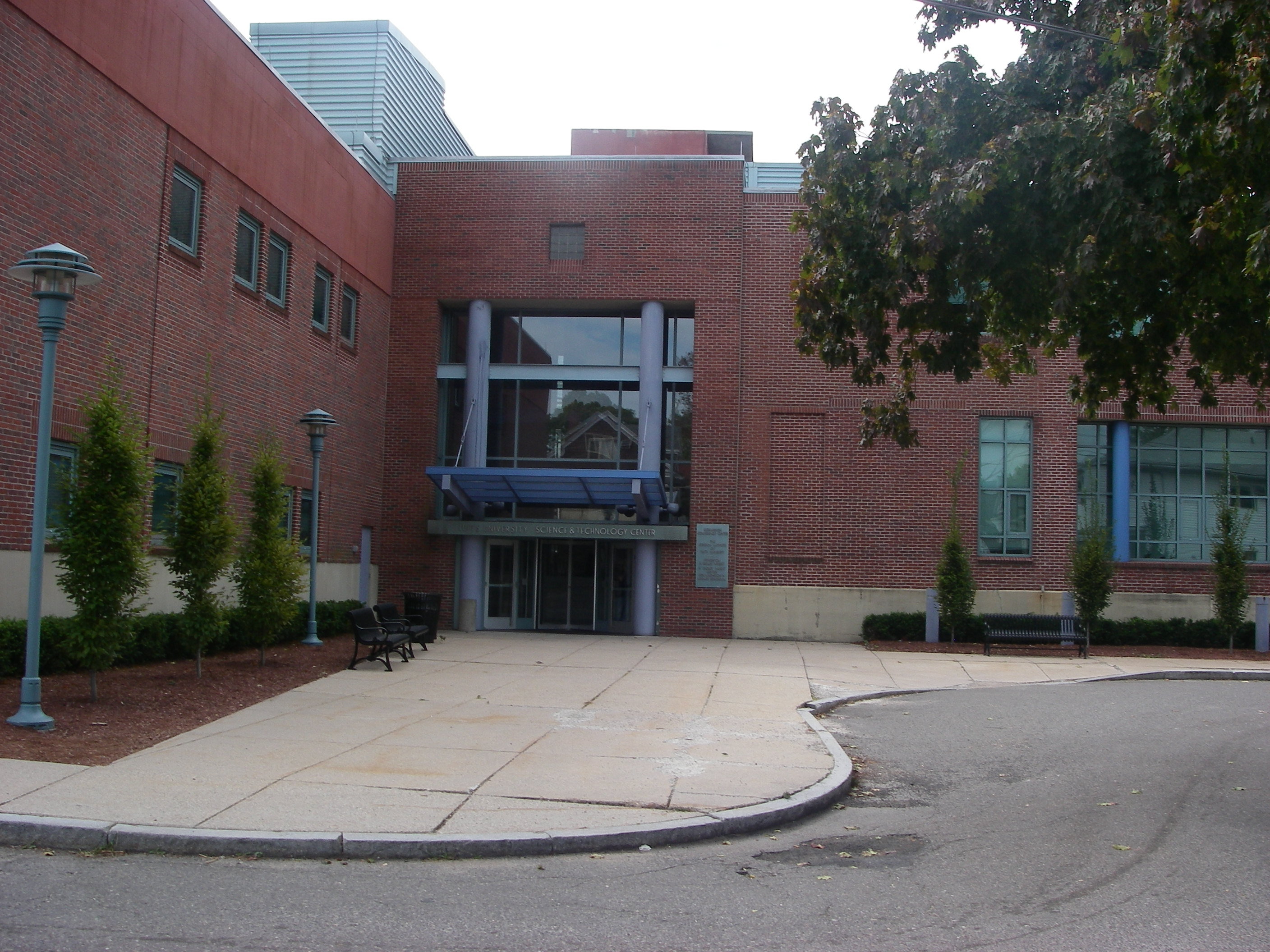
Science and Technology Center on Colby St.

The School of Engineering is one of the ten schools that comprise Tufts University. The school offers undergraduate and graduate degrees in several engineering disciplines and computer science fields. Along with the School of Arts and Sciences (A&S) and the Fletcher School of Law and Diplomacy, the School of Engineering is located on the university's main campus in Medford and Somerville, Massachusetts. Currently, the engineering school enrolls more than 800 full-time undergraduates and 600 graduate students. The school employs over 100 full-time and part-time faculty members.

== History ==
Engineering instruction began at Tufts College in academic year 1865–1866, with the introduction of a three-year degree program in civil engineering. Students in this program received the degree of civil engineer. In 1890, the Department of Electrical Engineering was created, and in academic year 1892–1893, the course of study was extended to four years. With the advent of the four-year program the degrees granted were bachelor of civil or electrical engineering. Tufts College added the Department of Mechanical Engineering and the Department of Chemical Engineering in 1894 and 1898, respectively. In 1898, the trustees voted to formally establish an undergraduate College of Engineering with Gardner C. Anthony as the first dean. As part of an administrative reorganization in 1904, the College of Engineering became part of the new Faculty of Arts and Sciences, along with the School (later the College) of Liberal Arts, the Graduate School of Arts and Sciences, and after 1910, Jackson College for Women.

To accommodate a high demand for facilities in engineering programs, Anderson Hall opened in 1960 to host facilities and an engineering library. The College of Engineering added graduate study to its curriculum beginning in 1961, with master's degrees available in all four departments. It added Ph.D. programs in mechanical engineering in 1963, electrical and chemical engineering in 1964, engineering design in 1981, and civil engineering in 1985. The College also offered a combined bachelor's/master's degree program. In 1992, the Gordon Institute, the first organization dedicated to the training of leaders in engineering, became part of Tufts University. In 1999, the College of Engineering became the School of Engineering when oversight of graduate engineering programs was transferred from the Graduate School of Arts and Sciences. As part of the same reorganization the Faculty of Arts and Science became the Faculty of Arts, Sciences, and Engineering (AS&E).

Ioannis Miaoulis was dean from 1994 to 2002, while Linda Abriola was dean from 2002 to 2015.

== Admissions ==
Admission statistics
| | 2023 | 2022 | 2021 | 2020 |
|---|---|---|---|---|
| Applicants | 7,085 | 6,934 | 5,869 | 4,577 |
| Admits | 637 | 621 | 680 | 708 |
| Admit rate | 9.0% | 9.0% | 11.6% | 15.5% |
| Enrolled | 281 | 269 | 297 | 262 |
| SAT range | 1470-1550 | 1460-1540 | 1430-1540 | 1430-1540 |
| ACT range | 33-35 | 34-35 | 33-35 | 33-35 |

For the School of Engineering Class of 2023, 4,371 students applied and 667 were accepted, resulting in an acceptance rate of 15%. Of those accepted 41% chose to enroll. For students entering the School of Engineering as part of the Class of 2024, the average verbal/critical reading SAT score was 711 and the average math SAT score was 764. The average ACT composite score was 34. Additionally the percent of those enrolled receiving financial aid was 53%. Tufts School of Engineering has 88 full-time faculty members and a Ph.D. student-faculty ratio of 2.6:1, according to the 2018 data compiled by U.S. News & World Report.

== Organization and degree programs ==
The School of Engineering is under the supervision of a dean, appointed by the president and the provost, with the approval of the Trustees of Tufts College (the university's governing board). The dean oversees undergraduate and graduate education and research in six academic departments and Tufts Gordon Institute.

The School of Engineering and the School of Arts and Sciences form the Faculty of Arts, Sciences, and Engineering (AS&E), a deliberative body under the chairmanship of the president of the university. Historically, the Arts and Sciences and Engineering were part of the same administrative division, sharing a common leadership and budget. The two schools continue to share many administrative functions including undergraduate admissions, student affairs, library, and information technology services.

The School of Engineering currently offers bachelor of science degrees in chemical engineering, civil engineering, computer science, electrical engineering, environmental engineering, data science, computer engineering, mechanical engineering, and biomedical engineering. There are also bachelor of science programs in human factors engineering, engineering science, and engineering physics.

Graduate programs include Master of Science and Doctor of Philosophy degree curricula, as well as certificates, in:

- Bioengineering (M.S.)
- Biomedical Engineering (Certificate, M.S., Ph.D.)
- Biotechnology Engineering (Certificate, Ph.D.)
- Chemical and Biological Engineering (M.S., Ph.D.)
- Civil and Environmental Engineering (Certificate, M.S., Ph.D.)
- Cognitive Science (Joint Ph.D.)
- Computer Engineering (Certificate, M.S.)
- Computer Science (Certificate, M.S., Ph.D., Post-baccalaureate)
- Cybersecurity and Public Policy (M.S.)
- Data Science (Certificate, M.S.)
- Electrical Engineering (M.S.)
- Electrical and Computer Engineering (P.h.D.)
- Engineering Education (Certificate)
- Engineering Management (M.S.)
- Environmental Management (Certificate)
- Human Factors Engineering (M.S.)
- Human Factors in Medical Devices and Systems (Certificate)
- Human-Computer Interaction (Certificate)
- Human-Robot Interaction (M.S., joint Ph.D.)
- Innovation and Management (M.S.)
- Manufacturing Engineering (Certificate)
- Materials Science and Engineering (M.S., joint Ph.D.)
- Mechanical Engineering (M.S., Ph.D.)
- Microwave and Wireless Engineering (Certificate)
- Offshore Wind Energy Engineering (M.S.)
- Software Systems Engineering (M.S.)

The School of Engineering maintains dual degree programs with the School of Arts and Sciences and the Fletcher School of Law and Diplomacy and joint degree programs with the School of Medicine, the Sackler School of Graduate Biomedical Sciences, and the Cummings School of Veterinary Medicine.

== Centers and institutes ==
The School of Engineering hosts a number of centers and institutes, including the Center for STEM Diversity, the Center for Engineering Education and Outreach, the Center for Applied Brain and Cognitive Sciences, and Tufts Gordon Institute.

Center for Applied Brain and Cognitive Sciences (CABCS)

The CABCS is a collaborative research initiative between the U.S. Army and Tufts University. The center hosts a virtual reality lab for monitoring neurological, psychological, and behavior responses. Research at the center focuses around the measurement, predictability, and improvement of a person’s cognitive capabilities in high-stress situations.

Tufts Center for Engineering Education and Outreach (CEEO)

Founded in 1996 as one of the first university-based engineering education centers in the U.S. CEEO researchers, staff, and students have contributed to key findings on teaching and learning in engineering and the development of tools and technologies used globally. CEEO initiatives include:

- Novel Engineering: Program that integrates engineering and literacy in elementary and middle school classrooms.
- Tufts Student Teacher Outreach Mentorship Program (STOMP): Community outreach program.
- Teacher Engineering Education Program: An 18-month certification for in-service teachers in K-12 engineering education.
- LEGO Engineering: A web-based resource for educators who use LEGO materials.

Tufts Center for STEM Diversity (CSD)

The Center for STEM Diversity acts as a resource for student-led STEM based organizations on campus and hosts several programs to focus on recruiting, retaining, and graduating underrepresented students.

- Bridge to Engineering Success at Tufts (BEST): Four-year program dedicated to the retention and graduation of underrepresented students in engineering programs at Tufts.
- STEM Ambassadors: Community outreach program where Tufts undergraduates go into local high schools and encourage participation and curiosity in STEM fields.
- Redefining the Image of Science and Engineering (RISE): Academic advising course that supports talented, first-generation Tufts students majoring in science and engineering.
- Louis Stokes Alliance for Minority Participation (LSAMP): Alliance-based program that works with colleges and universities to “diversify the nation’s STEM workforce” by encouraging minority participation in scientific research and knowledge generation/utilization.

Tufts Gordon Institute (TGI)

Students learn key management skills and how to launch their own businesses. Degrees offered by TGI include an M.S. in Innovation and Management and an M.S. in Engineering Management. Each year, the School of Engineering and TGI provide students with a platform to showcase their work and participation in research during the annual $100k New Ventures Competition.

== Research and faculty ==
Research carried out by faculty and students covers a wide spectrum of fields and disciplines. The School's broad research themes are: energy, water, and the environment; human health and bioengineering; human-technology interface; intelligent systems; and learning science.

Notable research and faculty include:

- Maria Flytzani-Stephanopoulos, chemical engineer who has authored more than 160 journal articles describing significant advances in catalysis, surface chemistry, and single-atom catalysts
- Christos Georgakis, fellow of the American Institute of Chemical Engineers
- Mark Kachanov, Editor-in-Chief of Elsevier
- Igor Sokolov, engineer studying physics of cancer and aging, pioneering novel imaging methods, developing new nanomaterials
- David Kaplan, biomedical engineer studying biopolymer engineering and silk-based materials
- Frederick Nelson, professor emeritus of mechanical engineering
- Fiorenzo Omenetto, pioneering the use of silk as a material platform for photonics, optoelectronics, and high-technology applications
- Karen Panetta, recipient of the Presidential Award for Excellence in Science, Mathematics and Engineering Mentoring
- Sameer Sonkusale, developing biomedical devices, circuits, and systems
- Diane Souvaine, computer science professor and chair of the National Science Board
- Deborah Sunter, mechanical engineer using computational modeling and data science techniques to explore technology innovation and improved environmental sustainability
- John H. Sununu (former professor of mechanical engineering and dean of engineering), governor of New Hampshire, chief of staff of the White House for George H. W. Bush
- Kristen Wendell, recipient of the Presidential Early Career Award for Scientists and Engineers and mechanical engineer studying engineering education
- Valencia Koomson, specializing in nanoelectronic circuits and systems for medical devices, and racial bias in medical devices and algorithms

== Notable alumni ==
- Robert Adams (B.S., 1976), electrical engineer, fellow at Analog Devices, Inc. and leader in development of sigma-delta converters
- Stephen Moulton Babcock, agricultural chemist who pioneered the development of nutrition as a science
- Scott C. Beardsley (B.S., 1985), Dean of the University of Virginia Darden School of Business
- Louis Berger (B.S., 1936), civil engineer and founder of Louis Berger Group
- Asa White Kenney Billings (B.S., 1929), American hydroelectric engineer and pioneer of the electrification of Brazil
- John T. Blake (B.S., 1921), scientist at Simplex Wire and Cable company
- Vannevar Bush (B.S., M.S. 1913), engineer and scientist noted for his work on the atom bomb and early computing, co-founder of Raytheon
- Peter Cheever (B.S., 1975), former president of LeMessurier Consultants
- Frederick Church, American engineer known for early roller coaster design
- Richard Coar (B.S., 1942), aeronautical engineer, recipient of the Daniel Guggenheim Medal.
- Leo Otis Colbert (B.S., 1907), Director of the United States Coast and Geodetic Survey, predecessor of the National Oceanic and Atmospheric Administration Commissioned Officer Corps
- Horace Dediu (M.S., 1992), Romanian-American industry analyst known for his work at Apple Inc.
- John J. Donovan (B.S., 1963), entrepreneur and founder of Cambridge Technology Partners
- Macy DuBois (B.S., 1951), Canadian architect of several landmark Toronto buildings
- Ben duPont (B.S., 1986), American businessman, son of Pete du Pont
- Frederick M. Ellis (B.S., 1929), American sportsman and namesake of Tufts' Ellis Oval
- Rolf Faste (M.S., 1971), American designer, director of Stanford Joint Program in Design
- Richard H. Frenkiel (B.S., 1963), American engineer known for the development of cellular networks
- Hollis Godfrey (B.S., 1895), former president of Drexel Institute of Art, Science and Industry
- Seth Godin (B.S., 1982), American author and former dot-com business executive.
- Bernard Marshall Gordon, inventor who holds over thirty patents; former president and CEO of Analogic Corporation, Neurologica Corporation, and Gordon Engineering Company
- Jesse Grupper (born 1997), Olympic rock climber
- Eduardo Hochschild (B.S., 1987), billionaire chairman of Hochschild Mining
- Ryan Hewitt (B.S., 1996), Grammy Award winning record producer
- Robert Kayen (B.S., 1981), professor of civil and environmental engineering at University of Berkeley, previously University of California, Los Angeles
- Ellen J. Kullman (B.S., 1978), ex-CEO of DuPont, adviser on Obama's Council on Jobs and Competitiveness, member of Board of Directors of Goldman Sachs
- Jeffrey Lam (B.S., 1973), vice-chairman of the Business and Professionals Alliance for Hong Kong
- Walter E. Lawrence (B.S., 1927), former mayor of Medford, Massachusetts
- Laurence Marshall (B.S., 1911), co-founder of American Appliance Company, later Raytheon
- Gina McCarthy (M.S., 1981), Administrator of the EPA under President Obama
- Rick McKenney (B.S., 1991), CEO of Unum
- Ioannis N. Miaoulis (B.S., 1983, M.A. 1986, Ph.D. 1987), former president and director of Boston Museum of Science, President of Roger Williams University
- Umberto Milletti (B.S., 1985), CEO and founder of InsideView
- Joseph Neubauer (B.S., 1963), former CEO and currently chairman of the board of Aramark Corporation
- Pierre Omidyar (B.S., 1988), billionaire founder of eBay
- Joseph A. Paradiso (B.S., 1977), Director of MIT Media Lab's Responsive Environments Group
- Leon Patitsas (B.S., 1997), founder of Atlas Maritime
- Frederick Stark Pearson, electrical engineer and businessman
- Thomas F. Quatieri (B.S., 1973), electrical engineer, faculty member at MIT Lincoln Laboratory
- Kristen Ransom, (M.S., 2018), engineer and social entrepreneur, CTO of IncluDe Web Design and Development
- John Reif (B.S., 1973), computer science, nanotechnology, and DNA researcher and professor
- Kristina Roegner (B.S., 1990), member of the Ohio House of Representatives
- Mitchell Rose (B.S., 1973), American director, known for comedic work and dance film
- David Rosowsky (B.S./M.S. 1987), Provost and Senior Vice President of the University of Vermont, former dean of engineering of Rensselaer Polytechnic Institute.
- Keith Ross, NYU computer science professor; dean of engineering NYU Shanghai; ACM and IEEE Fellow
- Charles Russo (M.S., 1998), Senior Principal and CEO of Simpson Gumpertz & Heger Inc.
- Ellery Schempp (B.S., 1962), physicist and political activist
- Phillip Hagar Smith (B.S., 1928), inventor of the Smith chart, a graphical aid to assist in solving problems with transmission lines and matching circuits
- Kevin J. Sullivan (B.S., 1987), Associate Professor at University of Virginia, known for work with ultra-large-scale (ULS) systems
- William L. Uanna (B.S., M.S.), American security expert known for his work on Manhattan Project
- Gordon Lynn Walls (B.S., 1926), American professor of optometry at the University of California, Berkeley
- Norbert Wiener (B.A., 1909), mathematician known as the founder of cybernetics
- Michelle Ann Williams (M.S., 1986), Dean of Harvard T.H. Chan School of Public Health
