= Lemos (surname) =

Lemos is a Portuguese-language surname. It can be also Greek (Λεμός).

Notable people by that name include:

== Portuguese surname ==
- Álvaro Lemos (born 1993), Spanish footballer
- Amanda Lemos (born 1987), Brazilian mixed martial artist
- Ana Cláudia Lemos (born 1988), Brazilian athlete
- Daniel Lemos (born 1990), Brazilian footballer
- Ester de Lemos (born 1929), Portuguese writer and former politician
- Gaspar de Lemos (15th century), Portuguese explorer
- Gerard Lemos, Baron Lemos (born 1958), British-Indian social policy researcher, author and life peer
- Manuel Gayoso de Lemos (1747–1799), Spanish governor of Louisiana
- Norberto Lemos (born 1964), Brazilian football player and coach
- Tiago Lemos (born 1977), Portuguese football player
- Waldemar Lemos (born 1954), Brazilian football coach

== Greek surname ==
- Costas Lemos (1910–1995), Greek billionaire shipping tycoon
- Lemos family, prominent Greek ship owning family
- Michael Lemos (born 1955), London-based Greek heir
