= Rudra Pratap =

Indian academician

- Occupation: Professor
- Scientific career
- Fields: Mechanical, MEMS, NEMS
- Workplaces: Indian Institute of Science

Rudra Pratap is an Indian academician and the vice-chancellor of Plaksha University, Mohali. Previously, he was a professor of mechanical engineering at the Indian Institute of Science (IISc), Bangalore. Among other research interests, he works in the field of microelectromechanical systems (MEMS) and used to head India's first research lab in the field of MEMS, the CranesSci MEMS Lab at the Indian Institute of Science, Bangalore. His book on MATLAB Getting Started with MATLAB 7 is popular among the students of engineering. He is also the chair for the Centre of Nanoscience and Engineering (CeNSE).

Pratap is an associate editor of Shock and Vibration Journal, which publishes articles on various aspects of shocks and vibration including vibration measurements, vibration condition monitoring, shock hardening, fluid-structure interaction, impact biodynamics, vehicle dynamics, and gun dynamics.

== Education and work ==
Pratap obtained his B.Tech from the Indian Institute of Technology, Kharagpur, in 1985. He then obtained his MS from the University of Arizona, Tucson, in 1987, which was followed by a PhD from Cornell University, Ithaca, in 1993. He joined the Indian Institute of Science in 1996.

== Books authored ==
- Getting Started with MATLAB 7: A Quick Introduction for Scientists and Engineers, Oxford University Press, 2005.
- Introduction to Statics and Dynamics, with Andy Ruina, Oxford University Press, 2002.
