= Frederick Nelson =

American mechanical engineer

Frederick Nelson (1932 – January 7, 2009) was professor emeritus of mechanical engineering at Tufts University School of Engineering in Medford, Massachusetts, USA. His areas of professional interest included acoustics, vibration, shock (mechanics) and rotordynamics. He wrote or co-authored more than 50 articles in professional publications. He wrote a monograph entitled An Introduction to Rotordynamics which was published posthumously by SAVIAC. Professor Nelson graduated from the Tufts College of Engineering in 1954 and received his Ph.D. in applied mechanics from Harvard University in 1961. He joined the Tufts faculty in 1955. He was Dean of the College of Engineering from 1980 to 1994.

Professor Nelson was a Fellow of the Acoustical Society of America, a Fellow of the American Society of Mechanical Engineers, a Fellow of the American Association for the Advancement of Science, and a past associate editor of Applied Mechanics Review.

== Selected publications ==
- "A Review of the Origins and Current Status of Rotor Dynamics" presented at IFToMM 2002, Sydney, Australia.
- "A Review of Vibration Control Methods" with D.S. Nokes, presented at the 2002 Annual Meeting of the Vibration Institute, Pittsburgh, PA.
- "Rotor Dynamics: Critical Speeds", published in Sound and Vibration, May 2002.
- "Rotor Dynamics: Instabilities" published in Sound and Vibration, September 2002.
- "A Brief History of Early Rotor Dynamics" published in Sound and Vibration, June 2003.
- "Rotordynamics without Equations" published in International Journal of COMADEM, vol. 10, no. 3, July 2007, ISSN 1363-7681.
- Nelson, F. (2011). An Introduction to Rotordynamics. Vol. SVM-19.
