= Moraitis School =

Co-ed private school in Athens, Greece

Coordinates: 38.0120°N 23.7761°E

The Moraitis School Σχολή Μωραΐτη
- Type: Privately owned, anonymous society
- Industry: Education: primary and secondary education
- Founded: 1936 by Charles Beregean as Πρότυπον Λύκειον Αθηνών (adopted current name in 1976)
- Headquarters: Athens, Greece
- Website: moraitis.edu.gr

The Moraitis School (Greek: Σχολή Μωραΐτη, romanized: Scholi Moraiti) is a co-educational private school in Athens, Greece. It is located in Psychico, a suburb north of the Greek capital. Its teaching aims at university entry.

It is one of the largest private schools in Athens by enrollment, with 1700 students and 240 teachers in kindergarten, primary, middle school and high school.

== History ==
The school was founded in 1936 by Charles Beregean (Karolos Berzan), a mathematician (there is no source verifying either a degree or any articles in mathematics authored by Beregean), under the name “Standard Lyceum of Athens” (Πρότυπον Λύκειον Αθηνών, Protipon Likion Athinón). It moved to its current location in 1952, when ownership was transferred to Antonis Moraitis – whose name the school has adopted since 1976. After Antonis Moraitis died in 1981, the property and administration of the school were transferred to his daughters: Chrysanthi Moraiti-Kartali (middle and high school) and Katerina Moraiti (primary school, until she died in 1996). Today, the school is run by Chrisanthi Moraiti-Kartali, Giorgos Kasimatis, Antonis Kartalis, and Giorgos Kartalis.

The school proclaims 12 fundamental principles (Dodecalogue, Δωδεκάλογος, Dodekálogos), ranging from religious tolerance to the equivalent of Beckett's "fail again; fail better" premise, as a guide for all its members.

== Academics ==
For their final two years, students at Moraitis can follow either the Greek educational curriculum or the International Baccalaureate programme.

About 16% of Moraitis students achieve a grade of more than 19/20 in the Pan-Hellenic Examinations, with about 50% achieving over 17/20. In 2013, the average grade of Moraitis School IB students was 36/45 (compared to a global average of 29), with two students achieving a grade of 45/45 and five 44/45. The average grade for each subject the school offers was higher than the global average.

The school has a good record in teaching foreign languages, with 74% of examined students earning the Cambridge Certificate of Proficiency in English (compared to a national average of 50%), 88% of examined students earning the Delf B2 exam in French, 88% earning the Zertifikat B2 exam and 100% the Zertifikat C1 in German.

For mathematics, physics and chemistry, students are split into groups according to their ability in these fields during gymnasium. This approach allows teachers to tailor their lessons accordingly. Moraitis School students have performed exceptionally well in mathematics and physics competitions, with its students earning the top awards for the panhellenic mathematics competition every year. In 2013 it was the first school in Greece in mathematics.

== Student activities ==
Sports have always been encouraged and are an important part of the Moraitis School life experience despite the limited athletic facilities available within the school grounds. Its sport teams (football, basketball, volleyball, track and field) have excelled in competitions both within Greece and in Europe.

In addition to sports teams the Moraitis school has a forensics (debating) team that has achieved distinctions in national and international tournaments/competitions. In 2011, three out of the eight students selected from all of Greece during the 23rd National Selection Conference of the European Youth Parliament in Athensto represent Greece in three international conferences of the European Youth Parliament were High school students of the Moraitis School.

School clubs in the Middle School and High School include the UNESCO Club, the Theatre Club, the Comedy Club, the Film Club, the Modern Dance Club, the Science Fiction Club, the Applications of Science Club, the Digital Laboratory Club, the Yoga Club, the Modern Art and Architecture Club, the Music Club, the Musical Band Club, the Photography Club, the Entrepreneurship Club, the Journalism Club, the Environmental Club, the Painting Club, the Photography Club, the Volleyball Club, the Basketball Club, the Soccer Club, the Aerobics Club, the Tennis Club, and the Track and Field Club. The yearbook, Efivos (Έφηβος) is produced by students.

The annual school fair ("Panigiri"). is organised by its high-school students once a year, the Panigiri hosts activities and events in order to raise money for charity. The Panigiri is held on the weekend before the Easter break and hundreds come.

Since 2011 the alumni association of the Moraitis school (SASM) has hosted an annual, two-day alumni fair for charity.

The school has been taking part in the F1 in Schools competition for 3 years. The 2016 team of Moraitis School, Aeolus Racing placed 7th in the 2016 F1 in Schools World Finals, held in Austin, Texas.

== Bullying policy ==
The school was the first school in Greece in 1994 to introduce an anti-bullying policy.

== Tuition and size ==
For the academic year 2025-2026, the tuition ranges from €7,950 (nursery school) to €14,450 (IB Diploma). The school also offers discounts for siblings.

Moraitis School's own scholarship program provides opportunities each year for academically exceptional students from all socioeconomic backgrounds to attend, ensuring access to high-quality education regardless of financial circumstances. Additionally, as part of the Inspired Education group, the school participates in the Nsouli Scholarship Awards, which offer scholarships to children demonstrating outstanding academic performance, as well as exceptional talent in sports or the arts.

== Notable alumni ==
Business

- Takis Arapoglou, Chairman and Governor of the National Bank of Greece
- Petros S. Kokkalis, Businessman, ex-Vice-president Olympiacos F.C., Member of the European Parliament
- Evangelos Mytilineos, Businessman, chairman of Metlen Energy & Metals
- Konstantinos Piladakis, owner and chairman of AEL F.C.
- Leon Patitsas, founder and owner of Atlas Maritime

Academia:

- Demetrios Christodoulou, mathematical physicist

Arts:

- Apostolos Doxiadis, writer and director
- Yorgos Lanthimos, filmmaker and theater director
- Evgenia Manolidou, musician
- Christoforos Papakaliatis, actor, film director, and screenwriter
- Haris Romas, actor, screenwriter, and lyricist

Sports:

- Antigoni Roubessi, Olympian
- Sofoklis Pilavios, ex-president of the Hellenic Football Federation

Politics:

- Yanis Varoufakis, ex-Minister of Finance, professor, director, Hoover fellow, former economist-in-residence at Valve
