= Koomson =

Koomson is a surname. Notable people with the surname include:

- Dorothy Koomson (born 1971), British novelist
- George Kingsley Koomson, Ghanaian judge
- Gilbert Koomson (born 1994), Ghanaian footballer
- Koby Arthur Koomson, Ghanaian diplomat
- Mavis Hawa Koomson (born 1966), Ghanaian politician
- Valencia Koomson, American electrical engineer
