= Marcos Lemos =

Greek shipping magnate and racehorse owner

Captain Marcos Lemos (died 2009) was a Greek shipping magnate and racehorse owner who was an important figure on the racing scene in the 1970s and 1980s. In the 1980s he sold his Warren Park stud farm at Newmarket to Gerald Carroll of the Carroll Group for £7 million. Lemos's horse Julio Mariner won the 1978 St Leger.

== See also ==
- Clive Brittain
- Lemos family
- Costas Lemos
