= Pilkey =

Pilkey is a surname, and may refer to:

- Allan Pilkey, Canadian politician
- Cliff Pilkey, Canadian politician
- Dav Pilkey, children's author
- Orrin H. Pilkey (1934–2024), American marine geologist, Professor of geology at Duke University
- Walter Pilkey, Professor of mechanical engineering at University of Virginia
