= Aggeliki Iliadi =

Aggeliki Iliadi Αγγελική Ηλιάδη
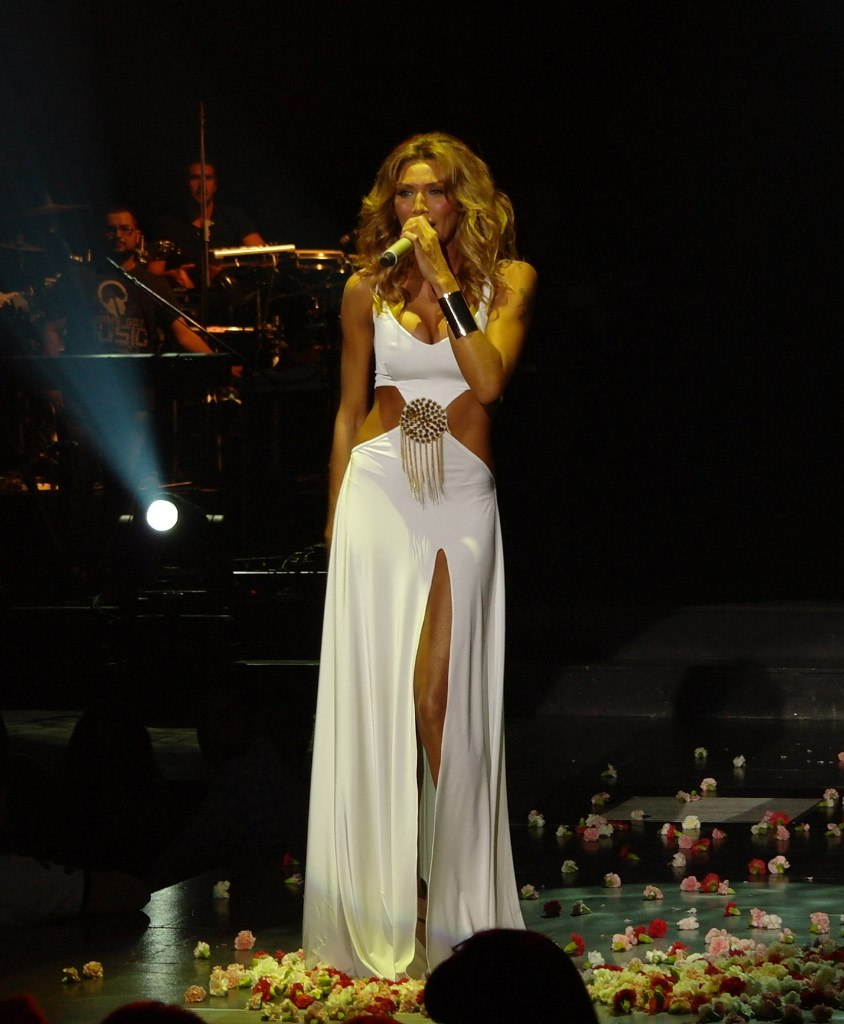

Background information
- Born: 16 September 1977 (age 48); Athens, Greece
- Genres: folk, Ελαφρολαϊκό
- Occupations: Singer, songwriter
- Years active: 1995–present
- Label: Platinum Records

Aggeliki Iliadi (Greek: Αγγελική Ηλιάδη, pronounced [aɲɟeliˌci iliˈaði]; born 16 September 1977) is a Greek folk singer.

== Personal life ==
Born in Athens, Attica, she began dating entrepreneur Babis Lazaridis in 2004, while he was still married. On 3 June 2005, she gave birth to their son, Babis Jr. They were together until his death, in December 2008. From 2013 to 2018, Iliadi was in a relationship with the football player Savvas Gentsoglou and on 8 July 2014, their son Vasilis was born. Iliadi is the granddaughter of Cathy Grey, one of the most popular singers of Greece in the 1950s and 60s.

== Discography ==
=== Studio albums and EPs ===
| Year | Title | Certification | Label |
|---|---|---|---|
| 2003 | Ti Monaksia Fovamai (Τη μοναξιά φοβάμαι) | — | Polydor |
| 2004 | Ena Chrono Mazi (Ένα χρόνο μαζί) | — | Polydor |
| 2005 | Tora Ti Thes? (Τώρα τι θες;) | — | Polydor |
| 2006 | Apofasi Kardias (Απόφαση καρδιάς) | — | Virus Music |
| 2007 | Pote Den Efyges (Ποτέ δεν έφυγες) | Gold | Heaven Music |
| 2009 | Ego Milao Me Tin Kardia Sou (Εγώ μιλάω με την καρδιά μου) | Gold | Heaven Music |
| 2009 | Hamogelo (Χαμογελώ) | — | Heaven Music |
| 2011 | Me Tin Agapi Ta 'Ho Valei (Με την αγάπη τα 'χω βάλει) | — | Heaven Music |

=== Duets ===
| Year | Title | Artist | Label |
|---|---|---|---|
| 1996 | "Ponane" | Cathy Gray | FM Records |
| 2014 | "Mono Auto Zito" | Oge | Panik Platinum |
| 2015 | "Otan Ola Tha Kaigontai" | Paris | Panik Platinum |

=== Collection Hits ===
| Year | Title | Label |
|---|---|---|
| 2010 | Hamogelo Kai Prohorao | Heaven Music |

=== Cover Editions ===
| Year | Title | Label |
|---|---|---|
| 2012 | "Mia Gynaika Mono Xerei" | Panik Platinum |

=== Singles & EPs ===
| Year | Title | Label |
|---|---|---|
| 2012 | "Travmatismene Mou Erota" | Platinum Records |
| 2012 | "Magkia Mou" | Heaven Music |
| 2013 | "Ta Parapona Mou" | Platinum Records |
| 2013 | "1000 Kai 1 Nyhtes" | Platinum Records |
| 2013 | "Kati Antres Paidia" | Platinum Records |
| 2015 | "Tha Ziso Gia Mena" | Panik Platinum |
| 2016 | "Ela Kai Pare Me" | Panik Platinum |
| 2017 | "Oneiro Spasmena" | The Spicy Effect |
| 2018 | "Voutia Sto Keno" | Digital Ray Records |
| 2018 | "Mazi Sou Petao" | Heaven Music |
| 2021 | "Enan Avgousto" | Panik Platinum |
| 2022 | "Me Ta Matia Sou To Leo" | Panik Platinum |

== Filmography ==
=== Film ===
| Year | Title | Role | Notes | Ref. |
|---|---|---|---|---|
| 1998 | Let the women wait | Panos' girlfriend | Film debut | |

=== Television ===
| Year | Title | Role | Notes |
|---|---|---|---|
| 1994-1996 | Ciao Ant1 | Herself (co-host) | Variety comedy talk show |
| 2011 | Dancing with the Stars | Herself (contestant) | Season 2; 2nd runner-up |
| 2013 | Eurosong: A MAD Show | Herself (contestant) | TV special; 3rd place |
| 2020 | Look Here Annita! | Herself (judge) | Weekend trash tv (10 episodes) |
| 2021 | The Bachelor | Herself (guest) | Episode: "Rose Ceremony 11" |
| 2021-2022 | The Farm Greece | Herself (contestant) | Season 4; 25 episodes |
| 2023 | I'm a Celebrity...Get Me Out of Here! | Herself (contestant) | Season 1; 18 episodes |
