= Tryphon Samaras =

Greek hairdresser and television personality

- Τρύφωνας Σαμαράς
- Born: 10 July 1977 (age 48); Athens, Greece
- Citizenship: Greece
- Occupation(s): TV personality, hairdresser, hair stylist
- Years active: 1990–present
- Television: Dancing with the Stars; Just the 2 Of Us

Tryphon Samaras (Greek: Τρύφωνας Σαμαράς) is a Greek hairdresser and television personality.

== Youthful years ==
He was born in Athens, and grew up in Agios Dimitrios, Attica. His parents are Charalambos and Voula Samara.

== Career and important personal moments ==
After graduating from high school, he began his career as a hairdresser in the early 1990s. In 1997, he founded his own business in the centre of Athens. He has been responsible for the hair care of important names in the global television and art industry (Naomi Campbell, Caitlyn Jenner, Kate Moss, Linda Evangelista, Monica Bellucci, Natalia Vodyanova, Carla Bruni, etc. ), as well as in the domestic industry. At the same time, he is the author of two books and has been publishing his own diary for years.

Since the early 2010s, Tryphon Samaras, after becoming known as a hairdresser, has become a TV personality, taking part in many TV shows, reality shows, TV shows and performances.

Starting from friendly appearances on Black Out and Wipe Out in the early 2010s, Tryphon became known and loved by the Greek audience for his humor and his personality. He also participated in Greek version of Dancing with the Stars in 2011, where he was last eliminated (i.e., scored 4th). Then in the same year he participated in the show The Great Laughter School where he gives an exclusive but very revealing interview. Then towards the fall of 2011 came the broadcast station in the career of Fab 5.

== Filmography ==
=== Television ===
Year	Title	Role(s)	Notes	Ref.
2010	Wipe Out Greece	Himself (contestant)	2 episodes	
2011	Dancing with the Stars	Himself (contestant)	3rd runner-up; season 2	
2011	Black Out	Himself (contestant)	Episode: "Celebrity Edition"	
2011-2012	Fab 5	Himself (host)	Makeover reality show	
2013	Hold on tight	Himself (contestant)	Episode #7	
2014	Through This	witness	Episode: "Babis"	
2014	The News of the Stars with Tryfonas Samaras	Himself (anchor)	Monday to Friday evening news on Epsilon TV	
2015	Hair	Himself	2 episodes	
2015	My mum cooks better than yours	Himself (contestant)	1 episode	
2018	Shut up and swim!	Himself (contestant)	7 episodes	
2020	Just the 2 Of Us	Himself (contestant)	2nd runner-up; season 3	
2020	Just the 2 Of Us	Himself (contestant)	8 episodes; season 4	
2020-2022	Style Me Up	Himself (beauty expert)	Daytime makeover reality show	
2023	I'm a Celebrity...Get Me Out of Here!	Himself (contestant)	8 episodes; season 1	
2025	Big Brother Greece	Himself (guest)	Episode 48; season 8	

=== Film ===
Year	Title	Role	Notes	Ref.
1982	Gkomenios the priest	reporter	Film debut	
1987	Fraud! And by the law		video movie	
1987	The Waitresses	Antoine	video movie	
1989	Female students	Takis	video movie	
2012	Larissa Confidential	Himself		
2023	Look who's talking!	Nikos		
