= I'm a Celebrity...Get Me Out of Here! (Greek TV series) =

- Series 1
- Presented by: Giorgos Lianos; Kalomira Sarantis
- No. of days: 40
- No. of castaways: 16
- Winner: Tasos Xiarcho
- Runner-up: Panos Kalidis
- Location: La Romana, Dominican Republic
- No. of episodes: 20

Release
- Original network: Skai TV
- Original release: 11 October – 14 December 2023

I'm a Celebrity...Get Me Out of Here! is a Greek reality television series based on the international franchise with same name, the only season of which was broadcast on Skai TV.

Giorgos Lianos and Kalomira Sarantis hosted the show. The official trailer was released on 29 September. Programme aired two times a week, every Wednesday and Thursday, with first episode premiered on 11 October 2023.

== Celebrities ==
Format began with fourteen celebrity contestants. Tryphon Samaras and Patrick Ogunsoto entered the game as late arrivals.

Celebrity	Known for	Status
Tasos Xiarcho	Dancer	King of the Jungle on 14 December 2023
Panos Kalidis	Singer	Runner-up on 14 December 2023
Nikos Anadiotis	Politician	Eliminated 13th on 13 December 2023
Giorgos Heimonetos	Cyclist	Eliminated 12th on 13 December 2023
Patrick Ogunsoto	Football player	Eliminated 11th on 13 December 2023
Aggeliki Iliadi	Singer	Eliminated 10th on 7 December 2023
Ioanna Lili	Influencer	Eliminated 9th on 6 December 2023
Nikos Vamvakoulas	Football player	Eliminated 8th on 30 November 2023
Bo	Rapper	Eliminated 7th on 23 November 2023
Maria Kalavria	Model	Eliminated 6th on 16 November 2023
Emilia Vodos	TV presenter	Eliminated 5th on 9 November 2023
Tryphon Samaras	TV presenter	Eliminated 4th on 2 November 2023
Stella Georgiadou	Singer	Eliminated 3rd on 26 October 2023
Rahil Makri	Politician	Eliminated 2nd on 19 October 2023
Stamatis Gardelis	Actor	Eliminated 1st on 12 October 2023
Dimitra Alexandraki	Actress	Withdrew on 12 October 2023

#	Episode 2	Episode 4	Episode 6	Episode 8	Episode 10	Episode 12	Episode 14	Episode 16	Episode 17	Episode 18	Episode 19	Episode 20
Tasos	Nominated	Nominated	Safe	Nominated	Safe	Nominated	Safe	Safe	Safe	Nominated	Nominated	Winner
Panos	Safe	Safe	Safe	Safe	Safe	Safe	Nominated	Safe	Safe	Safe	Nominated	Runner-up
Nikos A.	Nominated	Safe	Safe	Safe	Safe	Safe	Nominated	Safe	Nominated	Safe	Nominated	3rd place
Giorgos	Nominated	Safe	Nominated	Safe	Safe	Safe	Safe	Nominated	Safe	Nominated	Nominated	4th place
Patrick	Not in camp				Safe	Safe	Safe	Safe	Nominated	Safe	Nominated	5th place
Aggeliki	Safe	Safe	Safe	Nominated	Nominated	Safe	Safe	Nominated	Safe	Nominated	6th place	
Ioanna	Safe	Safe	Safe	Safe	Safe	Nominated	Safe	Safe	Nominated	7th place		
Nikos V.	Safe	Safe	Nominated	Safe	Nominated	Safe	Safe	Nominated	8th place			
Bo	Safe	Safe	Safe	Safe	Safe	Safe	Nominated	9th place				
Maria	Safe	Safe	Safe	Safe	Safe	Nominated	10th place					
Emilia	Safe	Nominated	Safe	Safe	Nominated	11th place						
Tryphon	Not in camp	Safe	Safe	Nominated	12th place							
Stella	Safe	Safe	Nominated	13th place								
Rahil	Safe	Nominated	14th place									
Stamatis	Nominated	15th place										
Dimitra	Withdrew	16th place										

== Ratings ==
Official ratings are taken from AGB Hellas.

Week	Episode	Air date	Timeslot (EET)	Share	
Week	Episode	Air date	Timeslot (EET)	Household	Adults 18–54
1	1	11 October 2023	Wednesday 10:20pm	11.3%	11.5%
1	2	12 October 2023	Thursday 10:20pm	10%	9.5%
2	3	18 October 2023	Wednesday 10:20pm	8%	9.6%
2	4	19 October 2023	Thursday 10:20pm	7.6%	6.8%
3	5	25 October 2023	Wednesday 10:20pm	5.4%	5.8%
3	6	26 October 2023	Thursday 10:20pm	6.4%	6.4%
4	7	1 November 2023	Wednesday 10:20pm	5.5%	5.8%
4	8	2 November 2023	Thursday 10:20pm	5.9%	5.3%
5	9	8 November 2023	Wednesday 10:20pm	4.1%	4%
5	10	9 November 2023	Thursday 10:20pm	3.9%	5.4%
6	11	15 November 2023	Wednesday 10:20pm	4.1%	4.5%
6	12	16 November 2023	Thursday 10:20pm	3.5%	4.1%
7	13	22 November 2023	Wednesday 10:20pm	7.2%	9.4%
7	14	23 November 2023	Thursday 10:20pm	4.4%	4.4%
8	15	29 November 2023	Wednesday 10:20pm	4.9%	4.3%
8	16	30 November 2023	Thursday 10:20pm	4.1%	4.9%
9	17	6 December 2023	Wednesday 10:20pm	4.9%	6.1%
9	18	7 December 2023	Thursday 10:20pm	3.4%	3.1%
10	19	13 December 2023	Wednesday 10:20pm	3.5%	4.7%
10	20	14 December 2023	Thursday 10:20pm	3.2%	3.2%
