= Kristen Ransom =

African-American engineer, social entrepreneur

Kristen Ransom is an American computer engineer and social entrepreneur. She is the CTO and co-founder of IncluDe Web Design and Development, a web design firm offering affordable services to women- and minority-owned organizations.

== Early life and education ==
Ransom was fascinated with engineering from a young age. In 2017, she told Forbes, "From a really young age I loved to take things apart and put them back together, and I didn't know there was a name for that until members of my family started calling me 'The Engineer'."

She earned a B.S. degree in human-factors engineering from Tufts University. During college, she was president of the institution's chapter of the Society of Black Engineers. Ransom received a Master of Science in Engineering Management in 2018 from the Tufts University School of Engineering. Her business education was supported by a Kauffman Foundation-sponsored boot camp and the Epicenter Community Accelerator program.

== Career ==
Before founding IncluDe, Ransom developed hardware and software for Harley Davidson and the MITRE Corporation.

On IncluDe, Ransom has said, "we’re trying to change the face of tech and make it so everyone's included." After founding IncluDe, Ransom also began appearing as a motivational speaker at events and conferences. In 2017, she was named one of Boston Magazine’s Top 30 Rising Tech Stars. In 2021, she created the website for the Boston "All Inclusive" tourism campaign.
