= Dancing with the Stars (Greek TV series) season 2 =

Dancing with the Stars
- Season 2
- Celebrity winner: Argiris Aggelou
- Professional winner: Emily Matthaiakaki
- No. of episodes: 13

Release
- Original network: ANT1
- Original release: March 20 – June 12, 2011

Season chronology
- ← Previous; Season 1 Next → Season 3

Dancing with the Stars was a Greek reality show airing on ANT1 and filmed live in Athens. The show was based on the United Kingdom BBC Television series Strictly Come Dancing and was part of BBC Worldwide's Dancing with the Stars franchise. The theme song was "It's personal" performed by Swedish indie pop band The Radio Dept. The second season of the show started on March 20, 2011. Season's 1 winner Errika Prezerakou joined the judging panel, replacing Galena Velikova. ANT1 launched a daily spin off titled "Dancing with the Stars Daily" on March 21, hosted by former contestant Eugenia Manolidou. The show was canceled on April due to low ratings.

== Judges ==
- Alexis Kostalas, announcer, sports commentator
- Errika Prezerakou, pole vaulter, Series 1 winner
- Giannis Latsios, ANT1 television program manager
- Fokas Evagelinos, choreographer, dancer, dance teacher

== Couples ==
Celebrity	Occupation	Professional partner	Status
Niki Xanthou	Athlete long jumper	Dimitris Kranias	Eliminated 1st on March 27, 2011
Giorgos Chraniotis	Actor	Tzeni Nikolentzou	Eliminated 2nd on April 3, 2011
Nasos Galakteros	Former Basketball Player	Anna Polyzou	Eliminated 3rd on April 17, 2011
Marietta Chrousala	Fashion model, TV presenter	Thodoris Panagakos	Eliminated 4th on April 24, 2011
Maria Tsouri	Water polo player	Panos Xylas	Eliminated 5th on May 1, 2011
Natassa Kalogridi	Actress	Vaggelis Holevas	Eliminated 6th on May 8, 2011
Giorgos Gerolimatos	Singer	Fotini Papastavrou	Eliminated 7th on May 15, 2011
Natalia Dragoumi	Actress	Yuri Dimitrov	Eliminated 8th on May 22, 2011
Eleonora Meleti	TV presenter, journalist	Elias Ladas	Eliminated 9th on May 29, 2011
Nadia Boule	Actress, singer, TV presenter	Thanos Pisanidis	Eliminated 10th on June 2, 2011
Tryfonas Samaras	Hairstylist	Claudia-Anna Stoyia	Eliminated 11th on June 2, 2011
Aggeliki Iliadi	Singer	Elias Boutsis	Third place on June 5, 2011
Kostas Martakis	Singer	Maria Antimisari	Runner-up on June 12, 2011
Argiris Aggelou	Actor	Emily Matthaiakaki	Winner on June 12, 2011

== Scoring chart ==
Couple	Place	1	2	1+2	3	4	5	6	7	8	9	10	11	12	13
Argiris & Emily	1	27	30	57	32	34	36	37	36	36	36	38+36=74	38+10=48	40+40=80	40+37+38=115
Kostas & Maria	2	26	26	52	31	31	35	36	38	36	36	37+38=75	39+9=48	36+40=76	38+39+38=115
Aggeliki & Elias	3	24	28	52	29	29	33	34	34	33	37	38+38=76	36+7=43	36+40=76	
Tryfonas & Claudia-Anna	4	23	24	47	28	24	27	30	32	30	29	32+36=68	30+6=36		
Nadia & Thanos	5	28	30	58	29	32	36	34	38	36	38	38+38=76	35+8=43		
Eleonora & Elias	6	28	29	57	31	34	36	34	38	36	40	36+36=72			
Natalia & Uri	7	24	28	52	32	31	35	34	36	36	33				
Giorgos & Fotini	8	23	27	50	27	26	26	28	-	25					
Natassa & Vaggelis	9	25	31	56	32	31	33	35	37						
Maria & Panos	10	21	26	47	25	25	28	25							
Marietta & Thodoris	11	22	29	51	29	33	32								
Nasos & Anna	12	26	28	54	30	30									
Giorgos & Tzeni	13	28	-		29										
Niki & Dimitris	14	24	26	50											

Red numbers indicate the lowest score for each week.
Green numbers indicate the highest score for each week.
indicates the couple eliminated that week.
indicates the returning couple that finished in the bottom two.
indicates the winning couple.
indicates the runner-up couple.
indicates the third-place couple.
indicates the couple didn't dance this week.
indicates the couple withdrew.

=== Averages ===
This table only counts for dances scored on a traditional 40-points scale.

Rank by average	Place	Couple	Total points	Number of dances	Average
1	1	Argiris & Emily	611	17	35.9
2	2	Kostas & Maria	600	17	35.3
3	6	Eleonora & Elias	378	11	34.4
4	5	Nadia & Thanos	412	12	34.3
5	3	Aggeliki & Elias	469	14	33.5
6	7	Natalia & Uri	289	9	32.1
7	9	Natassa & Vaggelis	224	7	32.0
8	11	Marietta & Thodoris	145	5	29.0
9	4	Tryfonas & Claudia-Anna	345	12	28.8
10	12	Nasos & Anna	114	4	28.5
10	13	Giorgos & Tzeni	57	2	28.5
12	8	Giorgos & Fotini	182	7	26.0
13	10	Maria & Panos	150	6	25.0
13	14	Niki & Dimitris	50	2	25.0

== Weekly scores ==
Individual judges scores in the chart below (given in parentheses) are listed in this order from left to right: Alexis Kostalas, Errika Prezerakou, Giannis Latsios, Fokas Evaggelinos.

=== Week 1 ===
Running order

Couple	Score	Dance
Marietta & Thodoris	22 (6,6,5,5)	Cha-Cha-Cha
Giorgos & Fotini	23 (7,6,5,5)	Tango
Natalia & Uri	24 (6,6,6,6)	Cha-Cha-Cha
Kostas & Maria	26 (6,7,7,6)	Tango
Niki & Dimitris	24 (6,6,6,6)	Cha-Cha-Cha
Giorgos & Tzeni	28 (7,7,7,7)	Tango
Aggeliki & Elias	24 (6,6,6,6)	Cha-Cha-Cha
Nasos & Anna	26 (7,6,6,7)	Tango
Nadia & Thanos	28 (7,7,7,7)	Cha-Cha-Cha
Argiris & Emily	27 (7,7,6,7)	Tango
Maria & Panos	21 (5,6,5,5)	Cha-Cha-Cha
Natassa & Vaggelis	25 (6,6,7,6)	Cha-Cha-Cha
Tryfonas & Claudia-Anna	23 (6,6,5,6)	Tango
Eleonora & Elias	28 (7,7,7,7)	Cha-Cha-Cha

=== Week 2 ===
Running order

Couple	Score	Dance
Aggeliki & Elias	28 (7,7,7,7)	Viennese Waltz
Nasos & Anna	28 (7,7,7,7)	Jive
Niki & Dimitris	26 (6,7,7,6)	Viennese Waltz
Kostas & Maria	26 (6,7,6,7)	Jive
Natalia & Uri	28 (7,7,7,7)	Viennese Waltz
Giorgos & Fotini	27 (7,7,7,6)	Jive
Maria & Panos	26 (6,7,7,6)	Viennese Waltz
Eleonora & Elias	29 (7,7,7,8)	Viennese Waltz
Argiris & Emily	30 (7,8,7,8)	Jive
Natassa & Vaggelis	31 (8,8,8,7)	Viennese Waltz
Tryfonas & Claudia-Anna	24 (6,7,5,6)	Jive
Nadia & Thanos	30 (8,8,7,7)	Viennese Waltz
Marietta & Thodoris	29 (7,8,7,7)	Viennese Waltz

=== Week 3 ===
Running order

Couple	Score	Dance
Argiris & Emily	32 (8,8,8,8)	Quickstep
Eleonora & Elias	31 (8,8,7,8)	Rumba
Giorgos & Tzeni	29 (7,7,8,7)	Quickstep
Marietta & Thodoris	29 (7,7,8,7)	Rumba
Giorgos & Fotini	27 (7,7,6,7)	Quickstep
Natassa & Vaggelis	32 (8,8,8,8)	Rumba
Kostas & Maria	31 (7,8,8,8)	Quickstep
Natalia & Uri	32 (8,8,8,8)	Rumba
Tryfonas & Claudia-Anna	28 (7,8,6,7)	Quickstep
Nadia & Thanos	29 (7,7,7,8)	Rumba
Aggeliki & Elias	29 (7,7,8,7)	Rumba
Nasos & Anna	30 (7,8,7,8)	Quickstep
Maria & Panos	25 (6,6,7,6)	Rumba

=== Week 4 ===
Running order

Couple	Score	Dance
Nadia & Thanos	32 (8,8,8,8)	Foxtrot
Kostas & Maria	31 (8,7,8,8)	Paso Doble
Maria & Panos	25 (6,6,7,6)	Foxtrot
Giorgos & Fotini	26 (7,7,6,6)	Paso Doble
Aggeliki & Elias	29 (7,7,8,7)	Foxtrot
Nasos & Anna	30 (8,7,8,7)	Paso Doble
Natassa & Vaggelis	31 (7,7,9,8)	Foxtrot
Tryfonas & Claudia-Anna	24 (7,6,5,6)	Paso Doble
Marietta & Thodoris	33 (8,9,8,8)	Foxtrot
Natalia & Uri	31 (8,7,8,8)	Foxtrot
Argiris & Emily	34 (9,8,9,8)	Paso Doble
Eleonora & Elias	34 (9,8,8,9)	Foxtrot

=== Week 5 ===
Running order

Couple	Score	Style
Marietta & Thodoris	32 (8,8,8,8)	Free-Style
Argiris & Emily	36 (9,9,9,9)	Free-Style
Natassa & Vaggelis	33 (8,8,9,8)	Free-Style
Maria & Panos	28 (7,8,6,7)	Free-Style
Tryfonas & Claudia-Anna	27 (7,8,6,6)	Free-Style
Natalia & Uri	35 (8,9,9,9)	Free-Style
Kostas & Maria	35 (9,9,8,9)	Free-Style
Eleonora & Elias	36 (9,9,9,9)	Free-Style
Aggeliki & Elias	33 (8,8,9,8)	Free-Style
Giorgos & Fotini	26 (7,6,6,7)	Free-Style
Nadia & Thanos	36 (9,9,9,9)	Free-Style

=== Week 6 ===
Running order

Couple	Score	Style
Maria & Panos	25 (7,6,6,6)	Samba
Tryfonas & Claudia-Anna	30 (8,8,7,7)	Waltz
Nadia & Thanos	34 (9,8,9,8)	Samba
Aggeliki & Elias	34 (8,9,9,8)	Samba
Kostas & Maria	36 (9,9,9,9)	Waltz
Eleonora & Elias	34 (9,8,8,9)	Samba
Giorgos & Fotini	28 (7,7,7,7)	Waltz
Natalia & Uri	34 (9,8,9,8)	Samba
Argiris & Emily	37 (9,10,9,9)	Waltz
Natassa & Vaggelis	35 (9,8,9,9)	Samba

=== Week 7 ===
Running order

Couple	Score	Style
Aggeliki & Elias	34 (8,9,9,8)	Jive
Kostas & Maria	38 (9,10,10,9)	Mambo
Eleonora & Elias	38 (10,10,9,9)	Jive
Natalia & Uri	36 (9,9,9,9)	Jive
Argiris & Emily	36 (9,9,9,9)	Mambo
Natassa & Vaggelis	37 (9,9,10,9)	Jive
Tryfonas & Claudia-Anna	32 (8,8,8,8)	Mambo
Nadia & Thanos	38 (9,10,10,9)	Jive

=== Week 8 ===
Running order

Couple	Score	Style
Giorgos & Fotini	25 (6,7,6,6)	Free-Style
Nadia & Thanos	36 (9,9,9,9)	Free-Style
Kostas & Maria	36 (9,9,9,9)	Free-Style
Natalia & Uri	36 (9,9,9,9)	Free-Style
Tryfonas & Claudia-Anna	30 (8,8,7,7)	Free-Style
Aggeliki & Elias	33 (8,9,8,8)	Free-Style
Eleonora & Elias	36 (9,9,9,9)	Free-Style
Argiris & Emily	36 (9,9,9,9)	Free-Style

=== Week 9 ===
Running order

Couple	Score	Style
Tryfonas & Claudia-Anna	29 (7,8,7,7)	Cha-Cha-Cha
Natalia & Uri	33 (8,8,8,9)	Argentine Tango
Argiris & Emily	36 (9,9,9,9)	Cha-Cha-Cha
Eleonora & Elias	40 (10,10,10,10)	Argentine Tango
Nadia & Thanos	38 (9,10,10,9)	Argentine Tango
Kostas & Maria	36 (9,9,9,9)	Cha-Cha-Cha
Aggeliki & Elias	37 (9,10,9,9)	Argentine Tango

=== Week 10 ===
Running order

Couple	Score	Style
Aggeliki & Elias	38 (9,10,10,9)	Samba
Kostas & Maria	37 (9,10,9,9)	Tango
Nadia & Thanos	38 (9,9,10,10)	Rumba
Argiris & Emily	38 (9,10,9,10)	Quickstep
Eleonora & Elias	36 (9,9,9,9)	Rumba
Tryfonas & Claudia-Anna	32 (8,8,8,8)	Mambo

Cha-Cha-Cha Challenge

Couple	Score
Team A (Aggeliki & Elias, Kostas & Maria, Nadia & Thanos)	38 (10,10,9,9)
Team B (Argiris & Emily, Eleonora & Elias, Tryfonas & Claudia-Anna)	36 (9,9,9,9)

=== Week 11 (Thursday) ===
Running order

Couple	Score	Style
Nadia & Thanos	35 (9,9,9,8)	Free-Style
Aggeliki & Elias	36 (9,9,9,9)	Free-Style
Tryfonas & Claudia-Anna	30 (7,8,8,7)	Free-Style
Argiris & Emily	38 (9,10,10,9)	Free-Style
Kostas & Maria	39 (9,10,10,10)	Free-Style

Rock n' Roll Marathon

Couple	Score
Argiris & Emily	10
Kostas & Maria	9
Nadia & Thanos	8
Aggeliki & Elias	7
Tryfonas & Claudia-Anna	6

In this live show two competitors were eliminated

=== Semi-final ===
Running order

Couple	Score	Style
Kostas & Maria	36 (9,9,9,9)	Paso Doble
Kostas & Maria	40 (10,10,10,10)	Jive
Aggeliki & Elias	36 (9,9,9,9)	Foxtrot
Aggeliki & Elias	40 (10,10,10,10)	Argentine Tango
Argiris & Emily	40 (10,10,10,10)	Tango
Argiris & Emily	40 (10,10,10,10)	Jive

=== Final ===
Running order

Couple	Score	Style
Argiris & Emily	40 (10,10,10,10)	Waltz
Argiris & Emily	37 (9,10,9,9)	Mambo
Argiris & Emily	38 (10,9,9,10)	Free-Style
Kostas & Maria	38 (9,10,10,9)	Waltz
Kostas & Maria	39 (10,10,9,10)	Mambo
Kostas & Maria	38 (10,9,10,9)	Free-Style

Παίξε το μετά το KUM-BA-YAH (Σελ. 11)

== Guest stars ==
#	Live Show	Guest	Occupation	Professional partner	Style
1	7	Spyros Soulis	Architect, TV presenter	Anna Polyzou	Jive
2	8	Tamta	Singer	Thodoris Panagakos	Tango
3	9	Nikki Ponte	Singer	Panos Xylas	Quickstep
4	10	Eugenia Manolidou	Classical composer and conductor, TV presenter	Vaggelis Holevas	Cha-Cha-Cha
5	11	Tzeni Balatsinou	Former fashion model	Vaggelis Holevas	Mambo
6	12	Mairi Sinatsaki	Journalist and Host of Green Room	Uri Dimitrov	Cha-Cha-Cha
7	12	Dimitris Vlachos and Savvas Poumpouras	Actor, Athlete and TV presenter, Radio Producer	Fotini Papastavrou and Anna Polyzou	Rock n' Roll
8	13	Errika Prezerakou	Pole vaulter, Series 1 winner and Current Judge	Ankly Viskara	Mambo
9	13	Ivi Adamou	Singer	Uri Dimitrov	Rumba
10	13	Kalomoira	Singer	Thanos Pisanidis and Group	Musical

Παίξε το μετά το ΧΟΡΟΣ ΤΟΥ 18ου ΑΙΩΝΑ (Σελ. 13)

== Ratings ==
#	Episode	Airdate	Share	Viewers (in millions)	Rank (Daily)	Rank (Weekly)
0	Film live show	March 13, 2011	31.9%	2.000	1	5
1	Live show 1	March 20, 2011 20-M-11	41.9%	1.992	1	7
2	Live show 2	March 27, 2011	43.4%	1.893	1	8
3	Live show 3	April 3, 2011	39.5%	1.715	1	9
4	Live show 4	April 17, 2011	39.3%	1.735	1	8
5	Live show 5	April 24, 2011	43.4%	1.440	1	4
6	Live show 6	May 1, 2011	38.4%	1.643	1	6
7	Live show 7	May 8, 2011	44.6%	1.941	1	7
8	Live show 8	May 15, 2011	42.1%	1.768	1	9
9	Live show 9	May 22, 2011	39.6%	1.569	1	8
10	Live show 10	May 29, 2011	43.6%	1.838	1	6
11	Live show 11	June 2, 2011	37.8%	1.595	1	3
12	Live show 12 (semi-final)	June 5, 2011	34.5%	1.406	1	4
13	Live show 13 (final)	June 12, 2011	48.8%	1.647	1	2

Παίξε το μετ΄το Ο ΓΕΡΟΝΤΑΚΟΣ (Σελ. 15)
