= Dancing with the Stars (Greek TV series) season 1 =

Dancing with the Stars
- Season 1
- Celebrity winner: Errika Prezerakou
- Professional winner: Thodoris Panagakos
- No. of episodes: 13

Release
- Original network: ANT1
- Original release: March 28 – June 20, 2010

Season chronology
- Next → Season 2

Dancing with the Stars is a Greek reality show airing on ANT1 and filmed live in Athens. The show is based on the United Kingdom BBC Television series Strictly Come Dancing and is part of BBC Worldwide's Dancing with the Stars franchise. The theme song is "It's personal" performed by Swedish indie pop band The Radio Dept. The first season of the show was in spring 2010.

== Judges ==
- Alexis Kostalas, announcer, sports commentator
- Galena Velikova, choreographer, dancer, dance teacher
- Giannis Latsios, ANT1 television program manager
- Fokas Evagelinos, choreographer, dancer, dance teacher

== Couples ==
Celebrity	Occupation	Professional partner	Status
Vicky Koulianou	Model, actress	Elias Boutsis	Eliminated 1st on 4 April 2010
Fotini Pipili	Journalist, Politician	Dimitris Kranias	Eliminated 2nd on 11 April 2010
Kostas Sommer	Actor	Tzeni Nikolentzou	Eliminated 3rd on 18 April 2010
Hrysopiyi Devetzi	Athlete	Panagiotis Grammatikos	Eliminated 4th on 25 April 2010
Patritsia Peristeri	Actress	Alexandros Papadopoulos	Eliminated 5th on 9 May 2010
Dimitris Vlachos	Actor, Athlete	Maria Antimisari	Eliminated 6th on 16 May 2010
Savvas Poumpouras	TV presenter, Radio Producer	Emily Matthaiakaki	Eliminated 7th on 23 May 2010
Michalis Zambidis	Kickboxer, Martial Artist	Anna Polyzou	Eliminated 8th on 30 May 2010
Stamatis Gardelis	Actor	Efi Giannaraki	Eliminated 9th on 6 June 2010
Eugenia Manolidou	classical composer and conductor, TV presenter	Elias Ladas	Third Place on 13 June 2010
Matthildi Maggira	Actress	Richard Szilagyi	Runner-up on 20 June 2010
Errika Prezerakou	Pole vaulter	Thodoris Panagakos	Winner on 20 June 2010

== Scoring chart ==
Couple	Place	1	2	3	4	5	6	7	8	9	10	11	12
Errika & Thodoris	1	21	25	31	33	35	34	36	35+36=71	30+26=56	38+38=76	37+40=77	39+40+40=119
Matthildi & Richard	2	22	-	28	33	36	33	37	36+38=74	29+29=58	40+40=80	36+40=76	40+40+38=118
Eugenia & Elias L.	3	19	31	30	34	34	36	36	31+36=67	28+28=56	40+36=76	36+40=76	
Stamatis & Efi	4	20	24	32	36	31	32	32	34+39=73	24+27=51	36+36=72		
Michalis & Anna	5	16	28	30	30	32	32	32	36+32=68	26+25=51			
Savvas & Emily	6	16	28	31	30	31	35	36	32+37=69				
Dimitris & Maria	7	19	30	29	24	34	30	34					
Patritsia & Alexandros	8	18	23	28	30	33	27						
Hrysopiyi & Panagiotis	9	20	27	28	30	32							
Kostas & Tzeni	10	20	-	29	32								
Fotini & Dimitri	11	17	22	23									
Vicky & Elias B.	12	18	23										

Red numbers indicate the lowest score for each week.
Green numbers indicate the highest score for each week.
indicates the couple eliminated that week.
indicates the returning couple that finished in the bottom two.
indicates the winning couple.
indicates the runner-up couple.
indicates the third-place couple.
indicates the couple didn't dance this week.
indicates the couple withdrew.
recap episode.

Rank by average	Place	Couple	Average
2	1	Errika & Thodoris	35.6
1	2	Matthildi & Richard	36.6
3	3	Eugenia & Elias L.	34.7
4	4	Stamatis & Efi	32.8
6	5	Michalis & Anna	31.0
5	6	Savvas & Emily	31.2
7	7	Dimitris & Maria	29.4
10	8	Patritsia & Alexandros	27.5
9	9	Hrysopiyi & Panagiotis	28.8
8	10	Kostas & Tzeni	29.3
12	11	Fotini & Dimitri	22.7
11	12	Vicky & Elias B.	23.5

- In episode 1 there were three judges (Alexis Kostalas was not present) and also no elimination.
- In episode 2 both Matthildi & Richard and Kostas & Tzeni didn't dance.
- In episode 3 Matthildi & Richard and Kostas & Tzeni fall two places on the scoring chart because they didn't dance on the previous show.
- Episode 6 was the recap episode.
- In episode 9 there were three judges (Fokas Evaggelinos was not present).

== Ratings ==
#	Episode	Airdate	Share	Viewers (000)	Rank (Daily)	Rank (Weekly)
1	Live show 1	28 March 2010	33,2%	1467	1	12
2	Live show 2	4 April 2010	27.6%	933	1	19
3	Live show 3	11 April 2010	31.4%	1414	1	11
4	Live show 4	18 April 2010	36,0%	1670	1	11
5	Live show 5	25 April 2010	39,9%	1710	1	5
6	Episode 6: Recap Episode Top 8	2 May 2010	27,1%	1116	1	20
7	Live show 7	9 May 2010	35,2%	1579	1	7
8	Live show 8	16 May 2010	39,8%	1754	1	4
9	Live show 9	23 May 2010	40,3%	1525	1	11
10	Live show 10	30 May 2010	38,8%	1584	1	11
11	Live show 11	6 June 2010	41,1%	1757	1	7
12	Live show 12 (semi-final)	13 June 2010	46,2%	1704	1	8
13	Live show 13 (final)	20 June 2010	48,7%	1773	1	2
