= Michael Lemos =

London-based Greek heir (born 1955)

Michael Lemos Μιχάλης Λεμός
- Born: May 30, 1955 (age 71); Oinousses, Chios, Greece
- Occupation: Shipping
- Board member of: Owner of C.M. Lemos

Michael Constantine Lemos (born May 1955) is a London-based Greek heir, who inherited the shipping company CM Lemos from his father Constantinos Lemos.

Michael Constantine Lemos was born in May 1955.

Lemos and his two sisters inherited £1.1 billion from their father. In the 2014 Sunday Times Rich List, Lemos had a net worth of £605 million.

== See also ==
- Lemos family
