= Walter Pilkey =

American mechanical engineer

Walter Pilkey (1936–2007) was a professor of mechanical engineering at the University of Virginia. He earned his PhD from Penn State.

== Research ==
His areas of professional interest included crash safety, shock and computational mechanics. He wrote or co-authored more than 30 books and 300 professional articles. He founded Shock and Vibration, a journal published in association with SAVIAC and the limited distribution journal Critical Technology in Shock and Vibration, also in association with SAVIAC. He was the editor-in-chief of the International Journal of Finite Elements in Analysis and Design.

Pilkey was a Fellow of the American Society of Mechanical Engineers.

== Selected publications ==
- Pilkey, Walter, Formulas for Stress, Strain, and Structural Matrices, Wiley, 2nd edition (November 11, 2004), ISBN 0-471-03221-2, ISBN 978-0-471-03221-2
- Pilkey, Walter, Pilkey, Deborah, Peterson's Stress Concentration Factors, Wiley, 3rd edition (January 14, 2008), ISBN 0-470-04824-7, ISBN 978-0-470-04824-5
- Pilkey, Walter, Analysis and Design of Elastic Beams: Computational Methods, Wiley, (June 3, 2002), ISBN 0-471-38152-7, ISBN 978-0-471-38152-5
