= Marietta Chrousala =

Greek model (born 1983)

- Born: Maria Chrousala; March 11, 1983 (age 43); Rizari, Greece
- Other name: Marietta Chrousala Patitsa
- Height: 5 ft 10 in (1.78 m)
- Spouse: Leon Patitsas (m. 2010)
- Children: 3
- Website: www.mariettachrousala.com

Marietta Chrousala (Greek: Μαριέττα Χρουσαλά: born March 11, 1983) is a Greek entrepreneur, former model, tv host and beauty pageant titleholder. She is the founder of the Marietta Chrousala Collection, a line of handmade leather sandals inspired by ancient Greek motifs.

She has appeared on the covers of various fashion magazines and walked the runway for several Greek and international designers. In addition to her modeling career, she has had a presence on Greek television, co-hosting the game show Poly tin Kyriaki on Mega Channel (2005-2006), and presenting the morning show I Ellada Pezi on Alter Channel (2006-2009).

In 2003, Marietta was crowned Star Hellas (Miss Greece) title and represented Greece at the Miss Universe Pageant, where she placed among the Top 15 finalists.

== Early life ==
Chrousala was born on March 11, 1983, in Rizari, a village near Edessa to Kostas and Aglaia Chrousalas, both teachers. She has an older brother, Thanasis (born 1980). The family relocated to Athens In 1985, where she later graduated from 3rd Chaidari High School in 1999.

She earned a Bachelor of Science degree in Mass Media and Communication from the National and Kapodistrian University of Athens in 2004, and a Master’s Degree in Psychology of Communication from Panteion University in 2006.

== Career ==
=== Modeling ===
Marietta has appeared in publications including Vogue Greece, Elle, Madame Figaro, Esquire, Marie Claire, Cosmopolitan Italy, and InStyle. She has walked the runway for designers such as Celia Kritharioti, Michalis Aslanis, Max Mara Bridal, and Mary Katrantzou. Her commercial work includes campaigns for brands like Seventeen Cosmetics, Lancôme, and La Prairie.

=== Television ===
- Co-host, Poly tin Kyriaki (Mega Channel, 2005-2006)
- Host, I Ellada Pezi (Alter Channel, 2006-2009)
- Contestant, Dancing with the Stars Greece (2011)
- Presenter, MadWalk – The Fashion Music Project (Mega Channel, 2012)

=== Author ===
In 2011, Marietta co-authored a cookbook with her mother titled Apo Mitera Se Kori (From Mother to Daughter).

=== Olympic Games Involvement ===
Marietta began volunteering for the Athens 2004 Olympic Games as early as 2002, contributing to planning and organizational efforts.

In January 2004, she was selected to present the official summer uniform for torchbearers at a press event hosted by ATHENS 2004, President Gianna Angelopoulos-Daskalaki.

That summer, she participated in the Olympic Torch Relay, carrying the flame during its journey through Greece. During the Games, she served as VIP hospitality coordinator for the boxing events, where she welcomed guests and dignitaries.

== Other projects ==
=== Business ===
In 2012, Chrousala decided to set up her own business with handmade sandals based on the ancient Greek element. The office of mariettasfantasy is located in London.

== Personal life ==
On June 5, 2010, Chrousala married Greek shipowner Leon Patitsas after four years of relationship. They have three children: a daughter Margo Patitsa (born October 24, 2012) and two sons Spyros Patitsas (born March 4, 2015) and Konstantinos Patitsas (born January 6, 2018).

Chrousala and Patitsas live between Athens, London and Miami. They are close friends with Maria Menounos and Kalomira.

== Television ==
Television
Year	Title	Role	Notes
2003	ANT1's Beauty Pageant	Herself	Contestant - Star Hellas
2005-2006	Poly Tin Kiriaki	Herself	Co-host
2006-2009	I Ellada Paizei	Herself	Host
2011	Dancing with the Stars (Greece season 2)	Herself	Contestant - 11th place
2012	MadWalk – The Fashion Music Project	Herself	Presenter
