= Rizari =

Rizari Ριζάρι
- Community
- Location within Greece
- Coordinates: 40°48′N 22°3′E
- Country: Greece
- Administrative region: Central Macedonia
- Regional unit: Pella
- Municipality: Edessa
- Municipal unit: Edessa
- Elevation: 80 m (260 ft)

Population (2021)
  - Community: 896
- Time zone: UTC+2 (EET)
  - Summer (DST): UTC+3 (EEST)
- Postal code: 590108
- Area code: 23810
- Vehicle registration: ΕΕ

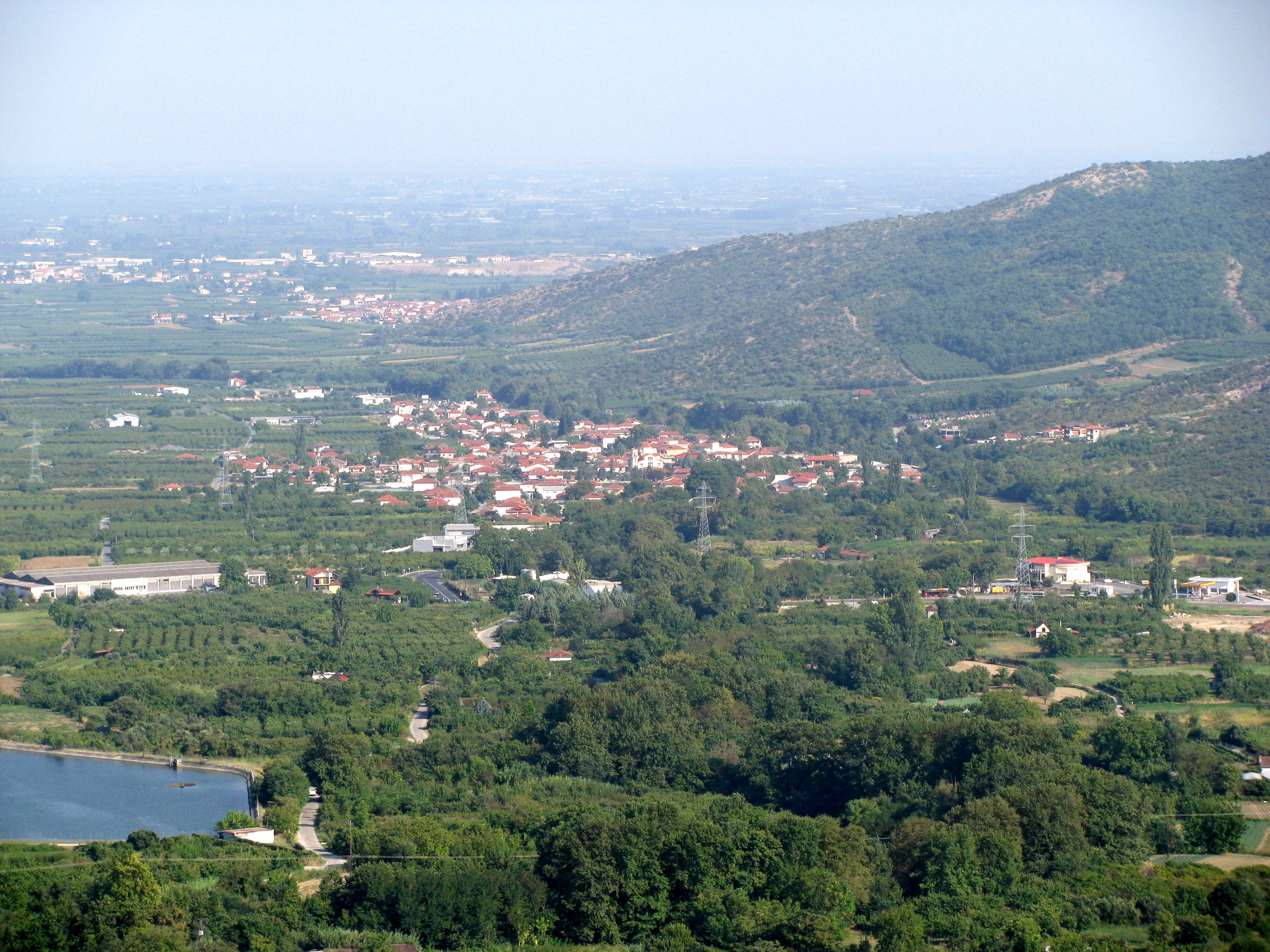
Village of Rizari/Orizari, Aegean Macedonia, Greece

Rizari is a village in the municipality of Edessa, Greece. Rizari is 7 kilometres (4.3 mi) from the city center of Edessa, and 85 kilometres (53 mi) west of Thessaloniki.

== Notable people ==
- Marietta Chrousala (1983 - ) - fashion model and television presenter
