= Kristen Wendell =

American engineering educator

Kristen Bethke Wendell is an American scholar of engineering education. She is a professor of mechanical engineering and education at Tufts University, where she co-directs the Institute for Research on Learning and Instruction in the Tufts University School of Engineering. A major theme of her research has been the integration of engineering engineering into the elementary school curriculum.

== Education and career ==
Wendell has a 2003 bachelor's degree from Princeton University, in mechanical and aerospace engineering. Initially intending to continue in aerospace engineering, she received a 2005 master's degree in aeronautics and astronautics from the Massachusetts Institute of Technology, with research on spacesuit design. After changing her focus to engineering education, she completed her Ph.D. at Tufts University in 2011, working under the supervision of Chris Rogers.

Next, Wendell became an assistant professor at the University of Massachusetts Boston, in 2011. She returned to Tufts as an assistant professor in 2016. As an assistant professor at Tufts, she also held the title of McDonnell Family Professor in Engineering Education. In 2026, she was promoted to full professor.

== Recognition ==
Wendell was a 2013 recipient of the Presidential Early Career Award for Scientists and Engineers, honored "for her outstanding research work on how to integrate a community-based engineering design model into pre-service science elementary school teachers focused on crosscutting concepts, disciplinary core ideas, and scientific and engineering practices".
