= Errika Prezerakou =

Greek pole vaulter (born 1975)

Personal information
- Nationality: Greek
- Born: 8 March 1975 (age 51) Nea Filadelfeia, Greece

Sport
- Country: Greece
- Sport: Athletics
- Event: Pole vault

Achievements and titles
- Personal best: pole vault: 4.25 m (2003)

Errika Prezerakou (Greek: Έρρικα Πρεζεράκου, born 8 March 1975 in Nea Filadelfeia) is a former Greek pole vaulter.

== Biography ==
Her personal best was 4.25 metres, a height she cleared both outdoor (in Athens 2003) and indoor (in Paiania, 2003). She qualified for the Olympic Games of Athens 2004, but did not compete due to a serious leg injury. Her career was interrupted in 2007 due to another serious injury while preparing for the 2008 Olympic Games in Beijing.

In 2010, she won the Greek reality show Dancing with the Stars. She was also a judge for the second edition. In 2020, she is a contestant of the third season of the Greek talent show Just the 2 of Us.

== Progression ==
=== Outdoor ===
Season	Performance	Place	Data	World Rank
2007	4.15	(Greece) Ellinikon	11/05/2007	
2003	4.25	(Greece) Athens	04/05/2003	54º
2002	4.15	(Greece) Athens	22/06/2002	
2001	4.05	(Greece) Athens	17/06/2001	
2000	3.85	(Greece) Athens	20/05/2000	

=== Indoor ===
Season	Performance	Place	Data	World Rank
2008	4.20	(Greece) Paiania	09/02/2008	
2007	4.10	(Greece) Piraeus	21/02/2007	
2006	3.90	(Greece) Piraeus	21/01/2006	
2003	4.25	(Greece) Piraeus	06/03/2003	34º
2002	4.10	(Greece) Piraeus	10/02/2002	
2001	4.00	(Greece) Piraeus	10/02/2001	
