= Tiago Lemos =

Portuguese footballer

Tiago Nuno Amaral Da Silva Lemos (born 26 September 1979), known as Tiago Lemos, is a Portuguese former professional footballer who played as a midfielder.
