= Costas Lemos =

Greek shipping tycoon

Constantinos Lemos Κωνσταντίνος Λεμός
- Born: 1910; Oinousses, Chios, Greece
- Died: 1995 (aged 84–85)
- Occupation: Shipping
- Board member of: Owner of N.S. Lemos & Co. Ltd
- Children: Michael Lemos and two daughters

Constantinos Michael "Costas" Lemos (1910–1995) was a Greek billionaire shipping tycoon, who created the shipping company CM Lemos.

In 1969, Lemos was the wealthiest of the Greek shipowners, worth $750 million, with a fleet of 60 vessels.

By 1980, Lemos was the third largest shipowner in Greece. He later sold most of his vessels and moved into property, tourism and insurance. In 1992, he resided in Lausanne, Switzerland.

On his death in 1995, his son Michael Lemos and his two daughters inherited £1.1 billion from their father.

== See also ==
- Lemos family
