= Leon Patitsas =

English born Greek shipowner

- Born: Leon Patitsas; 1976 (age 49–50); London, England
- Education: Campion High School; Moraitis School
- Alma mater: Tufts University, MIT
- Occupation: Shipowner
- Known for: Founder and owner, Atlas Maritime
- Spouse: Marietta Chrousala (m. 2010)
- Children: 3
- Relatives: Philimon Patitsas (brother)

Leon Patitsas (Greek: Λέων Πατίτσας; born 1976) is an English-Greek shipowner and founder of Atlas Maritime.

== Biography ==
Leon Patitsas was born in February 1976, in London, the son of Spyridon "Spyros" Patitsas, a naval architect from Lefkada, Greece and Marigo Lemou-Patitsa, who is the daughter of Captain Leon C. Lemos. Patitsas has an older brother, Philimon Patitsas.

Patitsas educated at Moraitis School, a private school in Athens, followed by a degree in Mechanical Engineering from Tufts University, Boston. and a Master of Science from MIT.

Patitsas founded Atlas Maritime in 2004.

== Personal life ==
In 2006, Patitsas began dating Marietta Chrousala, a Greek fashion model and TV presenter. They married on 5 June 2010, and have three children together.

Their wedding party took place aboard the Greek cruiser Georgios Averof, a famous war memorial, causing a scandal regarding how permission could have been granted for such an event.

In 2013, Patitsas bought a loft apartment in New York City for $5.5 million.
