= Atlas Maritime =

Atlas Maritime Ltd.
- Company type: Private
- Industry: Shipping, Oil Transportation and Commodities Transportation
- Founded: (2004)
- Founder: Leon Patitsas
- Headquarters: Athens, Greece
- Area served: Worldwide
- Key people: Leon Patitsas (CEO); Christos Zenios (Managing Director); Harris Takakis (Legal Counsel)
- Products: Oil tankers, dry bulkers
- Number of employees: 285 (2017)
- Website: Atlas Maritime

Atlas Maritime is an international shipping company with a fleet of oil tankers, PCTCs, and gas carriers. It was founded in 2004 by Leon Patitsas who is also the CEO.

== The Company ==
Atlas Maritime operates a large fleet of tankers that primarily transport crude oil and refined products. It maintains long-term contracts with ExxonMobil, Chevron, Phillips 66, BP, Shell, and traders such as Trafigura, Glencore (ST Shipping), and Vitol.

== Fleet ==
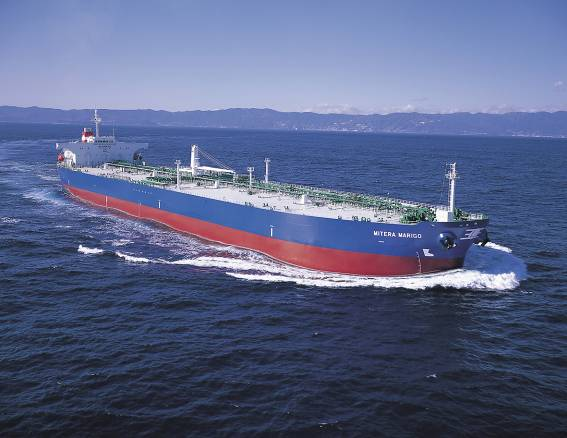
The Mitera Marigo from Atlas Maritime's fleet.

Atlas Maritime has made major investments in recent years amounting to $1.35 billion to modernise the fleet and reduce fuel consumption and emissions. With targeted vessel orders starting in Q4 2020, it has replaced the 17 older vessels in its fleet with 20 new Aframax class tankers, PCTC and Suezmax Super-Eco technology vessels, which achieve a 30% reduction in fuel consumption and pollutants.

In addition, in 2022 & 2023 it placed an order for four PCTC vehicle carrier vessels at a cost of approximately $85 million each.

In 2024, the company placed an order for 3 VLAC ammonia carriers worth a total of $324 million from South Korean HD Hyundai Heavy Industries, which are expected to be delivered in stages from March to December 2027.

Atlas Maritime's fleet consists of 20 vessels of different categories such as Tankers, Car Car Carriers (PCTC) and Ammonia Carriers (VLAC) with 15 of them under construction.

== History ==
The Lemos family is a prominent Greek ship-owning family which has been involved in shipping since the 18th century. From 1860 to 1914 the family owned 52 vessels. Whilst their first vessels were general cargo, the family expanded their interests over the years into bulk carriers and tankers.

Throughout the 20th century, the family continued to charter, sell, and purchase vessels of various types. In the two centuries of its operation, the Patitsas-Lemos family has managed over 100 ships developing a wide network of industry contacts.

In 1905 Christos M. Lemos purchased, together with other prominent Oinoussian families, the family's first steamer: the 2,339 gross ton “Marietta Ralli”. Christos M. Lemos, who also became the first captain of the steamer, continued to build the fleet through the purchases of s/s “Triaina” and s/s “Efploia”.

His sons, including Captain Leon Lemos, further expanded the shipping business by co-founding the London-based company “Lemos & Pateras” in 1937. In recognition of their contribution in World War II and as compensation for the losses they suffered, the family, in 1947, bought the “Hellas”, one of the hundred newly available Liberty ships. Captain Leon Lemos became a prominent Greek shipowner in the 1970s and 1980s, building up a fleet of 17 vessels.

Captain Leon Lemos was the father of Mrs. Marigo Patitsas-Lemos, and the grandfather of Leon and Philemon Patitsas. Their father Spyros Patitsas entered the family business in 1968.
