= Valencia Koomson =

American engineering professor

- Born: Washington, D.C., United States
- Education: Massachusetts Institute of Technology; University of Cambridge
- Awards: Senior Member of the IEEE, Dr. Martin Luther King Jr. Visiting Professorship, National Science Foundation CAREER Award, Marshall Scholarship
- Scientific career
- Fields: Electrical Engineering, Computer Engineering, Biomedical Imaging
- Workplaces: Tufts University, Howard University, University of Cambridge, Massachusetts Institute of Technology
- Thesis: Integrated Circuit Design for Wireless Network Receivers
- Doctoral advisor: Dr. David M. Holburn, University of Cambridge
- Website: https://engineering.tufts.edu/ece/koomson/

Valencia Joyner Koomson is an American electrical engineer. She is an associate professor in the Department of Electrical and Computer Engineering with secondary appointments in the Department of Computer Science and the Jonathan M. Tisch College of Civic Life at Tufts University. She is the principal investigator for the Advanced Integrated Circuits and Systems Lab at Tufts University.

== Early life and education ==
Koomson was born in Washington, DC and graduated from Benjamin Banneker Academic High School. Her parents, Otis and Vernese Joyner, moved to Washington DC during the Great Migration after living for years as sharecroppers in Wilson County, North Carolina. Her family history can be traced back to the Antebellum South era. Her oldest known relative is Hagar Atkinson, an enslaved African woman whose name is recorded in the will of a plantation owner in Johnston County, North Carolina established in 1746.

== Research and career ==
Koomson attended the Massachusetts Institute of Technology, graduating with a BS in electrical engineering and computer science in 1998 and a Master of Engineering in 1999. she earned her Master of Philosophy from the University of Cambridge in 2000, followed by her PhD in electrical engineering from the same institution in 2003.

Koomson was an adjunct professor at Howard University from 2004 to 2005, and during that period was a Senior Research Engineer at the University of Southern California's Information Sciences Institute (USC/ISI). She was a visiting professor at Rensselaer Polytechnic Institute and Boston University in 2008 and 2013, respectively. Koomson joined Tufts University in 2005 as an assistant professor and became an associate professor in 2011. In 2020, Koomson was named an MLK Visiting Professor at MIT for the academic year 2020/2021.

Her Advanced Integrated Circuits and Systems Lab continues to do research into the design and implementation of innovative high-performance, low-power microsystems, with a focus on the integration of heterogeneous devices/materials (optical, RF, bio/chemical) with silicon circuit architectures to address challenges in high-speed wireless communication, biomedical imaging, and sensing. Recently, Koomson has focused on addressing racial bias in medical devices and algorithms, including the pulse oximeter device that became widely used by the public during the COVID-19 pandemic. She's been addressing this concern through the development of technology designed to measure a person's skin tone. This innovation will allow the pulse oximeter to emit more light into the device, ensuring individuals with higher melanin levels receive a more accurate reading. Koomson has also been actively engaged with policymakers and scientists, advocating for an FDA review of the biases linked to pulse oximeters. This effort played a pivotal role in orchestrating an FDA forum which gathered in late 2022 to address the issue. She shared with The Tufts Admission Magazine, "I spent one summer contacting our congressional delegation in Massachusetts to ensure lawmakers are aware of these issues and talking to their staff members who focus on health policy. Senator Warren led the charge in 2021 to urge the Food and Drug Administration (FDA) to review this." In addition to her work with medical devices, Koomson played a crucial role in a collaborative team focused on developing a Hybrid VLC/RF parking automation system.

== Honors and awards ==
- MLK Visiting Professor at MIT, 2020
