= Lemos family =

Greek ship-owning family

The Lemos family is a prominent Greek ship owning family which has been involved in shipping since the 18th century. They originated from Kardamyli in Mani as the 'Lemaki' family. During this period Turkish soldiers had violated many local villages and as a response members from the Lemaki family assassinated all of the Turkish troops stationed there. They emigrated to Chios and changed their names to Lemos during the journey to avoid detection. Having moved from Kardamyli and Langada in the Mani region they then named the areas in Chios "Kardamila" and "Lagada". From 1860 to 1914 the family owned 52 vessels.

== Historical highlights ==
- In 1905, Capt. Christos M. Lemos (1867-1940) was co-owner and first master of the Marietta Ralli, which Greek shipping lore has commemorated as the first steamship owned by seafarers from Oinousses, one of the country's foremost maritime islands.
- In recognition of their contribution to the war effort, the family was a recipient of one of the famous 100 Liberty Vessels which restored the fortunes of the Greek merchant fleet in the aftermath of the Second World War.
- Another touchstone of family pride is Capt. Leon C. Lemos, founder of Efploia Shipping, one of the most renowned Greek shipowners in the 1970s and 1980s.
- After selling off 15 of his 17 vessels in 1980 just prior to the crash, Capt. Lemos re-entered the market in 1985 while conditions were still at a low ebb, ordering a series of 10 bulkers from Hyundai Heavy Industries.
- Even though most of the Lemos family still live in Greece, a substantial amount now reside in multimillion-pound houses in London's Mayfair and St. John's Wood Districts.

== See also ==
- Atlas Maritime
- Marcos Lemos
