= Shock and Vibration Information Analysis Center =

The Shock and Vibration Information Analysis Center (SAVIAC) is a U.S. Government organization established by the U.S. Navy Office of Naval Research on 20 December 1946.

== Purpose ==
SAVIAC's purpose is to promulgate information on the transient and vibratory response of structures and materials. This broad field includes such technical areas as the testing, analysis and design of structural or mechanical systems subjected to dynamic conditions and loading such as vibration, blast, impact, and shock for various agencies in the U.S. Government including NASA, the Department of Energy (DOE), and the Department of Defense (DOD).

== Sponsored projects ==
The organization sponsored the professional journal Shock and Vibration Journal and currently sponsors and publishes the professional journal Journal of Critical Technology in Shock and Vibration. SAVIAC also sponsored and published a series of monograms addressing different aspects of shock and vibration.

== SAVIAC yearly symposiums ==
SAVIAC assembled and promoted a yearly symposium. The annual Shock and Vibration Symposium was the leading forum for the structural dynamics and vibration community to present and discuss new developments and ongoing research. The Symposium, established in 1947, includes both classified and unclassified sessions. The classified sessions allow critical technology and classified (up to secret level) research to be presented in closed forums of cleared U.S. government and government contractor researchers.

Topics covered at the symposium include shock-ship testing, water shock, weapons effects (air blast, ground shock, cratering, penetration), shock physics, earthquake engineering, structural dynamics, and shock and vibration instrumentation and experiment techniques. Over 200 technical papers were typically presented. Panel discussions addressed topics such as new software developments or accelerometer isolation problems. Tutorials provide up-to-date technology overviews by leading specialists.

Since 2012, the Shock and Vibration Symposium has continued under the management and sponsorship of SAVE.

== Inactivity and SAVE succession ==
In 2012, SAVIAC became inactive as a result of new Department of Defense cost-cutting regulations limiting DoD sponsorship and participation of conferences and workshops. SAVIAC has been succeeded by an industrially-funded and managed "Shock and Vibration Exchange" SAVE.
