= Sung-Yoon Lee bibliography =

Sung-Yoon Lee is a scholar, policy advisor, and author specialized on North Korea and East Asia. His written opus has focussed on exposing the wrongdoings of the North Korean regime and advancing policies to curb it. He has contributed to media outlets, published academic papers and a book, and written statements as part of his expert witness advice to the U.S. Congress. His writing style has been described as exuberant, vivid, and sharp, with a meticulous and insightful analysis.

== Books ==
Lee has profiled Kim Yo Jong, the sister and closest aid to North Korea's supreme leader Kim Jong Un. Reviewers of Lee's work noted that despite the at-times gentle demeanor, she is at least as ruthless as her brother, is ready to succeed him if necessary, and she would maintain the nature of the regime. Reviewers of both critical and positive coincided in noting the unusual nature of the work, given the closed nature of the regime had to contend with a dearth of normal biographical sources and lacked direct access to the subject. The author aimed to remedy these limitations by delving deeper into on the broader context of the regime and Kim family history, as well as by conducting a detailed analysis of the subject's public appearances and written public statements. Some critics were unsatisfied with this approach while others were positive.

- Lee, Sung-Yoon (2023). The Sister: North Korea's Kim Yo Jong, the Most Dangerous Woman in the World. U.S.: PublicAffairs (Hachette). ISBN 9781529073539.

== Academic articles ==
Lee has notably warned the international community, especially the U.S. and South Korea not to cave-in to the brinksmanship maneuvers by North Korea, nor to fall for false overtures to reconciliation, which in fact only seeks to extract gains for the regime. In his published works Lee has noted that the North has been repeatedly successful at manipulating the South and its allies with these cycles of threats and then diplomacy, which he named the Pyongyang playbook.

- Lee, Sung-Yoon (2003). "Nuclear Diplomacy vis-à-vis the DPRK: A Dead-End Street". The Fletcher Forum of World Affairs. 27 (2).
- Lee, Sung-Yoon (2005). "The mythical nuclear kingdom of North Korea". The Fletcher Forum of World Affairs. 29 (2).
- Lee, Sung-Yoon (2005). "Dependence and Defiance: Historical Dilemmas in U.S.-Korea Relations". Korea Policy Review.
- Lee, Sung-Yoon (2006). "'The Folly of Fabled Sentimentality: South Korea's Unorthodox Courtship of North Korea" (PDF). The Woodrow Wilson International Center for Scholars Special Report (134). Archived from the original (PDF) on December 11, 2014.
- Lee, Sung-Yoon (2007). "The United States Should Make North Korean Human Rights a Priority". In Gerdes, Louise (ed.). Opposing Viewpoints: 'North Korea and South Korea. Farmington Hills, MI, USA: Greenhaven Press. ISBN 978-0737737653.
- Lee, Sung-Yoon (2010). "Engaging North Korea: The Clouded Legacy of South Korea's Sunshine Policy". AEI Outlook Series. American Enterprise Institute.
- Lee, Sung-Yoon (August 26, 2010). "The Pyongyang Playbook". Foreign Affairs.
- Lee, Seong-yun (2012). "Build It, and They Will Recompense: North Korea's Nuclear Strategy". Asia Policy (13): 178–181. doi:10.1353/asp.2012.0008. Wikidata Q136693775.
- Lee, Sung-Yoon (2013). "North Korean Exceptionalism and South Korean Conventionalism: Prospects for a Reverse Formulation?". Asia Policy. 15 (1): 62–68. doi:10.1353/asp.2013.0008. S2CID 153831547.
- Lee, Sung-Yoon (Fall 2014). "North Korea's Revolutionary Unification Policy" (PDF). International Journal of Korean Studies. XVIII (2): 121–137. Archived (PDF) from the original on 2020-07-15.
- Lee, Sung-Yoon; Stanton, Joshua (2015). "North Korea's Next Dare – What Is Coming—and What to Do About It". Foreign Affairs.
- Lee, Sung-Yoon (January 18, 2017). "How Trump Can Get Tough on North Korea - Making Kim Pay for Belligerence". Foreign Affairs.
- Lee, Sung-Yoon; Stanton, Joshua; Klingner, Bruce (2017). "Getting Tough on North Korea: How to Hit Pyongyang Where It Hurts". Foreign Affairs. 96 (65).
- Lee, Seong-yun (2018). "Seoul's Supporting Role in Pyongyang's Sanctions-Busting Scheme". Asia Policy. 13 (3): 13–19. doi:10.1353/asp.2018.0036. Wikidata Q136693035.

== Congressional testimony ==
Lee has published written statements as part of his testimony as an expert witness in U.S. Congress hearings. In those hearings he notably argued for the strengthening of sanctions against North Korea, warned about North Korea's history of brinksmanship, and pointed to the key role of China is facilitating or impeding international pressure on North Korea.

- Testimony of Sung-Yoon Lee, Hearing on "North Korea's Criminal Activities: Financing the Regime" (PDF) (Report). United States House Committee on Foreign Affairs. 2013. Archived (PDF) from the original on 2013-03-09.
- Testimony of Sung-Yoon Lee, Hearing on "Pressuring North Korea: Evaluating Options" (PDF) (Report). United States House Foreign Affairs Subcommittee on Asia and the Pacific. 2017. Archived (PDF) from the original on 2023-04-10.
- Testimony of Sung-Yoon Lee, Hearing on "North Korea's Diplomatic Gambit: Will History Repeat Itself?" (PDF) (Report). United States House Foreign Affairs Subcommittee on Asia and the Pacific. 2018. Archived (PDF) from the original on 2018-04-12.
- Testimony of Sung-Yoon Lee, Hearing on "The Way Forward on U.S. North Korea Policy" (PDF) (Report). United States House Foreign Affairs Subcommittee on Asia and the Pacific. 2022. Archived (PDF) from the original on 2022-05-17.

== Short essays ==
Lee has actively advanced his geopolitical analysis and policy recommendations through engagement with mass media, especially by publishing articles in newspapers and other media outlets.

Lee has often collaborated with Joshua Stanton, a North Korean human rights advocate and a lawyer based in Washington D.C., together co-authoring multiple articles to advance legislation of tougher sanctions.

Given the despotic nature of the North Korean regime, its oppression of its own population and the nuclear threats to international security, Lee has proposed a strategy of stern treatment of the North Korean government, while engaging the North Korean people.

The first is primarily to be pursued with sanctions that create economic pressure aimed at the elite; reducing the available resources to the regime, and diminishing the loyalty of the ruling. Lee sees this as the only non-military way to force the regime into a real negotiation on denuclearization and human rights. Lee has repeatedly further asserted that strong sanctions must not be undermined by false peace overtures by the regime to trick the international community into concessionary diplomacy. The second is to be pursued as humanitarian aid for the population, increasing efforts to disseminate more information from the outside world into North Korea, facilitating defections, and pressing for a global campaign of human rights.

- "A Korean Day of Infamy". The Weekly Standard. 2006. Archived from the original on 2021-12-22.
- "Pyongyang Home Truths: Does Hillary Clinton understand the North Korean regime and how to deal with it?". The Wall Street Journal Asia. 2009.
- "Ain't No Sunshine: The Failings of Kim Dae Jung". Foreign Policy. 2009. Archived from the original on 2009-08-27.
- "Life After Kim: Planning for a Post-Kim Jong Il Korea". Foreign Policy. 2010. Archived from the original on 2010-03-24.
- "Hitting the North". Los Angeles Times. 2010. Archived from the original on 2019-11-07.
- "US misses history lessons on Korea". Asia Times Online. 2010. Archived from the original on 2010-07-03.
- "Keeping the Peace: America in Korea 1950–2010". Imprimis. 2010. Archived from the original on 2011-03-26.
- "An American Peace in Korea". USA Today Magazine. Vol. 139, no. 2790. March 2011. Archived from the original on 2014-07-26.
- "The winter of Kim Jong-il's discontent". The Christian Science Monitor. 2011. Archived from the original on 2011-01-08.
- "North Korea's Carrot-and-Stick Policy". Los Angeles Times. 2011. Archived from the original on 2014-02-02.
- "Containing the Young Kim". The Wall Street Journal. 2011. (co-authored with Sue Terry)
- "The Boy Who Would Be King: Can Kim III Last?". National Bureau of Asia Research. 2011.
- "Pyongyang's Latest Ploy". The Wall Street Journal. 2012.
- "Why North Korea's Rocket Mattered". The New York Times. 2012.
- "South Korea's New President Must Challenge the North". The New York Times. 2012.
- "Don't engage Kim Jong Un — bankrupt him". Foreign Policy. 2013. Archived from the original on 2014-11-22. (co-authored with Joshua Stanton)
- "Hit Kim Jong Eun where it hurts: His wallet". The Washington Post. 2013. (co-authored with Joshua Stanton)
- "Seoul Mates?". Foreign Policy. 2013.
- "North Korea is far from suicidal". CNN. 2013.
- "Rodman just a toy for N. Korea's Kim". CNN. 2013.
- "South Korea's Chomskyite flunkeys". Asia Times Online. 2013. Archived from the original on 2013-12-13.
- "World must awaken to North Korea's camps of horror". CNN. 2013. (co-authored with Joshua Stanton)
- "Abe's Profane Pilgrimage". The New York Times. 2014.
- "Financial sanctions could force reforms in North Korea". Washington Post. 2014. (co-authored with Joshua Stanton)
- "Financial sanctions could force reforms in North Korea". (co-authored with Joshua Stanton)
- "Pyongyang's Hunger Games". The New York Times. 2014. (co-authored with Joshua Stanton)
- "The danger of North Korea is no joke". CNN. 2014. (co-authored with Joshua Stanton)
- "Luxury cars and cognac for...North Korea?". CNN. 2014. (co-authored with Joshua Stanton)
- "A North Korean Con Job". The New York Times. 2014. (co-authored with Joshua Stanton)
- "Shinzo Abe's Sorry Apology". May 1, 2015. (co-authored with Zach Przystup)
- "Make Pyongyang Pay – Stop North Korea by hitting it where it hurts: its wallet". Foreign Policy. February 10, 2016. (co-authored with Joshua Stanton)
- "How to get serious with North Korea". CNN. February 15, 2016. (co-authored with Joshua Stanton)
- "Beef Up Sanctions on North Korea". The Wall Street Journal. Jan 4, 2016. (co-authored with Joshua Stanton)
- "Why Do We Appease North Korea?". The New York Times. May 17, 2017.
- "The Way to Make North Korea Back Down". The New York Times. September 6, 2017.
- "Why won't the U.S. use its full sanction power against North Korea?". Los Angeles Times. September 8, 2017.
- "Dear America: Don't fall for Pyongyang's predictable, poisonous ploy". The Hill. January 4, 2018.
- "Sex and the City: The 'Pyongyang Games'". The Hill. January 23, 2018.
- "Kim Jong Un: The greatest showman". The Hill. February 6, 2018.
- "Pyongyang's provocative propagandists". The Hill. February 27, 2018.
- "Kim Jong Un's killer Trump trap". The Hill. March 12, 2018.
- "Kim Jong Un's weaponization of weirdness". The Hill. April 2, 2018.
- "A Korean comedy of errors". The Hill. April 27, 2018.
- "Meet Kim Jong Un, the Korean G.O.A.T." The Hill. May 16, 2018.
- "Trump must stick to his snub of Kim Jong Un". The Hill. May 26, 2018.
- "The Singapore Sling: Summit Risks Sanctions Fizzle". The Hill. June 11, 2018.
- "Another Page in the Pyongyang Playbook". Centre for International Governance Innovation. June 15, 2018.
- "Bankrupt and shame Kim Jong Un for his Singapore con job". The Hill. June 27, 2018.
- "Make Kim Jong Un Pay this 'Victory Day'". The Hill. July 26, 2018.
- "A Korean Day to Remember--for America". The Hill. August 15, 2018.
- "Moon Over Pyongyang, Peddles Peace". The Hill. September 23, 2018.
- "Welcome to the Showdown over South Korea's Seoul". The National Interest. November 5, 2018.
- "Pyongyang's portentous New Year's resolution". The Hill. January 2, 2019.
- "Can US-South Korea alliance survive tensions among Trump, Kim and Moon?". The Hill. January 29, 2019.
- "North Korea and America's Second Summit: Here's What Sung-Yoon Lee Thinks Will Happen - "The train of events that Donald Trump has unwittingly unleashed is the nuclear proliferation of Northeast Asia."". The National Interest. February 6, 2019.
- "Trump checks Kim Jong Un's Hanoi peace ploy--for now". The Hill. February 28, 2019.
- "How Trump and the US fell for Kim Jong-un's deadly deception". South China Morning Post. March 1, 2019.
- "Free Joseon is a North Korean resistance movement, not a criminal enterprise". Los Angeles Times. April 25, 2019.
- "Kim Jong Un, North Korea's dutiful son, restores Russia's role as defender". The Hill. April 28, 2019.
- "Kim Jong-un Shot a Rocket? He Wants to Talk - President Trump should deny him the privilege". The New York Times. May 4, 2019.
- "Meet Kim Jong Un, 'King of Korea' — antithesis of Hamlet, Prince of Denmark". The Hill. December 19, 2019.
- "Kim Jong-un's Resolute New Year's Declamation". The National Interest. January 6, 2020.
- "Kim Yo Jong: The girl who would be Kim IV". The Hill. April 27, 2020.
- "The Korean War: The origin of Pyongyang's state lies". The Hill. June 25, 2020.
- "Why Did Kim Jong-un's Sister Become the Face of North Korea? - He's fierce. She's fiercer. Or so goes their game". The New York Times. June 26, 2020.
- "Seoul Cracks Down on Dissent Against North Korea". Wall Street Journal. September 9, 2020. (co-authored with Joshua Stanton)
- "North Korea's latest missile provocation isn't surprising at all – it was entirely predictable – It follows a well-worn playbook for North Korea". Big Think. September 27, 2021.
- "Kim Jong Un's decade in power: Starvation, repression and brutal rule – just like his father and grandfather". The Conversation. December 17, 2021.
- "South Korea's new president must embrace the people of North Korea". The Hill. March 11, 2022.
- "Biden should visit South Korea's Jeju April 3rd Peace Park". The Hill. April 6, 2022.
- "Biden's trip to South Korea may spark a new friendship". The Hill. May 20, 2022.
- "Seoul and Washington must not blink in the face of Pyongyang's nuclear blackmail". The Hill. August 19, 2022.
- "It's time to take Kim Jong Un and his nuclear threats seriously". The Conversation. October 13, 2022.
- "Bring US nukes back to South Korea to counter Kim Jong Un's deadly game". The Hill. October 19, 2022.
- "North Korea: A land of dynastic decay and limitless death". The Hill. December 8, 2022. Archived from the original on 2023-02-08.
- "South Korea, US presidents to meet in Washington – amid wary glances in the direction of Pyongyang, Beijing and Moscow". The Conversation. April 25, 2023.
- "US-South Korea nuclear weapons deal – what you need to know". The Conversation. April 27, 2023.
- "North Korea's most dangerous woman: Meet Kim Jong-un's sister Yo-jong - Tipped to be the future leader, she is also a ruthless force who reportedly ordered the executions of officials for 'getting on her nerves". The Daily Telegraph. June 6, 2023. Archived from the original on 2023-06-06.
- "An American Prisoner Gives North Korea A Bargaining Chip". The Messenger. July 22, 2023. Archived from the original on 2023-07-22.
- "How Kim Jong Un became Prince Charming - Russia needs North Korea more than ever". UnHerd. September 15, 2023. Archived from the original on 2023-09-16.
- "North Korea's 'Victory Day' takes place with Kim Jong Un's power transformed – Pyongyang's account of the Korean War remains a fabrication. But its rapidly growing strategic leverage is dangerously real". Chatham House. July 27, 2026. Archived from the original on 2026-07-28.

== Other ==
Judicial expert witness work

- United States v. Christopher Philip Ahn, case 2:19-cv-05397-FLA-JPR (Document 197-1) -- Supplemental Exhibit A -- Letter to the Court by expert witness Sung-Yoon Lee (Report). U.S.District Court for the Central District of California. May 18, 2021.

Book chapter

- Lee, Sung-Yoon (2018). "Forgotten Borders: Japan's Maritime Operations in the Korean War and Implication for North Korea". In Gresh, Geoffrey F. (ed.). Eurasia's Maritime Rise and Global Security: From the Indian Ocean to Pacific Asia and the Arctic. Palgrave Studies in Maritime Politics and Security. Palgrave Macmillan. pp. 97–112. doi:10.1007/978-3-319-71806-4_7. ISBN 978-3319718057.
