= Alan M. Wachman =

American academic

Alan Michael Wachman
- 华安澜
- Born: October 13, 1958; Bucks County, Pennsylvania
- Died: June 21, 2012 (aged 53)
- Other name: 华安澜
- Known for: Cross-strait relations
- Spouse: Laura Hess
- Children: 2

Academic background
- Education: Harvard University (B.A.); The Fletcher School of Law and Diplomacy (M.A.); Harvard University (M.A.),(Ph.D.)
- Thesis: Converging quests : identity, nationalism, and democratization in Taiwan (1992)
- Doctoral advisor: Roderick MacFarquhar

Academic work
- Discipline: East Asian politics and international relations
- Institutions: Johns Hopkins University-Nanjing University Center for Chinese and American Studies in the PRC; China Institute in America; The Fletcher School of Law and Diplomacy

Alan Michael Wachman (Chinese: 华安澜, pinyin: Huá Ānlán; October 13, 1958 – June 21, 2012) was a scholar of East Asian politics and international relations, specializing in cross-strait relations and Sino-U.S. relations. He was a professor of international politics at The Fletcher School of Law and Diplomacy, Tufts University. Previously he had been the co-director of the Johns Hopkins University-Nanjing University Center for Chinese and American Studies in the PRC, and the president of China Institute in America.

== Education and career ==
Alan Wachman majored in art history at Harvard University. During his studies he took a course in Asian art, sparking his interest in Asia. In 1980 he graduated magna cum laude with a Bachelor of Fine Arts. His undergraduate thesis was A seated wooden Kuan-yin in the Fogg Art Museum: an analysis of style and an examination of Chinese Buddhist iconography. Having completed his degree, he went to teach English in Taiwan. While abroad he met Paul Hsu, alumnus and board member of The Fletcher School of Law and Diplomacy, who encouraged him to pursue graduate studies there.

Wachman subsequently attended The Fletcher School. There he studied international relations as part of the Master of Arts in Law and Diplomacy program, graduating in 1984. He continued his graduate studies in government at Harvard University, where he completed a Master of Arts in 1988 and a PhD in 1992. His doctoral dissertation was titled Converging quests: identity, nationalism, and democratization in Taiwan.

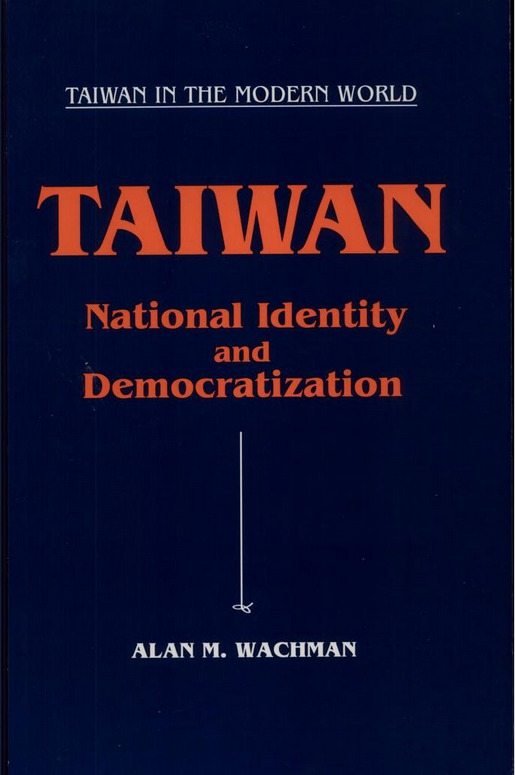
Book cover for Taiwan: National Identity and Democratization, written by Wachman, published in 1994

From 1993 and until 1995 he became the American Co-Director of the Johns Hopkins University-Nanjing University Center for Chinese and American Studies in the PRC. From 1995 to 1997 he served in New York as the president of China Institute in America.

In 1997 he began to work at The Fletcher School as an assistant professor of international politics, later being promoted to associate professor and gaining tenure. Concurrently, he was involved in other positions. Between 2008 and 2009 he was a fellow in the East Asia Institute's Program on Peace, Governance, and Development in East Asia, as a guest lecturer at Peking University in Beijing, East Asia Institute in Seoul, and Keio University in Tokyo.

Wachman was also a member of the editorial boards of Asia Policy, China Security, Issues and Studies: A Social Science Quarterly on China, Taiwan, and East Asian Affairs and Harvard Studies on Taiwan. His research included grant support from the Smith Richardson Foundation, the Chiang Ching-kuo Foundation, and the East-West Center.

After a year of battling pancreatic cancer, Alan Wachman died on June 21, 2012, at the age of 53. The Professor Alan M. Wachman Memorial Fund, a scholarship endowed at The Fletcher School in his memory, supports "students engaging in international non-profit work and reflects Alan's fundamental belief in the importance of making the world a better place."

== Personal life ==
Alan Wachman was the son of Barbara and Harold Y. Wachman of Lexington, Massachusetts. Harold Y. Wachman was a professor and a director of graduate studies in the department of aeronautics and astronautics at the Massachusetts Institute of Technology.

In 1997 Wachman married Laura Hess, a professor of Chinese at Brown University. They had two children.

== Research ==
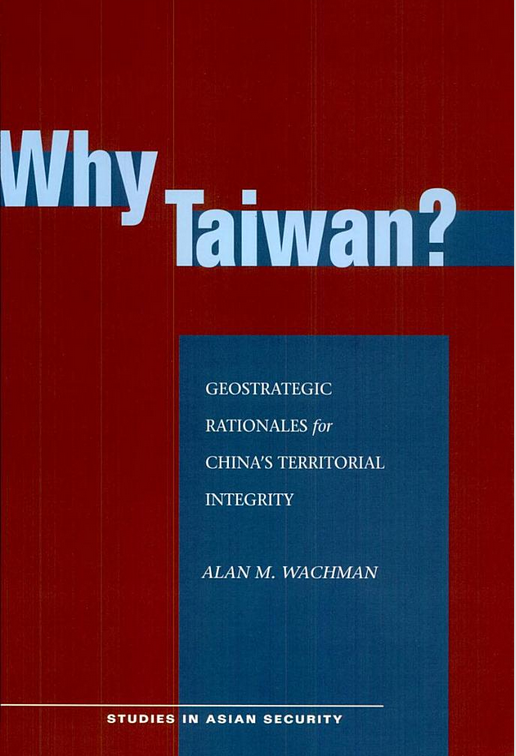
Book cover for Why Taiwan? Geostrategic Rationales for China's Territorial Integrity, written by Wachman and published in 2007

Wachman's scholarly work focused on the study of Taiwan, cross-strait relations, Chinese foreign relations and Sino-US relations. He researched links between diplomatic history and contemporary international security. His books Taiwan: National Identity and Democratization (1994) and Why Taiwan? Geostrategic Rationales for China's Territorial Integrity (2007) contributed to the understanding of cross-strait relations, and informed policy making. He provided expert testimony to the United States-China Economic and Security Review Commission.

Wachman also focused on Mongolia's international relations. During his last years he was working on completing a book about Mongolia’s national security in the context of emerging rivalries among great powers in Asia.

== Publications ==
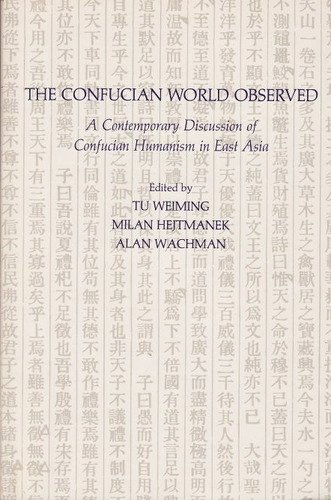
Book cover of The Confucian World Observed: A Contemporary Discussion of Confucian Humanism in East Asia, 1992, edited by Tu Weiming, and Wachman

=== Books ===
- Tu, Weiming; Hejtmanek, Milan; Wachman, Alan M., eds. (1992). The Confucian World Observed: A Contemporary Discussion of Confucian Humanism in east Asia. University of Hawaii Press. ISBN 978-0824814519.
- Wachman, Alan M. (1994). Taiwan: National Identity and Democratization. M.E. Sharpe. ISBN 978-1563243981.
- Graham, Lawrence; Farkas, Richard P.; Grady, Robert C.; Joffe, George; Studlar, Donley T.; Wachman, Alan M. (2006). The Politics of Governing: A Comparative Introduction. Washington, D.C.: CQ Press. ISBN 978-1933116662.
- Wachman, Alan M. (2007). Why Taiwan? Geostrategic Rationales for China's Territorial Integrity. Stanford University Press. ISBN 978-0804755542.

=== Articles ===
- Wachman, Alan M. (1984). "Carter's constitutional conundrum: an examination of the president's unilateral termination of a treaty (Mutual Defense Treaty with Taiwan)". The Fletcher Forum of World Affairs. hdl:10427/76376.
- Tu, Weiming; Wachman, Alan M. (1990). "Workshop on Confucian Humanism". Bulletin of the American Academy of Arts and Sciences. 43 (6): 10. doi:10.2307/3824177. JSTOR 3824177.
- Wachman, Alan M. (2000). "United States' Policy and Taiwan's Struggle to Sustain the Status Quo". Harvard Studies on Taiwan: Papers of the Taiwan Studies Workshop. 3.
- Wachman, Alan M. (2000). "Taiwan: Parent, Province, or Blackballed State?". Journal of Asian and African Studies. 35 (1): 183–203. doi:10.1163/156852100512112.
- Wachman, Alan M. (2001). "Does the Diplomacy of Shame Promote Human Rights in China?". Third World Quarterly. 22 (2): 257–281. doi:10.1080/01436590120043309. JSTOR 3993410. S2CID 145512142.
- Wachman, Alan M. (2002). "Credibility and the U.S. Defense of Taiwan: Nullifying the Notion of a "Taiwan Threat"". Issues & Studies. 38 (1). Archived from the original on 2016-03-03.
- Wachman, Alan M. (2002). "The China-Taiwan Relationship: A Cold War of Words". Orbis. 46 (4): 695–711. doi:10.1016/S0030-4387(02)00153-9.
- Wachman, Alan M. (2005). "American policy towards China'". Politique Américaine.
- Wachman, Alan M. (2009). "Don't forsake Mongolia, in Special Round Table, Advising the new President" (PDF). Asia Policy. 7 (1). Archived from the original (PDF) on 2016-03-04.
- Wachman, Alan M. (2009). "Thinking About a Healthy Military Balance in the Taiwan Strait". Asia Policy. 8 (1): 25–32. doi:10.1353/asp.2009.0076. S2CID 155008963.
- Wachman, Alan M. (2005). "Stamped Out!: Carto-Philatelic Evidence of the PRC's Constructed Notion of China's Territorial Integrity". East Asia: An International Quarterly. 22 (31): 31–55. doi:10.1007/s12140-005-0008-4. S2CID 153803533.
- Wachman, Alan M. (2007). "La politique chinoise des Etats-Unis ou l'Amérique face à elle-même (The United States' Chinese policy, or America faced with itself)". Monde chinois.
- Wachman, Alan M. (Winter 2008). "Ensnared by Beijing: Washington Succumbs to the PRC's Diplomacy of Panic". WSI China Security. 4 (1).
- Wachman, Alan M. (2010). "Suffering What It Must? Mongolia and the Power of the 'Weak'". Orbis: A Journal of World Affairs. 54 (4): 583–602. doi:10.1016/j.orbis.2010.07.006.

=== Book chapters ===
- Competing Identities in Taiwan chapter in The Other Taiwan. 1945 to the Present edited by Murray A. Rubinsten (Armonk (NY): M.E. Sharpe, 1994)
- America's Taiwan Quandary: How Much Does Chen's Election Matter chapter in Taiwan's Presidential Politics, Democratization and Cross-Strait Relations in the Twenty-first Century (Taiwan in the Modern World) edited by Muthiah Alagappa (Armonk (NY): M.E. Sharpe, 2001)
- Constitutional Diplomacy: Taipei's Pen, Beijing's Sword. chapter in Global Studies, China edited by Suzanne Ogden (Dushkin Pub Group, 2005)
- Did Abraham Lincoln Oppose Taiwan’s Secession from China? chapter in Secession as an International Phenomenon, edited by Don H. Doyle (University of Georgia Press, 2010)
- Playing by or Playing with the Rules of UNCLOS? chapter in Military Activities in the EEZ, edited by Peter Dutton (Naval War College - China Maritime Studies Institute, 2010)
- Why China Gets a "Rise" Out of Us: Ruminations on PRC Foreign Relations chapter in The People's Republic of China at 60: An International Assessment, edited by William C. Kirby (Harvard University Press, 2011)

=== Short essays ===
- Words Matter, Mr. Clinton (Far Eastern Economic Review, 1998)
- Yiguo, liangzhi (one country, two systems) in the Encyclopedia of Contemporary Chinese Culture, edited by Edward L Davis, (Routledge, 2004)
- China’s Lincolnophilia (The China Beat, November 27, 2009 )

=== Congressional hearings ===
- Written statement of Alan Wachman at the hearing on The U.S.-China relationship: Economics and security in perspective (United States-China Economic and Security Review Commission, February 1–2, 2007)
  - Full transcript of hearing
- Written statement of Alan Wachman at the hearing on China’s Current and Emerging Foreign Policy Priorities (United States-China Economic and Security Review Commission, April 13, 2011)
  - Full transcript of hearing
