= Institute for Global Maritime Studies =

- Formation: 2008
- Type: Educational NGO
- Purpose: Research policy issues relating to the sea
- Headquarters: Gloucester, Massachusetts
- Director, Board Chair: John Curtis Perry
- Director, President: Rockford Weitz
- Director: Sea Sovereign Thomas
- Director: Dan Finamore
- Main organ: Board of Directors
- Website: http://igms.org/

Institute for Global Maritime Studies, also known as IGMS (established in 2008) is a maritime studies non-profit organization dedicated to policy-oriented education and research.

== History and activity ==
The institute was co-founded by John Curtis Perry, professor at The Fletcher School of Law and Diplomacy, and director of the Maritime Studies program. Other co-founders include Rockford Weitz, Scott Borgerson, Enrique Hidalgo and Andrew C. Hess. In 2015 Rocky Weitz succeeded Perry as the president of the institute.

IGMS is composed of fellows who produce and publish research. Fellows' works have been published both in the IGMS site as well as in other publications. Fellows also attend conferences and do on-site research through various field trips.

In 2013 the IGMS expanded its reach to the maritime community by establishing a Greek Chapter under the official name Institute of Global Maritime Chapter-Greek Chapter.

== Works ==
=== Published papers and studies ===
- Oceanic Revolution and Pacific Asia, by John Curtis Perry, (The Fletcher Forum of World Affairs, 2011)
- The National Interest and the Law of the Sea by Scott Borgerson (May 2009, Council on Foreign Relations)
- America's Deep Blue Highway: How Coastal Shipping Could Reduce Traffic Congestion, Lower Pollution, and Bolster National Security by John Curtis Perry, Scott Borgerson and Rockford Weitz (Institute for Global Maritime Studies, 2008)

=== Op-eds ===
- The Coming Arctic Boom by Scott Borgerson (July/August 2013, Foreign Affairs)
- Negroponte: The U.S. will be lost without LOST by Scott Borgerson, Vern Clark, Bill Cohen, and Jim Loy and John Negroponte (July 16, 2012, Washington Times)
- Time to Take Alaska Out of the Icebox by Scott Borgerson and Scott Minerd (July 22, 2011, The Wall Street Journal)
- The Great Game Moves North by Scott Borgerson (March 25, 2009, Foreign Affairs)
- Sea Change by Scott Borgerson (November, 2008, The Atlantic Monthly, Vol. 302 No. 4)
- Arctic Meltdown by Scott Borgerson (March/April 2008, Foreign Affairs)

=== Congressional hearings ===
- "Defending U.S. Economic Interests in the Changing Arctic: Is There a Strategy?". gpo.gov. July 27, 2011., including Scott Borgerson as expert witness (July 27, 2011, Subcommittee on Oceans, Atmosphere, Fisheries, and Coast Guard; Committee on Commerce, Science, and Transportation. Senate)
- Implications of a Warming Arctic, including Scott Borgerson as expert witness (May 5, 2009, Committee on Foreign Relations. Senate)
- Climate change and the arctic: New frontiers of the national security, including Scott Borgerson as expert witness (March 25, 2009, Committee on Foreign Affairs. House)
