= John Curtis Perry =

American historian (1930–2025)

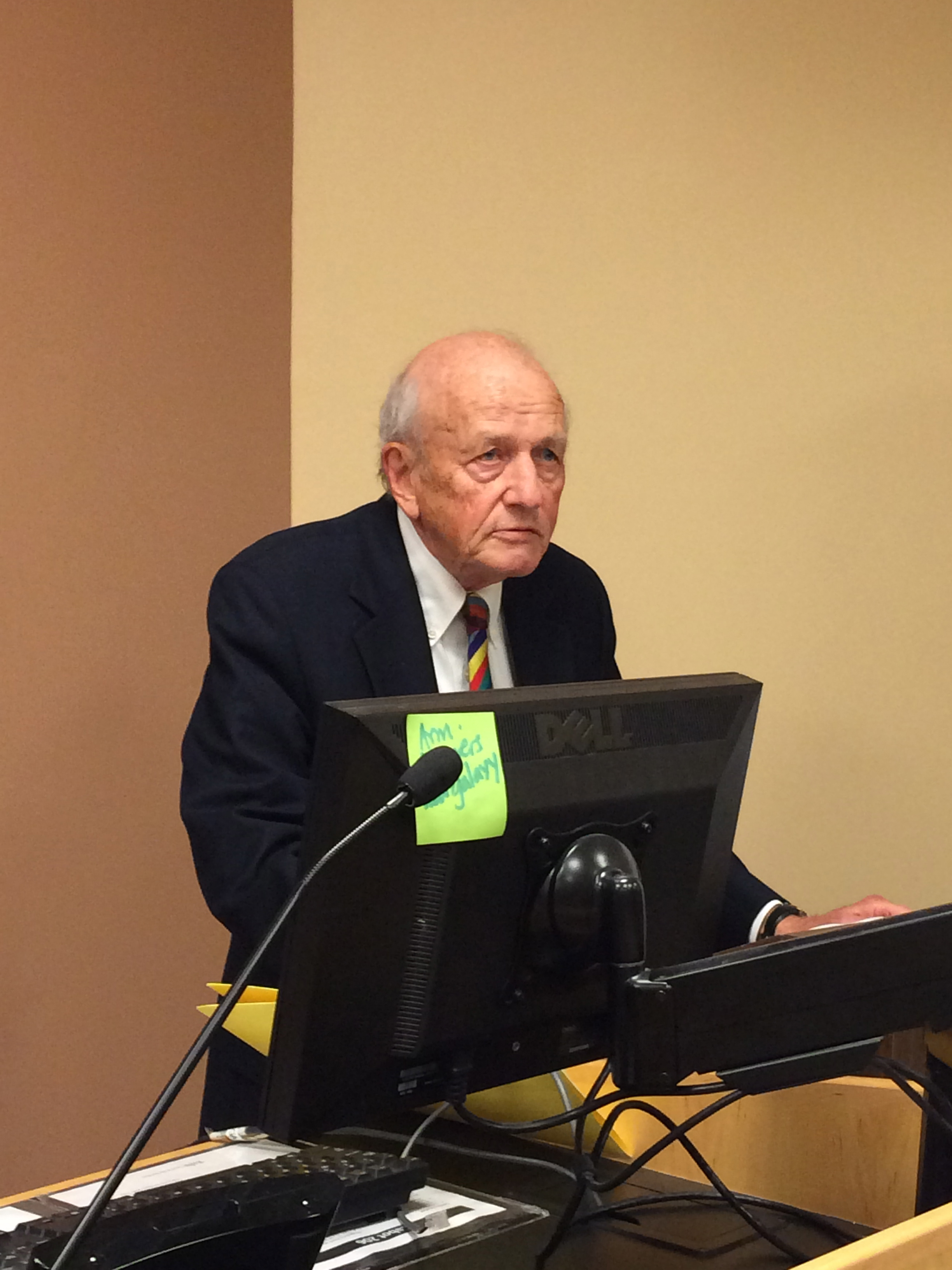
- Perry in a lecture in 2013
- Born: July 18, 1930; Orange, New Jersey, U.S.
- Died: March 1, 2025 (aged 94); Gloucester, Massachusetts, U.S.
- Other names: ペリー, ジョン・カーティス
- Spouse: Sarah Hollis French
- Children: 5
- Awards: Imperial decoration of the Order of the Sacred Treasure (Japan)

Academic background
- Education: Yale University (BA, MA); Harvard University (PhD)
- Thesis: Great Britain and the Imperial Japanese Navy, 1858-1905 (1962)
- Doctoral advisor: Edwin O. Reischauer; Robert G. Albion
- Other advisor: George Vernadsky

Academic work
- Discipline: East Asian studies, Maritime studies
- Institutions: Carleton College; Connecticut College; The Fletcher School of Law and Diplomacy
- Notable students: Alan M. Wachman, Sung-Yoon Lee

John Curtis Perry, also known as John Perry, (July 18, 1930 – March 1, 2025) was an East Asian and Oceanic studies professor and historian. He was a professor and chair of the history department at Carleton College. Later he became the Henry Willard Denison Professor of History at the Fletcher School of Law and Diplomacy, Tufts University. He was also the director of that school's Maritime Studies program and founding president of the Institute for Global Maritime Studies, until his retirement in 2014.

== Education ==
Perry attended Friends schools in Washington, DC and New York City, subsequently going to Yale College for his bachelor's degree in Chinese Studies, graduating in 1952. At Yale he also pursued a master of arts in Foreign Area Studies.

Later, he attended Harvard University for his PhD in history, concluding in 1962 with his thesis Great Britain and the Imperial Japanese Navy, 1858-1905. His doctoral advisors were Edwin O. Reischauer, a Japanologist, and Robert G. Albion, a maritime historian; both the leading scholars in their fields at the time.

== Career ==
From 1962 until 1966, Perry was Assistant Professor of History at Connecticut College, and from 1966 to 1980, he was Assistant Professor, Professor of History, and Director of the East Asian Studies Program at Carleton College. In 1980, he joined the Fletcher School of Law and Diplomacy, becoming the Henry Willard Denison Chair of History in 1981.

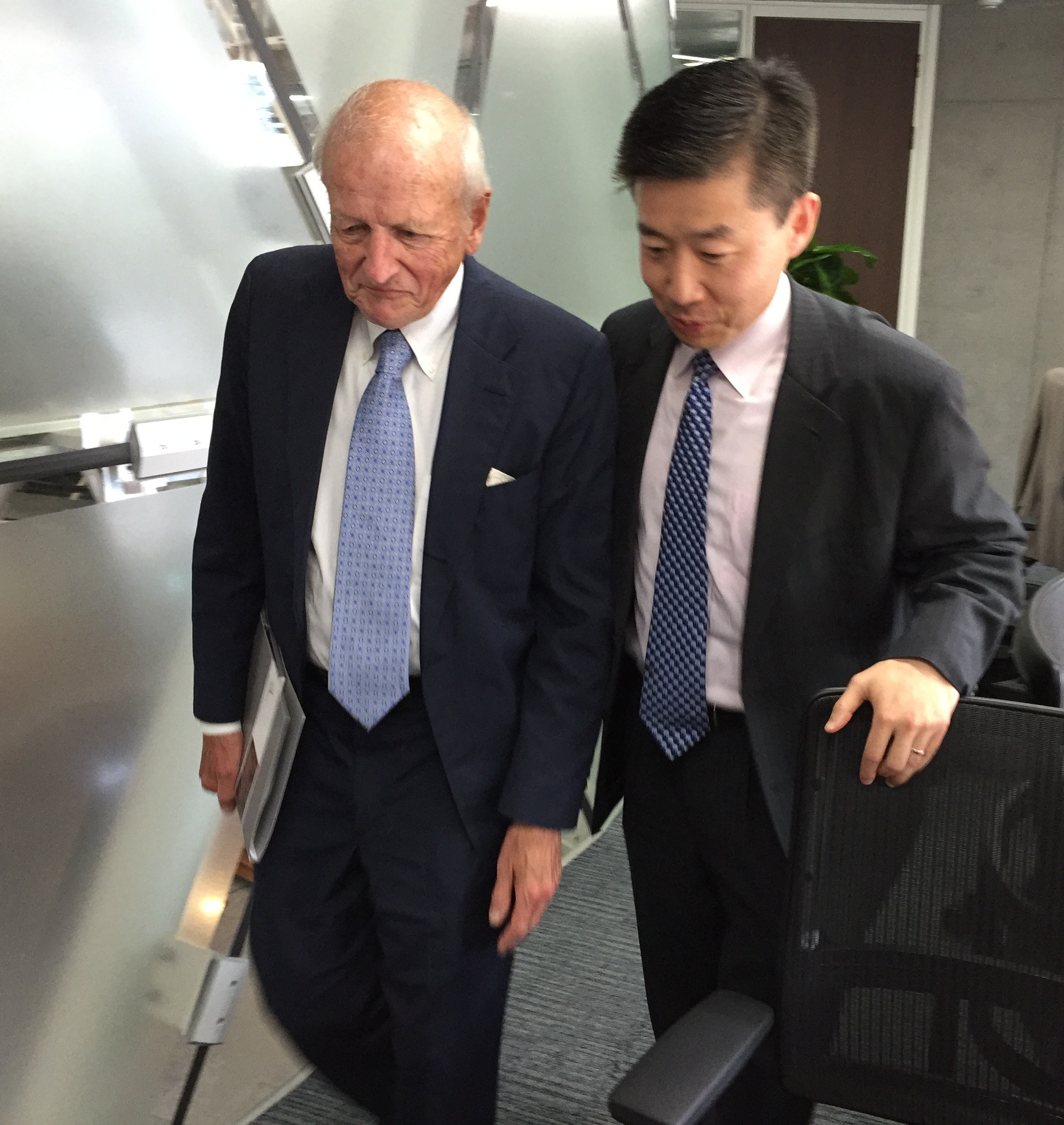
Perry and Sung-Yoon Lee in 2015

Perry was a visiting research associate at Harvard's Fairbank Center for Chinese Studies from 1976 to 1979, and at the Japan Institute (later renamed Edwin O. Reischauer Institute of Japanese Studies) from 1979 to 1980. Perry also taught at Waseda University in Tokyo and the International University of Japan.

In his early career, his teaching and research focus was American-East Asian relations, especially with Japan. In the early 2000s, he shifted his focus to maritime studies in order to explore the history of human interactions via the sea. From 1985 to 1997, he was the director of the North Pacific Program, and then director of the Maritime Studies program. He taught courses including Maritime History and Globalization and The International Relations of the China Seas.

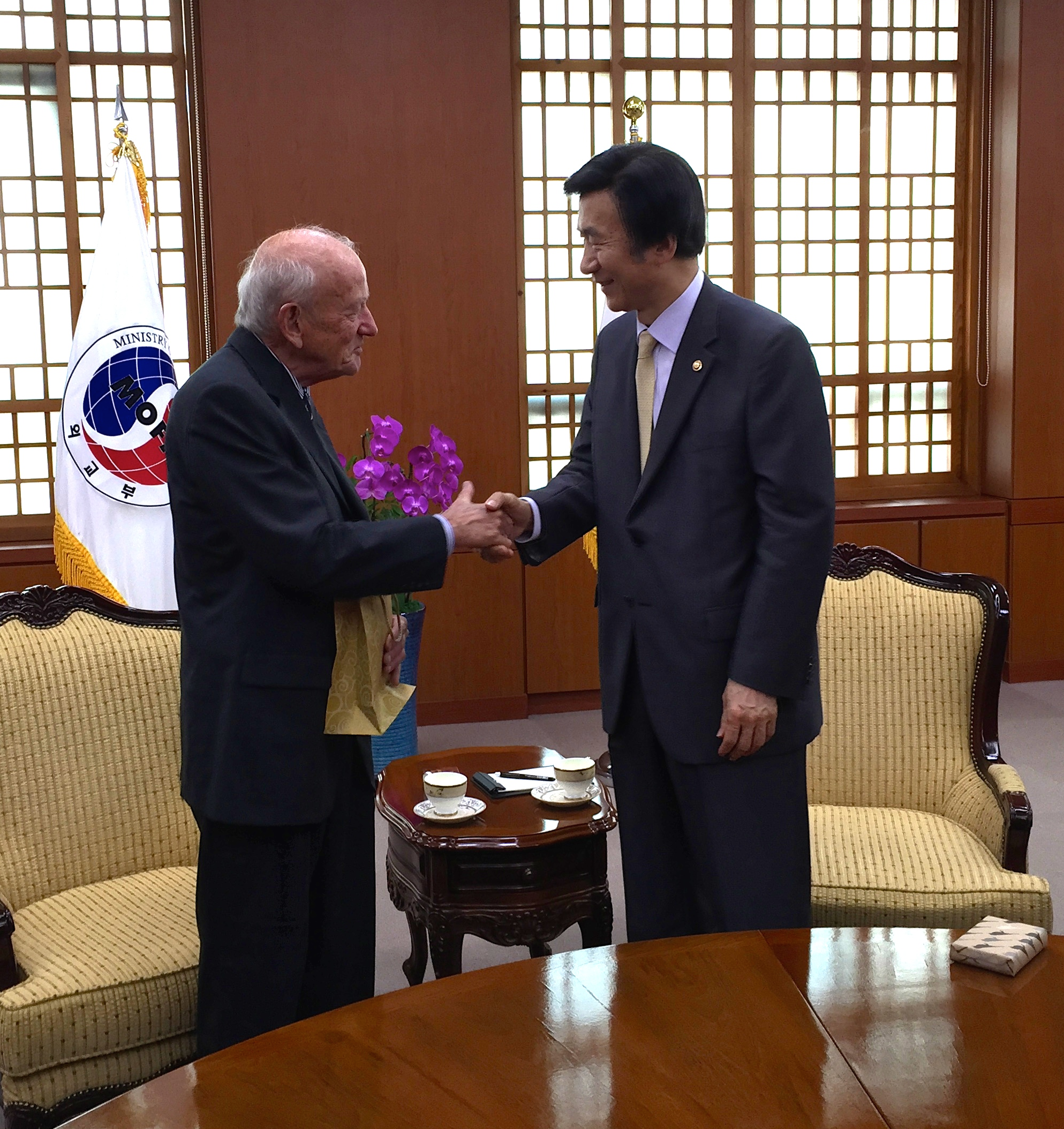
Perry meeting with the Minister of Foreign Affairs of Korea Yun Byung-se in 2015

Notable students of his include Alan M. Wachman and Sung-Yoon Lee with whom Perry developed a life-long mentor-mentee relationship.

Beginning in 1995, Perry took an interest in the Russian Tsar's family dynamics, partnering with Constantine Pleshakov in researching the Romanovs' family history from the youth of Alexander III in the 1860s to the death in 1960 of his last surviving daughter. Their research was published in a book entitled The Flight of the Romanovs: A Family Saga (1999) and it was the first book to provide a biography of the family as a whole. Perry and Pleshakov, at the invitation of the Russian government, attended in 1998 the burial of the remains of Tsar Nicholas II and his family.

Excerpt from John Curtis Perry's podcast episode The Austronesians
During his retirement, Perry converted the lectures of his graduate course on global maritime history into a podcast series titled Revolution at Sea.

Perry was the founding president of the Institute for Global Maritime Studies, a non-profit research organization. He served as IGMS' president from 2007 to 2014 and stayed on as Chair of the Board. He was a consultant to several organizations, including the Policy Planning Branch of the Ministry of Foreign Affairs of the Republic of Korea, the Japan Export Trade Promotion Organization (currently the Japan External Trade Organization, JETRO), and Rhumb Line LLC. He also served as a director of the Japan America Society of New Hampshire, and is a member of the Massachusetts Historical Society. He was a senior advisor and director of the Japan Society of Boston. Although Perry retired in 2015 from teaching, he continued to pursue other academic activities. That same year it was announced that he was finishing a book about the implausibility of Singapore's success. That book, titled Singapore: Unlikely Power was published in 2017 by Oxford University Press.

== Family ==
In 1957, Perry married Sarah Hollis French, of Farmington, Connecticut. They had five children and have ten grandchildren.

Perry died on March 1, 2025 in Massachusetts. He was 94.

== Honors ==
Ribbon

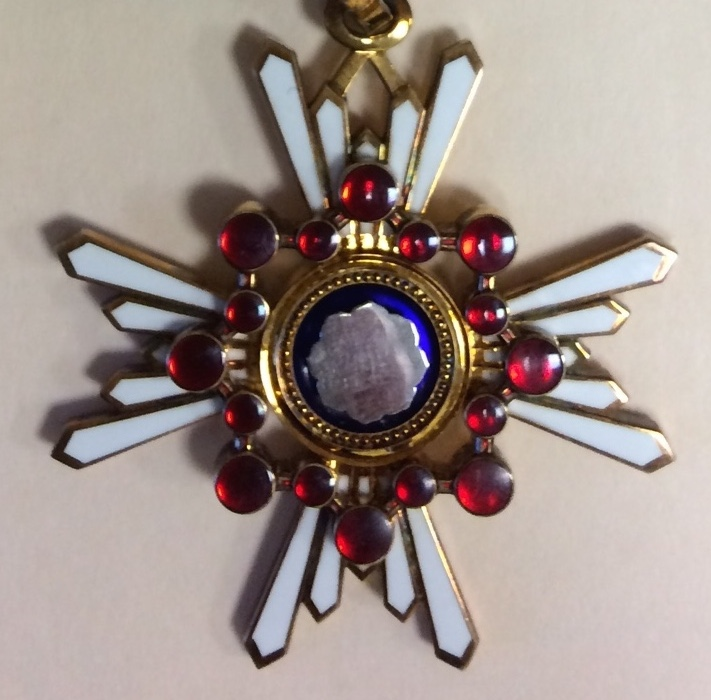
Medal

Order of the Sacred Treasure, Third Class

In 1991, the Japanese Government awarded Perry the imperial decoration of the Order of the Sacred Treasure, Third Class (Gold Rays with Neck Ribbon), for his contributions to American-Japanese relations.

In 2000, Fletcher students and friends established the John Curtis Perry Fellowship for a deserving Fletcher student.

In 2018 colleagues and students of Perry came together to publish a book in his honor, Eurasia’s Maritime Rise and Global Security: From the Indian Ocean to Pacific Asia and the Arctic. In it, Admiral (ret.) and Fletcher School Dean James G. Stavridis remarked that the book was created "in celebration" of Perry, with the book's editor Geoffrey F. Gresh further noting that the volume "emerged from a workshop on the future of the world's oceans hosted at the Fletcher School of Law and Diplomacy, Tufts University, in the Spring of 2015 to honor the legacy and groundbreaking work of John Curtis Perry".

== Writings ==
Perry was the author of six books. He was praised for his skillful, pithy, and enjoyable writing style to convey history to the reader. Historian Roger Dingman said that "Perry writes clearly, succinctly and wittily". Raymond A. Esthus compared Perry's style to "sumi-e, the Japanese paintings that portray a scene or suggest a world of feeling with a few skillful brush strokes". Clayton James said of Beneath the Eagle's Wings: Americans in Occupied Japan "It is a model for brevity, lucidity, coherence, balance, objectivity, and perceptiveness". Walter A. McDougall wrote of Perry, "He has a keen eye for [literary] images" and Roger Dingman commented, "He has an eye for the pithy quote and the illustrative incident".

=== The American occupation of Japan ===
==== Summary ====
In the book Beneath the Eagle's Wings: Americans in Occupied Japan (1980), Perry asserted that the post-WWII American occupation of Japan was a major success, despite the odds. Americans came into Japan full of vitality and energy, convinced of the superiority of their own culture and its suitability for Japan, and unencumbered by much knowledge of Japan's history or culture. These American characteristics might have been reasons for failure, but paradoxically the occupation was an extraordinary success: "a landmark in human history," Perry states.

However, despite how little Americans knew of the Japanese, the occupation policy actually did not clash head-on with Japanese ways of doing things. The nation was ruled through the Japanese government, making local military government units superfluous. The technique most widely used by occupation officials was hortatory: advice, counsel, and visits by experts invited to Japan by the supreme commander of the allied powers. This worked because of the extreme deference shown to the occupiers by the Japanese people and their leaders. Yet, although the occupation did remake the social, political and economic structures of Japan, its culture displayed a great degree of resilience. His stress is on the fascinating ways in which the occupiers and the occupied adjusted and adapted to their unprecedented encounter and, thanks to good will on both sides, made the Occupation's liabilities as insignificant as possible.

==== Reception ====
The book received generally positive reviews, considered as an engaging and illustrative work recommended for the general public. Esthus characterized the book as a "fine interpretive portrait of the American experience in occupied Japan", developed with "perception and literary grace", and Clayton James called it a "first rate" account on the occupation of Japan, "demonstrating masterful knowledge of the period and its literature," making it "a delightful brief study that both general readers and teachers in the field will appreciate." Alan Miller from The New Republic considered the work an "engaging" book that "doubtless will be a cornerstone for future historians intending to construct the comprehensive study of the Occupation". On the other hand, Dingman was critical of the work, pointing to a lack of research and citation of sources and the "painting" of a "rosy view of the American occupation", while he still positively evaluated Perry's literary skills. Differing from Dingman, McDonald at the Boston Globe, judged the book to be balanced, noting that "not everything was rosy" in Perry's narration, and further noted that "Perry almost apologizes for the fact that that this is not a 'scholarly' work, which could take volumes, but this book is precise enough and includes relevant details. By being readable enough for the layman (...) it will reach a greater audience, and it should. There are lessons for today and tomorrow in the history of the occupation".

=== History of US-East Asia relations (1784–1975) ===
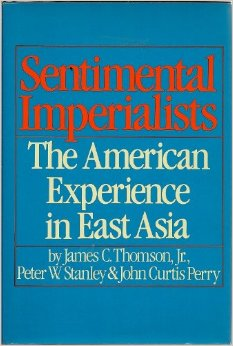
book cover for Sentimental Imperialists: The American Experience in East Asia

==== Summary ====
The book Sentimental Imperialists: The American Experience in East Asia (1981, co-authored with James Thomson and Peter W. Stanley) recounts the American experience of East Asia, from approximately 1784 until the fall of Saigon in 1975, discerning four major underlying patterns: competitive nationalism, mutual ethnocentrism, multilateral ignorance, and "a distinctive American sense of mission to 'do good' that has been the driving force behind American imperialism in East Asia".

The New York Times summarized the book as "a description and deflation of a series of illusions: the illusion of a commercial pot-of-gold at the end of a Pacific rainbow, the illusion that the United States had an attainable destiny to convert China to Christianity and modern democracy, the illusion that it was within American power to build a united, anti-Communist China after 1945 and the illusion that the Vietnam war was a test of America's dedication to freedom. Underlying all these illusions was the unstated assumption that Americans were active and Asians passive and that the outcome of any transaction was determined by what Americans thought and did. This assumption united the missionary enthusiasts of the 19th century, the exponents of the United States as China's political savior and guide to the 20th century, the McCarthyites searching for those who 'lost China,' and the Johnsonian visionaries dreaming of Mekong River Authorities while directing the fighting in Vietnam from computerized and air conditioned command centers."

==== Reception ====
Reviewers noted that three historians, established scholars respectively on American relations with China, the Philippines, and Japan, were beneficiaries of having been disciples of Edwin O. Reischauer and John K. Fairbank (who contributed a foreword), the leading historical interpreters of American relations with Japan and China respectively during the previous three decades. While the authors were East Asian specialists, they remained abreast of American history, being able to provide a balanced history of American-East Asian relations. It was also noted that this book was the first to provide a comprehensive overview of the topic; before then the history of US-East Asia relations having only been examined in fragments. The authors developed the book for the general reader, bringing a comprehensive text that shatters the American sentimentality and replaces it with a realistic historical portrait that highlights the multicultural complexity of East Asian countries. Several reviewers noted a lack of bibliography and footnotes, while others also recommended the book not only for the general public, but also for students, specialists, and policy makers.

Sentimental Imperialists received mostly positive reviews from academic and journalistic critics. It was welcomed by Kenneth Shewmaker as a "thoughtful overview" and "a masterpiece of condensation and multicultural analysis," and went on to say the authors "effectively combined their expertise to fashion an impressive multicultural study that cogently encapsulates two hundred years of American-East Asian relations". Cohen also evaluated the book positively, deeming several of its chapters "superb, (...) well-written, thoughtful, and informative", and Van Alstyne said he was inclined to "second the praise lavished upon it by a number of prominent writers quoted on the dust jacket." Kwok recommended that "policymakers and general readers ought to have this book on their shelves, after attentive perusal".

Elizabeth Peer from Newsweek deemed the book "impressive" and deserving of a "thoughtful audience". Daniel Yergin from The Boston Globe appraised the work as "lively and thoughtful", and "the result is a wise, literate, illuminating exploration that will be of considerable interest to the curious general reader as well as the specialist".Gaddis Smith writing for The New York Times lamented the lack of references, by noting that "so fine a book as this should not omit entirely what is often disparaged as 'scholarly paraphernalia.' ", but acclaimed the authors' use of "a great river of scholarship which they adapt, synthesize and condense with great skill". Smith and Leonard from The New York Times also characterized the book as a straightforward, cogent, readable and intelligent survey. The book was included in The New York Times Notable books of the year list, and was also recommended by The Washington Post.

=== American pioneering in the Pacific Ocean ===
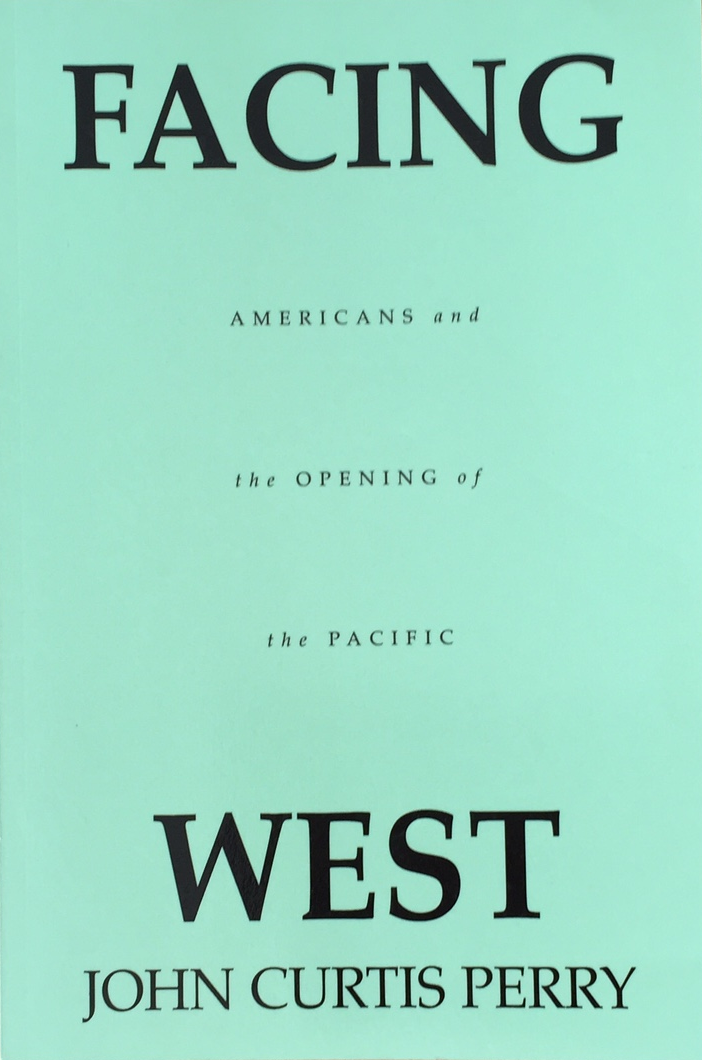
Book cover of Facing West: Americans and the Opening of the Pacific (1995)

==== Summary ====
In Facing West: Americans and the Opening of the Pacific (1995), Perry explored the attempts and successes by individuals in connecting the North Pacific with sail, steam, and aviation. He stated that the book was "concerned with people, not policy. The United States had no policy for bridging the Pacific [before WWII]." Furthermore, he mostly avoided referring to wars and geopolitical struggles, and rather focused on the vision, entrepreneurship, and courage of Americans who strove to bridge the Pacific. "American activity was largely private, not governmental; individual and not collective; sporadic, not systematic", Perry said, and Americans were propelled by the lure of profitable commerce and a sense of destiny to be the dominant force in the Pacific. Perry concluded that, "although Americans failed to grasp the Orient as they hoped, the power of the myth that pushed them there enabled them to do something bigger, something real. More than any other people, Americans pulled the North Pacific region together and created the essential framework for the long-anticipated Pacific era".

=== History of Singapore's rise ===
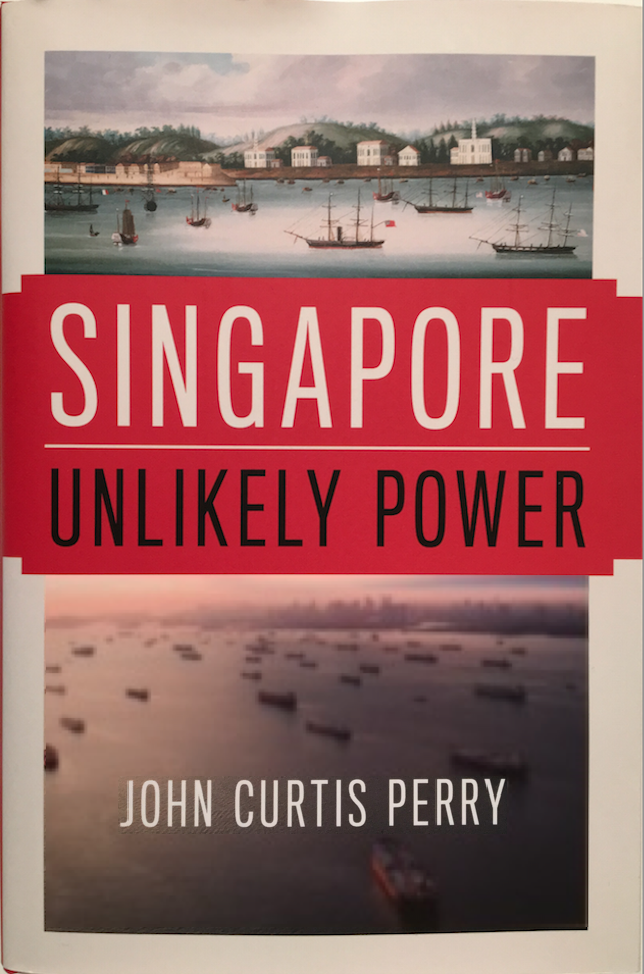
Singapore - Unlikely Power, 2017

==== Summary ====
In Singapore: Unlikely Power (Oxford University Press, 2017), Perry combined his scholarship on East Asia and maritime history to trace the history of Singapore from its origins as the medieval Malay port of Temasek to its modern prominence. He argued that its success owed less to natural resources, of which it has almost none beyond a sheltered deep-water port, than to its position on the Strait of Malacca, its openness to trade after the opening of the Suez Canal in 1869, its ethnic and cultural diversity, and pragmatic governance.

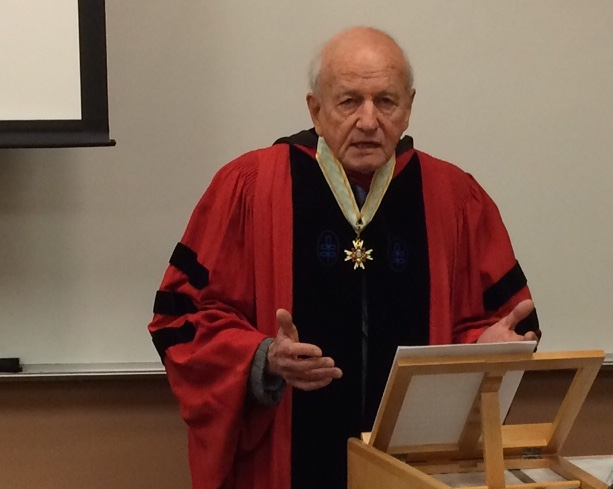
Perry in 2014, giving the final classroom lecture of his maritime history course before retiring from teaching

Founded as a modern port by Stamford Raffles in 1819 and independent from 1965, the city-state prospered under the authoritarian but technocratic leadership of Lee Kuan Yew, embracing British legal traditions, free trade, and a professional, corruption-free civil service. Perry presented Singapore not as a model to be copied but as a unique case offering lessons in adaptability, pragmatism, and reconciliation with its colonial and wartime past.

==== Reception ====
Elizabeth C. Economy, Director for Asia Studies at the Council on Foreign Relations praised the book calling it a "wonderful" book, and a "terrific and engaging read" she recommends to all. Economy also referred to it as "a very big book about a very small country" that "really helped us understand why Singapore is important and an unlikely power". She remarked that the book skillfully analyses the economic and structural factors that helped shape Singapore's success, and that what the "book also does so very well is to identify some really interesting figures in Singapore's history that also played an outsized role in determining the development path of the country". Kirkus reviews deemed the book a "brief, affectionate", and "compelling" portrait of the country, but also thought it "incomplete and surprisingly discursive". On the other hand, Daniel Moss from Bloomberg differed from Kirkus by characterizing the book as an "incredible historical and economic narrative".

== List of publications ==
=== Books ===
- Perry, John Curtis (2017). Singapore: Unlikely Power. Oxford University Press. ISBN 9780190469504. LCCN 2016022371.
- Perry, John Curtis; Pleshakov, Constantine (1999). The Flight of the Romanovs: A Family Saga. Basic Books. ISBN 978-0465024636.
- Perry, John Curtis (1995). Facing West: Americans and the Opening of the Pacific. Praeger. ISBN 978-0275949655.
  - Published in Japanese as "Nishi E!" 西へ！ アメリカ人の太平洋開拓史 (PHP研究所, 1998) ISBN 978-4569603247
- Thomson, James C.; Stanley, Peter W.; Perry, John Curtis (1981). Sentimental Imperialists: The American Experience in East Asia. Harper & Row. ISBN 978-0060142827.
- Perry, John Curtis (1980). Beneath the Eagle's Wings: Americans in Occupied Japan. Dodd Mead & Company. ISBN 978-0396078760.
- Perry, John Curtis; Smith, Bardwell L., eds. (1976). Essays on T'ang society: the interplay of social, political and economic forces. The Journal of Asian Studies. ISBN 978-9004047617.

=== Book chapters ===
- Perry, John C. (2007). "Imperial China and the Sea" (PDF). In Yoshihara, Toshi; Holmes, James R. (eds.). Asia looks seaward: power and maritime strategy. Praeger. ISBN 978-0813343556. Archived from the original (PDF) on January 26, 2012.
- Perry, John C. (1998). "Japan and the United States at War". In Borthwick, Mark (ed.). Pacific Century: The Emergence of Modern Pacific Asia. Westview Press. ISBN 978-0813346670.

=== Monographs ===
- Perry, John C.; Borgeson, Scott; Weitz, Rockford (2008). America's Deep Blue Highway: How Coastal Shipping Could Reduce Traffic Congestion, Lower Pollution, and Bolster National Security (PDF) (Report). Institute for Global Maritime Studies. Archived from the original (PDF) on February 22, 2016.

=== Academic articles ===
- Perry, John C. (2013). "Beyond the Terracentric: Maritime Ruminations" (PDF). The Fletcher Forum of World Affairs. 37. Archived from the original (PDF) on October 17, 2013.
- Perry, John C. (2011). "Oceanic Revolution and Pacific Asia". The Fletcher Forum of World Affairs. 35. Archived from the original on January 23, 2013.
- Perry, John C. (1996). "Great Britain and the Emergence of Japan as a Naval Power". Monumenta Nipponica. 21 (3/4): 305–321. doi:10.2307/2383375. JSTOR 2383375.
- Perry, John C. (Fall–Winter 1984). "Private philanthropy and foreign affairs: the case of John D. Rockefeller 3rd and Japan". Asian Perspective. 8 (2): 268–284. doi:10.1353/apr.1984.a920952. JSTOR 43738034. Archived from the original on March 24, 2024.
- Perry, John C. (1977). "The Architecture of Modernization in Meiji Japan". Japan Quarterly. 24 (4): 467. Archived from the original on March 24, 2025.
- Perry, John C. (1964). "The Battle off the Tayang, 17 September 1894". The Mariner's Mirror. 50 (4): 243–259. doi:10.1080/00253359.1964.10657787.

=== Short essays ===
- Perry, John C. (April 14, 2017). "The power of globalization: Singapore's economic rise". Oxford University Press. Archived from the original on November 16, 2025.
- Perry, John C. (March 24, 2015). "Lee Kuan Yew's Power of Forgiveness". The Wall Street Journal. New York, USA. Archived from the original on February 4, 2026.
- Perry, John C.; Weitz, Rockford; Borgerson, Scott (December 23, 2007). "Open a new highway - on the sea". The Christian Science Monitor. Archived from the original on October 7, 2025.
- Perry, John C.; Weitz, Rockford; Borgerson, Scott (January 2, 2007). "The Deep Blue Highway". The New York Times. Archived from the original on October 7, 2025.
- Perry, John C.; Weitz, Rockford; Borgerson, Scott (July 10, 2006). "Navigating the Swirling Currents of Change". The Straits Times. Singapore.
- Perry, John C. (February 4, 1994). "Russia as the great Asian power". Moscow News.
- Perry, John C. (August 31, 1990). "Siberia Longs for a Connection Across the Pacific : Soviet Union: Vladivostok and its region smolder over their isolation from Moscow. We should build a bridge of sorts". Los Angeles Times. Archived from the original on March 24, 2025.
- Perry, John C. (1990). "Dateline North Korea: A Communist Holdout". Foreign Policy. 80 (80): 172–191. doi:10.2307/1148581. JSTOR 1148581.
- Perry, John C. (May 22, 1985). "Modern Japan's lagging "frontier"". The Christian Science Monitor. Archived from the original on October 7, 2025.
- Perry, John C. (1985). "Asia's Telectronic Highway". Foreign Policy. 59 (59): 40–58. doi:10.2307/1148599. JSTOR 1148599.
- Perry, John C. (March 4, 1981). "Please, Japan, Return The Favor: Occupy Us'". The New York Times. p. A1.

=== Podcasts ===
- Revolution at sea, 2020-2021. CC BY-SA
