= The Sister: The extraordinary story of Kim Yo Jong, the most powerful woman in North Korea =

2023 biography of Kim Yo Jong by Sung-Yoon Lee

- Author: Sung-Yoon Lee
- Subject: Kim Yo Jong, North Korea
- Genre: Non-fiction, Biography, History
- Publisher: Macmillan (UK) / PublicAffairs (Hachette) (US)
- Publication date: 2023
- Media type: Print, eBook, Audio Book
- Pages: 304
- ISBN: 9781668635612 9781529073539
- OCLC: 1389274587
- Dewey Decimal: 951.93052092

The Sister: The extraordinary story of Kim Yo Jong, the most powerful woman in North Korea is a 2023 biography of Kim Yo Jong, the sister, closest deputy, and potential successor to North Korea's leader Kim Jong Un. It was subsequently published in the United States with the title The Sister: North Korea's Kim Yo Jong, the Most Dangerous Woman in the World. It is written by Sung-Yoon Lee, a scholar of Korean and East Asian studies. It is regarded as the first book to offer an in-depth portrait of its subject.

The book received generally positive reviews, praised for being an authoritative, meticulous, and engaging portrait of Kim Yo Jong. It was also valued for the insights it offered into the Kim family's domestic machinations and geopolitical tactics for regime survival. Reviewers also noted that the book had to contend with a dearth of information available on Kim Yo Jong, with mixed opinions on whether the attention to small details were astute observations or unnecessary speculation.

The Sister portrays Kim Yo Jong as the second most powerful person after her brother. She leads her country's foreign policy, and heads the agencies in charge of internal political propaganda and of implementing policy and appointing personnel. The book warns against mistaking her femininity for weakness or amenability, and describes her as cold and ruthless.

Lee asserts that North Korea is the only of the world's nine nuclear states that has no checks or balances on the leadership; that it has a bellicose stance against other countries including South Korea and the United States; and that it is extremely repressive to its own people. He concludes that this makes Kim Yo Jong one of the most powerful and dangerous leaders in the contemporary world.

Lee posits her to be best positioned among the Kim family members to succeed her brother, especially if he were incapacitated before his own children had grown up. Were she to become the supreme leader, her personality and track record suggest that she would not be a reformist, and would rule her country with an iron fist much like her predecessors.

== Historical and geopolitical background ==
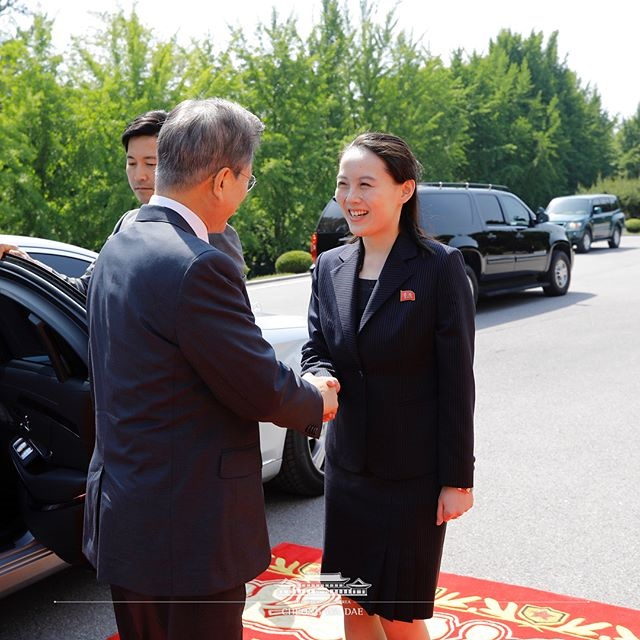
South Korean President Moon Jae-in greets North Korean Kim Yo Jong during the May 2018 inter-Korean summit

Korea became divided between North and South at the end of World War II. The South pursued a market economy that eventually led to prosperity, first under military dictatorships, and later as a democracy. The North was established as a communist state by Kim Il Sung. He was succeeded by his son Kim Jong Il in 1994, and his grandson Kim Jong Un in 2011. All the while the vast majority of North Korean populace lived in extreme repression, poverty, and famine.

With their opposite political and economic regimes, the two Koreas were at odds from the outset, both vying to govern of the entire peninsula. The North attempted to conquer the South in the Korean War, but was thwarted by the intervention of the United States. For decades the North continued to be belligerent and threatening to the South and the international community. North Korea successfully developed nuclear weapons, in pursuit of regime preservation and possibly to cow South Korea into submission in the future.

The North's nuclear capabilities, paired with its bellicosity, made the regime a concern to the international community. Further, the country was closed to the outside world, with little information coming in or out. This heightened the uncertainty of how dangerous and how erratic might its leadership be, and how should the international community contend with it. Given the uniquely hereditary and authoritarian nature of the regime, outside observers paid special attention to the ruling Kim family.

In 2023, when The Sister was published, Kim Jong Un was 39 and had been ruling North Korea for 12 years. He was known to have at least a ten-year-old daughter, whom he brought to some public events. Kim Yo Jong, Kim Jong Un's only full sister, was 35. (Note: Ages are approximate since the regime has never released these details. Jong Un and Yo Jong's father Kim Jong Il had children with multiple women, so they have multiple half-siblings.)

== Contents ==
=== Synopsis ===
The Sister offers a profile of the enigmatic Kim Yo Jong (b. 1987), sister to Kim Jong Un, the leader of North Korea. Both siblings are the third generation in the Kim dynasty, preceded by their father Kim Jong Il, and their grandfather and founder of North Korea, Kim Il Sung.

The book constructs a biography of its subject combining three layers of history: of her country, of her family, and of her own life. In it, Sung-Yoon Lee argues that Kim Yo Jong is a key figure of North Korea's nuclear, despotic, and opaque regime. She rose to become Kim Jong Un's closest aide and deputy. She had great influence in the regime's decision making, including in the control of the nuclear weapons. And she was seen as a strong contender to succeeding her brother.

=== Themes ===
==== Emergence of North Korea ====
The book explores the historical context of the 20th century partition of the Korean peninsula, and the communist rule that ensued in the North under the Kim family. It describes the totalitarian regime's foundations and its efforts to endure.

==== Kim dynastic rule ====
The Sister also examines Yo Jong's broader family history, the so-called Mount Paektu bloodline; Lee explores both the real history and the propaganda image the Kim family created.

The book includes a detailed family tree to help the reader make sense of all the familial relationships.

==== Myth-building of a semi-divine dynasty ====
The Sister shines a light on the "bold and blatant falsehoods" upon which three generations of the ruling Kim family have built a set of myths to make them semi-divine in the eyes of the populace. That includes hiding "dark secrets" from the populace that would otherwise tarnish the propaganda image of the Kims, upon which the survival of the regime depends.

The regime bans religion and persecutes any known practitioners. However, Kim Il Sung's parents were Christian (and her mother a deaconess). North Korea relegates to the lowest class in the regime's caste system any families with links to Japan, as they are deemed disloyal. However, Kim Jong Un's and Yo Jong's mother Ko Yong Hui was born in Japan. The regime punishes any family who had a member leave the country without permission. However, Kim Jong Un's own aunt defected to the United States in 1998. The book also notes how the Kims live a rich lifestyle that is infamous internationally but also kept hidden to their own people.

These would be unremarkable in other parts of the world, but in North Korea they make entire families guilty by association. The regime deprives them of access to resources and life opportunities, and may even send them to a gulag for hard labor.

==== Kim Yo Jong's rise to prominence ====
The Sister charts Kim Yo Jong's own life in the context of her country's and family's history. Her first public appearance was in 2011, but she remained mostly unknown. She was first mentioned by name in the North Korean media in 2014 but remained a largely background figure, and even as she rose to greater prominence, North Korean state media had not officially identified her as Kim Jong Un's sister as of the book's publication. She gained public notoriety in 2018 by leading her country's delegation at the Winter Olympics in Pyeongchang, South Korea. From then on and until 2023 (the book's publication) Lee chronicles in detail all her public appearances: the inter-Korean summits of April 2018, May 2018, September 2018, and the North Korea–United States summits of 2018 in Singapore, and 2019 in Hannoi.

==== Kim Yo Jong's rise to power ====
The book follows her professional steps and rise to power. Since at least 2014 Yo Jong led the Workers' Party's Propaganda and Agitation Department, in charge of indoctrinating North Koreans with state ideology. In 2020 she become the de facto head of the Organization and Guidance Department, a powerful organ that monitors personnel at all levels, giving her the authority to have anyone investigated and punished. She was also appointed an alternate member of the Politburo and member of the State Affairs Commission by which her brother delegated foreign policy to her. Lee highlights that in June 2020, Kim Jong Un unofficially elevated his sister to deputy leader, whereby, according to Lee, "her words were his words, vetoable only by him."

==== The regime's diplomatic ploys ====
The Sister also follows the diplomatic stratagems the Kims engage in, especially with South Korea and the United States. Lee argues that early in this period of public notoriety of Kim Yo Jong, North Korea was on a "charm offensive". The Kim siblings used Yo Jong's femininity as a ploy to yet again dupe foreign leaders in to believing that the country's leadership was becoming more reasonable. Lee points out how Kim Yo Jong and Kim Jong Un had learned well from their forebears the playbook of duplicitous diplomacy, making some foreign leaders (chief among them then-South Korean President Moon Jae-in) too quick to seek appeasement and offer concessions at the mirage of a gentler North Korea. However, the North eventually again turned belligerent and stopped meeting with foreign leaders. From that point Kim Yo Jong continued to be outspoken, often making vitriolic statements published in North Korean media.

=== Conclusions ===
Podcast interview
Sung-Yoon Lee Interview by John Curtis Perry, in an episode of Revolution at Sea

Lee cautions against underestimating the Kims. The oddities of the North Korean regime and its leadership can cause outside observers to be condescending (as has been the case with several American administrations). Further, Lee also cautions against being credulous when the regime periodically appears to seek denuclearization negotiations or improved diplomatic relations; it is likely a ploy to extract concessions, as they have done in the past.

The book suggests that Yo Jong's feminity can also be mistaken for weakness or amenability. But to patronize the North Korean leadership is to fatally underestimate it. She is ambitious, smart, and ruthless. Inside her country, she "make[s] men twice her age tremble and grovel." Outside her country she is a cool and adept player in North Korea's diplomatic and geopolitical gamesmanship.

Since coming to the public view in 2018, Yo Jong "has remained her despotic nation's chief censor, spokeswoman, mocker and threat-and-malice dispenser." She is "one of the most powerful leaders in the contemporary world, with her nation's foreign policy at her fingertips, and with unfettered access to her nuclear button-controlling brother." Indeed, as the subtitle of the book says she may be the most dangerous woman in the world.

Kim Yo Jong is well-placed to wield power for decades, whether as Kim Jong Un's closest deputy or as his successor. Her existence buttresses the regime and its long-term survival. She is very much part of the family, adept at internal repression and international extortion and vitriol. There is a distinct possibility that she would succeed her brother, becoming the first female supreme leader; the world's first "nuclear despotess". Change would not come at her hands.

Normally being a female would be a hurdle to becoming the leader of a "chauvinistic, male-dominated culture and society," but Lee feels that if Kim Jong Un were incapacitated while his own descendants were not yet adults, Kim Yo Jong would nevertheless be able to rule. This would be by virtue of the divine and royal aura that the decades-long propaganda has bestowed upon the direct descendants of the country's founder Kim Il Sung.

The book also underscores the importance of taking seriously the regime's danger to international security. North Korea is the only of the world's nine nuclear states that has no checks or balances on its leadership. The regime continues to threaten South Korea, Japan, and the United States. In particular the Kim regime sees as its core mission the reduction of the South to North's domination.

Despite Yo Jong's power, Lee also casts a shadow of doubt on her future. Lee's book stresses that the only person in North Korea who is truly secure is the leader. Being part of the Kim family did not stop Kim Jong Un from having his half brother assassinated and his uncle executed. Kim Jong Un purged many of his father's close aides upon succeeding him, and history might repeat itself once Kim Jong Un's daughter grows up. Lee wonders how this possibility influences Kim Yo Jong's calculus for her own survival.

== Reception ==
External videos
- The Sister presentation and , conversation with policy director Jonathan Corrado at the Korea Society in New York.

=== Reviews ===
The Sister received mostly positive reviews, and is considered the first authoritative book on its subject.

Rachel Aspden writing for The Guardian called it a "detailed, insightful study" and vivid account adding that "Lee is excellent on the regime's reliance on suppressing, distorting and manipulating information". Similarly, Kirkus Reviews called it "a vivid portrait of a ruthless, egocentric woman driven by an unrelenting sense of entitlement and destiny." The Economist deemed it a book written in exuberant prose offering insights into the workings of the only hereditary communist government. Writing for The Australian, Paul Monk called Lee's work "absorbing and dramatic." It is "clearly and colourfully written and tells a dramatic story as eye-popping as any fiction." The Korea JoongAng Daily called it "a fascinating, authoritative account of the mysterious world of North Korea and its ruling dynasty". Katie Stallard writing for The Times Literary Supplement called the book "riveting", as did Melanie Kirkpatrick writing for The Wall Street Journal. Kirkpatrick added that the book is "a chilling saga of the family dynasty that continues to oppress the North Korean people. It is replete with the sex, lies, ambition, betrayal and murders that characterize the Kim family's style of governance."

Anthony Ruggiero writing for Foreign Policy noted Lee "expertly describes her function as the regime's de facto deputy leader." U.S. Ambassador Joseph R. DeTrani writing for The Cipher Brief praised Lee's meticulous study of his subject resulting in a book that it is a "fascinating read" and "a powerful and well-researched commentary on the brutality of the Kim family dynasty and the unique – and dangerous – role of Kim Yo Jong". Shelf Awareness, a trade publication for book sellers, said Lee delivers an authoritative summary of the Kim siblings' working relationship, and that The Sister is a "fascinating study that will alarm, mesmerize, and horrify in equal measure".

Critics including those from The Economist, Wall Street Journal, and New York Times concurred that a fundamental limitation the book contended with was the lack of access to information. However, marshaling all what was publicly known into a single, well-written work, was a worthwhile and illuminating effort. The Economist noted that Lee was especially good at "piecing together clues from afar", and Anna Fifield writing for Chatham House concluded the resulting book made for "the most complete portrait possible" though it "reveals nothing new about Kim Yo Jong".

Among others, The Economist felt that given the scarcity of information, the book paid copious attention to small details (i.e.: the makeup, mannerisms, or attire used by the subject during a summit) and regarded as speculative the book's attempts to derive greater meaning from them. The Diplomatic Courier dubbed it "kremlinology on steroids". On the other hand, Edward Howell writing for Chatham House's International Affairs deemed that Lee's attention to detail was of "great literary value".

Joshua Huminski writing for The Diplomatic Courier called the book a "truly fascinating" and "engrossing story told with verve," that offers deep insights into North Korea, but he lamented that while Kim Yo Jong's rise is woven throughout the overarching narrative, she comes across as a minor character within the much broader story offered by the book. On the other hand, Kirkpatrick found that the historical context the book provided was helpful in painting a compelling picture of the Kim Yo Jong, broader Kim family, and regime.

Similarly, Edward Howell praised the breadth of the book calling it the best account "to dissect the motivations behind the North Korean regime and those of its ruling dynasty," fulfilling "a bigger objective of uncovering the workings of a regime that has been misunderstood by governments and whose image has been peppered by stereotypical analyses in the popular imagination".

Some critics concurred with the book's assertion that North Korea is often relegated to a cartoonish image that belies the capability of its leaders and brutality of the regime on its own people, and the importance of taking the regime seriously. Reviewer David Tizzard criticized the book for itself portraying its subject as a "cartoonishly evil supervillain".

Oliver Farry writing for the Irish Times noted that "much of Lee's analysis is sound and his hawkishness on North Korea has often been proven right," but pointed that a weak point of the book was the lack of nuance in informing the reader about South Korean politics.

John Knight writing for The New York Times said "Lee's book is a timely, important treatment of a dangerous leader, and a sincere warning not to underestimate her," a conclusion also shared by multiple other reviewers.

=== Recommended audiences ===
Writing for Australian Strategic Policy Institute Robert Wihtol recommended The Sister as "essential reading for North Korea watchers." Similarly, Max Boot called it "an essential reading to understand the nature of the world's most tyrannical and reclusive regime."

Paul Monk recommended it for the general public, given the threats to international peace the regime poses, and the insights the book offers:

Why should you read this book? There are several reasons. To begin with, far too many Australians are ignorant of Korea, North and South. Second, North Korea is as rogue a state as they come. It is a true mafia state, which has run a protection racket against South Korea and the outside world for decades, extorting billions and billions of dollars in aid, which it has used only to buttress both its brutal rule and its arsenal. That needs to be absorbed into our common understanding, because we live in an increasingly ominous strategic climate and North Korea is a deeply disturbing actor in the world of 21st century geopolitics. But you might consider reading it simply because it is an absorbing and dramatic book to read and can be read quickly, since it is clearly and colourfully written and tells a dramatic story as eye-popping as any fiction.

David Tizzard writing for NK News, regarded the book "an easy and compelling read [for the general public]", while deeming that long-time observers of the regime would not find new insights. On the other hand, Jonathan Corrado, policy director at the Korea Society in New York, called it a book "that is good for both newcomers and experts; everyone can learn something [from it]."

Melanie Kirkpatrick endorsed the book to her readers, adding that "those who would benefit most from reading The Sister are the 25 million citizens of North Korea, who are taught to worship the Kim family but know next to nothing about it. Here's a subversive thought: One of the radio stations that broadcasts into the North—Voice of America, perhaps, or an escapee-run station in Seoul—could broadcast excerpts from the book. If North Koreans knew the truth about the family that has oppressed them for 70 years, who knows what they might be inspired to accomplish."

=== Accolades ===
The book was included in The Guardian's "2023 in books: highlights for the year ahead." Upon the book launching in the UK, the newspaper also named it book of the day.

Booklist, a publication of the American Library Association that provides critical reviews of books, gave The Sister a star, "assigned by Booklist editors to indicate that the title is exceptional in its genre or format."

The Cipher Brief, a website dedicated to national security news and analysis, awarded it "a prestigious four out of four trenchcoats".

The Australian, and New Zealand's National Business Review listed it as one of the best books of 2023.

== Research methodology, sources, and challenges ==
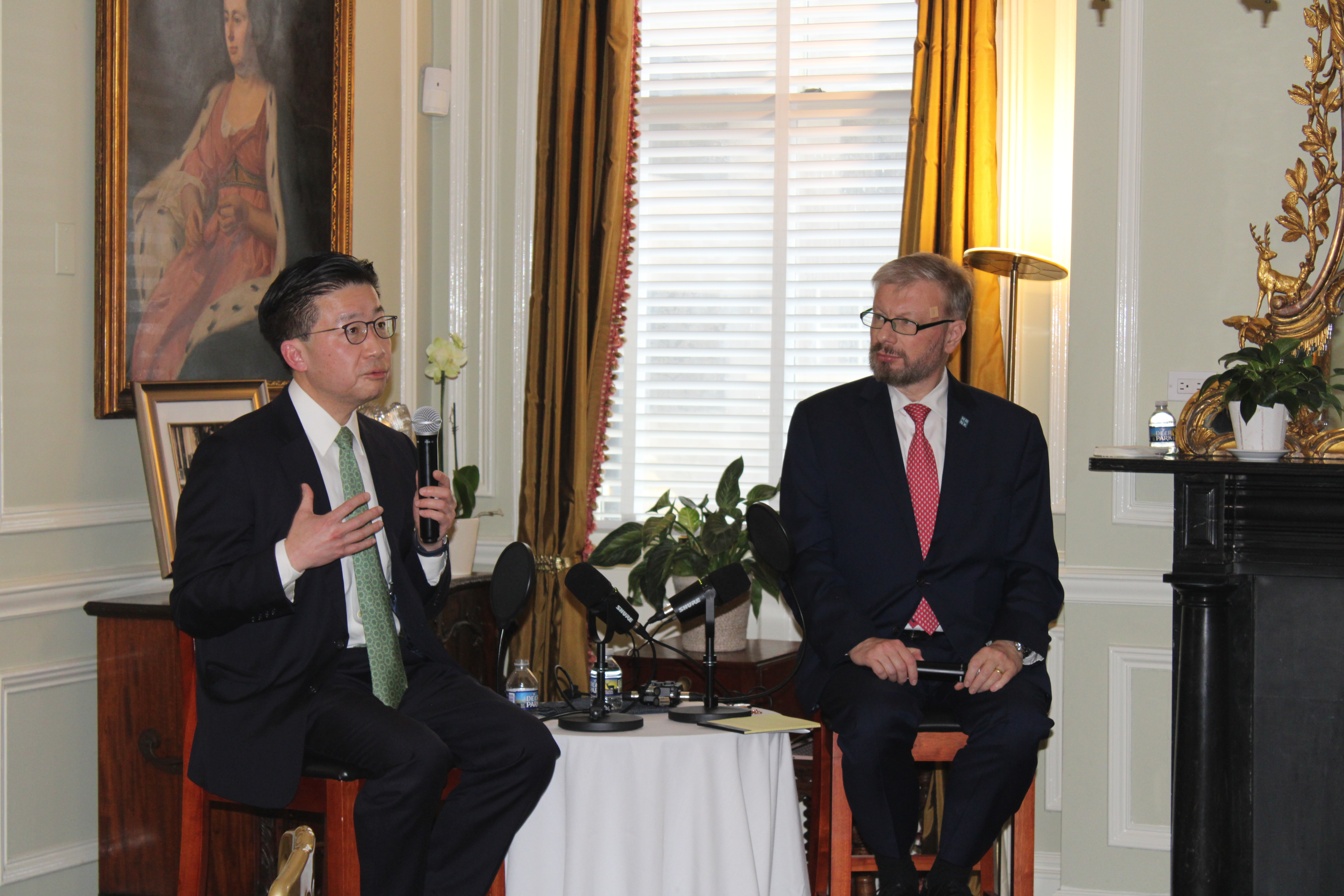
Sung-yoon Lee and Greg Scarlatoiu have a conversation about The Sister in an event organized by the Committee for Human Rights in North Korea in 2024, in Washington D.C.

Sung-Yoon Lee is a U.S.-based political scientist and historian specializing in North Korea and East Asia. Before writing this book he studied, taught, and wrote about North Korea and the Kim family for over 20 years. He also had advised the U.S. government on Korean issues. Lee wrote the book from 2020 to 2023.

Lee acknowledged that North Korea is the most opaque nation in the world, with its regime stringently limiting the information that its own population has access to, as well as the information that is shared with the outside world. Further, North Korea is adept at "strategic deception;" sending out mixed and misleading signals. This included the regime being very secretive about sharing basic biological information about its leadership (even birth dates). Overall, the dearth of information coming out of North Korea made it especially difficult to establish the facts.

In the face of these limitations, and with "great difficulty" Lee combined multiple sources and research techniques to paint the most complete portrait possible.

Lee compiled all of the publicly available information on Kim Yo Jong, which included "every single reference" to her in the media in English, Japanese, Korean (both from the North and South), and Chinese (mainland China and Taiwan). He credited graduate research assistants in this part of the work, including native Chinese speakers.

He conducted numerous interviews, including with defector North Koreans with elite backgrounds and positions within the regime, several of whom had met Kim Yo Jong and allowed lee to "glean some insights into her personality".

As a native Korean speaker, Lee also reviewed North Korean official statements, including the dozens issued by Kim Yo Jong.

He watched hundreds of hours of North Korean videos, including all her appearances during the summits of 2018 with the leaders of China, Singapore, South Korea, and the United States. He compared depictions of Yo Jong for the domestic audience with North Korean broadcasts for international consumption. He paid close attention to the subtleties such as body language and facial expressions to divine power dynamics and personality.

== Publication history ==
Publication history of The Sister
Title	Publication date	Country	Publisher	Translator	ISBN	Reference
The Sister: The extraordinary story of Kim Yo Jong, the most powerful woman in North Korea.	June 15, 2023	United Kingdom	Macmillan	N/A	9781529073539, 9781529073546	
Pohjois-Korean prinsessa: Diktaattorin sisar Kim Yo Jong. 29 August 2023.	August 29, 2023	Finland	Bazar	Timo Korppi	9789523764507	
The Sister: North Korea's Kim Yo Jong, the Most Dangerous Woman in the World. 3 April 2023. ISBN 978-1-6686-3561-2.	September 12, 2023	United States	PublicAffairs (Hachette)	N/A	9781541704121, 9781529073546	
Irmã A história extraordinária de Kim Yo-Jong, a mulher mais poderosa da Coreia do Norte.	January 2024	Portugal	Vogais (Penguin Books)	Manuel Santos Marques	9789897873614	
De Zus: Het verhaal van het meesterbrein achter Kim Jong-un.	March 19, 2024	Netherlands	Harper Collins Holland	Caspar Wijers	9789402770797	
Die Schwester: Die Geschichte der gefährlichsten Frau der Welt.	May 6, 2024	Germany	Hoffmann und Campe	Alexander Weber	9783455017328	
La hermanísima: La mano negra de Corea del Norte.	February 4, 2026	Spain	Malpaso Ediciones	Manuel Manzano	9788412955880, 9788412955897	

== See also ==
- Sung-Yoon Lee bibliography
