= Tsung-Tung Chang =

Taiwanese-German economist and Sinologist

Tsung-Tung Chang (Chinese: 張聰東; pinyin: Zhāng Cōngdōng; 1930–2000) was a Taiwanese-German economist and Sinologist.

== Biography ==
Chang was born in a village near Taichung in Taiwan in 1930. He acquired a Bachelor of Arts degree in economics from Taihoku Imperial University in the 1940s. In 1956 he moved to Frankfurt am Main, where in February 1961 he received his doctorate degree. He then worked as an employee at the Federal Statistical Office in Wiesbaden. During this time, he became a German citizen.

In 1967, Otto Karow, the chair for East Asian philology and cultural studies at the Johann Wolfgang Goethe University, hired Chang as a Chinese lecturer. Here Chang began to study Chinese oracle bone inscriptions, which he submitted to Karow in 1970 as a dissertation. This was the first major work in a Western language on the subject. When the professorship for Sinology was re-established in 1973 as part of the reorganization of the university, Chang was appointed professor.

Chang conducted research in the fields of Chinese paleography and classical philosophy, and in the 1980s he conducted intensive Sino-Indo-European lexical studies. Under his leadership, the China Institute, which went under in the Second World War, was re-established as a registered association. With a series of lectures, exhibitions and concerts, he succeeded in building on the legacy of his predecessors Richard Wilhelm and Erwin Rousselle. Chang retired in 1999, and died shortly thereafter.

== Bibliography ==
- Tsung-Tung Chang: Die chinesische Volkswirtschaft: Grundlagen — Organisation — Planung. VS Verlag für Sozialwissenschaften, 1965
- Tsung-Tung Chang: Die Entwicklung der festlandchinesischen Landwirtschaft aus der Sicht der chinesischen Regierung. Westdeutscher Verlag, 1961
- Tsung-Tung Chang: Der Kult der Shang-Dynastie im Spiegel der Orakelinschriften : eine paläographische Studie zur Religion im archaischen China. Harrassowitz, 1970
- Tsung-Tung Chang: Metaphysik, Erkenntnis und praktische Philosophie im Chuang-Tzu: zur Neu-Interpretation und systematischen Darstellung der klassischen chinesischen Philosophie. Klostermann, 1982
- Tsung-Tung Chang (January 1988), "Indo-European Vocabulary in Old Chinese: A New Thesis on the Emergence of Chinese Language and Civilization in the Late Neolithic Age", Sino-Platonic Papers (in German), no. 7
- Tsung-Tung Chang (January 1988), "Indo-European Vocabulary in Old Chinese: A New Thesis on the Emergence of Chinese Language and Civilization in the Late Neolithic Age", Sino-Platonic Papers, no. 7http://www.sino-platonic.org/complete/spp007_old_chinese.pdf
