= Henry Willard Denison =

American judge

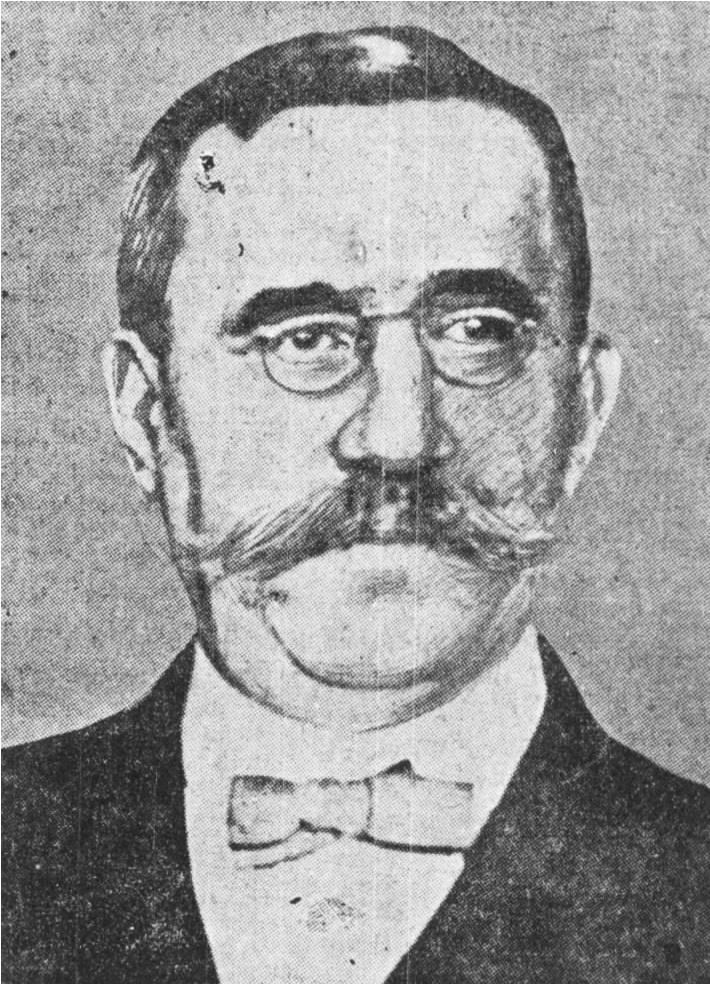
- The Boston Globe, July 3, 1914
- Born: May 11, 1846; Guildhall, Vermont, United States
- Died: July 3, 1914 (aged 68); Tokyo, Japan
- Occupation: Lawyer

Henry Willard Denison (May 11, 1846 – July 3, 1914) was an American diplomat and lawyer, active in Meiji period Japan.

== Biography ==
Denison was born in Guildhall, Vermont, and spent his early years in Lancaster, New Hampshire. He was a graduate of Columbia University, and went to George Washington University to study law in 1868, but did not graduate before he left for Japan in 1869 while working as a clerk for the Revenue and Customs Department in Washington D.C. In an 1875 letter he indicates he worked in the U.S. Treasury Department from 1864-1869.

In 1869, Denison was appointed Vice Consul at the United States Consulate at Yokohama, Japan, where his duties were primarily to serve as public prosecutor in the consulate court. At the time, the Japanese government's jurisdiction over foreigners in Japan was limited by the extraterritoriality provisions of the unequal treaties. On July 14, 1875, he wrote U.S. Minister John A. Bingham, whom he and his wife knew well, indicating that he wanted help in securing a position with the Japanese government, preferable in the Ministry of Finance or in the Foreign Office. His contract expired in 1876, but at the recommendation of American Minister John A. Bingham, he stayed on in Yokohama to practice law. Denison came to the notice of the Japanese government for his skill as a lawyer, and in 1880, at the recommendation of the American Minister Bingham], he accepted a post as a foreign advisor to the Japanese government. He was immediately tasked the providing an explanation on the meaning of the Elements of International Law a book on international law that was widely used in Asia during that time.

Although the position of foreign adviser was normally for a three- or five-year contract, Denison remained as a legal advisor to the Japanese Ministry of Foreign Affairs, until his death in 1914.

As legal adviser, he worked closely with Ōkuma Shigenobu and Mutsu Munemitsu towards the revision of the unequal treaties and elimination of extraterritoriality. He also wrote legal opinions in defense of the Japanese position in the First Sino-Japanese War (1894–1895) and assisting in the drafting of the Treaty of Shimonoseki. However, for his failure to predict the Triple Intervention, which cost Japan much of its territorial gains in that war, he came under strong criticism from hardliners in the military. He was supported by Mutsu Munemitsu and Itō Hirobumi

He also served as a Japanese judge in the Permanent Court of Arbitration at The Hague along with Ichiro Motono. Denison subsequently assisted Komura Jutaro in negotiating the Anglo-Japanese Alliance. During the Russo-Japanese War (1904–1905), he travelled with Kaneko Kentarō to the United States, and assisted in the drafting of the Treaty of Portsmouth.

Denison suffered a stroke in late June 1914 and was hospitalized at St. Luke's International Hospital and died on July 3. He was given a state funeral on July 6, attended by the American Ambassador to Japan, George W. Guthrie. His grave is at the Aoyama Cemetery in Tokyo and significantly not in the foreign section of that cemetery.

For his services, he was accorded the Order of the Rising Sun (2nd class) in 1895, and the Order of the Sacred Treasures (1st class) in 1896, which came with a 10,000 yen monetary stipend. In 1902, he was awarded the Grand Cordon of the Order of the Rising Sun, and was the first foreigner to receive that decoration, which came with a 15,000 Yen stipend. He was posthumously awarded the Order of the Chrysanthemum.

Future Prime Minister of Japan Hara Takashi, commissioned a bronze bust of Denison, displayed in the entry to the Diplomatic Training Center in the city of Sagamihara, near Yokohama.

== Legacy ==
The Fletcher School of Law and Diplomacy established the chair Henry Willard Denison Professor of History in 1981, with John Curtis Perry being its inaugural holder.
