= Sung-Yoon Lee =

South Korean scholar of North Korea

- 이성윤
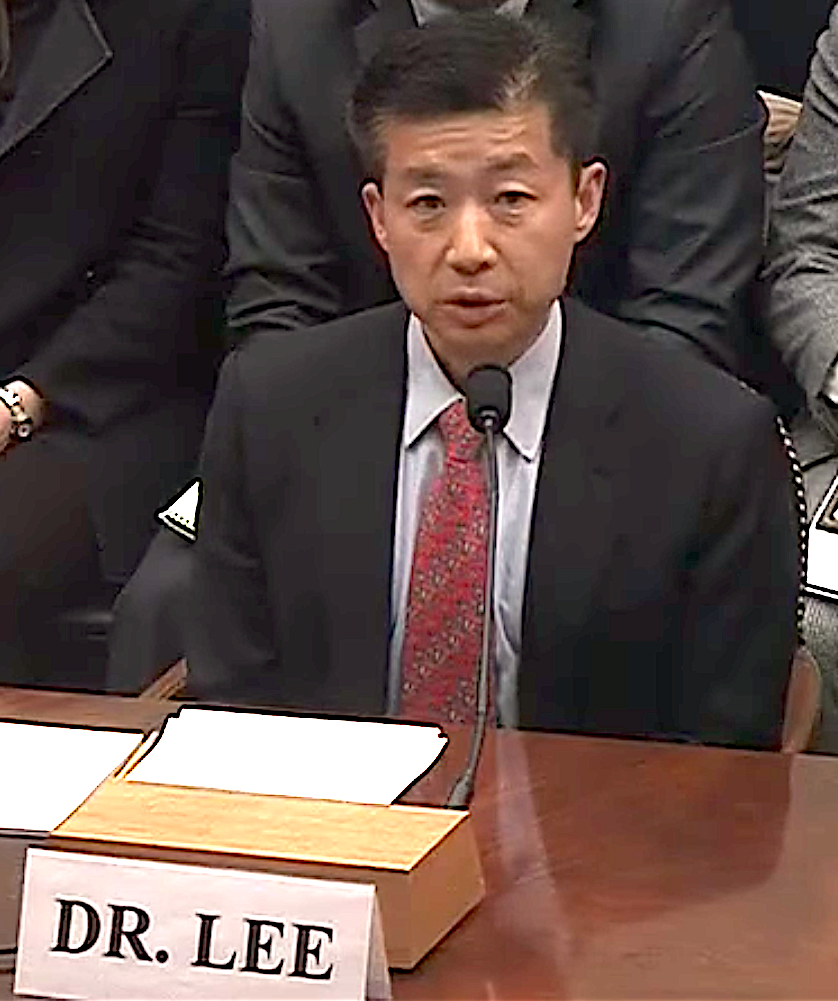
- Born: Seoul, South Korea

Scholarly background
- Education: New College of Florida; Tufts University
- Thesis: The Antinomy of Divine Right and the Right to Resistance
- Doctoral advisor: John Curtis Perry

Scholarly work
- Discipline: Political science
- Institutions: Tufts University; Woodrow Wilson International Center for Scholars; Sejong Institute
- Main interests: Korean studies; East Asian studies; North Korea

Sung-Yoon Lee (Korean: 이성윤; Hanja: 李晟允) is a South Korean political scientist, author, and commentator on Korean studies and East Asian studies, specializing in North Korea, who has been active mainly in the United States.

He is the Principal Fellow in the Center for Korean Peninsula Strategy at the Sejong Institute, a private South Korean foreign policy and security think tank. Previously, he was a fellow at the Woodrow Wilson International Center for Scholars and Kim Koo-Korea Foundation Professor in Korean Studies and assistant professor at the Fletcher School of Law and Diplomacy, Tufts University. He was also an associate in research at the Korea Institute, Harvard University, and a research fellow at the National Asia Research Program.

In June 2023, Lee published his first book, The Sister: North Korea's Kim Yo Jong, the Most Dangerous Woman in the World, profiling Kim Yo-jong, the sibling of, and closest aide to, Kim Jong Un, North Korea's leader.

Lee has provided advice to the US government and is an outspoken proponent of several policies aimed at changing the North Korean regime towards a path of denuclearization and improvement of human rights, while keeping the peace and stability in Northeast Asia. Lee has argued that this can be accomplished with a dual strategy of stern treatment of the North Korean government through unwavering economic sanctions aimed at weakening the leadership and security apparatus, while engaging the country's people through information campaigns that break their isolation from the outside world, humanitarian aid, and a global campaign of human rights.

He has also stated that the US and its military presence in Northeast Asia have brought decades of stability and prosperity to the region, and supports its continued stationing in the Korean peninsula. He also encourages the eventual unification of Korea under the South's direction, with the active support of the US and China, and a resulting united country that is amicable to both powers.

He is a prominent advocate of hard-line, sanctions-centered policies toward North Korea. Lee has been a longstanding critic of engagement-oriented approaches such as the Sunshine Policy. He has also been a persistent critic of South Korea's progressive administrations, arguing that the governments of Kim Dae-jung, Roh Moo-hyun and Moon Jae-in did not deliver substantive improvements in press freedom or restraint in the use of state power, and describing South Korea as having undergone democratic backsliding under Moon.

== Early life and education ==
Lee was born in Seoul, South Korea. In part due to his father being a South Korean diplomat, Lee spent part of his youth in England, Switzerland, and the US.

Lee majored in American and British literature at New College in Sarasota, Florida, graduating in 1991. He pursued his graduate studies at the Fletcher School, completing his Master of Arts in 1994, and his Ph.D. in 1998. John Curtis Perry became his doctoral advisor and developed a lifelong mentor-mentee relationship. In his dissertation "The antinomy of divine right and the right to resistance: tianming, dei gratia, and vox populi in Syngman Rhee's Korea, 1945–1960", Lee analyzed the interplay between Confucianism and democracy in defining political authority and statecraft during the early years of the Republic of Korea.

== Career ==
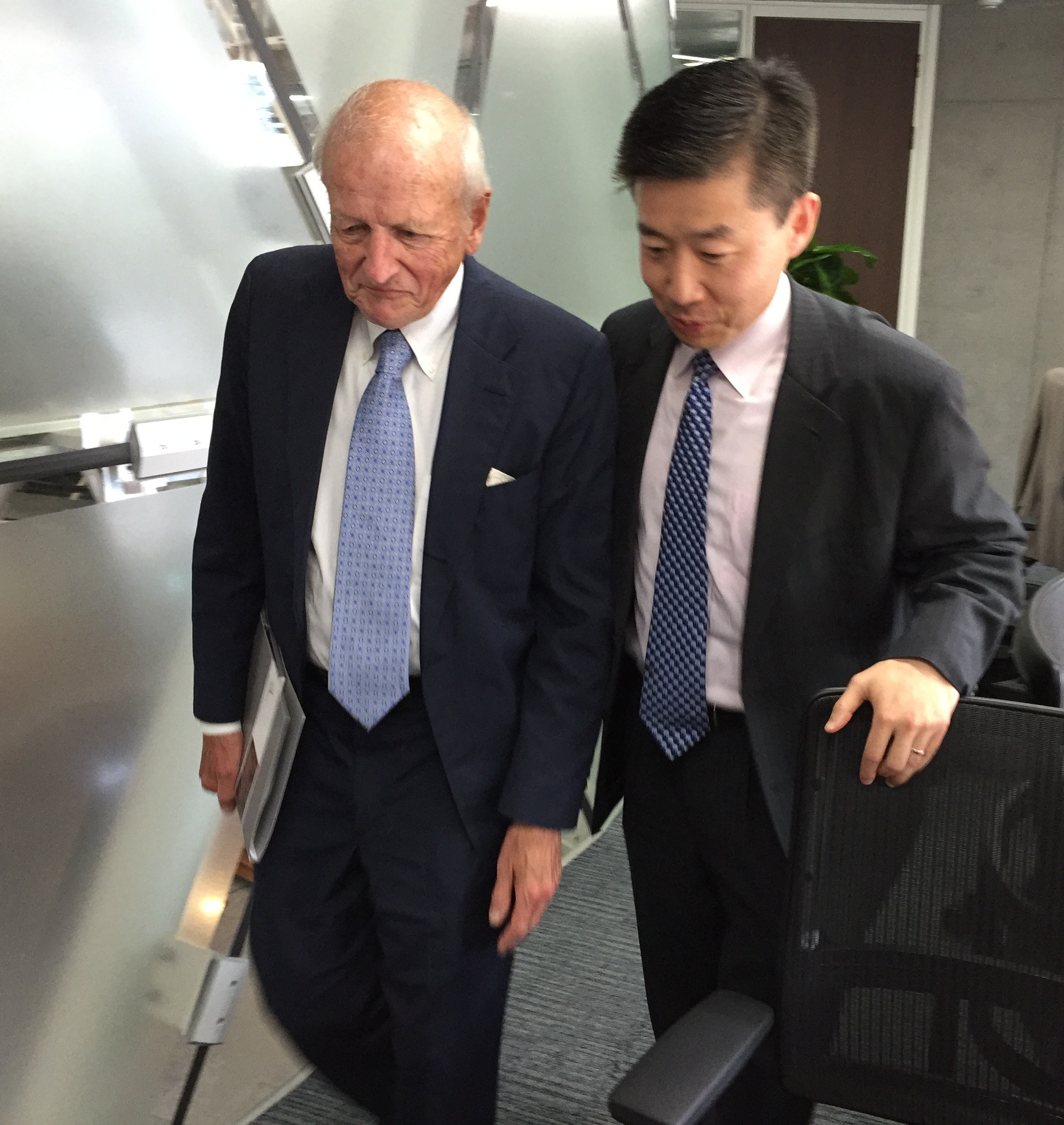
Professors John Curtis Perry and Sung-Yoon Lee; Perry was Lee's doctoral advisor, and subsequently colleague at the Fletcher School, developing a lifelong relationship of friendship and mentorship. In this picture they are seen visiting, as part of an academic delegation, the Asan Institute for Policy Studies in Seoul, Korea, in 2015.

Upon completing his PhD, Lee joined the faculty of The Fletcher School of Law and Diplomacy as the adjunct assistant professor of international politics in 1998 and until 2005. Concurrently he was also the visiting assistant professor of history at Tufts University starting in 2000 and until 2005. Between 2005 and 2006 he was the Kim Koo Research Associate at the Korea Institute, Harvard University. In 2007 he resumed his position at the Fletcher School, and in 2012 became the first holder of the newly created chair Kim Koo-Korea Foundation Assistant Professor of Korean Studies. He held that position until 2023, afterwards becoming a fellow at the Woodrow Wilson International Center for Scholars for one year. In 2025 he joined the Korean think tank Sejong Institute's Center for Korean Peninsula Strategy, as a Principal Fellow.

He has taught International Relations of the United States and East Asia 1945 to Present, United States and East Asia, Politics of the Korean Peninsula: Foreign and Inter-Korean Relations, and North Korean State and Society.

Lee has also been an adjunct assistant professor of Asian studies at Bowdoin College in 2000, and the visiting professor of Korean studies at Sogang University in 2007, and at Seoul National University from 2012 to 2016.

From 1999 until 2013 Lee was an associate in research at the Korea Institute, Harvard University. There he launched a new seminar series, the "Kim Koo Forum on U.S.-Korea Relations", in 2005. He is a former research fellow with the National Asia Research Program, a joint initiative by the National Bureau of Asian Research and the Woodrow Wilson International Center for Scholars. Lee has attended numerous conferences as a speaker, moderator and interpreter. He is also a frequent commentator on Korean affairs on radio, television and print, with The Guardian calling him "among the most insightful and prescient chroniclers" on the behavior of North Korea's regime. Lee has also testified in the United States Congress to provide expert advice on North Korea policy issues.

Since 2013 Lee has been advising the U.S. government on legislation and other executive action against the North Korean regime, including strengthening US sanctions. He has advised both the US President and legislators, including participating in Congressional hearings for the House Foreign Affairs Committee and Senate Foreign Relations Committee.

He has frequently contributed to media outlets, also making there a case for sanctions.

These efforts contributed towards a bill, passed in 2016, of unprecedented tough sanctions primarily aimed at restricting cash flows into the country in an effort to undermine its nuclear warhead and long-range missile development, and constrict Pyongyang's ability to pay (and retain the loyalty of) its party elites, security forces, and military.

In 2018 Lee participated in the Warmbier v. DPRK trial in Washington D.C. as an expert witness for the plaintiffs. The judge ruled against the DPRK, in the torture, hostage taking, and extrajudicial killing of Otto Warmbier.

== Policy views on North Korea ==
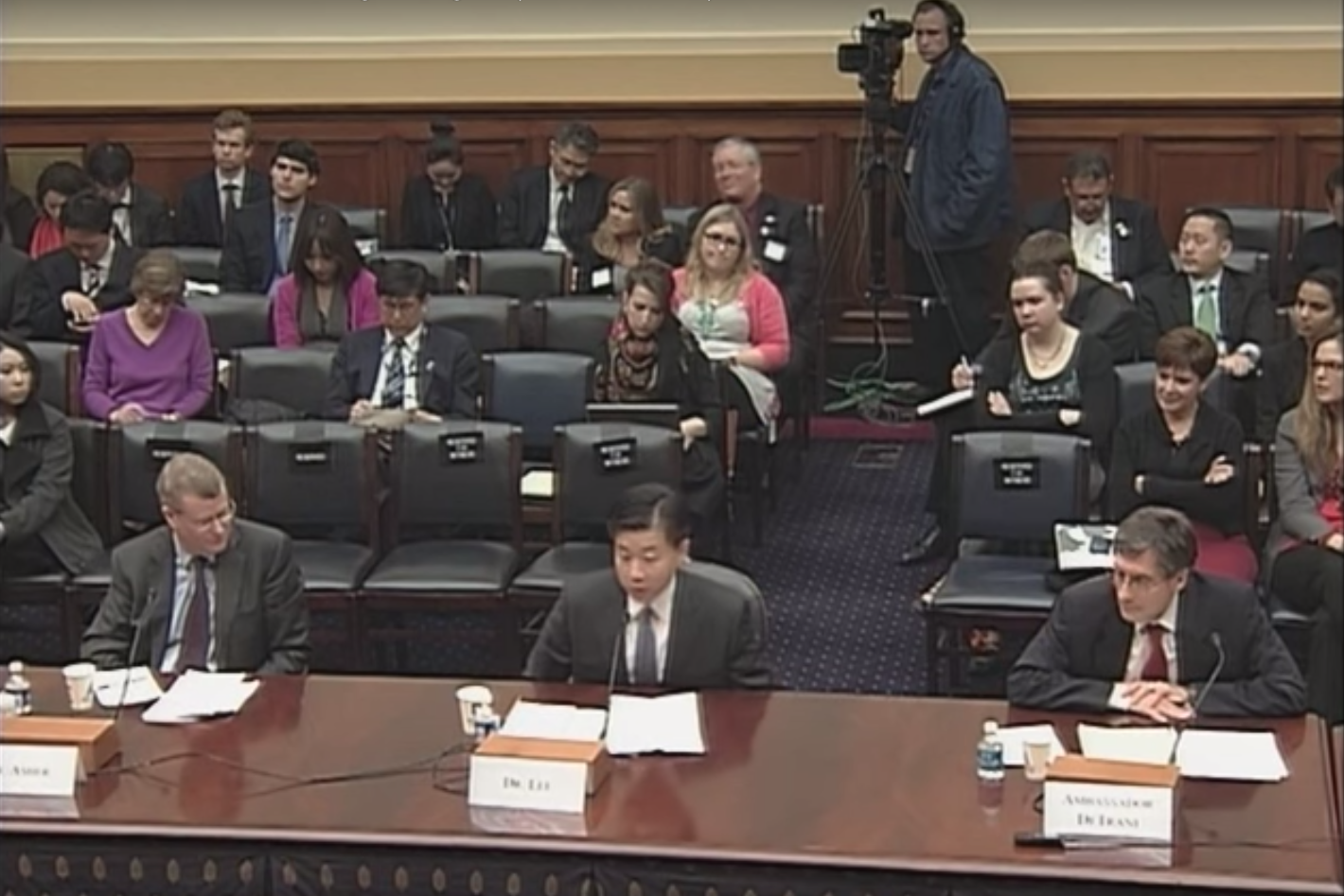
Sung-Yoon Lee in a 2013 US congressional hearing on North Korea's criminal activities

Lee argues that the actions the regime takes both internationally and against its own people “are calculated and predicable, not random and crazy,” and he is known for using the application of historical patterns to understand and predict future conditions in North Korea.

Lee has advocated for a strategy of stern treatment of the North Korean government, while engaging the North Korean people. That includes economic pressure aimed at the elite, especially targeting its palace economy that depends on illicit activities including proliferation, smuggling, counterfeiting, and money laundering. (Note: Daniel Blumenthal (February 12, 2013). "North Korea is a nuclear criminal enterprise". Foreign Policy.) It also means availing substantial humanitarian aid, provided it reaches the intended recipients, increasing efforts to disseminate more information from the outside world into North Korea, facilitating defections, and pressing for a global campaign of human rights.

Lee has underscored that the only non-military way to force North Korea into a real negotiation on denuclearization and human rights is to exert sustained economic and propaganda pressure to "destroy the Kim regime’s instruments of self-preservation": A nuclear program, a loyal ruling class, and a submissive society. That is, by on the one hand pushing more outside information into the North so its society can turn against the regime, and on the other hand by exerting sanctions that limit the cash used to prop the military and ruling apparatus, the regime would weaken to the point of near-collapse, forcing it to negotiate a transition, including a pragmatic way out for the Kim family.

Lee has frequently urged policymakers not to fall for the "self-defeating" trap of short-term concessionary diplomacy; patronizingly thinking that the regime can be persuaded through diplomacy and appeasement. Instead he urges taking the long view of an unwavering strategy of pressure. Lee sustains that refraining from making concessions in exchange for North Korea halting its cyclical belligerence is the most effective way to deter future provocations.

=== Achieving denuclearization and regime change ===
==== Financial and trade sanctions ====
Lee emphatically has asserted that "the only nonmilitary means of forestalling [North Korea's nuclear and missile developments] is for the US to enforce both American and United Nations sanctions against the North Korean regime and its enablers, the foremost of which remains China."

Sanctions should be primarily imposed (as some have) by the U.N. Security Council, and therefore make them binding on the entire international community. However, these "so far did little damage to Pyongyang’s economy thanks to Beijing’s massive material support through the backdoor," further, Beijing has demonstrated "a disingenuous pattern of diplomatic ambidexterity. China has made token gestures like signing on to UN Security Council resolutions while failing to enforce them fully"

Sanctions are the means to reduce external inflows of cash that the regime needs to advance its nuclear and missile development, as well as to keep its ruling class and security apparatus loyal. These sanctions, if made strong and sustained in time, would lead to significantly weakening the regime to the point of near-collapse; by prompting "bankruptcy and the consequent destabilization" and the "specter of revolt or regime collapse", South Korea and the US could negotiate from a position of strength a peaceful transition of the regime that would include real denuclearization and improvement of human rights, as well as a pragmatic "way out for the Kims."

Lee has concluded that a key point of leverage are American-led financial sanctions, since the regime deeply relies on dollars as its foreign currency, and the US is uniquely positioned to use its control over the dollar-based international financial system as well as its economic might, to more effectively impose and enforce sanctions. Overall, Lee recommends:

- Direct sanctions on North Korea's international trade and financial flows.
  - Block any trade of arms, luxury goods, and other goods or services that are a significant source of cash or material support to the regime.
  - Freeze the assets of Kim Jong Un or any of his top deputies, who are believed to have billions of dollars in European and Chinese banks.
- Secondary sanctions: Impose sanctions on North Korea's partners, "thus presenting them with a strong economic disincentive: Either continue to do business with North Korea and be blocked out of the U.S. financial system or stop all business with North Korea and continue to have access to the U.S. financial system,"
  - Publicly identify and sanction all foreign companies, financial institutions, and governments assisting North Korea's nuclear and missile programs.
    - This crucially includes "levying hefty fines on the Chinese banks that, unwittingly or otherwise, launder money for Pyongyang and facilitate dollar transactions on behalf of North Korean entities."

As a reference point on strength and duration of sanctions, Lee remarks that it took several years for a combination of direct and secondary sanctions to bring Iran back to the bargaining table. Moreover, contrary to popular belief, sanctions on North Korea are not "maxed out"; rather, until the sanctions imposed by the US in 2016, American sanctions against North Korea were much weaker than those applied to Iran, Syria, or Burma, Belarus, and Zimbabwe. The 2016 US sanctions brought the enforcement against the North to a "normal" level.

==== Avoiding concessionary diplomacy ====
Lee argues that the North Korean regime has a well-established cycle of escalating tensions, followed by overtures to dialogue and deescalation. The latter bait counterparts that are always eager to resume peace talks, into prematurely softening their sanctions on the North and even sending funds and aid, just to see the North violate any agreements made, and restart the cycle. In this way, the North has extracted profitable concessions at every cycle. Furthermore, the idea of the North negotiating the surrender of their nuclear program is all but an illusion unless the regime comes to a point of near-collapse.

==== Information campaign ====
Lee has written that "applied in greater force and scale, propaganda may be a more powerful deterrent than force. Pyongyang rightfully fears the precedent of Seoul responding asymmetrically with information warfare. (...) Just imagine if Seoul and Washington vastly increased funding for radio broadcast and other information operations into North Korea, as they well should. In an Orwellian world, 'War is peace, freedom is slavery, and ignorance is strength.' In the surreal world of the DPRK, the past 62 years of de facto peace in Korea is war, a life of extreme servitude to the state is freedom, and national strength is preserved by keeping the people ignorant of the outside world." Therefore, "informing and educating the North Korean people is not only the right thing to do" but also a way to "delegitimize Kim's rule in the eyes of his people" and create "great leverage vis-à-vis Pyongyang."

=== United States: Continued commitment to regional stability ===
Lee supports a continued commitment by the US, asserting that the "U.S. has always had in its diplomatic toolbox various useful implements like financial sanctions, measures to prevent illicit activities and weapons proliferation, freeze fuel oil delivery and unconditional aid, and human rights campaigns through the international media in concert with other civilized nations of the world, not to mention UN Resolutions".

Lee has also proposed the US "hold quiet consultations with Beijing to prepare jointly for a unified Korea under Seoul’s direction, a new polity that will be free, peaceful, capitalist, pro-U.S. and pro-China".

Lee opposes the signing of a peace treaty between the US and North Korea (frequently demanded by the latter) absent substantial changes in the regime. He has stated that "North Korea is not seeking peace, but rather a change in the military balance of power on the Korean peninsula", and that "real peace is won by resolve and sacrifice, while ephemeral peace is all too often concocted only by vowels and consonants". Lee maintains that the US military presence in Korea has brought decades of geopolitical stability in the broader region and should remain in the peninsula regardless of the eventual signing of a peace treaty.

=== South Korea: Reconciliation through strength and pragmatism ===
Lee advocates for a stronger lead by South Korea, reinforcing programs for resettlement of refugees, and pressing on in the global campaign for human rights. Lee also supports a South Korean policy of exercising a "resolute mix of stoicism and principled apathy" when faced with North Korea's attempts at provocation and brinksmanship.

Lee was a strong critic of the Sunshine Policy (in force between 1998 and 2008), calling it a failed policy. He stated that the North Korean regime would not be appeased by blandishments, further, such concessions prop the regime and prolong its oppression of the people.

Reconciliation should be sought from a position of strength. South Korea should remain pragmatic, recognizing that "peace in the region has been kept for the last 50 years by the commitment on the part of the United States to the defense of South Korea". Lee also has advocated for increased missile defense capabilities by the South.

Lee has stated that "amnesia or apathy" of the new Korean generations towards their history "can be reversed through sustained education and the public ritual of remembrance", so that "the lessons of the most traumatic past must be learned and continually relearned, not only to prevent such a tragedy from repeating itself, but also to honor, as one nation, those who made our freedom possible, and to remember that freedom is certainly never free".

Lee was an outspoken critic of President Moon Jae-in's engagement policy toward North Korea, arguing in The Hill that the 2018 inter-Korean summits amounted to a pledge of tens of billions of dollars that would ultimately finance Pyongyang's nuclear and missile programs.

In 2025, Lee argued that South Korea should be receptive to Washington's push for an expanded alliance role if it yielded stronger security guarantees, including the possible redeployment of US tactical nuclear weapons to the peninsula.

=== Assessment of North Korea ===
==== Cyclical brinksmanship strategy ====
Most notably in his 2010 "Pyongyang playbook" in Foreign Affairs, Lee argued that contrary to a persistent misconception that North Korea's provocative international behavior is unpredictable, Pyongyang's methods have been highly consistent since the early 1960s; "Its strategy has been to lash out at its enemies when it perceives them to be weak or distracted, up the ante in the face of international condemnation (while blaming external scapegoats) and then negotiate for concessions in return for an illusory promise of peace." He further argued that since North Korea cannot economically compete with South Korea, the North's regime relies "only on military and political brinkmanship to make up ground"

==== Regime and human rights ====
Lee characterizes the North Korean regime as "uniquely unique", for being the world's sole communist hereditary dynasty; the only literate, industrialized and urbanized peacetime economy to have suffered a famine; the most cultish totalitarian system; the most secretive, isolated country; and the largest military in terms of manpower and defense spending proportional to its population and national income. Lee has also called the regime a criminal enterprise, for activities including money laundering, human enslavement by having the world's largest prison and slave labor camps, and for nuclear extortion. Lee further asserts that North Korea is the most systematic violator of human rights, having committed nine out of the ten crimes against humanity as specified in article 7 of the Rome Statute of the International Criminal Court.

==== Leadership and succession ====
Lee profiled Kim Yo Jong, the sister, closest deputy, and potential successor to North Korea's leader Kim Jong Un. He concluded that she is the second most powerful person in North Korea, after her brother. Lee also asserted that she is one of the most powerful and dangerous leaders in the contemporary world. Lee argued that this is because she is the second in command of a regime that has nuclear weapons, is bellicose towards other countries, represses its own people, and has no checks and balances on its leadership.

Lee postulates she is best positioned among the Kim family members to succeed her brother, especially if he were incapacitated before his own children had grown up. Were she to become the supreme leader, her personality and track record suggest that she would not be a reformist and would rule her country with an iron fist much like her predecessors. Also in her current governmental positions including foreign policy, Lee warns against mistaking her femininity for weakness or amenability, and describes her as cold and ruthless.

==== Nuclear pursuit and denuclearization talks ====
Talking about the logic for the regime's nuclear pursuit, he remarked that "a nuclear North Korea is unlike a nuclear China or Russia. During the Cold War, neither Beijing nor Moscow faced an existential threat in the form of an alternate Chinese or Russian state. Pyongyang, on the other hand, has had to live with a far more prosperous and legitimate Korean state across its southern border." A nuclear capability by the North would undermine the US commitment to defending the South, and "a nonnegotiable means of isolating and exercising dominance over Seoul" and as the key to ensure the long-term survival of the Kim regime.

Therefore, Lee has repeatedly called negotiations on denuclearization "nuclear blackmail" by the North and believes that "short of change in the Pyongyang regime, further fits of nuclear negotiations are all but an exercise in futility", in which the Kim regime treating negotiations (including the six-party talks) as "a perpetual multilateral forum for receiving economic and political aid".

==== Post-collapse planning ====
Lee anticipates that in case of collapse, "a power vacuum in Pyongyang will require the immediate dispatch of South Korean and US troops. Next will come other regional powers -- Chinese peacekeeping forces securing the northern areas, followed by the Japanese Maritime Self-Defense Force transporting people and supplies along the Korean coastlines. In the short term, a multiparty international presence north of the 38th parallel under the nominal banner of the United Nations will enforce order and provide aid."

Lee also supports a US-South Korea joint "emergency response measures such as securing the North's stockpiles of weapons of mass destruction, maintaining public safety, controlling borders, and providing humanitarian aid to displaced North Koreans", as well as long-term development similar to post-WWII reconstruction of Japan.

== Views on South Korean domestic politics ==
Lee commented frequently on the corruption scandal that led to Park Geun-hye's removal from office. On the day the Constitutional Court upheld her impeachment in March 2017, he told The Washington Post that the case was "a major landmark in the young political history of the South Korean state", saying that it spoke to collusion between government and big business and amounted to a victory for the rule of law. He told CNBC that the indictment of Samsung vice chairman Lee Jae-yong was "a blow to the chaebol and shady government-business collusion", while questioning whether the proceedings would narrow the gap between elites and the public in South Korea's hierarchical society.

In December 2018, Lee gave the closing address at an American Enterprise Institute conference in Washington, "The Open Society and Its Enemies in South Korea: From Right Authoritarianism — to Left?", which examined freedom of speech under the Moon administration, and afterwards joined a conversation with Nicholas Eberstadt. He argued that the view that South Korea's progressive administrations — those of Kim Dae-jung, Roh Moo-hyun and Moon Jae-in — had produced substantive improvements in press freedom, censorship and abuse of power was "unfounded", citing Freedom House and Reporters Without Borders indices, and said that a comparable "holier-than-thou" imperiousness had been present in every South Korean administration. He further contended that earlier right-wing authoritarian governments, whatever their own abuses, had not underwritten North Korea's weapons programs, citing Kim Dae-jung's transfer of $500 million to Kim Jong Il shortly before the 2000 inter-Korean summit and aid provided under Roh, whose posture at the 2007 summit he described as "that of a supplicant". He also criticized the Moon administration's "three nos" policy — no further THAAD deployments, no participation in a US-led missile defense network and no trilateral alliance with the United States and Japan — arguing that earlier conservative governments had not aligned with China on fundamental questions of national security.

In the same address, Lee characterized the 2016–17 candlelight protests as "democracy in action" rather than a revolution, stated that Park Geun-hye had been impeached and removed "through constitutional process" and was "justifiably removed from office", and described her 33-year sentence as excessive. Asked at the same event whether South Korea could be characterized as authoritarian, he replied that no panelist had said so, distinguishing "authoritarian tendencies, not authoritarian".

In February 2022, ahead of the South Korean election, Lee was listed as a panelist at the Conservative Political Action Conference (CPAC) in Orlando, Florida, on a breakout session titled "Is South Korea the Next Venezuela?", alongside Bill Hagerty, Gordon Chang, Grant Newsham and Morse Tan.

Commenting on Yoon Suk-yeol's victory in the 2022 South Korean presidential election, Lee described him as "a maverick" and said South Korean public opinion had swung sharply away from China, while judging that Beijing's economic leverage meant Yoon could not afford to be aggressively anti-China. He told Stars and Stripes that US diplomats had welcomed the outcome, assessing that Yoon's foreign policy platform "coincides far better with America's interests" than that of his opponent Lee Jae-myung, and that Yoon's stated intention to repair relations with Japan mattered because conservatives had traditionally valued Japan's place in the US-led alliance structure.

Writing in The Hill days after the election, Lee argued that Yoon's first task was to reverse democratic backsliding under Moon, whom he accused of having "waged an impressive war on the universal freedoms of speech and information". He cited defamation actions brought against private citizens who had mocked or insulted the president, a law criminalizing the sending of leaflets and goods into North Korea, and cuts in funding and what he described as pretextual audits directed at organizations researching North Korean human rights abuses. He characterized the Moon administration's campaign to eradicate "deeply-rooted evils" as political revenge against opponents, and attributed Yoon's narrow victory more to public appetite for change than to the president-elect's own political skill.

Speaking to The World in Seoul in January 2025, during the crisis that followed President Yoon Suk-yeol's declaration of martial law, Lee said the declaration had been "completely uncalled for" and a betrayal of the nation's trust, and that Yoon deserved to be impeached, with his fate resting on the Constitutional Court. At the same time, he described the push to arrest Yoon as something of an overreach, observing that Yoon had already been impeached and suspended, was subject to a travel ban and was not a flight risk, and said voters were growing skeptical of the opposition after it had impeached a record number of officials.

== List of works ==
=== Selected works ===
- Lee, Sung-Yoon (2023). The Sister: The extraordinary story of Kim Yo Jong, the most powerful woman in North Korea. Macmillan / PublicAffairs (Hachette). ISBN 9781529073539.
- Lee, Sung-Yoon (August 26, 2010). "The Pyongyang Playbook". Foreign Affairs.
- Lee, Sung-Yoon; Stanton, Joshua (2015). "North Korea's Next Dare – What Is Coming—and What to Do About It". Foreign Affairs.
- Lee, Sung-Yoon (January 18, 2017). "How Trump Can Get Tough on North Korea - Making Kim Pay for Belligerence". Foreign Affairs.
- Lee, Sung-Yoon; Stanton, Joshua; Klingner, Bruce (2017). "Getting Tough on North Korea: How to Hit Pyongyang Where It Hurts". Foreign Affairs. 96 (65).

== Notes ==
Sung-Yoon Lee's policy views on North Korea are sourced from the following works
