= Sejong Institute =

South Korean organization for public interest and think tank

The Sejong Institute
- Formation: 1983
- Type: Foreign & Security Policy Think Tank
- Location: Seongnam, South Korea
- President: Haksoon Paik (백학순)
- Website: www.Sejong.org

- Sejong Institute
- Hangul: 세종연구소
- Hanja: 世宗硏究所
- RR: Sejong yeonguso
- MR: Sejong yŏn'guso

Sejong Institute (Korean: 세종연구소; Hanja: 世宗硏究所) is a non-profit, independent organization for public interest and a think tank in South Korea, dedicated to developing strategies and policies in areas of foreign and security affairs and Korean unification, regional issues, and international political economy. The Sejong Institute was established as a foundation for policy studies and research with the support of national leaders in politics and business, in the aftermath of the Rangoon Incident in October 1983. The institute's current president, Haksoon Paik (백학순), Ph.D. in Political Science at the University of Pennsylvania, is a Korean expert in North Korean politics, inter-Korean relations, North Korea-U.S. relations, and North Korean nuclear and missile issues. The Sejong Institute works in collaboration with international specialists and institutions holding various academic conferences and forums around the world. It provides policy ideas and strategies for peace and prosperity for Korea and the world, and plays a role to strengthen Korea's public diplomacy.

== Research ==
The Sejong Institute operates three research departments – Department of Diplomatic Strategy Studies, Department of Security Strategy Studies, and Department of Unification Strategy Studies.

== Education ==
The Sejong Institute carries out an annual training program called the Sejong National Strategy Education Program. It lasts around 10 months and receives leaders from government agencies, government invested organizations and private sector. The trainees attend lectures from invited lecturers as well as research fellows of the Sejong Institute. Also, the institute has begun to offer the program Academy for Young Leaders for undergraduate and graduate students to cultivate young leaders of the next generation in the areas of diplomacy, security, and national unification.

== Publications ==
The books and journals they publish include joint and individual Mid-to-Long-Term Policy Research, Comprehensive Research, Granted Research Projects, quarterly National Strategy, and a web-based email service in the form of Sejong Commentary, Current Issues & Policies, and Sejong Policy Brief. The Sejong as an institution produces an Annual Report as well, which details an updated introduction of the institute and summarizes the annual research outcomes.

== Support programs for bereaved families ==
The Sejong Foundation is providing financial support and scholarship to the bereaved families of the 1983 Rangoon bombing victims — 17 senior diplomatic officials and other members of the presidential entourage – killed by North Korean terrorists.

== History ==
The history of the Sejong Institute is presented in the following timeline:

November 25, 1983	Inaugural meeting was held and bylaw was adopted.
December 1, 1983	The Ilhae Corporate Foundation was established (The Ministry of Education). Soon-Dal Choi Lim inaugurated as the 1st Chairman of the Ilhae Foundation.
July 2, 1984	The Ilhae Foundation opened its office.
October 26, 1984	The subordination was shifted from the Ministry of Education to the Ministry of Foreign Affairs.
February 1, 1985	The Ilhae Foundation started granting scholarships and secured the construction site.
January 18, 1986	The Peace and Security Research Institute was established under the Ilhae Foundation.
August 27, 1987	The Ilhae Foundation was renamed as the Ilhae Institute of the Ilhae Foundation.
March 20, 1988	The Ilhae Institute started to disburse financial support to the bereaved families of the Rangoon victims.
May 4, 1988	The Ilhae Institute was renamed to the Sejong Institute
March 6, 1995	The Sejong training program was established and the first Term Training Course was provided
September 19, 1996	The Sejong Institute was restructured and renamed as the Sejong Foundation, and the institute became an affiliate of this foundation.
June 1, 2015	The Sejong Institute of the Sejong Foundation was restructured and renamed as the Sejong Institute.
February 12, 2018	Jong Chun Baek inaugurated as the chairman of the Sejong Institute.
June 1, 2018	Haksoon Paik inaugurated as the president of the Sejong Institute.
