= Journal of Asian and African Studies =

Academic journal covering Asian and African studies

- Discipline: Asian studies, African studies
- Language: English
- Edited by: Nigel C. Gibson

Publication details
- History: 1966-present
- Publisher: SAGE Publications
- Frequency: Bimonthly
- Impact factor: 1.0 (2022)

Standard abbreviations
- ISO 4: J. Asian Afr. Stud.

Indexing
- ISSN: 0021-9096 (print); 1745-2538 (web)
- LCCN: 75001539
- OCLC no.: 300298288

Links
- Journal homepage; Online access; Online archive

The Journal of Asian and African Studies is a bimonthly peer-reviewed academic journal that covers research in the fields of Asian and African studies. The journal's editor-in-chief is Nigel C. Gibson (Emerson College). It was established in 1966 and is currently published by SAGE Publications.

== Abstracting and indexing ==
The journal is abstracted and indexed in:

- ATLA Religion Database
- GEOBASE
- Modern Language Association Database
- Scopus
- Worldwide Political Science Abstracts

According to the Journal Citation Reports, the journal has a 2021 impact factor of 1.0.
