= China Institute =

American nonprofit organization

- China Institute of America
- Established: 1926; 100 years ago
- Type: 501(c)(3) organization
- Tax ID no.: 13-1623937
- Purpose: Education, Arts, Cultural Programs
- Headquarters: 100 Washington Street, New York, NY 10006
- Website: www.chinainstitute.org

China Institute of America is a nonprofit educational and cultural institution based in New York City. Its work is focused on promoting Chinese culture and history through talks, business initiatives, language immersion programs, and gallery exhibitions. It hosts a Confucius Institute in partnership with the East China Normal University.

== History ==
China Institute was founded in 1926 by a group of American and Chinese educators—including educational philosopher John Dewey of Columbia University and Chinese educator Hu Shih (later president of Peking University and China's ambassador to the U.S.)

China Institute is believed to be the oldest educational organization devoted solely to Chinese culture, and has drawn one million visitors in its nearly hundred years of existence. Following the 1949 establishment of the People's Republic of China, the organization lost many of its ties to mainland China. In 2015, China Institute announced plans to move from the Upper East Side to Lower Manhattan the following year. The new space at 100 Washington Street opened in November 2016, coinciding with the gallery's fiftieth anniversary.
