= The Fletcher Forum of World Affairs =

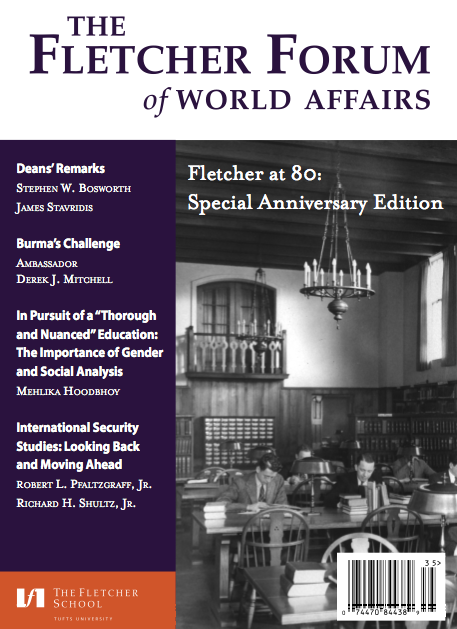
- Discipline: International relations
- Language: English

Publication details
- Former name: The Fletcher Forum
- History: 1975–present
- Publisher: The Fletcher School of Law and Diplomacy (United States)
- Frequency: Biannually
- Open access: Yes

Standard abbreviations
- ISO 4: Fletcher Forum World Aff.

Indexing
- ISSN: 1046-1868
- LCCN: sn89025609
- OCLC no.: 51864059
- The Fletcher Forum
- ISSN: 0147-0981

Links
- Journal homepage; Fletcher Forum's Online archives; Tufts Digital Library archives (1976-2010; open access)

The Fletcher Forum of World Affairs is a biannual peer-reviewed academic journal of international relations established in 1975. It is managed by students at The Fletcher School of Law and Diplomacy (Tufts University). It is also an online foreign policy forum with additional articles and interviews.

== Scope ==
The journal provides interdisciplinary analysis with articles covering an array of international relations fields that include humanitarian studies, security studies, development studies, international law, international business, regional Studies, international politics, environmental studies, and diplomacy. Works in the journal have been cited in other specialized scholarly journals, books, and in policy-making, as well as having been republished in other outlets.

The Fletcher Forum includes feature articles, book reviews, interviews and editorials. While the current issue is available for purchase, most articles from previous issues are individually available for download through the journal's website, or through Tufts Digital Library archives.

== Abstracting and indexing ==
The journal is abstracted and indexed in HeinOnline, LexisNexis, ProQuest, Westlaw, CCLP Contents of Current Legal Periodicals, and International Political Science Abstracts.

== History ==
The cover of the first issue of The Fletcher Forum, Fall 1976.

The cover of the 13th volume, in 1989, using for the first time the journal's new name.

The journal was established in the fall of 1976 as The Fletcher Forum: A Journal of Graduate Studies in International Affairs. The director was Jeffrey A. Sheehan and the editorial board was chaired by Shashi Tharoor. The journal obtained its current name in 1989.

In 2006, on the occasion of the 30th anniversary of the journal, Tharoor explained in a retrospective article in The Forum how the journal was created principally "as an outlet for student research and writing", but that over time it had become an "established journal" in its field, "attracting contributors of great distinction and attaining (and maintaining) the exacting standards the world has come to expect from The Fletcher School of Law and Diplomacy." The issue also highlighted some of the notable contributors, including Kofi Annan, John Bolton, Javier Pérez de Cuéllar, Paul H. Nitze. Other notable contributors and interviewees have included Al Gore, Madeleine Albright, James Baker, William J. Perry, Joseph Dunford, James G. Stavridis, Dominique de Villepin and Juan Manuel Santos.

In another article in the journal, Ambassador Stephen Bosworth during his tenure as the Dean of the Fletcher School, called it "a major publication of international affairs", which provides an outlet for "thoughtful leaders in international affairs to share their insight on our changing world.", "as the world's political focus moves away from superpower domination and continues to struggle with issues of economic growth, human rights, and climate change."

=== Supplemental issues ===
The journal has published some special issues, as third issues within the corresponding academic year's volume:

- Papers and presentations from a special conference held at the Fletcher School on September 30, 2004 (2005, vol. 29)
- A collection of speeches and papers presented at the conference "Non-proliferation of Weapons of Mass Destruction: Current Challenges and New Approaches", cosponsored by the Fletcher School and the American Academy of Diplomacy, held on October 21, 2005 (2006, vol 30)
- Commemorative issue for the 100th birthday of Edward R. Murrow (2008, vol. 32)
- Celebration of The Fletcher School's 80th anniversary (2013, vol. 37),

=== Editors-in-chief ===
The volumes and their editorial board composition typically follows the academic year cycle, beginning in the fall of a year, and finishing in the summer of the following one. The following persons have been editor-in-chief:

- 1976-77 (Vol. 1): Shashi Tharoor
- 1977-78 (Vol. 2): K. Alexander Hobson
- 1978-79 (Vol. 3): K. Alexander Hobson (issue 1), Randall Roeser (issue 2)
- 1979-80 (Vol. 4): Miles A. Libbey III
- 1980-81 (Vol. 5): Robert E. Kiernan
- 1981-82 (Vol. 6): Edward W. Desmong
- 1982-83 (Vol. 7): Jeffrey D. Feltman
- 1983-84 (Vol. 8): Patricia A. Smith
- 1984-85 (Vol. 9): David M. Cooper
- 1985-86 (Vol. 10): Augusta Pipkin
- 1986-87 (Vol. 11): Sam B. Rovit
- 1987-88 (Vol. 12): David Kupferschmid
- 1988-89 (Vol. 13): Robert E. Ford
- 1989-90 (Vol. 14): Carol Hills
- 1990-91 (Vol. 15): Margaret Smith
- 1991-92 (Vol. 16): Sheila Machado
- 1992-93 (Vol. 17): Mark Terry (issue 1), Tammy Halevy, Bruce Keith
- 1993-94 (Vol. 18): Linda Head Flanagan
- 1994-95 (Vol. 19): Linda J. Maguire
- 1995-96 (Vol. 20): Jennifer Evans
- 1996-97 (Vol. 21): Sara Mason
- 1997-98 (Vol. 22): Kate Mahoney
- 1998-99 (Vol. 23): Carlisle J. Levine
- 1999-2000 (Vol. 24): Brian T. Jackson
- 2000-01 (Vol. 25): Vashti Van Wyke
- 2001-02 (Vol. 26) Daniel Langenkamp
- 2002-03 (Vol. 27): Mariya Rasner
- 2003-04 (Vol. 28): Emma Belcher
- 2004-05 (Vol. 29): Annelena Lobb
- 2005-06 (Vol. 30): Cornelia Schneider
- 2006-07 (Vol. 31): Jonathan L. K. Reiber
- 2007-08 (Vol. 32): Catherine G. Pfaffenroth
- 2008-09 (Vol. 33): Justin Ginnetti
- 2009-10 (Vol. 34): Naureen Kabir
- 2010-11 (Vol. 35): David Reidy
- 2011-12 (Vol. 36): Paul Nadeau
- 2012-13 (Vol. 37): Alexander Ely
- 2013-14 (Vol. 38): Julia Radice
- 2014-15 (Vol. 39): Christopher Maroshegyi
- 2015-16 (Vol. 40): Natalie Lam
- 2016-17 (Vol. 41): Emily Morgenstern
- 2017-18 (Vol. 42): Maria Selde
- 2018-19 (Vol. 43): Elissa F. Miller
- 2019-20 (Vol. 44): Lukas P. Bundonis
- 2020-21 (Vol. 45): Alessandra Testa
- 2021-22 (Vol. 46): Delia C. Burns
- 2023-24 (Vol 48): Aarushi Aggarwal
- 2024-25 (Vol 49): Sophie Lehrenbaum
- 2025-26 (Vol 50): Armaan Mathur
