= Naval Research Advisory Committee =

Civilian advisory committee

- Abbreviation: NRAC
- Formation: 1946
- Dissolved: April 1, 2019; 7 years ago
- Type: Governmental organization
- Members: Maximum of 15
- Secretary General: United States Under Secretary of the Navy
- Parent organization: United States Navy
- Website: www.nrac.navy.mil/default.asp (dead)

The Naval Research Advisory Committee (NRAC) was a civilian advisory committee to the United States Navy from 1946 to 2019. Its stated mission was "To know the problems of the Navy and Marine Corps, keep abreast of the current research and development programs, and provide an independent, objective assessment capability through investigative studies".

One source stated that the NRAC was named after its predecessor and alternately called the National Research Defense Committee of the Office of Scientific Research and Development.

== History ==
The committee was established in 1946 by Public Law 588, which also created the Office of Naval Research. Members were appointed by the Secretary of the Navy to a two-year term, with membership limited by law to 15 members preeminent in the fields of science, research, and development, with one member required to specialize in medicine. At first the committee focused on advising the Chief of Naval Research, but in 1956 it took on a broader role at the request of Admiral Arleigh Burke, then Chief of Naval Operations.

The committee normally met quarterly and when called by the Committee Chairperson; through its panels it provided advice on a variety of topics in science, research, and development. Study topics included Disruptive Commercial Technologies (2008), Distributed Operations (2007), Lightening the Load (reducing the weight carried by individual combat Marines (2007) and Future Fuels (2006). In 2009, membership included retired Navy and Coast Guard Admirals, retired US Marine Corps Generals, past Defense Advanced Research Projects Agency (DARPA) Program Managers including former DARPA Director and current NRAC Chairman Frank Fernandez and an interactive application/film producer (James Korris).

NRAC was terminated by acting Secretary of Defense Patrick M. Shanahan on April 1, 2019. Acting Navy Secretary Thomas Modly had ordered the Deputy Under Secretary Of The Navy to do this in a memo dated 21 February 2019.

== See also ==
- Commercial Hunter
- United States Marine Corps Warfighting Laboratory
