= Richard H. Shultz =

American scholar (1947–2025)

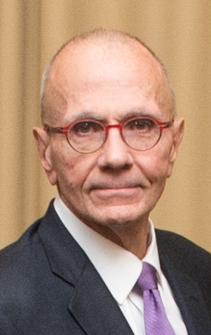
- Shultz in 2017
- Born: October 25, 1947
- Died: November 22, 2025 (aged 78)
- Awards: Department of the Army Outstanding Civilian Service Award

Academic background
- Education: Miami University (Ph.D.); University of Michigan (Post-doctoral studies)

Academic work
- Discipline: Security studies, insurgency, terrorism, intelligence gathering, internal conflicts, low intensity conflict
- Institutions: The Fletcher School of Law and Diplomacy, Tufts University

Richard H. Shultz Jr. (October 25, 1947 – November 22, 2025) was an American scholar of international security studies. He was Shelby Cullom Davis Professor of International Security Studies at The Fletcher School of Law and Diplomacy, Tufts University, where he was also the director of the International Security Studies Program (ISSP).

== Early life and education ==
Shultz was born on October 25, 1947. According to his published CV, Shultz pursued his PhD studies at Miami University, graduating in 1976. His dissertation was titled Origins and Development of U.S. Counterinsurgency Strategy: The Vietnam Case Study, chaired by David S. McLellan. He then pursued post-doctoral studies at the University of Michigan, from 1977 to 1978.

== Career ==
Shultz entered the Fletcher School and ISSP in 1983, as the associate professor of international politics. He became the director of ISSP in 1989.

He was an expert and early scholar of insurgency, with his early works including influential research on guerrilla warfare in Vietnam. He was also an expert on terrorism, intelligence gathering, internal conflicts, and low intensity conflict.

Shultz served on the Special Operations Policy Advisory Group of the U.S. Department of Defense, where he was the only civilian in that position. He also did security research and served as advisor for several U.S. civil and military organizations, and held chairs at the U.S. Military Academy, U.S. Naval War College, and the U.S. Department of Defense. He has testified in the U.S. congress.

Shultz was a member of several boards of trustees, including the Board to the Carnegie Council for Ethics in International Affairs. His consultant work for the government has focused on U.S. peacekeeping policy, out-of-area interventions, counter-proliferation issues, and the growing impact of international organized crime on U.S. security interests.

== Death ==
Shultz died on November 22, 2025, at the age of 78.

== Publications ==
=== Books authored ===
- The Marines Take Anbar: The Four-Year Fight to Defeat al Qaeda in Iraq (Naval Institute Press, 2013) ISBN 9781612511405
- Insurgents, Terrorists, and Militias: The Warriors of Contemporary Combat, co-authored with Andrea Dew (Columbia University Press, 2006) ISBN 978-0231129824
- The Secret War Against Hanoi: Kennedy and Johnson's Use of Spies, Saboteurs, and Covert Warriors in North Vietnam (New York: Harper Collins, 1999) ISBN 978-0060932534
- The Soviet Union and Revolutionary Warfare (Stanford, CA: The Hoover Institution Press, Stanford University, 1990) ISBN 978-0817987121
- Dezinformatsia: Active Measures in Soviet Strategy, co-authored with Roy Godson (New York: Brassey’s, 1984) ISBN 978-0080315737

=== Books edited ===
- Security Studies for the Twenty-First Century, co-editor and author with Roy Godson and George Quester (Washington, DC: Brassey’s, 1997).
- The Role of Naval in 21st Century Operations, co-editor and author with Robert L. Pfaltzgraff, Jr (Washington, DC: Brassey’s International Defense Publishers, 2000).
- Security Studies for the 1990s, co-editor and author with Roy Godson and Ted Greenwood (New York: Brassey’s, 1993)
- Ethnic Conflict and Regional Instability: Implications for US Policy and Army Roles and Missions, co-editor and author with Robert L. Pfaltzgraff, Jr. (Carlisle, PA: Strategic Studies Institute, U.S. Army War College, 1994)
- Naval Forward Presence Missions and the National Military Strategy, co-editor and author with Robert L. Pfaltzgraff, Jr. (Annapolis, MD: Naval Institute Press, 1993)
- The Future of Air Power in the Aftermath of the Gulf War, co-editor and author with Robert L. Pfaltzgraff, Jr. (Montgomery, AL: Air University Press, 1992)
- U.S. Defense Policy in an Era of Constrained Resources, co-editor and author with Robert L. Pfaltzgraff, Jr. (Lexington, MA: Lexington Books, 1989)
- Guerrilla Warfare and Counterinsurgency: U.S.-Soviet Policy in the Third World, co-editor with Robert L. Pfaltzgraff, Jr., Uri Ra'anan, and William Olson (Lexington, MA: Lexington Books, 1988)
- Hydra of Carnage: The International Linkages of Terrorism, co-editor and author with Uri Ra’anan, Robert L. Pfaltzgraff, Jr., Ernst Halperin, and Igor Lukes (Lexington, MA: Lexington Books, 1985)
- Special Operations in US Strategy, co-editor with Frank R. Barnett and B. Hugh Tovar (Washington, DC: National Defense University Press, 1985)
- Power, Principles and Interests: A Reader in World Politics, co-editor and author with James P. O’Leary and Jeffrey Salmon (Lexington, MA: Ginn Press, 1985)
- Lessons from an Unconventional War: Reassessing U.S. Strategies in Preparing for Future Conflicts, co-editor and author with Richard Hunt (New York: Pergamon, 1982)
- Responding to the Terrorist Threat: Security and Crisis Management, co-editor with Stephen Sloan (New York: Pergamon, 1980)

=== Monographs ===
- Organizational Learning and the Marine Corps (Newport, RI: U.S. Naval War College, Center on Irregular Warfare and Armed Groups, 2013)
- Adapting America's Security Paradigm and Security Agenda, Special Report, co-authored with Roy Godson, Querine Hanlon, and Samantha Ravich (Washington, DC: National Strategy Information Center, 2010)
- Strategic Culture and Strategic Studies: An Alternative Framework for Assessing Al Qaeda and the Global Jihadi Movement (Tampa, FL: USSOCOM/Joint Special Operations University Press, 2012)
- Armed Groups and Irregular Warfare: Adapting Professional Military Education, co-authored with Roy Godson and Querine Hanlon (Washington, DC: National Strategy Information Center, 2009)
- Global Insurgency Strategy and the Salafi Jihad Movement (Boulder, CO: Institute for National Security Studies, 2008).
- Armed Groups: A Tier-One Security Priority, co-authored with Itamara V. Lochard and Doug Farah (Boulder, CO: Institute for National Security Studies, 2004).
- Ethnic and Religious Conflict: Emerging Threat to US Security, co-authored with William Olson (Washington, DC: National Strategy Information Center, 1994)
- In the Aftermath of War: US Support for Reconstruction and Nation-Building in Panama Following Just Cause (Montgomery, AL: Air Force University Press, 1993)
