= Urban camouflage =

Camouflage designed for urban environments

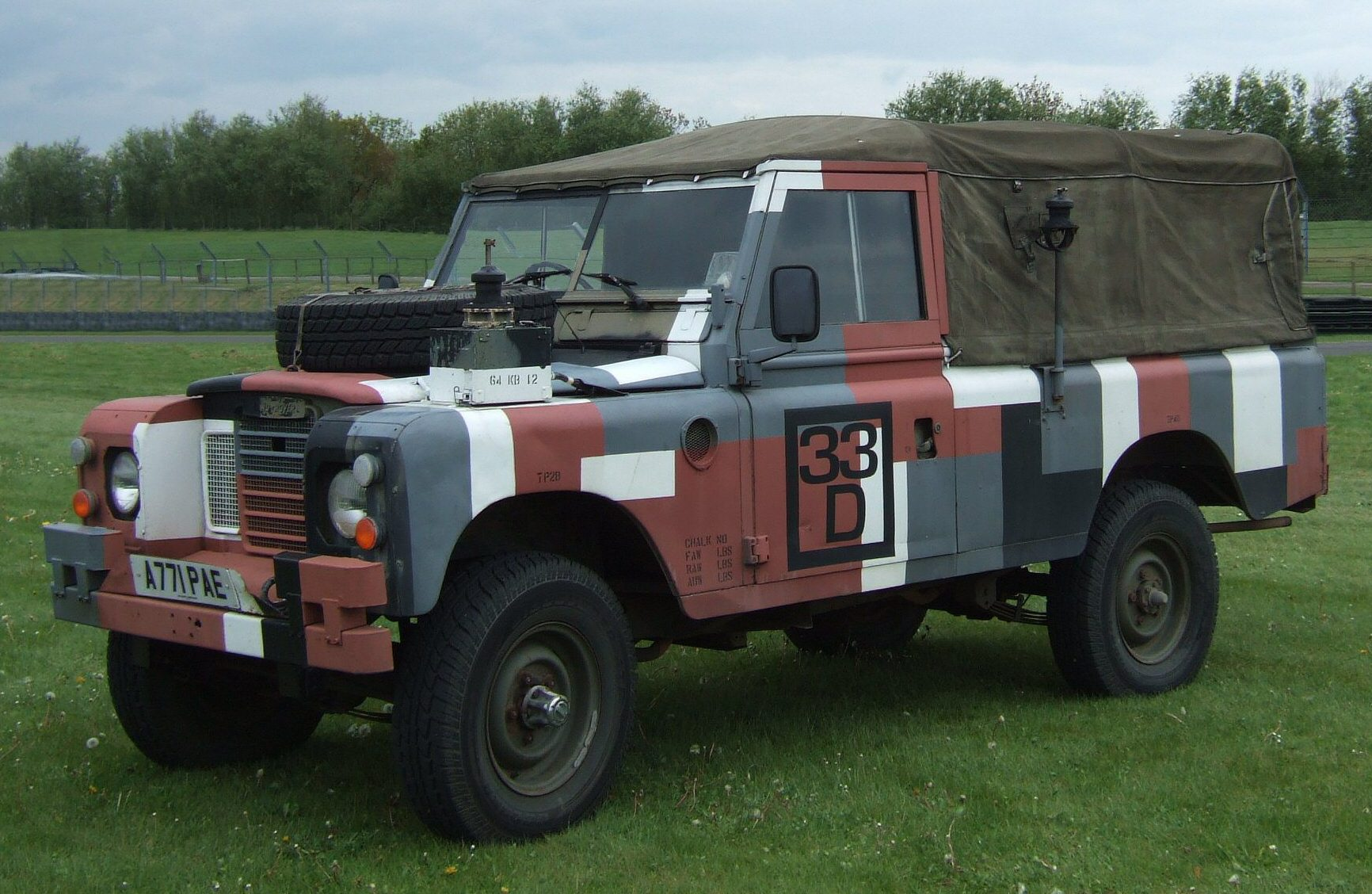
British Army Land-Rover in Berlin camouflage, developed during the Cold War

Urban camouflage is the use of camouflage patterns chosen to make soldiers and equipment harder to see in built-up areas, places such as cities and industrial parks, during urban warfare.

Several armed forces have developed urban camouflage patterns. Some are in use with paramilitary forces.

== History ==
Urban camouflage has rarely been used by armed forces in built-up environments and is mostly used in limited trials. During the Cold War, the British Army used vehicles painted in the "Berlin camouflage" urban pattern. The scheme was developed by Major Clendon Daukes of the 4th/7th Royal Dragoon Guards.

Techniques of developing urban camouflage have varied over time. During 1987 to 1989, the US Army's Natick Research, Development and Engineering Center (now DEVCOM Soldier Center) analyzed individual samples of terrain (ranging from rubble piles to stucco), using its Terrain Analysis System (TAS). From these samples, the TAS system gathered spectrophotometric data in order to determine the most prominent colours. This was known as the "clustering" procedure, where pixels of the scene were grouped by colour into "domains". These domains provided data that represented the range of colours in the scene, through mean colour difference and CIELAB values. The results provided by the TAS were used to assist in developing candidate urban camouflage patterns. Spectrophotometric data obtained from the 15 urban scenes, of rubble piles and building walls, varied over almost the entire color gamut, although, were concentrated mostly in the red, orange, yellow and neutral regions of color space.

In 1994, the US Army developed and evaluated two 2-colour and one 3-colour prototype camouflage patterns for a projected Military Operations on Urbanized Terrain (MOUT) camouflage uniform. The patterns showed promise but were never adopted.

== Gallery ==
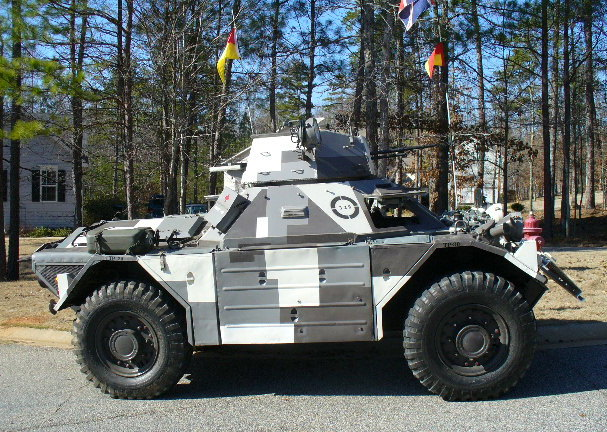
A Ferret Scout Car in Berlin camouflage

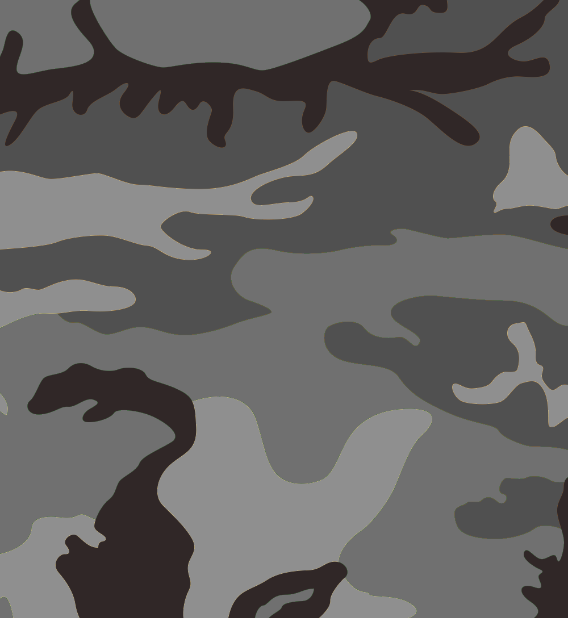
Urban variant of the Woodland pattern

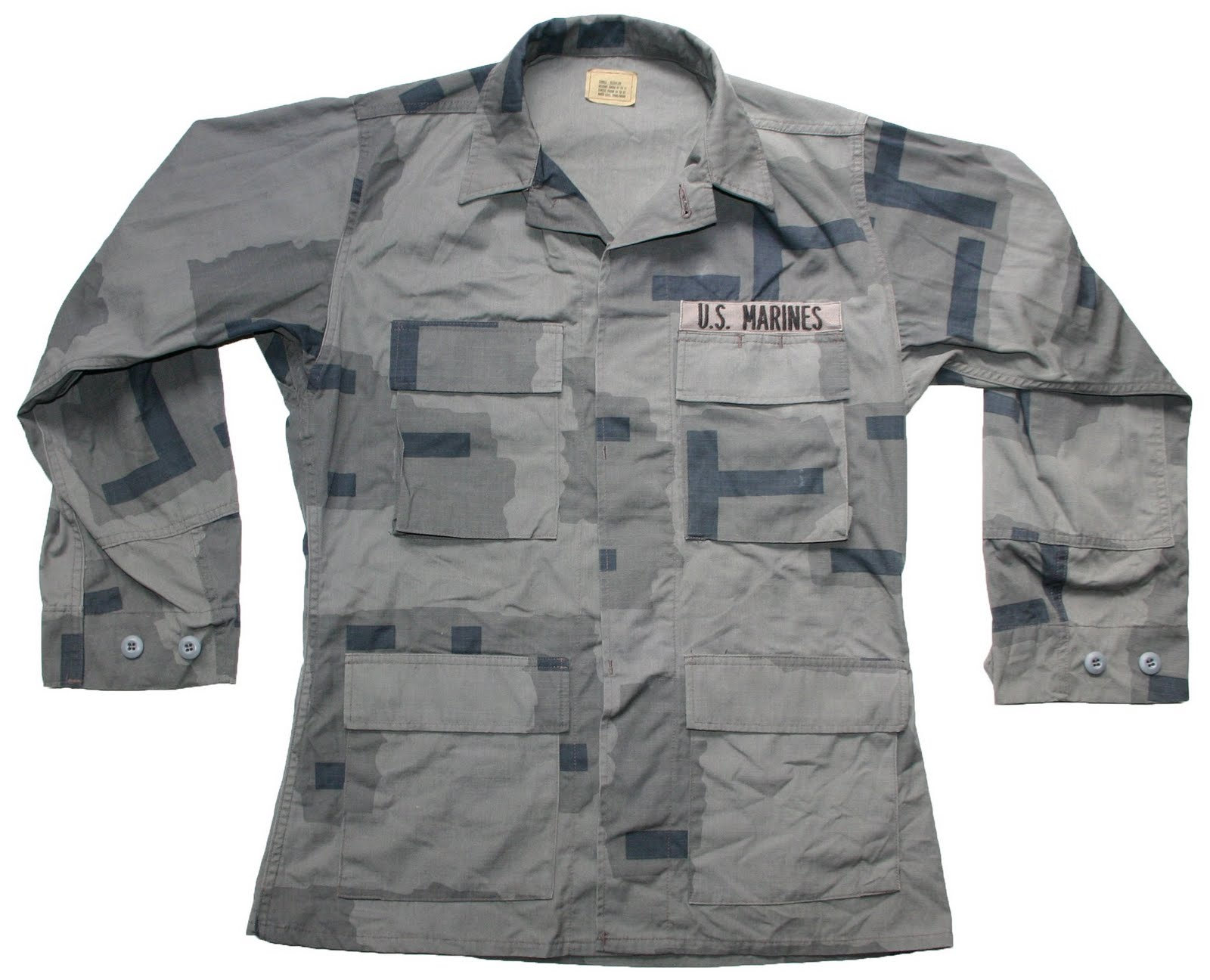
US Marine Corps MOUT T-pattern or T-block prototype, 1990s

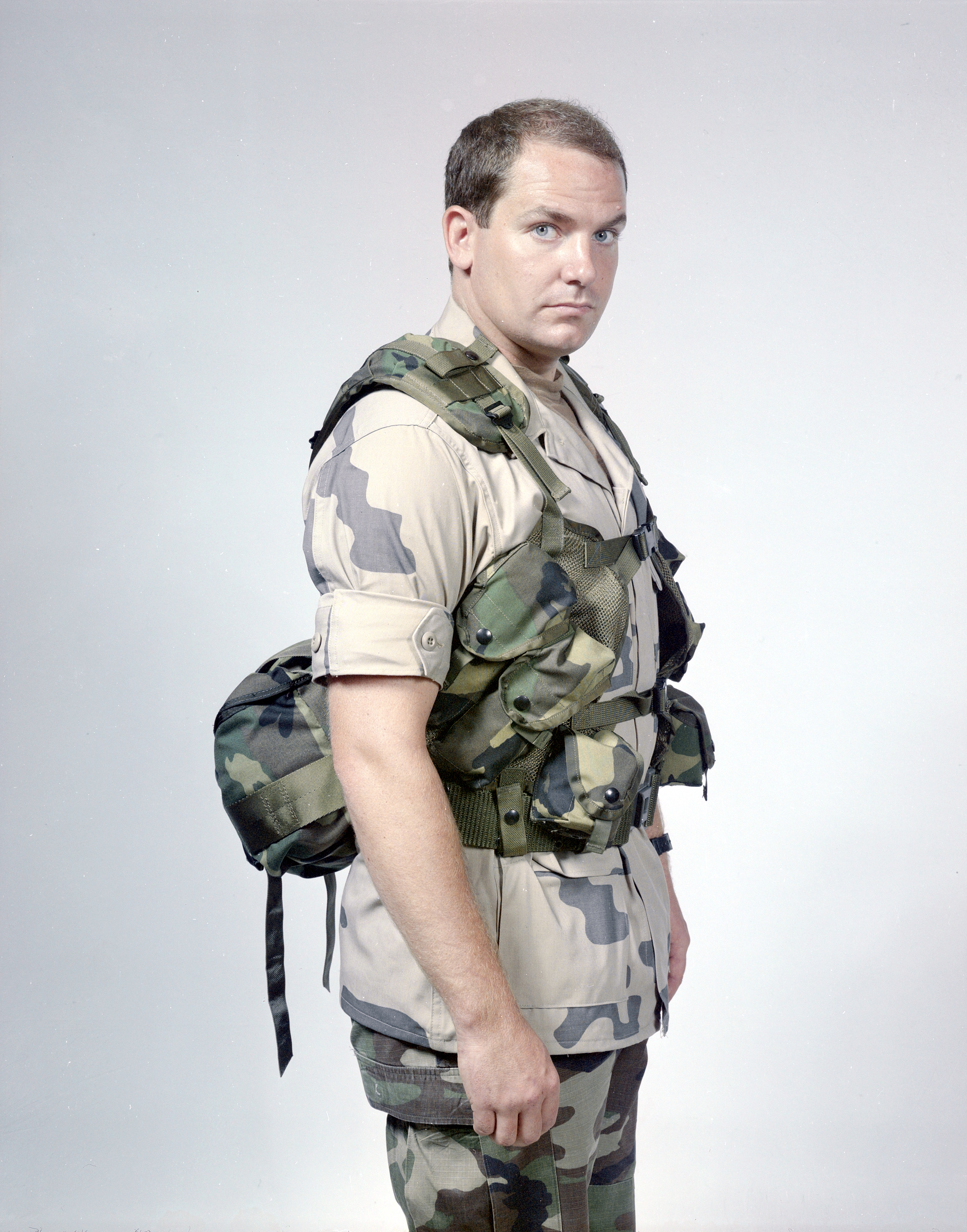
2-color urban, 1994

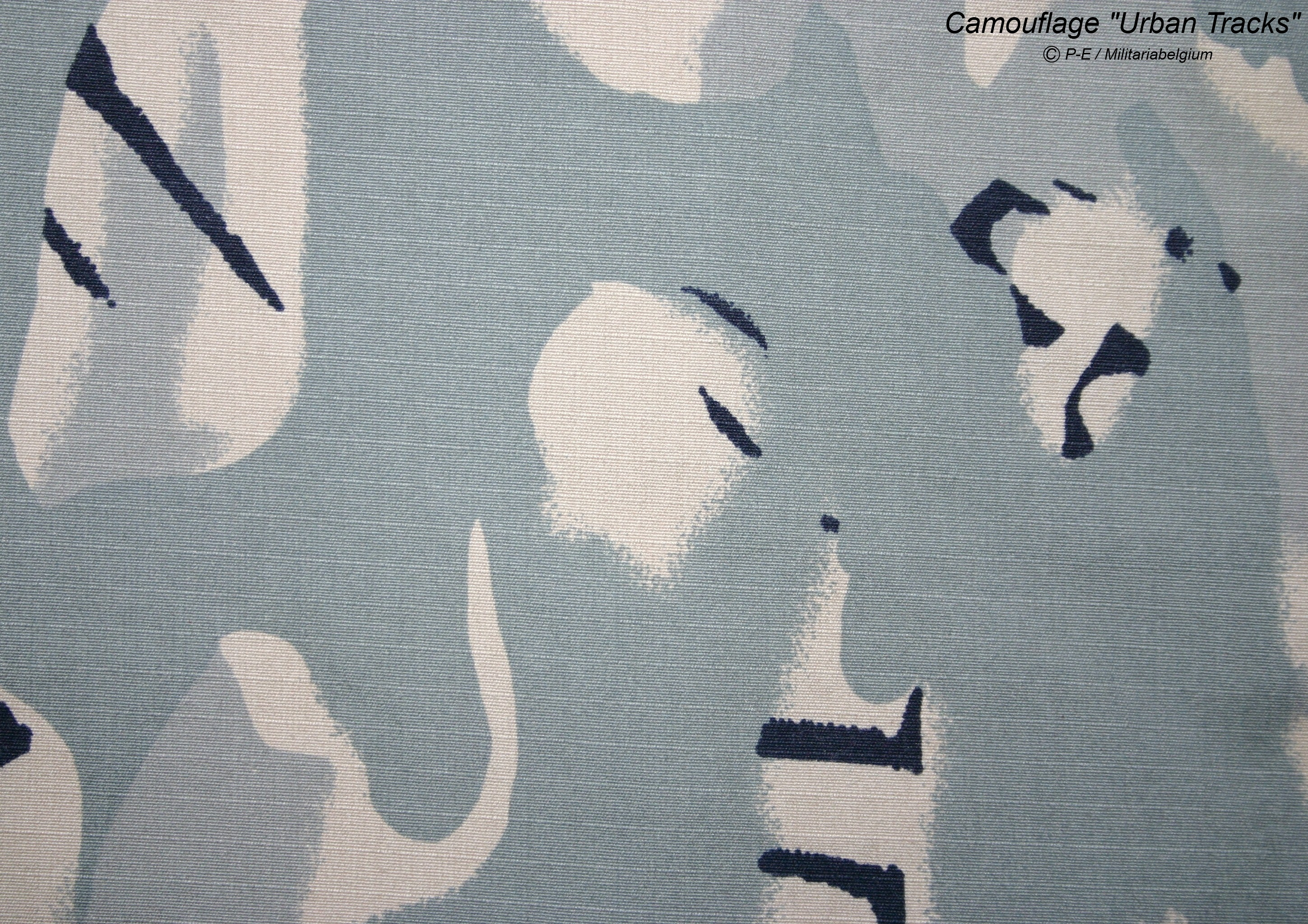
Natick's Urban Track prototype, 2000s

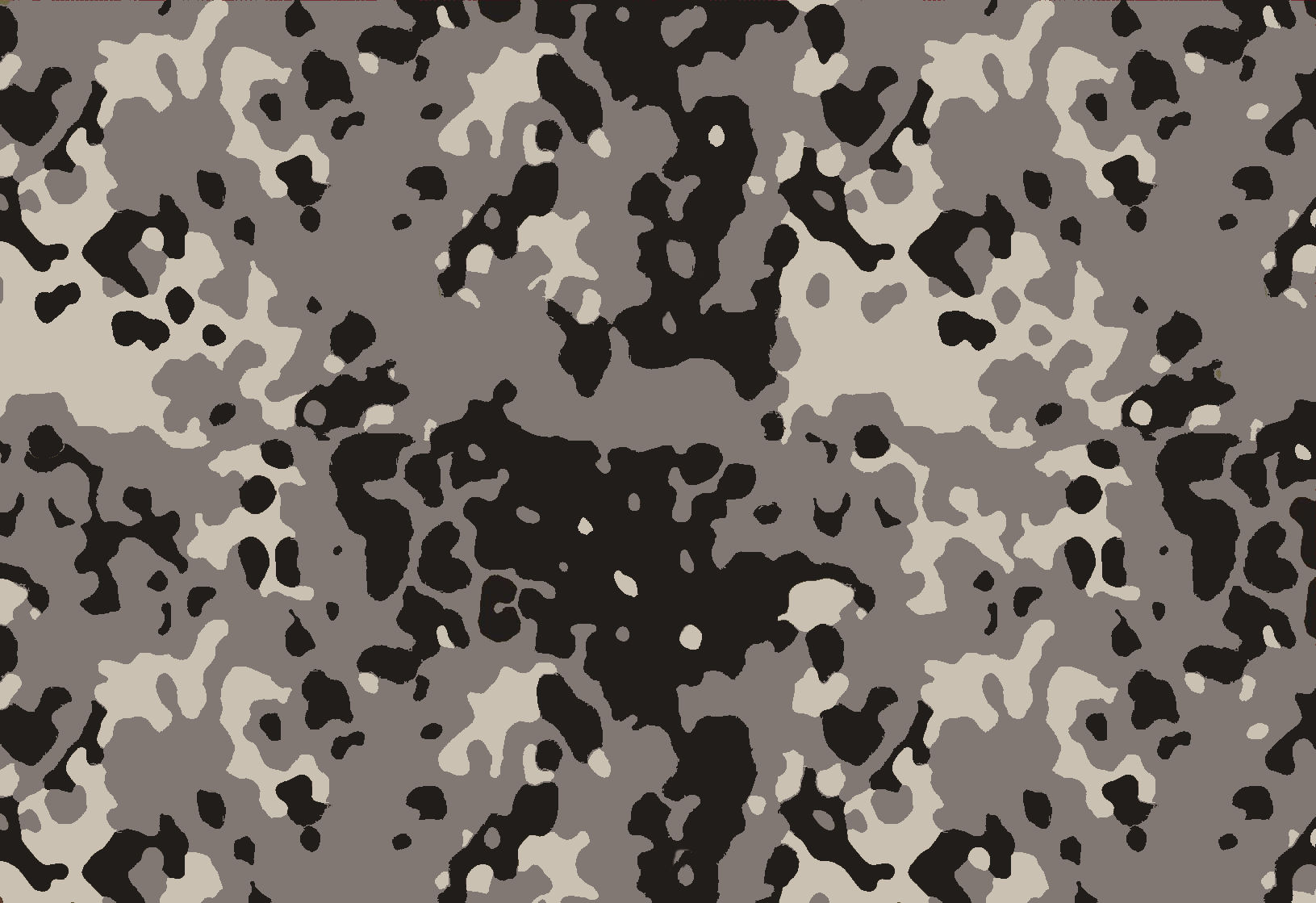
Prototype M84 urban variant

== See also ==
- Urban Warrior
