= International Security Studies Program (Fletcher School) =

Coordinates: 42°24′27.58″N 71°07′18.08″W

International Security Studies Program (ISSP)
- Formation: 1971
- Founder: Uri Ra'anan, Robert L. Pfaltzgraff Jr.
- Type: Educational and research organization
- Purpose: Security studies education and policy research within international relations
- Location: Medford, Massachusetts
- Director: Richard H. Shultz Jr.
- Parent organization: The Fletcher School of Law and Diplomacy, Tufts University
- Subsidiaries: Fletcher Security Review (journal)
- Website: https://sites.tufts.edu/issp/

The Fletcher School's International Security Studies Program (ISSP or ISS) is a center for the study of international security studies and security policy development. It was established in 1971 at The Fletcher School of Law and Diplomacy, Tufts University. ISSP conducts its academic activity through courses, simulations, conferences, and research. It also has a military fellows program for midcareer U.S. officers.

== History ==
Prior to the establishment of ISSP, the Fletcher School was already offering courses in security studies, with also a significant number of master and PhD theses exploring the political-military and security-related topics.

In 1971 ISSP was established with the financial support of the Scaife Family Charitable Trust. With it came a more formalized program and expanded course offering.

The Fletcher School has until now had no coordinated and defined program of studies enabling a candidate for a graduate degree to concentrate on security affairs, and we know of no school which offers such a program.(...) International Security Affairs [as a concentration field, would focus on] the study of the evolution and impact of the threat or use of organized force in subnational, national, and international affairs, including concerns and efforts for the limitation, termination, or elimination of the use of such force.

— Application for Support to Establish a New Field of Graduate Specialization in International Security Affairs, February 15, 1971

The program was founded during the tenure of Dean Edmund A. Gullion (a former diplomat in Vietnam, and deputy director of the U.S. Disarmament Administration). Professor Uri Ra'anan, faculty member at the Fletcher School since 1968, become the first chairman of ISSP. In the creation of the program, he was assisted by his colleague Robert Pfaltzgraff. Upon Ra'anan's departure from the school in 1987 to join Boston University, Pfaltzgraff succeeded him, taking the title of director. He was succeeded by Richard Shultz in 1989.

ISSP followed its contemporary developments, in its first 20 years focusing on issues like the Cold War, nuclear proliferation, European security, crisis management, low intensity conflict and intelligence. Shortly after the end of the Cold War, in 1991, the ISSP in cooperation with Columbia University's International Security Policy Program, and the National Strategy Information Center, conducted an extensive curriculum review. This joint effort resulted in the publication of two books: Security Studies for the 1990s (1993) followed by an updated Security Studies for the 21st Century (1997). In them, security specialists were asked to review the curriculum of their subfields in light of the dramatic changes in global politics, with each author providing a syllabus for a graduate course along with analysis essays, and brief critiques. The books advocated for a broadened scope of the field, that had previously over-emphasized deterrence (in the Western alliance and the post-1945), to also include peace missions, non-military instruments of power and the influence of culture and values.

In 2005 the Jebsen Center for Counter-Terrorism Studies was established within ISSP. Its purpose was increasing the understanding and competency of counter-terrorism professionals. Two main areas of research were predicting, preventing and preempting terrorist activity, and the role of women and business in the campaign against terrorism. Its activities included the creation of a database that collected historical data on the life paths of hundreds of terrorists and analyzed their letters, wills, and interviews. This information, based on open-source data, was used to identify the factors that tend to predict terrorist acts. Russell D. Howard, a retired U.S. Army general and Founding Director of the Combating Terrorism Center at West Point, was appointed as the director of the center. The center was funded by Jan Henrik Jebsen, a Norwegian businessman and philanthropist, with a three-year grant of $1.5 million. The center closed in 2008, after three years of activity.

== Scope and methodology ==
ISSP places security studies within the broader framework of international relations. It offers courses on time-tested subjects, namely role of force, crisis management, military strategy, decision making, intelligence, civil-military relations. It also has followed the contemporary developments, studying salient issues of each period like the Cold War, wars of national liberation, nuclear proliferation, collective security, low-intensity conflict, non-state actors. These studies have benefited of being in conjunction with the other fields of study in the school, including regional studies, and courses of political science, history, economics, and law, as the set of factors that either condition, influence or limit armed conflict.

An emphasis is placed in the civil-military exchanges as well as fomenting interactions between US and foreign students. Professor Robert L. Pfaltzgraff highlighted the importance of the international aspect of the school by pointing that "It's much more beneficial for the students from the US to have experience with students from elsewhere," arguing that the "US national security is set within an international security setting."

== Activities ==
=== Simulex ===
Since 1974 ISSP has conducted annually an international crisis simulation, called Simulex, that spans over two days. The simulation puts real countries in hypothetical but realistic crisis situations. Students are teamed into the civil and military leadership of each country involved, need to react to sudden and mounting crises, make decisions, and report those to the Control Team, who oversees and manages the evolution of the entire scenario. These decisions can be of economic, military or diplomatic nature. Organizers and participants in the simulation also include members of the U.S. Army, Navy, Marine Corps, and Air Force, from multiple institutions including the continuing involvement of the United States Army War College.

Since the inception of Simulex, Professor Robert Pfaltzgraff has designed the scenarios, which typically reflect contemporary tensions and developments. Notably, Simulex 1989 scenario envisioned the fall of the Berlin Wall, which was played one week before the actual event.

=== Annual security conference and guest speakers ===
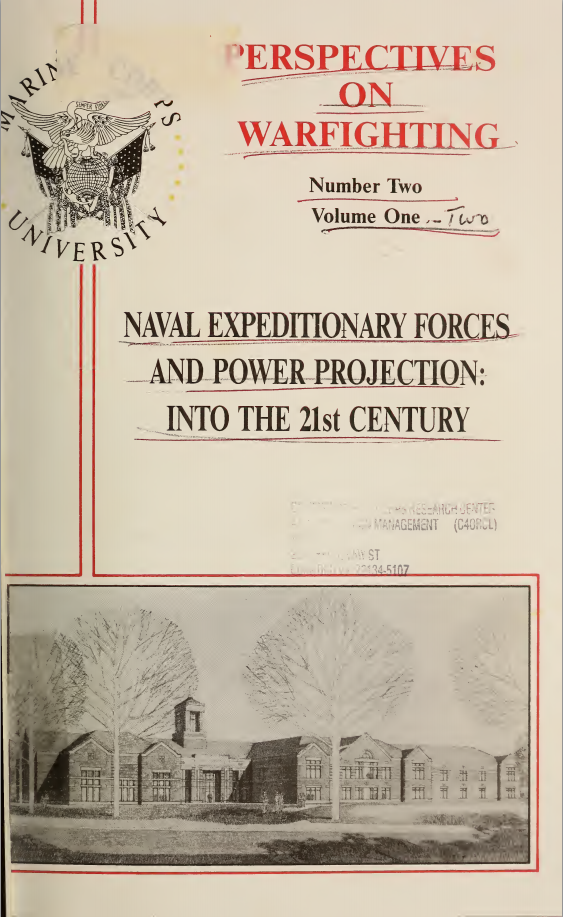
Front cover of "Naval expeditionary forces and power projection : into the 21st century", published in 1992 by the Marine Corps University, stemming from a 1991 conference conducted by ISSP

ISSP jointly with the Institute for Foreign Policy Analysis (IFPA) hold an annual security conference since 1972, focusing on topical issues of contemporary relevance. These conferences have had cosponsors including the U.S. Army, Air Force, the Office of Net Assessment, and the Marine Corps University. Attendance include participants from the U.S. Congress, the military, and academia, as well as other civilians from the U.S. and abroad. ISSP and IFPA have published a book, briefing, or report after each annual conference, outlining the contributions of the participants.

In 2013, ISSP and IFPA held their 40th annual security conference, in cooperation with U.S. Special Operations Command (USSOCOM). The conference, titled "Positioning Special Operations Forces for Global Challenges", was attended, among other speakers, by Adm. William H. McRaven (USN, commander, USSOCOM), Congressman Buck McKeon (chairman, House Armed Services Committee), Ambassador Thomas R. Pickering, and Deputy Secretary of Defense Ashton Carter.

ISSP also holds individual speaker series, with civilian policymakers and military commanders invited as guest speakers talking on diverse issues such as the North Korea nuclear program, Nicaraguan insurgency, or the role of the U.S. Air Force in the Gulf War. Some notable speakers have been Gen. David Petraeus, Gen. Stanley A. McChrystal, Gen. Carter Ham, Jamie Morin (Acting Undersecretary of the US Air Force), David Sanger, (Chief Washington Correspondent for The New York Times), Javier Solana (Secretary-General of the Council of the European Union).

== Advanced programs ==
Besides ISSP's course offering, it also has a program for mid-career military officers, and a doctoral program.

=== ISS Senior Military Fellows Program ===
In addition to military personnel enrolling in the standard degrees at the school, every year select field grade officers from all branches of the US Armed Forces are sponsored as fellows to go study at the Fletcher School, in lieu of attending war college. This includes the Marine Corps, which in 1985 started to sponsor Commandants of the Marine Corps as fellows to study at ISSP.

Major Jay L. Hatton positively valued this program, pointing that the breadth and depth of Fletcher's educational experience provide the knowledge and analytical skills enabling them to access policy-making or scholarly posts. These include becoming faculty at the Marine Corps University, a staff officer at Headquarters Marine Corps, or working on peacekeeping operations. He also highlighted the value of bringing diversity of views to the school, and the value of the fellow's academic research in informing policy. Graduates from the program have also reached the rank of flag officer.

=== Doctoral program ===
ISSP offers a doctoral program. From 1971 to 1991, it awarded 73 PhDs, many being on the Cold War, but also other topics like transnational terrorism, the implications of a multinuclear world, nonviolent resistance movements, counterinsurgency strategy, and crisis decision-making. In the post-cold war period between 1991 and 2013, 112 more PhD dissertations were completed. Dissertation topics included WMD proliferation, counterterrorism strategy and policy, humanitarian interventions, the management of non-traditional crises, strategic information warfare, cyber space, rethinking deterrence, special operations, and the changing dimensions of alliances and security cooperation.

== Journal ==
In 2013 ISSP launched the Fletcher Security Review, an online academic journal. Haider Ali Hussein Mullick, adjunct professor at the Naval War College, became its first editor-in-chief.

== Faculty ==
=== Current ===
- Richard H. Shultz Jr. is an expert and early scholar of insurgency, with his early works including influential research on guerrilla warfare in Vietnam. He notably published The Secret War Against Hanoi, and The Marines Take Anbar. He is also an expert on terrorism, intelligence gathering and internal conflicts. Shultz has been the director of ISSP since 1989. He entered the Fletcher School in 1983, and was the Associate Professor and later Professor of International Politics. Shultz has served on the Special Operations Policy Advisory Group of the U.S. Department of Defense, where he was the only civilian in that position. He has also done security research and served as advisor for several U.S. civil and military organizations, and held chairs at the U.S. Military Academy, U.S. Naval War College, and the U.S. Department of Defense. He has testified in the U.S. congress.

=== Former ===
- Uri Ra'anan was an international security scholar with research focus on soviet and post-soviet issues. He was the Professor of International Politics at Fletcher from 1967 to 1987, and headed ISSP from its inception until 1987. Concurrently, he was the director of Boston University's Center for the Study of Ideology, Conflict and Policy. After Fletcher Ra'anan worked at Boston University until his retirement in 2009. He has also taught at MIT, Columbia University, and the City University of New York. He was an advisor of U.S. President Ronald Reagan. Ra'anan was a refugee escaping Hitler's Europe in 1939.
- William C. Martel specialized in studying the leadership and policymaking processes in organizations, strategic planning, cyber and space, and technology innovation. He was an Associate Professor of International Security Studies at the Fletcher School, until his death in 2015. He had also taught at the U.S. Air War College and U.S. Naval War College, done research in DARPA, and has been an Advisor to the U.S. Air Force.
- Robert L. Pfaltzgraff Jr. is a political scientist specialized in security policy, international relations theory and crisis management. He entered the Fletcher Faculty in 1970, and is the Shelby Cullom Davis Professor of International Security Studies at Fletcher. He is also the founder and president of the Institute for Foreign Policy Analysis, a policy consulting organization. He also served as the director of the ISSP at Fletcher. He has testified in the U.S. congress.
- Antonia Handler Chayes, is Professor of Practice in International Politics. She previously taught at the Kennedy School of Government, Harvard, and the Harvard Law School. She specializes in international treaties, international security and arms control, and civil military relations. During the Carter Administration she was Assistant and later, Under Secretary of the US Air Force, where she was awarded the Distinguished Service Medal. She has served on several Federal Commissions, including the Commission on Roles and Missions of the United States Armed Forces. She is a member of the Council on Foreign Relations. She has served as a consultant to the Office of Compliance, Adviser, Ombudsman of IFC and MIGA of the World Bank and served on the Executive Council of the American Society of International Law since 2009. Chayes was a Board member of United Technologies Corporation for 21 years, and was Vice Chair and Senior Consultant of Conflict Management Group (CMG), a non-profit international dispute resolution organization.

== Prominent alumni ==
Some prominent alumni include:

- Admiral James G. Stavridis, former Supreme Allied Commander NATO, Europe.
- Dr. Konstantine Karamanlis, former the Prime Minister of Greece.
- Admiral Patrick M. Walsh former commander of the U.S. Pacific Fleet, former Vice Chief of Naval Operations.
- General Joseph F. Dunford Jr.

== Publications ==
=== Conference books and reports ===
For each annual conference, ISSP published a book or report to encapsulate the topics discussed. The publications range from collections of presented essays, to transcripts or summaries of speaker sessions.

Conference books and reports 1970's
- European security and the Nixon doctrine (1st annual conference, 1972), edited by Harry H. Bendorf (The Fletcher School of Law and Diplomacy, 1973) OCLC 1913721
- The other arms race : new technologies and non-nuclear conflict (3rd annual conference, 1974), edited by Geoffrey Kemp, Robert L. Pfaltzgraff Jr., Uri Ra'anan. (Lexington Books, 1975) ISBN 0669982776
- *Arms Transfers to the Third World: The Military Buildup in Less Industrial Countries (5th annual conference, 1976), edited by Uri Ra'anan (Westview, 1978) ISBN 0891580832
Conference books and reports 1980's
- Projection of power : perspectives, perceptions, and problems (9th annual conference, 1980), edited by Uri Ra'anan, Robert L. Pfaltzgraff Jr., Geoffrey Kemp. (Archon Books, 1982) ISBN 0208019545
- National security policy : the decision-making process (1983) (12th annual conference) (ISBN 0895490544)
- Intelligence policy and national security, edited by Robert L. Pfaltzgraff Jr., Uri Ra'anan and Warren Milberg (1981) (conference, 1979) ISBN 0208019189
- The U.S. defense mobilization infrastructure : problems and priorities : a conference report, edited by Robert L Pfaltzgraff, Uri Ra'anan (Archon, 1983) (conference, 1981) ISBN 0208019847
- International security dimensions of space, edited by Uri Ra'anan and Robert L. Pfaltzgraff Jr. (11th annual conference, 1982) (Archon, 1984) ISBN 0208020233
- National Security Policy: The Decision-Making Process, edited by Pfaltzgraff, Robert L., Jr, and Uri Ra'anan (conference, 1983) (Archon, 1984) ISBN 0208020039
- Security commitments and capabilities : elements of an American global strategy, edited by Uri Ra'anan, Robert L. Pfaltzgraff Jr. (13th annual conference, 1984) (Archon, 1985) ISBN 0208020950
- Strategic Minerals and International Security, Edited by Ra'anan, Uri, and Charles M. Perry. (ISSP-IFPA conference, 1984) (Pergamon-Brassey's International Defense Publishers, 1985) (ISBN 0080331572)
- Selling the Rope to Hang Capitalism? the Debate on West-East Trade & Technology Transfer, edited by Perry, Charles M., and Pfaltzgraff, Robert L., Jr. (Pergamon-Brassey's, 1987) (ISSP-IFPA conference, 1985) ISBN 0080349595 OCLC 13517402
- Terrorism and other "low-intensity" operations : international linkages (Institute For Foreign Policy Analysis, 1985) (14th annual conference, 1985) ISBN 0895490676 OCLC 15088827
- Protracted warfare--the Third World arena : a dimension of U.S.-Soviet conflict, edited by Chung Min Lee (ISSP-IFPA 16th conference, 1987, co-sponsors: U.S. Army War College, National Defense University) (Institute for Foreign Policy Analysis, 1987) ISBN 0895490846
- Emerging Doctrines and Technologies: Implications for Global and Regional Political-Military Balances, edited by Pfaltzgraff, Robert L., Jr. (15th annual conference, 1988) (Macmillan, New York, 1988) ISBN 066916755X
- Guerrilla warfare and counterinsurgency : U.S.-Soviet policy in the Third World, edited by Richard H. Shultz Jr. et al. (ISSP Conference 1987, co-sponsors: U.S. Army War College and the National Defense University) (Lexington Books, 1989) ISBN 0669199346
- U.S. Defense Policy in an Era of Constrained Resources., edited by Pfaltzgraff, Robert L., Jr, and Shultz, Richard H., Jr. (17th annual conference, 1988, co-sponsored by the National Defense University) (Macmillan/ Lexington Books, 1990). ISBN 0669213586
Conference books and reports 1990's
- The United States Army : challenges and missions for the 1990s, edited by Robert L. Pfaltzgraff Jr., Richard H. Schultz Jr. (conference, 1989, co-sponsors: Army War College, and the National Defense University) (Lexington Books, 1991) ISBN 066927562X
- The Future of air power in the aftermath of the Gulf War, edited by Richard H. Shultz Jr., Robert L. Pfaltzgraff, Jr' (19th annual conference, 1991) (Maxwell Air Force Base, Ala. Air University Press, 1992) OCLC 257230913
- Ethnic Conflict and Regional Instability: Implications for U.S. Policy and U.S. Army Roles and Missions, edited by Robert L. Pfaltzgraff, Richard H. Shultz (Strategic Studies Institute, US Army War College, 1994)
- War in the information age (ISSP-IFPA conference, 1995, co-sponsors: Office of the Deputy Chief of Staff for Operations and Plans, U.S. Army, Louisiana Maneuvers Task Force, U.S. Army War College) (Institute for Foreign Policy Analysis, 1996.) OCLC 38942172
- Strategy, Force Structure, and Defense Planning for the Twenty-First Century (ISSP-IFPA conference, co-sponsors: Office of the Deputy Chief of Staff of the Army for Operations and Planning, the Office of the Secretary of Defense for Net Assessment, the Army War College) (Institute for Foreign Policy Analysis, 1997) OCLC 640490120
- Security in Southeastern Europe and the U.S.-Greek relationship (ISSP-IFPA conference, 1997, co-sponsored: The Constantinos G. Karamanlis Foundation, and The Lillian Voudouris Foundation) OCLC 607016874
- The United States as a 21st Century Aerospace Power: Strategic Control and National Security (conference 1999, co-sponsors: Air Force. Office of the Deputy Chief of Staff, Plans and Programs) (Institute for Foreign Policy Analysis, 1999) OCLC 44679429
Conference books and reports 2000's
- Strategic Responsiveness Early and Continuous Joint Effectiveness Across the Spectrum, edited by Fenzel, Michael R.; Hornbarger, Christopher E. (ISSP-IFPA conference, 2000, co-sponsors: co-sponsorship of the Office of the Deputy Chief of Staff, U.S. Army; the Office of the Secretary of Defense for Net Assessment)
- National strategies and capabilities for a changing world (ISSP-IFPA conference, 2000) (U.S. Army War College, 2000) OCLC 50318060
- National security for a new era : focusing national power, edited by Captain Omar J. Jones and Kelley Reese (ISSP-IFPA conference, 2001, co-sponsors: Office of the Secretary of Defense, Net assessment, and the United States Army) (U.S. Dept. of the Army, 2001) OCLC 51450750
- The 33rd IFPA-Fletcher Conference on National Security Strategy and Policy (2002)
- Meeting the homeland security challenge : maritime and other critical dimensions, edited by Tim Campbell; Madhavi Chavali; Kelley Reese (ISSP-IFPA conference, 2002, co-sponsored: The United States Coast Guard, the Defense Threat Reduction Agency) OCLC 53344803
- Nuclear Energy and Science for the 21st Century, Atoms for Peace +50,(ISSP-IFPA conference, co-sponsored: U.S. Department of Energy, the Dwight D. Eisenhower Library & Museum) (2003) OCLC 56888687
- Security Planning and Military Transformation after Iraqi Freedom (ISSP-IFPA 34th annual conference, 2003, sponsored by The United States Navy The Defense Threat Reduction Agency)
- National Security Strategy and Policy: Planning for and Responding to Threats to the U.S. Homeland (ISSP-IFPA 35th annual conference, 2004, co-sponsors: United States Northern Command, Defense Threat Reduction Agency)
- Nuclear & non-nuclear forces in twenty-first-century deterrence (ISSP-IFPA 36th annual conference, 2006, co-sponsorship of: U.S. Strategic Command, The National Nuclear Security Administration of The Department of Energy, The Office of the Secretary of Defense (Policy), The Defense Threat Reduction Agency) (Institute for Foreign Policy Analysis, 2006) OCLC 135227900
- A new maritime strategy for twenty-first-century national security (ISSP-IFPA 37th annual conference, 2007, co-sponsors: Naval War College, Defense Threat Reduction Agency) (Institute for Foreign Policy Analysis, 2007) OCLC 801682091
Conference books and reports 2010's
- National Security Strategy and Policy: Air, Space, & Cyberspace Power in the 21st Century (ISSP-IFPA 38th annual conference, 2010, co-sponsors: The Air Force Chief of Staff's Strategic Studies Group, The Defense Threat Reduction Agency) OCLC 689276065
- The Marine Corps: America's Expeditionary Force in Readiness (2011)(ISSP-IFPA 39th annual conference, 2011)

=== Other publications ===
- American sea power and global strategy (Pergamon-Brassey's, cop. 1985), by Robert J. Hanks. ISBN 0080331718 OCLC 12554657
- Naval expeditionary forces and power projection : into the 21st century, (Command and Staff College Foundation, 1993.) OCLC 32772839
- Security Studies for the 1990s, edited by Richard Shultz, Roy Godson, and Ted Greenwood (New York: Brassey's, 1993) ISBN 0028810724
- Ethnic Conflict and Regional Instability: Implications for U.S. Policy and U.S. Anny Roles and Missions (Carlisle Barracks, Perma.: Strategic Studies Institute, U.S. Army War College, 1994) OCLC 30601713
- The national security strategy and the Korean Peninsula, by Murray A Neeper (U.S. Army War College, 1995) OCLC 53448301
- Security Studies for the 21st Century, edited by Richard H. Shultz Jr., Roy Godson, and George Quester (Washington/ London: Brassey's, 1997) ISBN 1574880667
- The Role of Naval Forces in 21st Century Operations, edited by Richard H. Shultz, Robert L. Pfaltzgraff (Brassey's, 2000) (ISBN 1574882562)
