= War on terror and the media =

Media framing of (and media influenced by) the war on terror

The mass media is recognised as playing a significant role in the war on terror, both in regard to perpetuating and shaping particular understandings of the motivations of the United States and its allies in undertaking the 2001 invasion of Afghanistan and 2003 invasion of Iraq, as well as sustaining cultural perceptions of the global threat from terrorism in the wake of the September 11 attacks.

Political theorist Richard Jackson argues that "the 'war on terrorism' [...] is simultaneously a set of actual practices—wars, covert operations, agencies, and institutions—and an accompanying series of assumptions, beliefs, justifications, and narratives—it is an entire language or discourse". Jackson notes that such political discourses only rise to prominence when other social actors, like the media, reproduce the language across wider society and that, following the September 11 attacks, the media reproduced official discourse "in a relatively unmediated fashion, while at the same time silencing and marginalising alternative narratives".

Similarly, David Holloway states the "idea of a war on terror was itself a representation of events, a rhetorical construction, a series of stories about 9/11 and about America's place in the world".

== Background ==
The war on terror, officially the Global War on Terrorism, is a global military campaign initiated by the United States following the September 11 attacks. The main targets of the campaign are militant Islamist movements like Al-Qaeda, Taliban and their allies. Other major targets included the Ba'athist regime in Iraq, which was deposed in an invasion in 2003, and various militant factions that fought during the ensuing insurgency.

In October 2001, an Entertainment Industry Task Force was secretly formed, bringing together prominent Hollywood figures with high-level military members, to discuss potential attack scenarios in the hope these might expose vulnerabilities in the US's counterterrorism capabilities. According to attendee James Korris, several scenarios that were posited in these meetings ended up in films.

A month later, in November, Hollywood executives met with George W. Bush's senior advisor Karl Rove, to discuss entertainment industry cooperation in the war on terror, though Rove denied the government intended to shape the content of movies or television shows specifically.

In the music industry, however, a number of instances did demonstrate explicit curtailment of content. For example, the Clear Channel memorandum was a list of songs among US radio stations deemed "questionable" following the September 11 attacks, with the suggestion that stations did not play them.

== Media framing of the war on terror ==
Researchers in communication studies and political science found that American understanding of the "war on terror" is directly shaped by how mainstream news media reports events associated with the conflict. Jim A. Kuypers illustrates how "the press failed America in its coverage on the war on terror". Kuypers labelled the mainstream news media an "anti-democratic institution" in its uncritical approach to the administration's discursive framing of the war. Indeed, studies of corporate news coverage of the September 11 attacks demonstrated the extent to which the media contributed to a significant narrowing of public discourse by neglecting to provide an outline of the wider political motivations of the attackers.

Douglas Kellner identified the post-September 11 media coverage's "exceptionally impoverished understanding of the historical context of terrorism and war". Jackson concurs, stating the media responded to the attacks "with a great deal of patriotism, self-censorship, oversensitivity to public opinion and deference to authority".

Others have suggested press coverage contributed to public confusion and misinformation about both the nature and level of the threat to the U.S. posed by terrorism. Ian Lustick claims the media "have given constant attention to possible terrorist-initiated catastrophes and to the failures and weaknesses of the government's response". Lustick alleges the war on terror is disconnected from the real but remote threat terrorism poses and that the generalized war on terror began as part of the justification for invading Iraq, before taking on a life of its own, fueled by such media coverage. Similarly, Scott Atran writes that "publicity is the oxygen of terrorism" and that rapid growth of international communicative networks renders publicity even more potent, with the result that "perhaps never in the history of human conflict have so few people with so few actual means and capabilities frightened so many".

Looking at the role of online bloggers in resisting and countering official narratives about the war, Stephen D. Cooper analysed several examples of controversies concerning mainstream reporting of the war on terror. He observed four key points:

- Mainstream reporting of the war on terror has frequently contained factual inaccuracies. In some cases, the errors go uncorrected: moreover, when corrections are issued they usually are given far less prominence than the initial coverage containing the errors
- The mainstream press has sometimes failed to check the provenance of information or visual images supplied by Iraqi "stringers" (local Iraqis hired to relay local news)
- Story framing is often problematic: in particular, "man-in-the-street" interviews have often been used as a representation of public sentiment in Iraq, in place of methodologically sound survey data
- Mainstream reporting has tended to concentrate on the more violent areas of Iraq, with little or no reporting of the calm areas

== Media influenced by the war on terror ==
Some scholars have observed the way in which the war on terror shapes terrorism in the public social imaginary. Holloway looks at narratives of trauma relating to the September 11 attacks, arguing how the saturation, repetition and amplification of the events in the media in the weeks after underscored the extent to which "journalists themselves helped construct the event as trauma".

Michael Frank notes the public discourse on terrorism, particularly sub-state, has "spawned numerous terrorist plots in literature and film". He explores the way in which literary and cinematic narratives overlap with wider discourse on terrorism, arguing both draw on and contribute to a common imaginary. In the process, he argues, "the discursive boundary between the factual and the non-factual can become difficult to discern, as public discourse both feeds on, and feeds back into, fiction – and vice versa". Observing how "terrorism systematically exploits the anticipatory nature of fear", Frank observes how the imaginary of terrorism may premeditate events in the world, shaping expectations and the construction of meaning.

Likewise, Holloway writes that – from the start – the events of September 11 and subsequent "war on terror" became so indivisible from their representations in political rhetoric, mass media spectacle, as well as films, novels, photographs, paintings, and TV dramas, that they came to feel pervasive. He notes the "rapid accommodation of modish post-9/11 themes within established drama series" like ER and The West Wing and proliferation of new television dramas incorporating the same themes.

Cataloguing a series of allegorical references to the attacks in movies like The Village and War of the Worlds, he shows how the latter in particular tapped into and exploited popular anxiety, simultaneously reproducing it as a "palpable and insistent reality in everyday life". He notes the film's multiple signposted references to the September 11 attacks:

A panicked crowd in a city street fled a gigantic debris cloud. An aeroplane crashed into a house, leaving bits of its undercarriage prominently displayed to the camera in the wreckage. American refugees flooded roads usually choked with vehicles, while collages of photos and cards mounted on streetlamps, hydrants and booths showed images of the 'missing'. Other scenes evoked the horror of 9/11 more allusively. Corpses drifted down the Hudson River. The white ash remains of pulverised buildings and human bodies, and the empty clothes of dead Americans, floated from the sky.
