= Dezinformatsia (book) =

1984 non-fiction book

- Dezinformatsia
- Authors: Richard H. Shultz and Roy Godson
- Original title: Dezinformatsia: Active Measures in Soviet Strategy
- Language: English
- Subject: Disinformation
- Genre: non-fiction
- Publisher: Pergamon-Brassey's
- Publication date: 1984
- Publication place: United States
- Media type: Paperback
- Pages: 210
- ISBN: 978-0-08-031573-7
- Followed by: The Soviet Union and Revolutionary Warfare (1990)

Dezinformatsia: Active Measures in Soviet Strategy (and a later edition published as Dezinformatsia: The Strategy of Soviet Disinformation) is a non-fiction book about disinformation and information warfare used by the KGB during the Soviet Union period, as part of their active measures tactics. The book was co-authored by Richard H. Shultz, professor of international politics at Tufts University, and Roy Godson, professor emeritus of government at Georgetown University.

Shultz and Godson discuss Soviet disinformation tactics including injection of Communist propaganda through covert groups within the U.S.S.R. tasked with disrupting activities of the North Atlantic Treaty Organization and the U.S. The book explains disinformation methods including forgery as covert operation, agents of influence, and using social influence to turn targets into useful idiots. They focus on disinformation activities of Soviet intelligence from 1960 to 1980. Shultz and Godson discuss case studies as examples of Soviet disinformation, including a French journalist covertly financed by Russian agents in order to publish biased material against Western interests, and the front organization activities of the World Peace Council. They back up their analyses with two Soviet intelligence defectors.

Foreign Affairs called the book a "useful survey" of how Soviet intelligence used disinformation "to further its strategic aims such as discrediting America and weakening NATO". The Journal of Conflict Studies described it as "a useful introduction to a field of knowledge" of importance to security experts, the United States Intelligence Community, and diplomats. Society called Dezinformatsia, "a highly readable and insightful book". Political Science Quarterly gave the work a negative review, criticizing the book's writing style and methodological rigor.

== Background ==
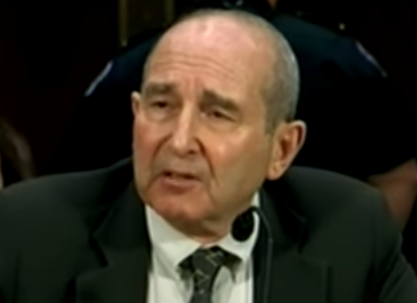
Author Roy Godson

Richard H. Shultz received his PhD in political science from Miami University in 1976, and during the period 1977–1978 did post-doctoral work at the University of Michigan. Shultz became part of The Fletcher School of Law and Diplomacy, Tufts University as international politics professor in 1983, and rose to become director of the International Security Studies Program (ISSP). Shultz was the only non-government member of the Special Operations Policy Advisory Group for the United States Department of Defense. After the publication of Dezinformatsia: Active Measures in Soviet Strategy, Shultz authored another book on Soviet war tactics: The Soviet Union and Revolutionary Warfare.

Roy Godson graduated with a PhD from Columbia University, with a focus on international politics and national security. Godson is a Georgetown University emeritus professor of government. Godson testified before the United States Senate Select Committee on Intelligence in 2017, to give background on the Senate investigation into Russian interference in the 2016 United States elections. He has served as president of the National Strategy Information Center, Washington, D.C. Godson went on to author and edit multiple other books on covert operations and intelligence, including: Dirty Tricks or Trump Cards, and Comparing Foreign Intelligence.

== Contents summary ==
Roy Godson's 2017 testimony to the United States Senate Select Committee on Intelligence, drawing from his book Dezinformatsia

Dezinformatsia describes disinformation tactics used by the intelligence services of the Soviet Union including the KGB, against foreign enemies including the United States. The authors define disinformation as: "false, incomplete, or misleading information that is passed, fed, or confirmed to a targeted individual, group, or country."

The book explains the covert groups within the Soviet Union tasked with disrupting government activities of the countries belonging to the North Atlantic Treaty Organization, and the U.S., through injection of Communist propaganda. The authors place the Soviet policy of active measures within a broader strategy of Russian military deception in favor of domestic national security. They focus their discussion on disinformation conducted by the Soviet intelligence between the period of 1960–1980.

Shultz and Godson note that manipulated groups involve both official departments of the Soviet state, as well as non-governmental organizations which lack independence from the state control itself. Specific goals exported by covert Soviet government channels and groups in the Western world were financed by Soviet intelligence operations. These covert operations were coordinated so as to have maximum impact related to major international incidents.

Graphic showing differences between disinformation, misinformation and hoax. (Wikimedia Foundation presentation)

As a case study of disinformation, the authors describe journalist Pierre-Charles Pathé, whose publication in France was secretly financed by Soviet intelligence. Its contents were biased against the Western world in favor of the Soviet agenda, and had considerable impact on public opinion. In another example, the authors bring forth an analysis of the World Peace Council, which operated as a front organization for Soviet intelligence. They discuss its operations negatively impacting both NATO and the U.S. Shultz and Godson back up their analyses with interviews from two Soviet officials who had defected from their posts in Soviet intelligence, and spoke of disinformation campaigns against Western interests.

The authors detail commonly used disinformation tactics by the Soviet intelligence agencies, including forgery as covert operation in order to fool target dupes into believing such fabricated documents were real. Additionally, the writers explain how Soviet covert spies were able to bring agents of influence into their fold and do their bidding, whether knowingly or through social influence as a useful idiot.

Shultz and Godson note that after the Soviet term dezinformatsia became widely known in the 1980s in the English language as disinformation, native speakers of English broadened the term as "any government communication (either overt or covert) containing intentionally false and misleading material, often combined selectively with true information, which seeks to mislead and manipulate either elites or a mass audience."

== Release and reception ==
Dezinformatsia was released in a paperback edition in 1984. It was issued again in paperback in 1986 under the same title, and also with the different title — Dezinformatsia: The Strategy of Soviet Disinformation.

John C. Campbell reviewed the book for the journal Foreign Affairs, and wrote: "The Shultz/Godson book is a useful survey of how the Soviet Union uses 'disinformation,' propaganda, agents, covert political techniques and front organizations to influence events in foreign countries and to further its strategic aims such as discrediting America and weakening NATO." Campbell criticized the dry nature of some of the facts revealed in the book, "Parts of the presentation are novel, but the revelations are not particularly sensational." Campbell concluded stories in the book should not be taken at face value, "The author's KGB experience and background doubtless give him a special vantage point, but most of this story can be taken with several grains of salt."

Writing in Conflict Quarterly for The Journal of Conflict Studies, David Charters questioned why the book did not present more of an analysis on the aggregate impact of all of the disinformation campaigns, before noting such a task would be difficult to assess. The reviewer asked why the book did not fully address questions including, "Did any of the forgeries described have a significant political impact on the intended target, and on U.S. relations with the country concerned, or were they merely of nuisance value?" Conflict Quarterly criticized such absence in the book and identified it as an academic deficiency, writing, "Without answers to questions such as these, it is difficult to accept, at face value, the authors' conclusions." Charters concluded the book was "a useful introduction to a field of knowledge which ... is likely to continue to expand in importance for diplomats, the intelligence community, and scholars of international security affairs.

Stephen Sloan reviewed the book for the journal Society, writing: "Richard H. Shultz and Roy Godson are to be credited for writing a highly readable and insightful book that can enable policy-makers, academics, and concerned members of the public to understand a form of political warfare that until recently was only rarely recognized in the West." He called the work "ground breaking research". Sloan concluded, "Shultz and Godson have provided an awareness of a threat that should be acted upon."

Political Science Quarterly gave a more critical assessment of the book, with reviewer Ellen Mickiewicz commenting, "In the second chapter, the discussion of the organization of Soviet foreign propaganda activities is so fuzzy as to be confusing." She criticized the rigor of the book's research methodology. Mickiewicz concluded, "This book is not the successor to Frederic Barghoorn's Soviet Foreign Propaganda (1964); the topic is timely and interesting, but it requires a more considered and informed analysis."

== See also ==
- Active measures
- Active Measures Working Group
- Counter Misinformation Team
- Denial and deception
- False flag
- Fear, uncertainty and doubt
- Forgery as covert operation
- Information warfare
- Internet manipulation
- Media censorship and disinformation during the Gezi Park protests
- Manufacturing Consent
- Operation Toucan (KGB)
- The Plot to Hack America
- Politico-media complex
- Post-truth politics
- Propaganda in the Soviet Union
- Russian military deception
- Social engineering (political science)
- Persuasion
