= Commercial Hunter =

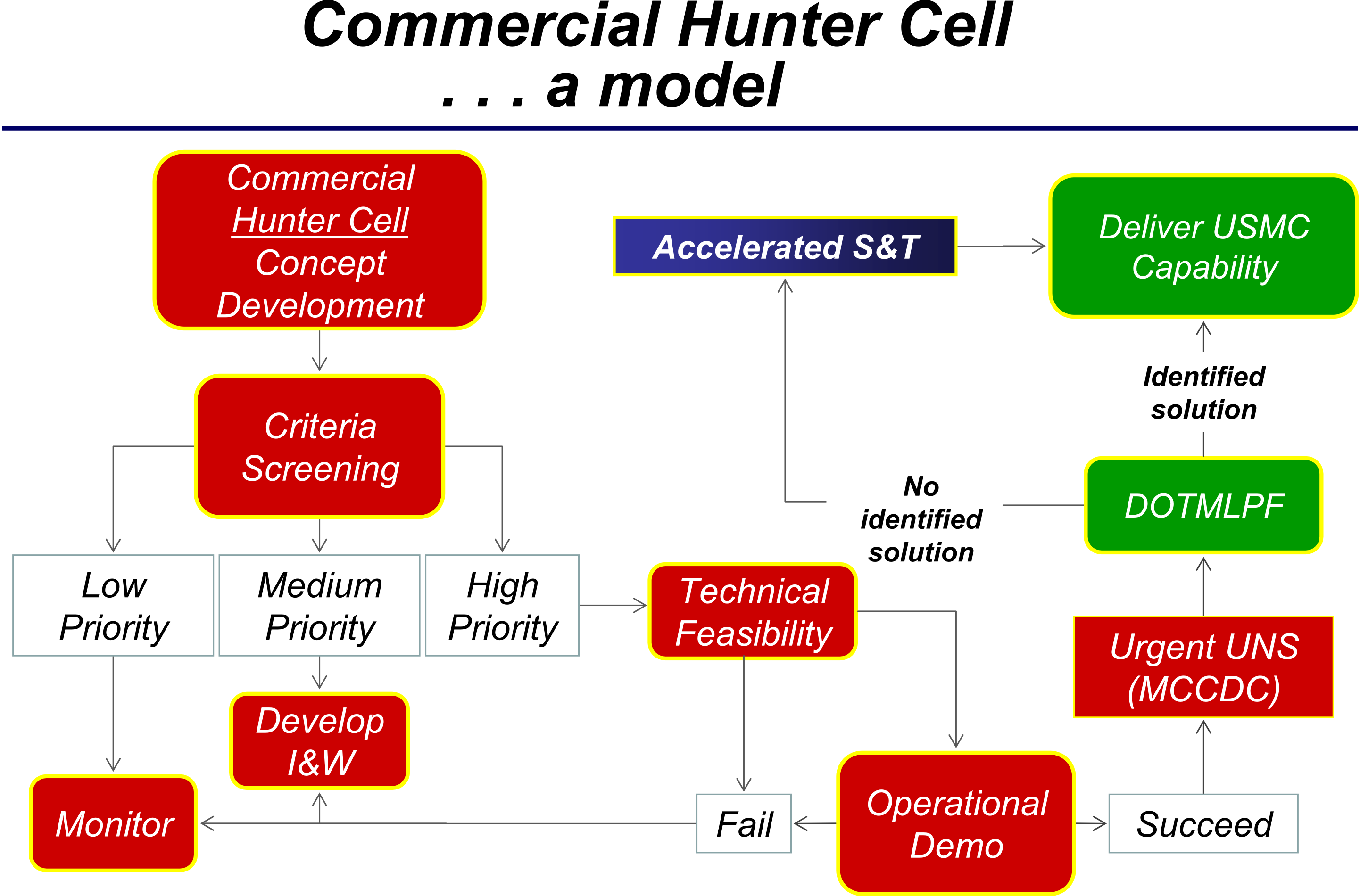
Commercial Hunter cell model

Exercise Commercial Hunter was a program run by the United States Marine Corps (USMC) Marine Corps Warfighting Laboratory. The program is designed to bring in creative unconventional outsiders to anticipate new threats. The program was formed following a recommendation from Naval Research Advisory Committee (NRAC) that the Marine Corps form a "Commercial Hunter" cell whose mission is: "to explore and anticipate the uses of readily available commercial technologies by irregular adversaries to attack key USMC capabilities or vulnerabilities" following a 2008 Naval Research Advisory Committee Study which found that the Marine Corps has no effective methods for anticipating unconventional threats which could be developed using imaginative combinations of commercial products acquired via the Web and distributed by the global supply network.

The creative leadership of Commercial Hunter should have the right "Rolodex," authorities, and traits (appropriate charisma, a renegade spirit, and the demonstrated ability to guide eclectic groups effectively) to identify and recruit the talent necessary to staff the Red Cells. Red Cell participants are envisaged as young creative outsiders representing a diverse, multidisciplinary group—engineering, social science, finance, computer, international development, entertainment, new media, etc.—who would be able to interact as needed with uniformed operators and the prototyping team. They should include a strong counter-cultural tone. Commercial Hunter would look for technologically proficient renegades and china-breakers. Such individuals are unlikely to be motivated by money, but rather by a belief that participation in the group is a badge of honor (because they are among an elite set of peers) and because they have been offered an unusual opportunity to use their distinctive talents in the Nation's service.

— Disruptive Commercial Technologies-2008 Naval Research Advisory Committee Study

The term commercial hunter is also used to describe its participants who "hunt" using commercially available goods. Unlike a "Combat Hunter" who uses professional big-game hunters, trackers, and cops on the beat to modify tactics against irregular forces, the "Commercial Hunter" would use outside experts to anticipate, identify, and defeat commercial technology threats. The Commercial Hunter program would anticipate threats via opposing force exercises using teams of smart, young, web-savvy people, from diverse backgrounds. These "commercial hunters" would identify and prioritize threats, buy from the internet creating a prototype to prove technical feasibility, and provoke action.

== Cancellation ==
A part of the exercise was allegedly canceled due to an online blog post in Danger Room by WIRED magazine.

== Funding ==
- The Georgia Tech Information Security Center received a US$10,811 (equivalent to $16,224 in 2025) grant for Information Exploitation: Commercial Hunter.

== Bibliography ==
- DuBois, Charlie (11 July 2008). "IST Students Earn a 'Job Well Done' in USMC Exercise". The Pennsylvania State University. Archived from the original on 15 July 2010.
- "Penn State Live – Improvised explosive devices target of student study". The Pennsylvania State University. 1 December 2008. Archived from the original on 5 December 2008.
- "Commercial hunter rfq" (PDF). Wired News. Archived from the original (PDF) on 24 January 2011.
