= William C. Martel =

American political scientist

- Born: July 15, 1955; Hartford, Connecticut, U.S.
- Died: January 12, 2015 (aged 59); Bedford, New Hampshire, U.S.
- Education: B.A. from St. Anselm College, Ph.D. in Political Science from University of Massachusetts Amherst, Post-doctoral fellow at Harvard University
- Occupation: Scholar
- Years active: 1983–2015
- Employer(s): International Security Studies Program, The Fletcher School of Law and Diplomacy, Tufts University
- Known for: Researcher of the leadership and policymaking processes in organizations, strategic planning, cyber and space, and technology innovation
- Notable work: Victory in War: Foundations of Modern Military Policy (2007); The Technological Arsenal: Emerging Defense Capabilities (editor & author) (2001)
- Title: Associate Professor of International Security Studies

William C. Martel (July 15, 1955 – January 12, 2015) was a scholar who specialized in studying the leadership and policymaking processes in organizations, strategic planning, cyberwarfare and militarisation of space, and technology innovation. He taught at the U.S. Air War College and U.S. Naval War College, and performed research for DARPA and the RAND Corporation. He later become Associate Professor of International Security Studies at the Fletcher School of Law and Diplomacy, a position he held until his death in 2015.

Martel served as an adviser to the National Security Council, to the U.S. Air Force, and to Governor Mitt Romney during his 2012 presidential campaign, as co-chair of Romney's Russia Working Group.

== Early life and education ==
Martel was born in Hartford, Connecticut, on July 15, 1955, a son of Dr. Cyprien Martel and Mrs. G. Eunice (Coughlin) Martel.

Martel pursued a B.A. from St. Anselm College, graduating in 1977, and a Ph.D. in Political Science from the University of Massachusetts Amherst. He later also became a post-doctoral fellow at Harvard University's Kennedy School of Government, from 1991–93.

== Career ==
Martel was the Director and Founder of the U.S. Air Force Center for Strategy and Technology from 1993–99, and Associate Professor of International Relations at the Air War College during the same years. From 1999–2005 he was Professor of National Security Affairs and Chair of Space Technology and Policy Studies at the Naval War College.

He served on the U.S. Air Force Scientific Advisory Board (2001–02) and was a Member of the Editorial Board of the Naval War College Review. He was also the principal investigator on space policy study with research support from MIT Lincoln Laboratory and the U.S. Defense Advanced Research Projects Agency. in 2005 he joined the faculty of Tufts University's Fletcher School of Law and Diplomacy, where he continued to teach until his death in 2015.

He also served as an adviser to the National Security Council, and as a foreign policy advisor in Mitt Romney's presidential campaign in 2011–12, as a specialist for Russian affairs.

Martel died of cancer on January 12, 2015, at the age of 59.

=== Awards ===
In 2014, Martel was the recipient of the Fletcher School’s James L. Paddock Award for excellence in teaching.

== Views ==
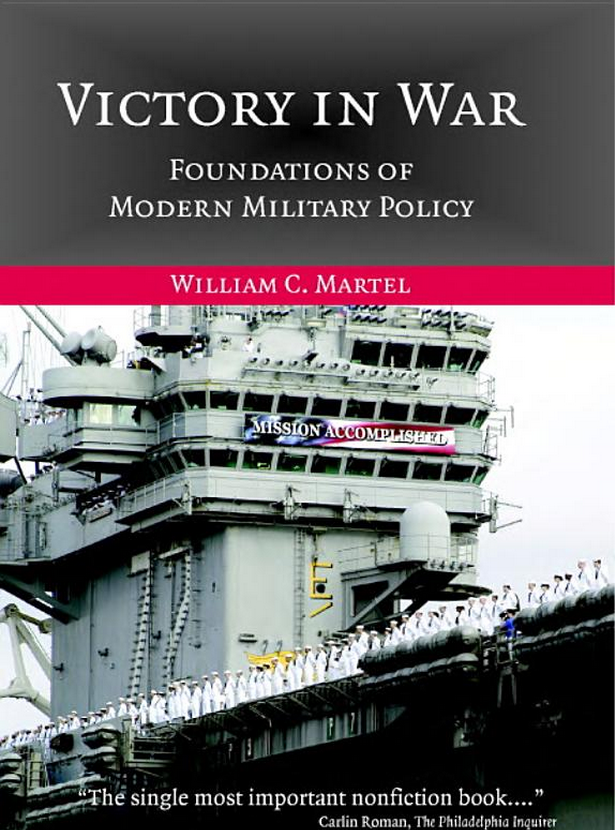
Cover of Victory in War, 2011 edition.

Commenting on the entrepreneurs who were selling protective equipment in the wake of the September 11 attacks, Martel said: "It is just people looking for security, in the face of systemic insecurity."

Speaking in 2006 about targeted killings as opposed to attempting to capture perpetrators, he said: "It's a pretty dicey proposition capturing somebody. You can't do a snatch and grab casually." In terms of domestic law, he said: "It is permissible to attack individuals who are heads of [either state or non-state] organizations in combat against the United States." Commenting in 2006 on the terrorist National Intelligence Estimates' declassified intelligence assessment on terrorism, Martel found it to be simplistic and not very useful. "I was stunned at how pedestrian it was," Martel said.

In 2008, he hailed Bush's announcement that he would cut the length of new tours in Iraq, saying: "In a war military, you have to cut corners to meet objectives. Progress comes in small doses." The Christian Science Monitor quoted Martel in 2008, saying of al-Qaeda's recruitment of Americans: "It's an immensely adaptive organization", while adding that it could potentially make it more open to penetration by western spies. "It could make it easier for us to understand what they're doing, and why," said Martel.

Speaking of Faisal Shahzad in 2010, he said: "This may suggest we are moving from the 'A' team in recruits to the 'B' team or even the 'C' team."

== Works ==
=== Books authored ===
- Grand Strategy in Theory and Practice: The Need for an Effective American Foreign Policy. (Cambridge University Press, 2014) ISBN 978-1107442214
- Victory in War: Foundations of Modern Military Policy (Cambridge University Press, 2007) ISBN 978-0521859561
  - (Revised and Expanded Edition in 2011)
- Russia's Democratic Moment: Defining U.S. Policy to Promote Democratic Opportunities in Russia (co-authored with Theodore C. Hailes) (Montgomery: Air War College Studies in National Security No. 2, 1995.) ISBN 978-0788146640
- Nuclear Coexistence: Rethinking U.S. Policy to Promote Stability in an Era of Proliferation (co-authored with William T. Pendley) (Montgomery: Air War College Studies in National Security No. 1, 1994.) ISBN 978-0788146633
- How To Stop A War: Research on Two Hundred Years of War and Peace (co-author) (NY: Doubleday, 1987.)
- Strategic Nuclear War: What the Superpowers Target and Why (co-authored with Paul L. Savage) (Westport, CT: Greenwood Press, 1986.) ISBN 978-0313241925

=== Books edited ===
- The Technological Arsenal: Emerging Defense Capabilities (editor & author) (Washington, DC: Smithsonian Institution Press, 2001) ISBN 9781560989615

=== Book chapters ===
- Reformulating Grand Strategy in the Indian Ocean Region: The Case for Containment, in Peter Dombrowski and Andrew C. Winner (editors), American Strategy in the Indian Ocean (Washington, DC: Georgetown University Press, 2014).
- Deterrence and Alternative Images of Nuclear Possession, in T. V. Paul, Richard J. Harknett, and James J. Wirtz (editors), The Absolute Weapon Revisited: Nuclear Arms and the Emerging International Order (Ann Arbor: The University of Michigan Press, 1998)
- Controlling Borders and Nuclear Exports, (chapter coauthored with Steven E. Miller) in Graham Allison, Ashton B. Carter, Steven E. Miller, Philip Zelikow, (eds.), Cooperative Denuclearization: From Pledges to Deeds (Cambridge: CSIA Studies in International Security, No. 2, Center for Science and International Affairs, Harvard University, 1993), pp. 198–220.
- Deterrence After the Cold War., in Stephen J. Cimbala, Sidney R. Waldman (editors), Controlling and Ending Conflict: Issues Before and After the Cold War (1992).
- Nuclear Strategy: What It Is and Is Not, in Charles Kegley and Eugene Wittkopf (editors), The Nuclear Reader: Strategy, Weapons, and War (New York: St. Martin's Press)
- Why Ukraine Gave Up Nuclear Weapons. in Pulling Back from the Nuclear Brink: Slowing, Stopping, Reversing, and Countering Nuclear Threats (1998).
- Non-Superpower Nuclear Crisis De-Escalation. in The De-escalation of Nuclear Crises (1992).
- Nuclear Strategy: What It Is and Is Not. The Nuclear Reader: Strategy, Weapons, and War (1989).
- Exchange Calculus of Nuclear War. in Strategic War Termination (1987).

=== Monographs ===
- Global Vigilance, Global reach, Global Power for America. (Washington, DC: Department of the United States Air Force, August 2013)
- Technology, Systems Architecture, and Policy. in Report on Availability and Survivability of Militarily Relevant Commercial Space Systems (March 2002)
- ‘‘Rethinking U.S. Proliferation Policy for the Future.’‘ Weapons of Mass Destruction: New Perspectives on Counterproliferation (1995).
- Improving the USAF Technology Transfer Process. (Santa Monica, CA: The Rand Corporation, 1991, Report No. R-4081-AF.)
- Review of Bases Abroad: The Global Foreign Military Presence. (Santa Monica, CA: The Rand Corporation, 1990, P-7649.)
- A Preliminary Perspective on Regulatory Activities and Effects in Weapons Acquisition. (Santa Monica, CA: The Rand Corporation, 1988, Report No. R-3578-ACQ.)

=== Articles ===
- American Grand Strategy after November 2012, Social Science and Modern Society, September 2012, Volume 49, Issue 5
- Victory in Scholarship in Strategy and War, Cambridge Review of International Affairs, Volume 24, Issue 3, 2011
- Grand Strategy of "Restrainment", Orbis, Vol. 54, No. 3, Summer 2010, pp. 356–73.
- Review of Space as a Strategic Asset, Journal of Strategic Studies (Spring 2009).
- Undeclared War and the Future of US Foreign Policy, Political Science Quarterly (2009)
- A Strategy for Victory and Implications for Policy, Orbis. Fall, 2008, Volume 52, No. 4, pp. 613–626
- Transparency is the Key to Avoiding Space Conflict, Arms Control Today (December 2008).
- Formulating Victory and Implications for Policy, Orbis (2008)
- Technologies That May Yet Revolutionize Warfare. Naval War College Review (Autumn 2006): 131–133.
- Review of Seapower and Space: From the Dawn of the Missile Age to Net-Centric Warfare. Naval War College Review (Winter 2004).
- Averting a Sino-U.S. Space Race. (authored with Toshi Yoshihara)The Washington Quarterly 26, no. 4 (2003): 19–35.
- Averting a Sino-U.S. Space Race, Washington Quarterly, Fall 2003
- Technology and Military Power, The Fletcher Forum of World Affairs, Fall 2001
- The End of Non-Proliferation? Strategic Review, Fall 2000
- Information Revolution and American Military Power, (co-author) Orbis (2000)
- The Risks of a Networked Military. Orbis (Winter 2000). (co-authored)
- Our Failure to Convert Russia's Arms Industry. Orbis (Summer 1999). (co-authored)
- Is Ukraine a Universal Example of Nonproliferation?. Defense Analysis (December 1998).
- Collective Insecurity: U.S. Defense Policy and the New World Disorder. American Political Science Review (September 1996): 691–692.
- Defense Conversion and Missing Markets. EDI Forum: A Review of Ideas and Experiences (1996).
- Controlling Borders and Nuclear Exports. Harvard University, CSIA Studies in International Security no. 2 (1993).
- Russia's Foreign Policy Bureaucracies and Uncontrolled Nuclear Proliferation. Northeastern University Political Review 1, no. 2 (Spring 1993).
- Bases Abroad: The Global Foreign Military Presence. Armed Forces & Society (Winter 1991): 305–307.
- A Framework and Approach to Foreign Policy. Strategic Air Defense (1989).
- America's Commitment to Europe in Decline? The End of Extended Deterrence, Deterrence Workshop Session Five: Nuclear Weapons and Extended Deterrence (1989), Santa Monica, CA: The RAND Corporation, Report No. WD-4422-AF.
- Nuclear Crisis Exercise at Harvard University. Nuclear War Education: Conference Proceedings (1988).
- Review of Nuclear Battlefields: Global Links in the Arms Race. Armed Forces & Society (Winter 1987): 308–309.
- The East German Army. World Armies: NATO and the Warsaw Pact (1983).
- The Soviet Army. World Armies: NATO and the Warsaw Pact (1983).
- A Historical Review of U.S. Participation in Military Exercises, 1959–1989. The Role of the Office of the Secretary of Defense in Major Command Post Exercises, Santa Monica, CA: The RAND Corporation, R-3973-USDP
- ‘‘Technologies and Techniques: Satellites.’‘ Encyclopedia of International Security Congressional Quarterly Press

=== Short essays ===
- America’s Grand Strategy Disaster, The National Interest, June 9, 2014
- On Syria: Don't Take Regime Change Off the Table The National Interest, September 9, 2013
- Seven Reasons Moscow Will Say "Nyet" to Nuke Cuts, RealClearDefense, June 27, 2013
- Strong Defense Begins at Home, RealClearDefense, June 12, 2013
- A Roadmap for American Grand Strategy, The Diplomat, March 4, 2013
- For America, Decline is a Choice, The Diplomat, March 15, 2013
- America’s Dangerous Drift, The Diplomat, February 25, 2013
- R.I.P. Containment, The Diplomat, September 24, 2012
- A Challenge for the West, Cognoscenti, WBUR
- Grand Strategy of the Authoritarian Axis: How Will the West Respond? The Diplomat, July 24, 2012
- An Authoritarian Axis Rising? The Diplomat, June 29, 2012
- Why America Needs a Grand Strategy, The Diplomat, June 18, 2012
- Can we win the war on terror?, The Providence Journal, March 18, 2010
- The West must face facts – Why U.S. can't live with a nuclear Iran, The Providence Journal, September 21, 2006

=== Select interview ===
- Martel: The Future of U.S. Space Policy, Interviewee: William Martel, Interviewer: Michael Moran, Council on Foreign Relations, December 5, 2006
