= Operation Urban Warrior =

American urban warfare exercise

Operation Urban Warrior was a United States Marine Corps program created as an exercise meant to plan and test Military Operations on Urbanized Terrain (MOUT) and urban warfare in general. It was developed in the mid-1990s by the Marine Corps Warfighting Laboratory partly in response to growing problems in inner-city fighting, and especially made urgent following the Battle of Mogadishu in 1993.

Press materials from the Warfighting Lab in 1997 stated, "..the world is becoming increasingly urbanized and increasingly dangerous" and described a new fight zone called the "urban littoral," or coastal zone where most of the world's population will reside. "Parts of the urban littoral will contain all the classic ingredients for conflict. There will be social, cultural, religious and tribal strife between different groups. Many areas will have scarce resources, including the most basic ones like food and shelter as populations grow and resources shrink even further. The chances for conflict will naturally grow with it".

Some preferred to call it the "Three Block War". The concern that Marines would be made responsible for humanitarian assistance, as evidenced by the Bosnian War, was part of the original planning of the program. According to a 1997 Defense Monitor brief, the Marines were facing the burden of excessive operational tempo related to humanitarian concerns. The importance of getting the military out of humanitarian relief was expressed in the 1997 Center for Defense Information brief.

== Background ==
Our enemies, having watched Desert Storm on CNN, know they cannot engage the United States with conventional methods. These potential foes view cities as a way to limit the technical advantages of our military. They know that cities, with their narrow streets, confusing layout and large number of civilian non-combatants, place limits on our technological superiority and especially our use of firepower. We have to develop technologies that allow us to win while minimizing collateral damage.

— Colonel Mark Thiffault, Director, Joint Information Bureau, Urban Warrior

The program has been called one of the most important in the United States Armed Forces. This is because, even though the U.S. is believed to have one of the most powerful conventional military forces in the world, a number of the more powerful weapons systems intended for use fighting in open places are useless in urban settings. This was the case in some forested regions of Europe, and in open deserts encountered during the Gulf War and Iraq War. Lines of approach through cities tend to be long and narrow, with sharp turns, civilians, street traffic and local commerce. This environment is one where heavy fighting vehicles like the M1 Abrams can not maneuver well, avoid being seen from a long distance by potential hostiles, nor be certain that all ground surfaces will support vehicle weight.

Inhabitants may have any of a huge number of possible reactions, including anger, resentment, disrespect, and a strong potential for spontaneous protest, disorder, and uninitiated response. Those who are friendly may be desperate for assistance but afraid, increasing the risk of stampedes and other problems. Those who are hostile will be on their home ground, have familiarity with the terrain, and decide to defend their home turf. Furthermore, those who use unconventional warfare will have found protection among inhabitants. To use options like airstrikes, artillery, and mortars against cities will have a high cost in missed targets and civilian casualties. History records multiple military operations involving cities, of which a large number degenerated into torturous situations with massive casualties. Stalingrad and Saigon are two modern examples.

As the world's population becomes concentrated in cities, current and future fighting will likely take place within them. This means there will be an increase in demand for infantrymen, because infantrymen are uniquely able to enter built-up areas, uproot and clear them, defend them, and even search local residences. This is one reason why United States military leaders' plans include the reasonable assumption that the infantryman's role in combat operations will increase rather than decrease in the coming years, such as the Land Warrior system.

Urban Warrior is seen as having one primary purpose: to fight enemies in urban environments, with a secondary purpose of conducting and refining disaster relief and humanitarian assistance for use in the United States and abroad. Doing so supposedly involves gaining the support and trust of the local population by engaging in humanitarian efforts, a project the Marine Corps has more recently sought to distance itself from.

Some lessons learned from Urban Warrior were applied in the 2003 invasion of Iraq and subsequent occupation. Fighting in Najaf and Fallujah has once again made it clear that local irregular forces tend to have the advantage of home territory and plentiful local support. Religion, ideology, and culture may also play in the local insurgent's favor. Non-combatants often side with them because of nationalism, ethnic connections, general dislike or even hatred of a foreign invading force. For example, this tendency became clear in Mogadishu, Somalia, when civilians chose to support the Habar Gidir (as opposed to United Nations and U.S. forces), and in Fallujah, where most of the remaining civilians decided the invasion forces were less favorable than the insurgent defenders.

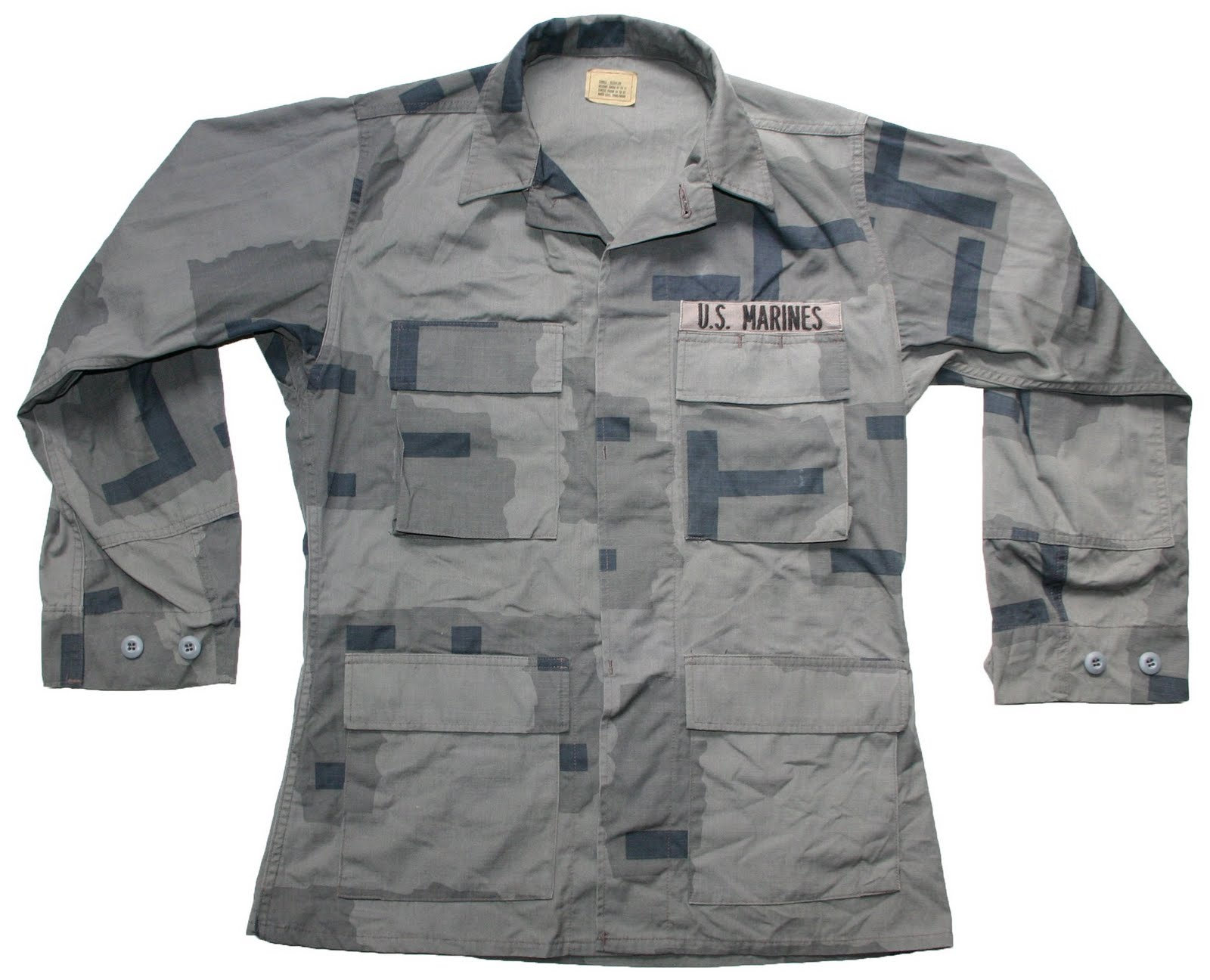
Experimental T-pattern BDU jacket

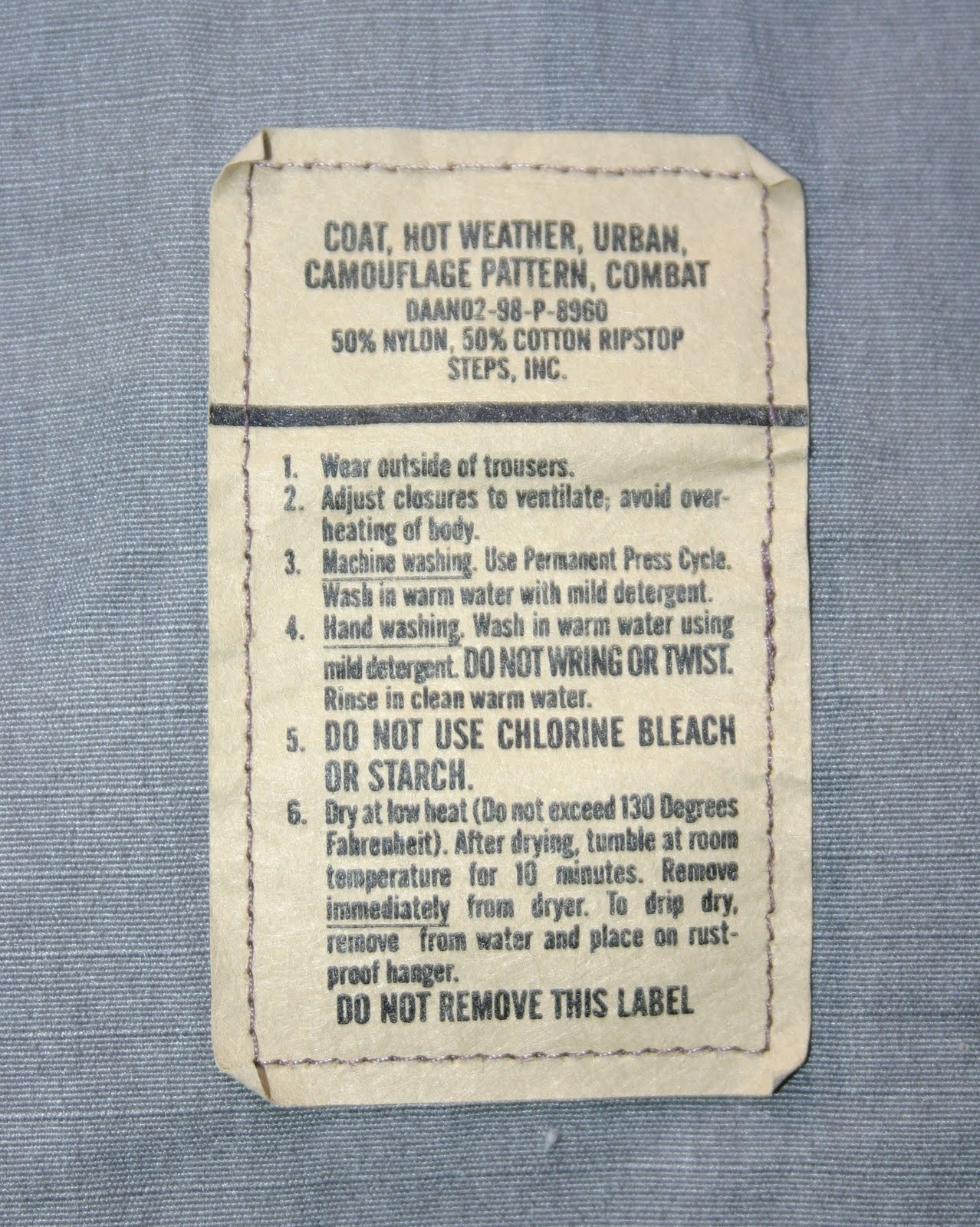
Label of experimental T-pattern BDU jacket

An experimental urban camouflage Battle Dress Uniform was developed and used during the Urban Warrior exercises of 1999. The pattern, sometimes called T-pattern or T-block, consists of medium gray, dark gray, and black arranged in a geometric pattern, intended as a 'pattern breaker' to make Marine troops harder to locate in such environments. Like all modern BDUs, it is made of a lightweight rip-stop material. The pattern was never officially adopted, and it has since been superseded by MARPAT.

== History ==
=== Exercises in Chicago, May 1998 ===
Eighty Marines from 1st Battalion, 8th Marines, stationed in Marine Corps Base Camp Lejeune, toured Chicago to enhance knowledge of urban infrastructure, such as a gas plant, water facility, tunnels, bridges, and police and Fire stations.

=== Exercises in the San Francisco East Bay, March 1999 ===
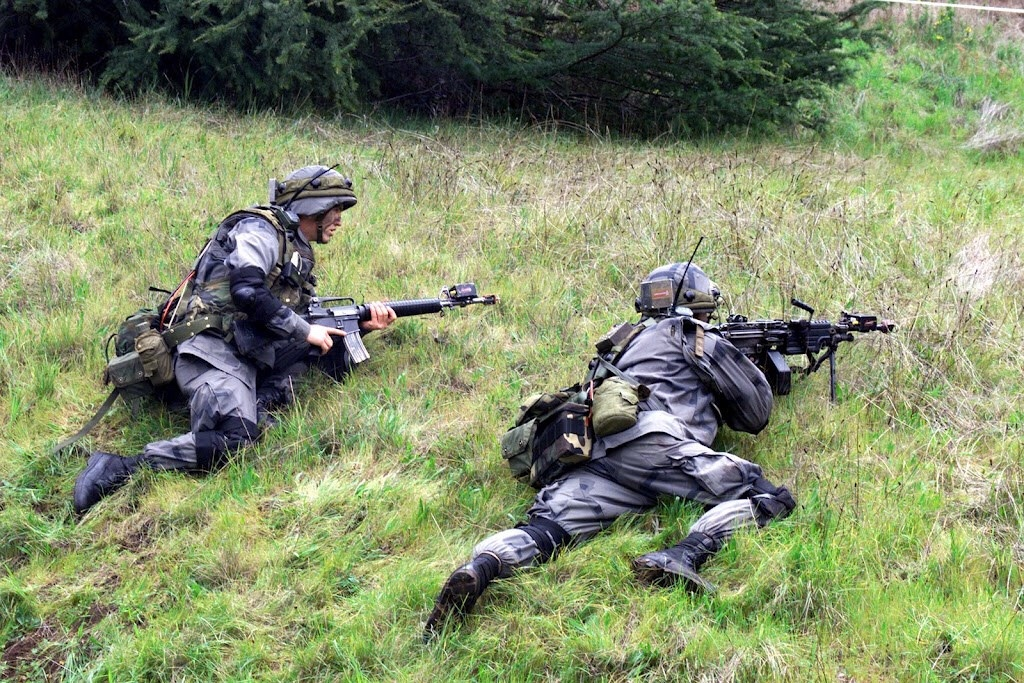
Marines with 1st Battalion, 5th Marines prone against a hill on 16 March 1999 at Naval Facility Oakknole, CA

A four-day military exercise was planned and executed in Oakland, California in March 1999. A combined force of 6,000 Marines and 700 sailors took control of the grounds and buildings of the defunct Oak Knoll Naval Hospital and invaded the defunct Naval Air Station Alameda on the second day as part of a national effort called Operation Sea Dragon.

After original plans to use the San Francisco Presidio were rejected by the National Park Service based on the size of the spectacle and its inherent environmental damage, and a trial run at the Naval Postgraduate School beach in Monterey, California, Oakland Mayor Jerry Brown and Alameda Mayor Ralph Appezzato welcomed the Marines to use their cities as a proving ground. The operations included multiple aviation assets, such as AV-8B Harrier IIs, CH-46 Sea Knights, CH-53 Sea Stallions, AH-1 SuperCobras, and UH-1N Twin Hueys, as well as several Landing Craft Air Cushion. Five Navy ships, including USS Hornet (CV-12) and USS Bonhomme Richard (LHD-6), were brought in and opened for public viewing during the operations.

== See also ==
- Jade Helm
- Low-intensity conflict
- Counter-insurgency
- Divide and rule
- Irregular warfare
- Urban warfare
- Fourth generation warfare
- Military operations other than war
- Hearts and Minds (Vietnam War)
- Hearts and minds (Iraq)
