= United States Marine Corps Warfighting Laboratory =

U.S. Marine Corps battle lab

Marine Corps Warfighting Laboratory/Futures Directorate
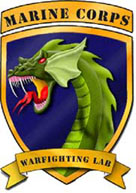
- MCWL Insignia
- Active: 1995
- Country: United States
- Branch: USMC
- Type: Concepts and Experimentation
- Role: Generates and examines threat-informed, operating concepts and capabilities and provides analytically supported recommendations to inform subsequent force design and development activities.
- Part of: Office of the Deputy Commandant, Combat Development and Integration
- Garrison/HQ: Marine Corps Base Quantico

Commanders
- Current commander: Brigadier General Simon M Doran

The United States Marine Corps Warfighting Laboratory (MCWL) was established in 1995, at Marine Corps Base Quantico, Virginia. The organization was originally known as the Commandant's Warfighting Laboratory. The battle lab is part of Combat Development and Integration—under Headquarters, United States Marine Corps—and its stated purpose is to improve current and future naval expeditionary warfare capabilities across the spectrum of conflict for current and future operating forces.

The organization is in charge of various aspects of advanced techniques and technology in the United States Marine Corps, and is also responsible for overseeing the Urban Warrior program.

== See also ==
- United States Army Research, Development and Engineering Command (RDECOM)
- United States Army Research Laboratory (ARL)
- Office of Naval Research (ONR)
- Naval Research Laboratory (NRL)
- Air Force Research Laboratory (AFRL)·
- DARPA
- Asymmetric warfare
- Commercial Hunter
- CQC
- Distributed operations
- Low-intensity operations
- Urban Warrior
