= Annual dry season offensive =

Annual dry season offensive is a type of low intensity warfare typically practiced by national governments against ethnic insurgent groups fighting for independence or autonomy. This type of warfare usually occurs in countries with poor transportation infrastructure and a climate that makes fighting battles or even holding territory during parts of the year very difficult.

The governments of Myanmar and Sudan have engaged in annual dry season offensives in the 21st century. Cambodia and Vietnam have engaged in such offensives during their war against Cambodian insurgent groups in the past. North Vietnam historically engaged in such offensives during a proxy war between irregular groups in Laos during the Vietnam War.

== Mechanism ==
Such an offensive is carried out by focusing troop movement and supply to the dry season. Government forces usually move out of well-established base areas into insurgent territory where they attempt to take and hold as much territory as possible while inflicting as many casualties as possible on the insurgent army. The army will also typically inflict as much material damage as possible in areas supporting the insurgency. The offensive also typically extends to collective punishments of the civilian population of the country. At the end of the offensive, the army gives back all of the territory taken and returns to its base areas until the next dry season.

The strategy behind annual dry season offensives is to slowly wear down an insurgency or to at least contain it. It can also prevent insurgent groups from gaining de facto independence from the government. The strategy has never on its own defeated an insurgent movement, but it can pressure insurgent groups into political negotiations. It is often used against groups that demand independence from a government and have a large base of local ethnic support.
