= Roy Godson =

Academic at Georgetown University

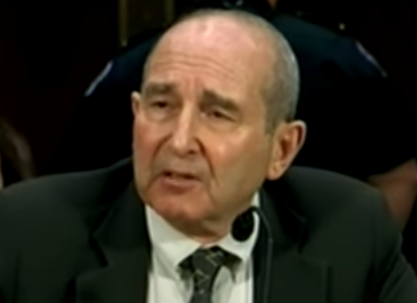
- Roy Godson
- Occupation: Professor emeritus of government at Georgetown University
- Notable work: Dezinformatsia: Active Measures in Soviet Strategy

Roy Godson (born 1942) is an academic and scholar within the fields of international politics and national security, and a professor emeritus at Georgetown University.

== Education ==
Godson graduated with a PhD from Columbia University, with a focus on international politics and national security.

== Career ==
He is a Georgetown University emeritus professor of government.

Godson testified before the United States House of Representatives, United States House Committee on Foreign Affairs, as an expert on violence in Central America. He testified before the United States Senate Select Committee on Intelligence in 2017, to give background on the Senate investigation into Russian interference in the 2016 United States elections.

He has served as president of the National Strategy Information Center, Washington, D.C.

Godson has authored and edited multiple books on covert operations and intelligence, including: Dezinformatsia: Active Measures in Soviet Strategy, Dirty Tricks or Trump Cards, and Comparing Foreign Intelligence.

== Books ==
- Dezinformatsia: Active Measures in Soviet Strategy, with Richard H. Shultz.
- Intelligence Requirements for the 1980s: Analysis and Estimates,
- Dirty Tricks or Trump Cards: U.S. Counterintelligence and Covert Action,
