= James Korris =

American game designer

- Education: Yale University; Harvard Business School
- Occupation: Game designer
- Known for: Full Spectrum Warrior; The Killing Yard

James H. Korris is an American game designer. His work is known in game-based simulation for military training. He served as Creative Director of the Institute for Creative Technologies (Institute), University of Southern California (USC) in Los Angeles from its founding in August 1999 until October 2006. He is the lifetime member of Writers Guild of America.

== Education ==
Korris earned his undergraduate degree in economics at Yale University and was awarded an MBA with distinction at the Harvard Business School.

== Career ==
At the institute, Korris worked with talents as diverse as John Milius, Randal Kleiser and David Ayer The initial $44.5 million contract grew substantially as basic research in immersive virtual reality and prototype application development was expanded.

Dubbed "The Military Entertainment Complex", the modern collaboration of Hollywood and the Department of Defense at the institute was first discussed in a National Research Council study published in 1997.

At USC, Korris led projects including Full Spectrum Warrior, the first military application developed for Microsoft's Xbox, along with desktop training simulations Full Spectrum Command, Full Spectrum Leader, the Joint Fires and Effects Trainer System and the Department of Defense 2006 Modeling & Simulation Award-winner Every Soldier a Sensor Simulation.

Korris also led USC Institute work in Concept Development and Visualization, a process that brought Hollywood story-telling and production techniques to military informational films. Work included the award-winning video Nowhere To Hide, the US Army/Defense Advanced Research Projects Agency vision of America's future, transformed land force. His team supported the US Army's Future Combat Systems critical Block B review which resulted in approval of the $14.7 billion System Development & Design phase of the program.

Korris' work at USC was recognized in the 2006 Smithsonian Institution-Cooper Hewitt Design Life Now 2006 National Design Triennial. He was a featured speaker at Richard Saul Wurman's 2006 Entertainment Gathering, eg2006. Korris was also designated a Massive Change Visionary in Bruce Mau's Massive Change exhibit in October 2004.

In 2007, Korris was appointed to the Naval Research Advisory Committee, the senior scientific advisory group to the Secretary of the Navy, the Chief of Naval Operations, Commandant of the Marine Corps, and the Chief of Naval Research. In 2008, he was named to lead a US Marine Corps study on virtual simulation training for ground forces.

In October 2006, Korris launched Creative Technologies Incorporated (CTI) as a direct outgrowth of his work at USC. CTI efforts include a large-format, mobile simulation project for the Future Combat Systems program and concept development and content production for The Boeing Company's Space Segment Design Review for Transformational SATCOM.

Korris came to USC following work in Hollywood studio production, producing and writing. He began with several creative executive positions at Universal Television, moving on to serve as a staff producer for Ron Howard and Brian Grazer's Imagine Films.

Friends Rick Berman and Maurice Hurley (Co-Executive Producer) named character Captain Korris after him in the episode Heart of Glory. He executive produced Showtime/Paramount's "The Killing Yard" which won the 2003 American Bar Association Silver Gavel. He is a member of the writers' branch of the Academy of Television Arts and Sciences, the Writers Guild of America, the Writers Guild of Canada and the Society of Motion Picture and Television Engineers.

== Selected publications ==
- Making Information Entertaining & Entertainment Informative, The Entertainment Gathering 1/2/3/ Feb 2006 Program Book (Wired 2006)
- Organizational Simulation "Application of Immersive Technology For Next Generation Simulation" (with Richard Lindheim) (John Wiley & Sons, 2005)
- Every Soldier A Sensor Simulation: The Ninety Day Wonder – How the Army's Institute for Creative Technologies Developed an Award-Winning Training Application for the Global War on Terrorism in Record Time, 25th Army Science Conference (2006), (with Julia C. Campbell and LTC Raymond Compton)
- Learning To Win: How the Military (& You) Can Build Leaders Through Gaming, ELearning! Magazine October 2006 (cover story)
- How ICT Built A Cognitive Training Tool for the Xbox 24th Army Science Conference 2004
- JFETS: Using Immersive Technology to Train the "Universal Observer" – 24th Army Science Conference 2004 (with Randall Hill and David Hendrie)
