= Distributed operations =

Distributed Operations (DO) is a war-fighting concept drafted by the United States Marine Corps and developed primarily by their Warfighting Laboratory as a response to the changing environment of the Global War on Terror. Adaptive enemies and a more complex environment were seen as requiring conventional forces to maintain the ability to decentralize decision making and distribute their forces. The overarching goal of DO is to maximize a Marine Air Ground Task Force commander's ability to employ tactical units across the depth and breadth of a non-linear battlespace.

Distributed Operations is a form of maneuver warfare where small, highly capable units spread across a large area of operations will create an advantage over an adversary through the deliberate use of separation and coordinated, independent tactical actions. DO units will use close combat or supporting arms to disrupt the enemy's access to key terrain and avenues of approach. Positioning numerous smaller ships over a vast geographic area and swiftly aggregate them, would better support counterinsurgency operations allowing a fast response to threats while maintaining the ability to overmatch adversaries through a well-integrated and enabled network with highly precise and coordinated fires. A February 2021 Marine Corps tentative manual on Expeditionary Advanced Base Operations (EABO) states that Littoral manoeuvre will rely heavily on surface platforms such as the light amphibious warship (LAW) and a range of surface connectors, as well as aviation assets. The LAW is envisioned as the principal littoral maneuver vessel of the littoral force. A November 9, 2020, press report stated that, as part of its LAW industry studies, the Navy had received nine LAW concept designs from 16 design firms and shipyards, some of which have paired into teams. The report quoted a Navy official as stating that the following firms were participating in the industry studies: Austal USA, BMT Designers, Bollinger Shipyards, Crescere Marine Engineering, Damen, Hyak Marine, Independent Maritime Assessment Associates, Nichols Brothers Boat Builders, Sea Transport, Serco, St. John Shipbuilding, Swiftships, Technology Associates Inc., Thoma-Sea, VT Halter Marine and Fincantieri. Light Amphibious Warships (LAWs) would be instrumental to these operations, with LAWs embarking, transporting, landing, and subsequently reembarking these small Marine Corps units. This type of warfare will be dependent on well trained and professional small unit leaders, focused and energetic training of small units and more robust communications and tactical mobility assets for those smaller units. A greater focus will also be placed on language and cultural training.

DO has two deployment modes; disburse and coalesce. In the disbursal mode distributed units spread out to find targets, gather intel, and secure lightly defended infrastructure. In Coalesce mode units coalesce to concentrate all of their firepower on large, heavily defended targets of opportunity, high value targets, perhaps with the aid of air and sea-based bombardment. The general model is that of an immune system. When a pathogen is located, the antibody attacks the pathogen, but not before messaging the body to send more resources to finish attack.

== Historical examples ==
- Finnish small unit tactics during the Winter War of 1939–1940.
- British and Indian "Chindit" tactics employed against the Japanese during the Burma Campaign.
- The U.S. Marines Combined Action Program during the Vietnam War.
