= Low-intensity conflict =

Military conflict below the intensity of conventional war

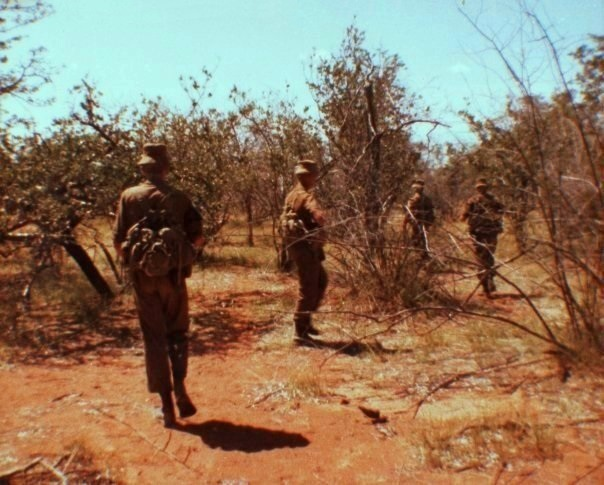
South African paratroops conduct a search and destroy operation against insurgents in Namibia during the 1980s; like many low-intensity conflicts, the South African Border War primarily took the form of small unit engagements and unconventional warfare.

A low-intensity conflict (LIC) is a military conflict, usually localised, between two or more state or non-state groups which is below the intensity of conventional war. It involves the state's use of military forces applied selectively and with restraint to enforce compliance with its policies or objectives.

The term can be used to describe conflicts where at least one or both of the opposing parties operate along such lines.

== Official definitions ==
=== United States ===
Low-intensity conflict is defined by the United States Army as:

... a political-military confrontation between contending states or groups below conventional war and above the routine, peaceful competition among states. It frequently involves protracted struggles of competing principles and ideologies. Low-intensity conflict ranges from subversion to the use of the armed forces. It is waged by a combination of means, employing political, economic, informational, and military instruments. Low-intensity conflicts are often localized, generally in the Third World, but contain regional and global security implications.

The manual also says:

... successful LIC operations, consistent with US interests and laws, can advance US international goals such as the growth of freedom, democratic institutions, and free market economies. ... US policy recognizes that indirect, rather than direct, applications of US military power are the most appropriate and cost-effective ways to achieve national goals in a LIC environment. The principal US military instrument in LIC is security assistance in the form of training, equipment, services and combat support. When LIC threatens friends and allies, the aim of security assistance is to ensure that their military institutions can provide security for their citizens and government. ... The United States will also employ combat operations in exceptional circumstances when it cannot protect its national interests by other means. When a US response is called for, it must be in accordance with the principles of international and domestic law. These principles affirm the inherent right of states to use force in individual or collective self-defense against armed attack.

=== Relations with terrorism ===
Boaz Ganor notes that scholars once labeled terrorism as "low-intensity warfare." However, this terminology has become obsolete due to the intricate nature of multidimensional warfare and the mass impact of contemporary terrorist attacks, such as the September 11 attacks.

== Implementation ==
=== Weapons ===
As the name suggests, in comparison with conventional operations the armed forces involved operate at a greatly reduced tempo, with fewer soldiers, a reduced range of tactical equipment and limited scope to operate in a military manner. For example, the use of air power, pivotal in modern warfare, is often relegated to transport and surveillance, or used only by the dominant side of conflict in asymmetric warfare such as a government forces against insurgents. Artillery and multiple rocket launchers are often not used when LIC occurs in populated areas. The role of the armed forces is dependent on the stage of the insurrection, whether it has progressed to armed struggle or is in an early stage of propaganda and protests. Improvised explosive devices are commonly used by insurgents, militias and sometimes government forces such as barrel bombs in low intensity conflicts. The majority of casualties in low intensity conflicts tend to be resulting from small arms and improvised explosive devices.

=== Intelligence ===
Intelligence gathering is essential to an efficient basis of LIC operation instructions. Electronic and signal gathering intelligence, ELINT and SIGINT, proves largely ineffective against low-intensity opponents. LIC generally requires more hands-on HUMINT methods of information retrieval.

=== Stages ===
In the first stages of insurrection, much of an army's work is "soft" – working in conjunction with civil authorities in psychological operations, propaganda, counter-organizing, so-called "hearts and minds." If the conflict progresses, possibly into armed clashes, the role develops with the addition of the identification and removal of the armed groups – but again, at a low level, in communities rather than throughout entire cities.

The stages of LIC include the following:

Emerging - formation of conflict between countries or groups within the countries.

Planning - determining tactical approach, goals, and strategy resolving the dispute. This stage can include the psychological operations, propaganda and further "soft work" mentioned above.

Expansion - involvement of other countries or international organizations through alliances, treaties or institutions.

Confrontation - escalating tension between the sides, preparing to resolve the conflict using all available means.

Military conflict - Usage of military force by one or both sides, either demonstratively or on a limited scale, to compel the other side to meet ones demands.

Conflict resolution - the conflict moves towards a settlement or resolution of the underlying disputes.

== Examples ==
=== Burma ===
Myanmar (Burma) has regularly conducted limited low-intensity military campaigns against the independence movement of the Karen people in an area of southeast Burma (roughly corresponding to a Burmese administrative region called the Kayin State), which has actively pursued independence since January 1949. While allegedly limited and low-intensity in that the territories occupied in force by central government forces are returned (as they cannot be held permanently as yet) at the end of the offensives (with the stated, but sometimes unstated, purpose of weakening the opposition and independence movements), human rights organizations and national governments outside of Burma question the veracity of, and sometimes outright refute, these claims.

=== Sudan ===
The governments of Sudan have also engaged in limited military offensives (analogous to Burma's "annual dry season offensives") against various armed opposition and independence movements, which have often escalated into full-scale warfare, particularly in the south and Darfur, but also until recently in the east. These military actions (First Sudanese Civil War and Second Sudanese Civil War) have, over time, continued to ravage the areas in dispute and contribute greatly to the poor conditions in those regions as well as the various human rights violations that have occurred (and in some cases are still occurring) there.

=== German occupation of France ===
German occupation of Western Europe during World War II, notably the occupation of France, shared many aspects with more recent cases of LIC, such as the "Hearts and minds" stage early on, establishment of puppet governments, strong propaganda aimed at isolating resistance movements, and support to domestic friendly forces (such as the Milice in France).

=== German occupation of Poland ===
In Poland from 1939 to 1945 there was a strong partisan movement. Partisan forces (mainly AK and BCh organizations), although less numerous than the German army, organized a strong resistance movement; in the years 1941-44 a successful action was carried out against the expulsion of Poles from the Zamość region. Besides, the "Polish underground" destroyed hundreds of German transports of military supplies throughout the war. In Poland there was also a secret order and many non-military resistance organizations like "Zegota" which helped thousands of Jews save their lives. When the Red Army entered Poland in 1944, the Poles wanted to support them in the fight against the Germans, but the Soviets betrayed them, even though during Operation Tempest, the partisans significantly accelerated the Russian attack, the Russians arrested or killed thousands of members of the Polish Underground State, nor did the Soviets also help support the Warsaw Uprising. In total, throughout the war, hundreds of thousands of people (up to 700,000) served in the ranks of the Polish underground, and even every sixth Pole helped polish partizants but partizantes did not have more than 50,000 firearms.

=== Northern Ireland ===
The conflict, known as The Troubles, was a sectarian and ethno-nationalistic conflict, fuelled by historical events and longstanding oppression by the UK's military and security services. By the mid-1960s, the Northern Ireland civil rights movement began organizing Irish Catholics to protest, among other factors, disenfranchisement, abuses of power such as discrimination in the housing and job markets perpetuated by the ruling governments in the United Kingdom and its devolved subsidiary, known as Stormont. When these peaceful protests were met with brutal attacks by both the police and loyalist gangs given free rein to attack these protesters. On its face, it had a religious dimension although despite use of the terms 'Protestant' and 'Catholic' to refer to the two warring sides, it was not a religious conflict. For most, these were mostly just terms of identity. A key issue was the status of Northern Ireland. Unionists and loyalists, who descended from colonists who arrived during the Ulster Plantation, displacing all but a handful of native clans and farmers, were Ulster Protestants and wanted Northern Ireland to remain within the United Kingdom. Irish nationalists and republicans, who were mostly Irish Catholics, wanted to end the Partition of Ireland, leave the United Kingdom and reunite with the 26 counties that had formed the Republic of Ireland following partition.

The main participants in the Troubles were republican paramilitaries such as the Provisional Irish Republican Army (IRA) and the Irish National Liberation Army (INLA); loyalist paramilitaries such as the Ulster Volunteer Force (UVF) and Ulster Defence Association (UDA); British state security forces such as the British Army, Royal Ulster Constabulary (RUC), Ulster Defense Regiment, MI5, and lesser known groups like the Force Research Unit; and political activists. The security forces of the Republic of Ireland played a smaller role. Republicans carried out a guerrilla campaign against British forces as well as a bombing campaign against infrastructural, commercial and political targets. Loyalists attacked occasionally republicans/nationalists, but focused primarily on the wider Catholic community in what they described as retaliation. At times, there were bouts of sectarian tit-for-tat violence, as well as feuds within and between paramilitary groups. The British security forces undertook policing and counter-insurgency, primarily against suspected republicans. This included the internment without trial of anyone accused of being, or supporting, Republicans. Investigations also revealed significant collusion between British state forces and loyalist paramilitaries, and furthermore loyalist paramilitaries such as the Glenanne gang included serving members of the Ulster Defense Regiment and Royal Ulster Constabulary.

== Guerrilla warfare ==
Low-intensity warfare's main opponent is the guerrilla, or irregular fighter. This opponent may be state sponsored, or private non-state actors driven by religious or other ideology in urban, semi-urban and rural areas. Modern guerrilla warfare at its fullest elaboration is an integrated process, complete with sophisticated doctrine, organization, specialist skills and propaganda capabilities. Guerrillas can operate as small, scattered bands of raiders, but they can also work side by side with regular forces or combine for far-ranging mobile operations in squad, platoon or battalion sizes or even form conventional units. Based on their level of sophistication and organization, they can shift between all those modes as the situation demands, as guerrilla warfare is flexible, not static.

Guerrilla tactics are based on intelligence, ambush, deception, sabotage, and espionage, undermining an authority by long, low-intensity confrontation. It can be quite successful against an unpopular foreign or local regime, as demonstrated by the Vietnam War. A guerrilla army may increase the cost of maintaining an occupation or a colonial presence above what the foreign power may wish to bear. Against a local regime, guerrillas may make governance impossible by terror strikes and sabotage or even a combination of forces to depose their local enemies in conventional battle. Those tactics are useful in demoralizing an enemy and raising the morale of the guerrillas. In many cases, guerrilla tactics allow a small force to hold off a much larger and better equipped enemy for a long time, as in Russia's Second Chechen War and the Second Seminole War fought in the swamps of Florida, United States. Guerrilla tactics and strategy are summarized below and are discussed extensively in standard reference works such as Mao's On Guerrilla Warfare.

=== Three-phase Maoist model ===
==== Mao/Giap approach ====
Mao's theory of people's war divides warfare into three phases. In the first phase, the guerrillas gain the support of the population by attacking the machinery of government and distributing propaganda. In the second phase, escalating attacks are made on the government's military and vital institutions. In the third phase, conventional fighting is used to seize cities, overthrow the government, and take control of the country. Mao's seminal work On Guerrilla Warfare, has been widely distributed and applied, nowhere more successfully than in Vietnam, under the military leader and theorist Võ Nguyên Giáp. Giap's People's War, People's Army closely followed the Maoist three-stage approach but with greater emphasis on flexible shifting between mobile and guerrilla warfare, and opportunities for a spontaneous "general uprising" of the masses, in conjunction with guerrilla forces.

=== Organization ===
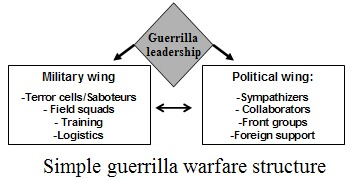

Organizational structure of pro-Socialist Republic of Viet Nam entities, produced by the United States during the Vietnam War

Guerrilla organization can range from small local rebel groups with a few dozen participants to tens of thousands of fighters, deploying from tiny cells to formations of regimental strength. In most cases, there is a leadership aiming for a clear political objective. The organization is typically structured into political and military wings, sometimes allowing the political leadership plausible deniability of military attacks. The most fully elaborated guerrilla warfare structure was seen by the Chinese and Vietnamese communists during the revolutionary wars of East and Southeast Asia.

A simplified example of this more sophisticated organizational type, which was used by revolutionary forces during the Vietnam War, is shown below.

=== Types of operations ===
Guerrilla operations typically include a variety of attacks on transportation routes, individual groups of police or military, installations and structures, economic enterprises, and targeted civilians. Attacking in small groups and using camouflage and often captured weapons of that enemy, the guerrilla force can constantly keep pressure on its foes and diminish its numbers and still allow escape with relatively few casualties. The intention of such attacks is only military but also political in aiming to demoralize target populations or governments or by goading an overreaction that forces the population to take sides for or against the guerrillas. Examples range from chopping off limbs in various internal African rebellions to the suicide bombings of Palestine and Sri Lanka to sophisticated maneuvers by Viet Cong and NVA forces against military bases and formations.

=== Surprise and intelligence ===
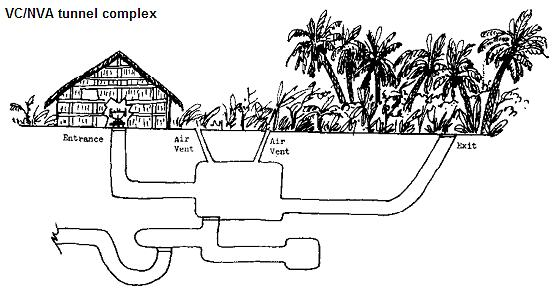
One of the ingenious tunnel complexes in Vietnam used by low-intensity fighters for storage, shelter, withdrawal, and defence.

For successful operations, surprise must be achieved by guerrillas. If the operation has been betrayed or compromised, it is usually called off immediately. Intelligence is also extremely important, and detailed knowledge of the target's dispositions, weaponry, and morale is gathered before any attack. Intelligence can be harvested in several ways. Collaborators and sympathizers usually provide a steady flow of useful information. If working clandestinely, guerrilla operatives may disguise their membership in the insurgent operation and use deception to ferret out needed data. Employment or enrollment as a student may be undertaken near the target zone, community organizations may be infiltrated, and even romantic relationships struck up in intelligence gathering. Public sources of information are also invaluable to the guerrilla, from the flight schedules of targeted airlines, to public announcements of visiting foreign dignitaries, to US Army Field Manuals. Modern computer access via the World Wide Web makes harvesting and collation of such data relatively easy. The use of on the spot reconnaissance is integral to operational planning. Operatives will "case" or analyze a location or potential target in depth- cataloging routes of entry and exit, building structures, the location of phones and communication lines, the presence of security personnel, and a myriad of other factors. Finally, intelligence is concerned with political factors such as the occurrence of an election or the impact of the potential operation on civilian and enemy morale.

=== Relationships with the civil population ===
Relationships with civil populations are influenced by whether the guerrillas operate among a hostile or friendly population. A friendly population is of immense importance to guerrillas, providing shelter, supplies, financing, intelligence, and recruits. The "base of the people" is thus the key lifeline of the guerrilla movement. In the early stages of the Vietnam War, American officials "discovered that several thousand supposedly government-controlled 'fortified hamlets' were in fact controlled by Viet Cong guerrillas, who 'often used them for supply and rest havens.'" Popular mass support in a confined local area or country, however, is not always strictly necessary. Guerrilla and revolutionary groups can still operate by using the protection of a friendly regime, drawing supplies, weapons, intelligence, local security, and diplomatic cover. The Al Qaeda organization is an example of the latter type, drawing sympathizers and support primarily from the wide-ranging Muslim world, even after American attacks eliminated the umbrella of a friendly Taliban regime in Afghanistan.

An apathetic or hostile population makes life difficult for guerrillas, and strenuous attempts are usually made to gain their support. They may involve not only persuasion but also a calculated policy of intimidation. Guerrilla forces may characterize a variety of operations as a liberation struggle, but that may or may not result in sufficient support from affected civilians. Other factors, including ethnic and religious hatreds, can make a simple national liberation claim untenable. Whatever the exact mix of persuasion or coercion used by guerrillas, relationships with civil populations are one of the most important factors in their success or failure.

=== Use of terror ===
Terror is used to focus international attention on the guerrilla cause, liquidate opposition leaders, extort cash from targets, intimidate the general population, create economic losses, and keep followers and potential defectors in line. The widespread use of terror by guerrillas and their opponents is a common feature of modern guerrilla conflicts, with civilians attempting to mollify both sides. At times, a civil population may be the main targets of guerrilla attacks, as in Palestinian operations against Israeli civilians. Such tactics may backfire and cause the civil population to withdraw its support or to back countervailing forces against the guerrillas.

=== Withdrawal ===
Guerrillas must plan carefully for withdrawal once an operation has been completed or if it is going badly. The withdrawal phase is sometimes regarded as the most important part of a planned action, as getting entangled in a lengthy struggle with superior forces is usually fatal to insurgent, terrorist or revolutionary operatives. Withdrawal is usually accomplished using a variety of different routes and methods and may include quickly the scouring of the area for loose weapons, the cleaning-up of evidence, and the disguising as peaceful civilians. In the case of suicide operations, withdrawal considerations by successful attackers are moot, but such activity as eliminating traces of evidence and hiding materials and supplies must still be done.

=== Logistics ===
Guerrillas typically operate with a smaller logistical footprint than to conventional formations, but their logistical activities can be elaborately organized. A primary consideration is to avoid depending on fixed bases and depots, which are comparatively easy for conventional units to locate and destroy. Mobility and speed are the keys; wherever possible, the guerrilla must live off the land or draw support from the civil population in which it is embedded. In that sense, "the people" become the guerrilla's supply base. The financing of terrorist or guerrilla activities ranges from direct individual contributions (voluntary or non-voluntary) to the actual operation of business enterprises by insurgent operatives to bank robberies and kidnappings to the complex financial networks that are based on kin, ethnic and religious affiliation used by modern jihadist/jihad organizations.

Permanent and semi-permanent bases form part of the guerrilla logistical structure, which are usually located in remote areas or in cross-border sanctuaries that are sheltered by friendly regimes. They can be quite elaborate, such as in the tough VC/NVA fortified base camps and tunnel complexes encountered by US forces during the Vietnam War. Their importance can be seen by the hard fighting sometimes engaged in by communist forces to protect those sites. However, when it became clear that defense was untenable, communist units typically withdrew without sentiment.

=== Terrain ===
Guerrilla warfare is often associated with a rural setting, which was indeed the case with the definitive operations of Mao and Giap, and the mujahideen of Afghanistan. Guerrillas, however, have successfully operated in urban settings, such as in Argentina and Cyprus. In both cases, guerrillas rely on a friendly population to provide supplies and intelligence. Rural guerrillas prefer to operate in regions providing plenty of cover and concealment, especially heavily forested and mountainous areas. Urban guerrillas, rather than melting into the mountains and forests, blend into the population and also depend on a support base among the people. Rooting guerrillas out of both types of areas can be difficult.

=== Foreign support and sanctuaries ===
Foreign support in the form of soldiers, weapons, sanctuary, or statements of sympathy for guerrillas is not strictly necessary, but it can greatly increase the chances of an insurgent victory. Foreign diplomatic support may bring the guerrilla cause to international attention, putting pressure on local opponents to make concessions or garnering sympathetic support and material assistance. Foreign sanctuaries can add heavily to guerrilla chances, furnishing weapons, supplies, materials, and training bases. Such shelter can benefit from international law, particularly if the sponsoring regime is successful in concealing its support and in claiming plausible deniability for attacks that are by operatives based in its territory.

The VC and NVA made extensive use of such international sanctuaries during their conflict, and the complex of trails, way-stations and bases snaking through Laos and Cambodia (the famous Ho Chi Minh Trail) was the logistical lifeline that sustained their forces in South Vietnam. Another case in point is the Mukti Bahini guerrillas, who fought alongside the Indian Army in the 14-day Bangladesh Liberation War in 1971 against Pakistan, which led to the independence of Bangladesh. In the post-Vietnam era, al-Qaeda also made effective use of remote territories, such as Afghanistan under the Taliban regime, to plan and execute its operations. That foreign sanctuary eventually broke down with American attacks against the Taliban and al-Qaeda after the September 11 attacks.

=== Guerrilla initiative and combat intensity ===
Since they can choose when and where to strike, guerrillas usually have the tactical initiative and the element of surprise. The planning for an operation may take weeks, months, or even years with a constant series of cancelations and restarts, as the situation changes. Careful rehearsals and "dry runs" are usually conducted to work out problems and details. Many guerrilla strikes are not undertaken unless clear numerical superiority can be achieved in the target area, a pattern typical of VC/NVA and other "people's war" operations. Individual suicide bomb attacks offer another pattern, typically involving only the individual bomber and his support team, but they too are spread or metered out based on prevailing capabilities and political winds.

Whatever approach is used, the guerrilla holds the initiative and can prolong his survival by varying the intensity of combat. Attacks are spread out over quite a range of time, from weeks to years. During the interim periods, the guerrilla can rebuild, resupply, and plan. During the Vietnam War, most communist units, including mobile NVA regulars using guerrilla tactics, spent only a few days per month fighting. While they might be forced into an unwanted battle by an enemy sweep, most of the time was spent in training, intelligence gathering, political and civic infiltration, propaganda indoctrination, construction of fortifications, or foraging for supplies and food. The large numbers of such groups striking at different times, however, gave the war its "around-the-clock" quality.

== Low-intensity counter operations or counter-guerrilla warfare ==
Quick air support, by helicopters and fixed-wing assets, is integral to countering low-intensity threats.

=== Principles ===
The low-intensity fighter or guerrilla can be difficult to beat, but certain principles of counter-insurgency warfare are well known since the 1950s and 1960s and have been successfully applied.

==== Classic guidelines ====
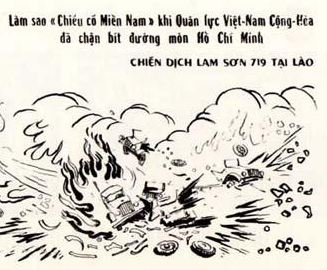
Propaganda leaflets are often used in low-intensity operations to demoralize opponents; these U.S. leaflets were dropped on the Ho Chi Minh Trail by U.S. forces during the Vietnam War.

The widely distributed and influential work of Sir Robert Thompson, counter-insurgency expert in Malaysia, offers several such guidelines. Thompson's underlying assumption is that of a country minimally committed to the rule of law and better governance. Numerous other regimes, however, give such considerations short shrift, and their counterguerrilla operations have involved mass murder, genocide, starvation as well as the massive spread of terror, torture and execution. The totalitarian regimes of Stalin and Hitler are classic examples, as are the lesser but comparable measures of dictatorships fighting "dirty wars" in South America. Elements of Thompson's moderate approach are adapted here:

1. A viable competing vision that comprehensively mobilizes popular support. There must be a clear political counter-vision, which can overshadow, match, or neutralize the guerrilla vision. That can range from granting political autonomy to economic development measures in the affected region. The vision must be integrated approach, involving political, social, and economic and media influence measures.
2. Reasonable concessions where necessary. Action also must be taken at a lower level to resolve legitimate grievances. It may be tempting for the counter-insurgent side simply to declare guerrillas "terrorists" and to pursue a harsh liquidation strategy. Brute force, however, may not be successful in the long run. Action does not mean capitulation, but sincere steps, such as removing corrupt or arbitrary officials, cleaning up fraud, or collecting taxes honestly can do much to undermine the guerrillas' appeal.
3. Economy of force. The counter-insurgent regime must not overreact to guerrilla provocations, which may indeed be what the guerrilla seeks to create a crisis in the civilian morale. Police level actions should guide the effort and take place in a clear framework of legality, even if under a state of emergency. Civil liberties and other customs of peacetime may have to be suspended, but again, the counter-insurgent regime must exercise restraint and cleave to orderly procedures. Clear steps must be taken to curb brutality and retaliation by the security or "freelance" forces.
4. Big unit action may sometimes be necessary. If police action is not sufficient to stop insurgents, military sweeps may be necessary. Such "big battalion" operations may be needed to break up significant guerrilla concentrations and split them into small groups that can be controlled by combined civic-military action.
5. Mobility. Mobility and aggressive small unit action is extremely important for the counter-insurgent regime. Heavy formations must be lightened to aggressively locate, pursue, and fix insurgent units. Huddling in static strongpoints simply concedes the field to the insurgents, who must be kept on the run constantly by aggressive patrols, raids, ambushes, sweeps, cordons, etc.
6. Systematic intelligence effort. Every effort must be made to gather and organize useful intelligence. A systematic process must be set up to do so, ranging from casual questioning of civilians to structured interrogations of prisoners. Creative measures must also be used, including the use of double agents or even bogus "liberation" or sympathizer groups to help reveal insurgent personnel or operations.
7. Methodical clear and hold. An "ink spot" clear and hold strategy must be used by the counter-insurgent regime, which divides the conflict area into sectors and assigns priorities between them. Control must expand outward like an ink spot on paper, systematically neutralizing and eliminating the insurgents in one sector of the grid, before proceeding to the next. It may be necessary to pursue holding or defensive actions elsewhere while priority areas are cleared and held.
8. Careful deployment of mass popular forces and special units. Specialist units can be used profitably, including commando squads, long range reconnaissance, "hunter-killer" patrols, defectors who can track or persuade their former colleagues like the Kit Carson units in Vietnam, and paramilitary style groups. Strict control must be kept over specialist units to prevent the emergence of violent vigilante-style reprisal squads that undermine the government's program. Mass forces include village self-defence groups and citizen militias organized for local defence and security.
9. Foreign assistance must be limited and carefully used. Such aid should be limited to material and technical support and small cadres of specialists. Unless that is done, the foreign helper may find itself "taking over" the local war and being sucked into a lengthy commitment, thus providing the guerrillas with valuable propaganda opportunities. Such a scenario occurred with the United States in Vietnam.

== Low-intensity operations ==
Low-intensity operations consist of the deployment and use of soldiers in situations other than war. For states, these operations are usually conducted against non-state actors and are given terms like counter-insurgency, anti-subversion, and peacekeeping. Violent non-state actors often conduct low-intensity operations against states, often in insurgencies.

== See also ==
- Counterinsurgency
- Divide and rule
- Fourth-generation warfare
- Guerrilla warfare
- Grey-zone (international relations)
- Irregular warfare
- Military operations other than war
- New Wars
- Political warfare
- Reagan Doctrine
- Violent non-state actor
