= How Tyrants Fall =

2024 book by Marcel Dirsus

How Tyrants Fall: And How Nations Survive
- Author: Marcel Dirsus
- Language: English
- Subject: Political science
- Publisher: John Murray
- Publication date: 2024
- Publication place: United Kingdom
- Media type: Print
- Pages: 304 pp.
- ISBN: 978-1399809481

How Tyrants Fall: And How Nations Survive is a 2024 non-fiction book written by Marcel Dirsus and published by John Murray. The book examines historical strategies for overthrowing dictators and their effectiveness in the modern era, particularly in the context of contemporary mass surveillance technologies.

The book has been recognized as one of the "Books of the Year" by The Economist. It has been translated into ten languages.

== Summary ==
The book draws on historical evidence to explore the downfall of dictators. To inform his writing, the author consulted with a diverse range of experts, including diplomats, journalists, regime opponents, ex-spies, and nuclear experts. The author notes that every dictator has vulnerabilities, asserting that "even if the price is heavy, there is room for hope. These people can be brought down, and sometimes it happens in an instant."

Dirsus cites research showing that since World War II, 23% of national rulers lost power through exile or imprisonment, with the figure rising to 69% for dictators, who were often exiled, imprisoned, or killed. He characterizes dictatorships as inherently unstable, susceptible to collapse from even seemingly minor events. The author demonstrates that non-violent campaigns are almost ten times more likely to result in democratic outcomes than violent uprisings, with 57% of successful non-violent movements leading to democracy, compared to less than 6% for violent ones. It also suggests that autocrats who embrace democratic reforms tend to have safer and more peaceful post-leadership lives. Furthermore, it notes that party-based autocratic systems are generally more stable than regimes centered around individual leaders.

The book discusses the Romanian revolution of 1989 as an example of how dictators often misjudge their power. On December 21, 1989, Nicolae Ceaușescu's speech to a crowd in Bucharest turned into a disaster, with the audience heckling him in response to the regime's brutal suppression of protests. Fearing for their safety, the Ceaușescus attempted to flee by helicopter but were soon informed that the military had turned against them. Their subsequent capture led to a quick trial and execution. Dirsus notes Ceaușescu's overconfidence, writing that he failed to prepare for the possibility of his downfall, making his escape impossible once the situation turned against him.

Drawing on Erica Chenoweth's "3.5% rule", the author asserts that mass protests involving just 3.5% of the population can be enough to topple a regime. According to this rule, "no revolution has failed once 3.5% of the population mobilized at the peak of resistance, whether through mass protests or other forms of non-cooperation." The author argues that while regimes like North Korea are skilled at preventing mass protests, diminishing their effectiveness, such movements can succeed with toppling regimes such as the Islamic Republic of Iran. In addressing such movements, he advises against violent suppression, writing that "if you shoot, you lose," as escalating violence tends to fuel further cycles of resistance and repression.

The book highlights that overthrowing well-established tyrannies such as North Korea and Iran can be challenging. Dirsus demonstrates that such changes typically occur through internal conflicts or the defection of key allies, citing historical examples such as the overthrow of Ferdinand Marcos in 1986 and Francisco Macias Nguema in 1979.

The book's actionable recommendations for removing tyrants are presented in its concluding section. The author proposes a strategy centered on weakening the leader, strengthening the elites, and empowering the masses. He suggests specific actions such as halting weapons shipments that dictators might use against their citizens, imposing economic sanctions to limit their ability to reward allies, and disrupting access to surveillance software to hinder the tracking of opponents. The book also critiques Western complicity in enabling despots to acquire significant assets in democratic economies, citing examples like Qatar Holdings LLC's stake in Volkswagen.

== Reception ==
The book has been recognized as one of the "Books of the Year" by The Economist. The Daily Telegraph described it as "thought-provoking" and "entertaining". The Financial Times called it a "compelling book".

As of October 2024, the book has been translated into ten languages.

== See also ==
- Coup d'État: A Practical Handbook
