= Rethinking Violence =

2010 book edited by Adria Lawrence and Erica Chenoweth

Rethinking Violence: States and Non-State Actors in Conflict
- Editors: Adria Lawrence and Erica Chenoweth
- Series: BCSIA Studies in International Security Series
- Subject: Political conflict
- Published: 2010
- Publisher: MIT Press
- Pages: 304 pp.
- ISBN: 9780262514286

Rethinking Violence: States and Non-State Actors in Conflict is a collection of essays about violence and political conflicts, edited by Adria Lawrence and Erica Chenoweth. It has been reviewed in Perspectives on Politics, International Studies Review, Journal of Peace Research, Terrorism and Political Violence, Global Crime, Choice and the Air Force Research Institute.

The other contributors are Kristin M. Bakke, Emily Beaulieu, H. Zeynep Bulutgil, Kathryn McNabb Cochran, Kathleen Gallagher Cunningham, Alexander B. Downes, Erin K. Jenne, Harris Mylonas, Wendy Pearlman and Maria J. Stephan.
