= Adria Lawrence =

American political scientist

Adria K. Lawrence
- Citizenship: American
- Education: University of Chicago (PhD), Vassar College (AB)
- Scientific career
- Fields: International relations
- Workplaces: Johns Hopkins University

Adria K. Lawrence is an American political scientist and the Aronson Associate Professor of International Studies and Political Science at Johns Hopkins University. She is known for her expertise on colonialism, nationalism, conflict, collective action, and Middle Eastern and North African politics.

Her book, Imperial Rule and the Politics of Nationalism, won the 2015 J. David Greenstone Book Prize, the 2015 L. Carl Brown Book Prize, and the 2014 Jervis-Schroeder Best Book Award.

== Books ==
- Imperial Rule and the Politics of Nationalism: Anti-Colonial Protest in the French Empire, Cambridge University Press, 2013, ISBN 9781107640757
- Rethinking Violence: States and Non-State Actors in Conflict (Co-edited with Erica Chenoweth), BCSIA Studies in International Security Series, MIT Press, 2010, ISBN 9780262514286
