= Power Play (1978 film) =

- Directed by: Martyn Burke
- Written by: Edward N. Luttwak; Martyn Burke
- Produced by: Bob Cooper (IV); Ronald I. Cohen; Christopher Dalton
- Starring: Peter O'Toole; David Hemmings; Donald Pleasence
- Cinematography: Ousama Rawi
- Edited by: John Victor-Smith
- Music by: Ken Thorne
- Distributed by: Rank Film Distributors
- Release date: 1978
- Running time: 102 minutes
- Countries: United Kingdom; Canada
- Language: English

Power Play (also known as Coup d'Etat, A State of Shock and Operation Overthrow) is a 1978 British-Canadian political thriller film directed by Martyn Burke and starring Peter O'Toole and David Hemmings. It was written by Burke and Edward N. Luttwak based on the latter's 1968 non-fiction strategy book Coup d'État: A Practical Handbook.

== Plot ==
A small group of military officers frustrated by the corruption and brutality of a fictional contemporary European government decide that they must overthrow the current administration. But the coup's leader worries that there is a spy in their group.

Colonel Narriman, an idealistic and soon-to-retire army officer, becomes sickened by the government's use of extrajudicial killing and torture to suppress the terrorist insurgency that their incompetence and corruption has fostered. Jean Rousseau persuades him that, instead of retiring, he should attempt to overthrow the regime for the good of the country.

Worried about infiltration by agents of the hated internal security chief Blair, he emphasises operational security, as he knows he can expect no mercy if caught, while he builds the coup one important recruit at a time. A key such person is Colonel Zeller, whose armoured brigade is seen as vital for capturing the capital city quickly.

The final part of the film is the actual conduct of the coup attempt with twists and surprises.

== Cast ==
- Peter O'Toole as Colonel Zeller
- David Hemmings as Colonel Narriman
- Donald Pleasence as Blair
- Barry Morse as Jean Rousseau
- George Touliatos as Barrientos
- Harvey Atkin as Anwar
- August Schellenberg as Minh
- Chuck Shamata as Hillsman
- Alberta Watson as Donna

== Production ==
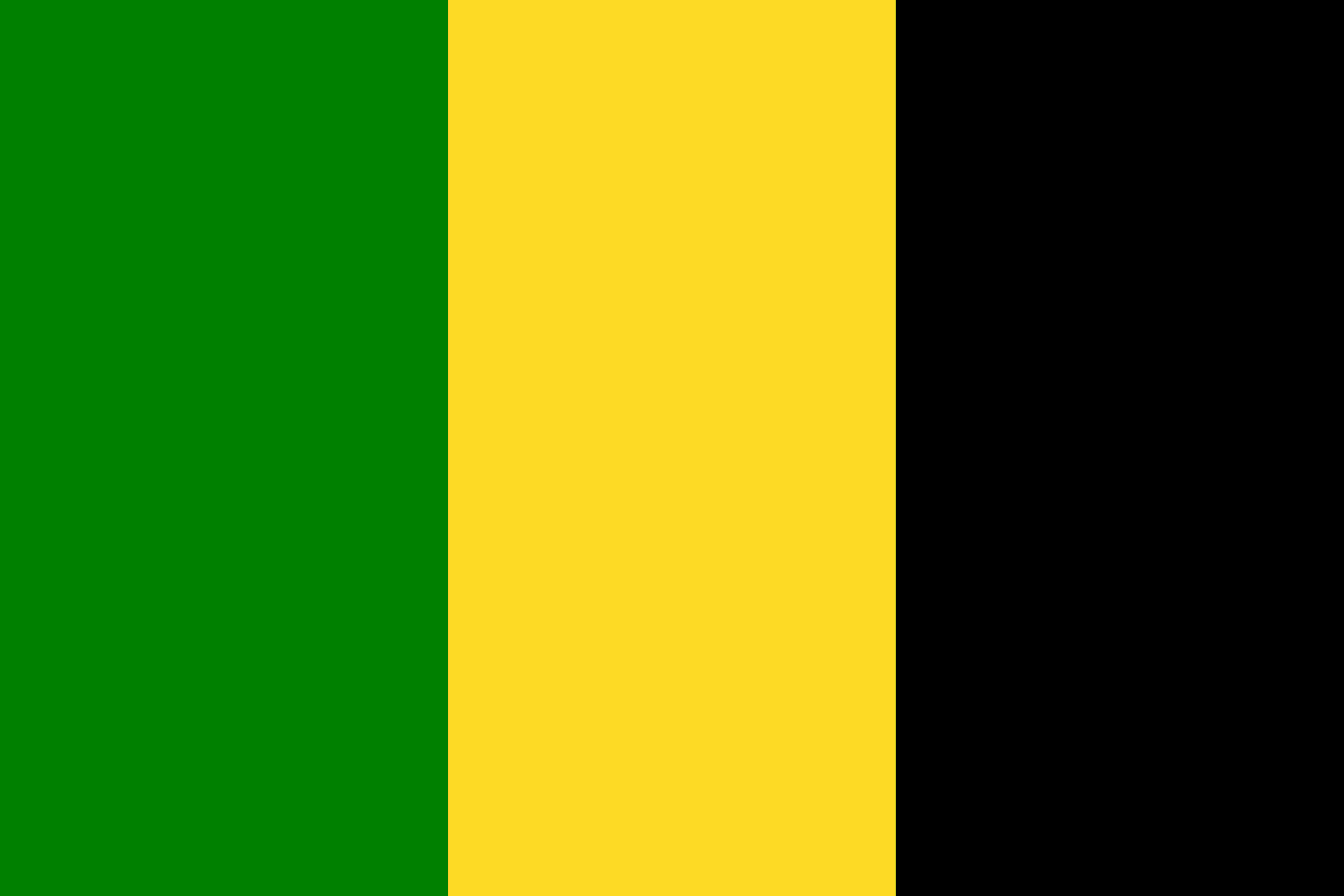
Flag of the unnamed republic where the coup d‘ etat is taking place

The UK-Canada co-production was filmed in Canada and West Germany. It was one of a series of Canadian films partly financed with some money from the Rank Organisation.

Power Play includes scenes shot at the University of Toronto's University College quadrangle and hallways. Portions were also filmed at CFB Borden, CFB Toronto and CFB Lahr in West Germany, using elements of the 4 Canadian Mechanized Brigade Group. The Canadian Armed Forces also provided aircraft, armoured fighting vehicles (including Centurion tanks), and soldiers for the filming. The different marks of Centurion tanks reflected the fact that filming occurred both in Canada and in West Germany.

The flag of the film's unnamed republic, "a generic country with no specific geography or culture", was green, yellow and black.

It was one of the first films financed under Canadian tax concessions.

== Reception ==
The Monthly Film Bulletin wrote: "Set in a kind of latter-day sub-Ruritania populated exclusively by soldiers, politicians and (briefly) terrorists, Martyn Burke's banana-republic view of modern power politics is fashionably cynical but predictably tendentious and banal, not helped by tired casting ... and an irrelevant overfondness for bellicose production values. As in other recent military adventure films, such as the Entebbe trio and The Wild Geese, there is a disquieting tendency to romanticise the armed forces and to promote them as the proper guardians of democracy (as if they were free from the corruption endemic in politics and big business)."

Variety wrote: "The appeal of "Power Play" is presumably to the action crowd. ... Intellectually, if that counts, the occasionally incoherent story line of the conspiracy will leave many minds puzzled. The screenplay shows signs of much re-editing and its character motivation clutter is of television flavor."

== Accolades ==
The film won the Best Screenplay award at the Canadian Film Awards.

== Home media ==
It was released on DVD in 2005 by New Star Video under the title A State of Shock.
