= Coup d'état =

Deposition of a government

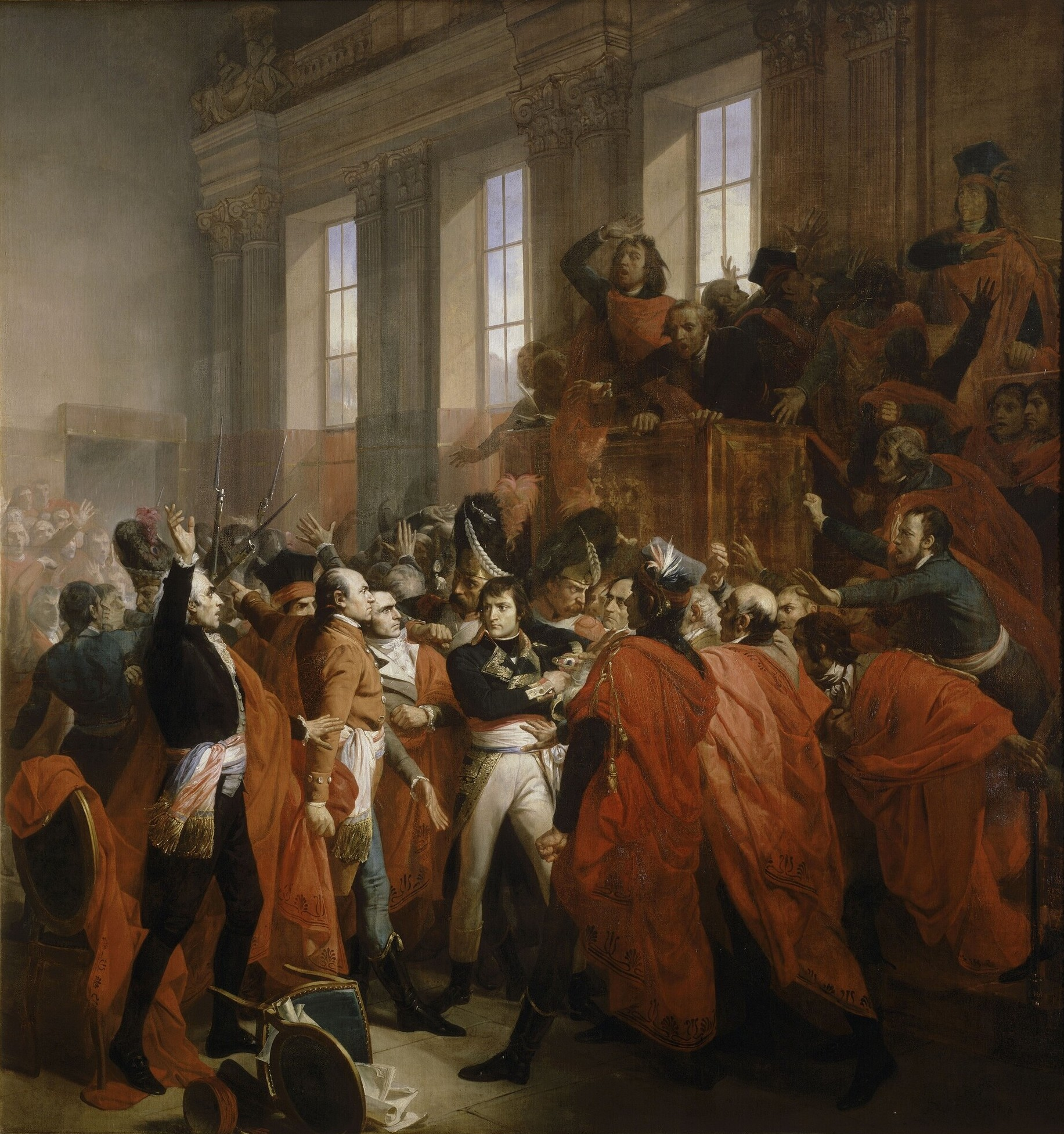
General Napoleon Bonaparte during the Coup of 18 Brumaire in Saint-Cloud, detail of painting by François Bouchot, 1840

A coup d'état (/ˌkuːdeɪˈtɑː/; French: [ku deta]; lit. 'stroke of state'), or simply a coup, is typically an illegal and overt attempt by a military organization or other government elites to unseat an incumbent person or leadership. A self-coup is said to take place when a leader, having come to power through legal means, tries to stay in power through illegal means.

By one estimate, there were 457 coup attempts from 1950 to 2010, half of which were successful. Most coup attempts occurred in the mid-1960s, but there were also large numbers of coup attempts in the mid-1970s and the early 1990s. Coups occurring in the post-Cold War period have been more likely to result in democratic systems than Cold War coups, though coups still mostly perpetuate authoritarianism.

Many factors may lead to the occurrence of a coup, as well as determine the success or failure of a coup. Once a coup is underway, coup success is driven by coup-makers' ability to get others to believe that the coup attempt will be successful. The number of successful coups has decreased over time. Failed coups in authoritarian systems are likely to strengthen the power of the authoritarian ruler. The cumulative number of coups is a strong predictor of future coups, a phenomenon referred to as the "coup trap". (Note: Multiples sources:)

In what is referred to as "coup-proofing", regimes create structures that make it hard for any small group to seize power. These coup-proofing strategies may include the strategic placing of family, ethnic, and religious groups in the military and the fragmenting of military and security agencies. However, coup-proofing reduces military effectiveness as loyalty is prioritized over experience when filling key positions within the military. (Note: see:)

== Etymology ==
The term comes from French coup d'État, literally meaning a 'stroke of state' or 'blow of state'. In French, the word État (French: [eta]) is capitalized when it denotes a sovereign political entity.

One early use within text translated from French was in 1785 in a printed translation of a letter from a French merchant, commenting on an arbitrary decree, or arrêt, issued by the French king restricting the import of British wool.

In the British press, the phrase came to be used to describe the various murders by Napoleon's alleged secret police, the Gens d'Armes d'Elite, who executed the Duke of Enghien: "the actors in torture, the distributors of the poisoning draughts, and the secret executioners of those unfortunate individuals or families, whom Bonaparte's measures of safety require to remove. In what revolutionary tyrants call grand[s] coups d'état, as butchering, or poisoning, or drowning, en masse, they are exclusively employed."

== Related terms ==
=== Self-coup ===
A self-coup, also called an autocoup (from Spanish autogolpe) or coup from the top, is a form of coup d'état in which a political leader uses illegal means to stay in office or to vastly increase their power. The leader may dissolve or render powerless the national legislature and unlawfully assume extraordinary powers. Other measures may include annulling the constitution, suspending civil courts, and having the head of government assume dictatorial powers.

From 1946 to the beginning of 2021, an estimated 148 self-coup attempts took place, 110 in autocracies and 38 in democracies.

=== Soft coup ===
A soft coup, sometimes referred to as a silent coup or a bloodless coup, is an illegal overthrow of a government that – unlike a regular coup d'état – is achieved without the use of force or violence.

=== Palace coup ===
A palace coup or palace revolution is a coup in which one faction within the ruling group displaces another faction within a ruling group. Along with popular protests, palace coups are a major threat to dictators. The Harem conspiracy of the 12th century BC was one of the earliest attempts. Palace coups were common in Imperial China. They have also occurred among the Habsburg dynasty in Austria, the Al-Thani dynasty in Qatar, and in Haiti in the 19th to early 20th centuries. The majority of Russian tsars between 1725 and 1801 were either overthrown or usurped power in palace coups.

=== Putsch ===
The term putsch ([pʊtʃ], from Swiss German for 'knock') denotes the political-military actions of a minority reactionary coup. The term was initially coined for the Züriputsch of 6 September 1839 in Switzerland. It was also used for attempted coups in Weimar Germany, such as the 1920 Kapp Putsch, Küstrin Putsch, and Adolf Hitler's 1923 Beer Hall Putsch.

The 1934 Night of the Long Knives was Hitler's purge to eliminate opponents, particularly the paramilitary faction led by Ernst Röhm, but Nazi propaganda justified it as preventing a supposed putsch planned or attempted by Röhm. The Nazi term Röhm-Putsch is still used by Germans to describe the event, often with quotation marks as the 'so-called Röhm Putsch'.

The 1961 Algiers putsch and the 1991 August Putsch also use the term.

The 2023 Wagner Group rebellion has also been described as a putsch.

=== Pronunciamiento and cuartelazo ===
Pronunciamiento ('pronouncement') is a term of Spanish origin for a type of coup d'état. Specifically the pronunciamiento is the formal declaration deposing the previous government and justifying the installation of the new government by the golpe de estado. Edward Luttwak distinguishes a coup, in which a military or political faction takes power for itself, from a pronunciamiento, in which the military deposes the existing government and hands over power to a new, ostensibly civilian government.

A "barracks revolt" or cuartelazo is another type of military revolt, from the Spanish term cuartel ('quarter' or 'barracks'), in which the mutiny of specific military garrisons sparks a larger military revolt against the government.

=== Other ===
Other types of actual or attempted seizures of power are sometimes called "coups with adjectives". The appropriate term can be subjective and carries normative, analytical, and political implications.

- Civil society coup
- Constitutional coup, consistent with the constitution, often by exploiting loopholes or ambiguities
- Counter-coup, a coup to repeal the result of a previous coup
- Democratic coup
- Dissident coup, in which the culprits are nominally protestors without backing from any military or police units (e.g. sometimes used to describe the January 6 United States Capitol attack)
- Electoral coup
- Judicial coup, a "legal" coup, utilizing the judiciary as the main instrument.
- Market coup
- Medical coup, having a leader declared incapacitated by doctors, such as in Tunisia in 1987
- Military coup
- Parliamentary coup
- Presidential coup
- Royal coup, in which a monarch dismisses democratically elected leaders and seizes all power (e.g. the 6 January Dictatorship by Alexander I of Yugoslavia)
- Slow-motion (or slow-moving or slow-rolling) coup

=== Revolution, rebellion ===
While a coup is usually a conspiracy of a small group, a revolution or rebellion is usually started spontaneously by larger groups of uncoordinated people. The distinction between a revolution and a coup is not always clear. Sometimes, a coup is labelled as a revolution by its plotters to feign democratic legitimacy.

== Prevalence and history ==
According to Clayton Thyne and Jonathan Powell's coup data set, there were 457 coup attempts from 1950 to 2010, of which 227 (49.7%) were successful and 230 (50.3%) were unsuccessful. They find that coups have "been most common in Africa and the Americas (36.5% and 31.9%, respectively). Asia and the Middle East have experienced 13.1% and 15.8% of total global coups, respectively. Europe has experienced by far the fewest coup attempts: 2.6%." Most coup attempts occurred in the mid-1960s, but there were also large numbers of coup attempts in the mid-1970s and the early 1990s. From 1950 to 2010, a majority of coups failed in the Middle East and Latin America. They had a somewhat higher chance of success in Africa and Asia. Numbers of successful coups have decreased over time.

A number of political science datasets document coup attempts around the world and over time, generally starting in the post-World War II period. Major examples include the Global Instances of Coups dataset, the Coups & Political Instability dataset by the Center of Systemic Peace, the Coup d'état Project by the Cline Center, the Colpus coup dataset, and the Coups and Agency Mechanism dataset. A 2023 study argued that major coup datasets tend to over-rely on international news sources to gather their information, potentially biasing the types of events included. Its findings show that while such a strategy is sufficient for gathering information on successful and failed coups, attempts to gather data on coup plots and rumors require a greater consultation of regional and local-specific sources.

== Predictors ==
A 2003 review of the academic literature found that the following factors influenced coups:

- officers' personal grievances
- military organizational grievances
- military popularity
- military attitudinal cohesiveness
- economic decline
- domestic political crisis
- contagion from other regional coups
- external threat
- participation in war
- collusion with a foreign military power
- military's national security doctrine
- officers' political culture
- noninclusive institutions
- colonial legacy
- economic development
- undiversified exports
- officers' class composition
- military size
- strength of civil society
- regime legitimacy and past coups

The literature review in a 2016 study includes mentions of ethnic factionalism, supportive foreign governments, leader inexperience, slow growth, commodity price shocks, and poverty.

Coups have been found to appear in environments that are heavily influenced by military powers. Multiple of the above factors are connected to military culture and power dynamics. These factors can be divided into multiple categories, with two of these categories being a threat to military interests and support for military interests. If interests go in either direction, the military will find itself either capitalizing off that power or attempting to gain it back.

Oftentimes, military spending is an indicator of the likelihood of a coup taking place. Nordvik found that about 75% of coups that took place in many different countries rooted from military spending and oil windfalls.

=== Coup trap ===
The accumulation of previous coups is a strong predictor of future coups, a phenomenon called the coup trap. A 2014 study of 18 Latin American countries found that the establishment of open political competition helps bring countries out of the coup trap and reduces cycles of political instability.

=== Regime type and polarization ===
Hybrid regimes are more vulnerable to coups than very authoritarian states or democratic states. A 2021 study found that democratic regimes were not substantially more likely to experience coups. A 2015 study finds that terrorism is strongly associated with re-shuffling coups. A 2016 study finds that there is an ethnic component to coups: "When leaders attempt to build ethnic armies, or dismantle those created by their predecessors, they provoke violent resistance from military officers." Another 2016 study shows that protests increase the risk of coups, presumably because they ease coordination obstacles among coup plotters and make international actors less likely to punish coup leaders. A third 2016 study finds that coups become more likely in the wake of elections in autocracies when the results reveal electoral weakness for the incumbent autocrat. A fourth 2016 study finds that inequality between social classes increases the likelihood of coups. A fifth 2016 study finds no evidence that coups are contagious; one coup in a region does not make other coups in the region likely to follow. One study found that coups are more likely to occur in states with small populations, as there are smaller coordination problems for coup-plotters.

In autocracies, the frequency of coups seems to be affected by the succession rules in place, with monarchies with a fixed succession rule being much less plagued by instability than less institutionalized autocracies.

A 2014 study of 18 Latin American countries in the 20th-century study found the legislative powers of the presidency does not influence coup frequency.

A 2019 study found that when a country's politics is polarized and electoral competition is low, civilian-recruited coups become more likely.

A 2023 study found that civilian elites are more likely to be associated with instigating military coups while civilians embedded in social networks are more likely to be associated with consolidating military coups.

=== Territorial disputes, internal conflicts, and armed conflicts ===
A 2017 study found that autocratic leaders whose states were involved in international rivalries over disputed territory were more likely to be overthrown in a coup. The authors of the study provide the following logic for why this is:

Autocratic incumbents invested in spatial rivalries need to strengthen the military in order to compete with a foreign adversary. The imperative of developing a strong army puts dictators in a paradoxical situation: to compete with a rival state, they must empower the very agency—the military—that is most likely to threaten their own survival in office.

However, two 2016 studies found that leaders who were involved in militarized confrontations and conflicts were less likely to face a coup.

A 2019 study found that states that had recently signed civil war peace agreements were much more likely to experience coups, in particular when those agreements contained provisions that jeopardized the interests of the military.

=== Popular opposition and regional rebellions ===
Research suggests that protests spur coups, as they help elites within the state apparatus to coordinate coups.

A 2019 study found that regional rebellions made coups by the military more likely.

=== Economy, development, and resource factors ===
A 2018 study found that "oil price shocks are seen to promote coups in onshore-intensive oil countries, while preventing them in offshore-intensive oil countries". The study argues that states which have onshore oil wealth tend to build up their military to protect the oil, whereas states do not do that for offshore oil wealth.

A 2020 study found that elections had a two-sided impact on coup attempts, depending on the state of the economy. During periods of economic expansion, elections reduced the likelihood of coup attempts, whereas elections during economic crises increased the likelihood of coup attempts.

A 2021 study found that oil wealthy nations see a pronounced risk of coup attempts but these coups are unlikely to succeed.

On the contrary, a 2014 study of 18 Latin American countries in the 20th century found that coup frequency does not vary with development levels, economic inequality, or the rate of economic growth.

=== Coup-proofing ===
In what is referred to as "coup-proofing", regimes create structures that make it hard for any small group to seize power. These coup-proofing strategies may include the strategic placing of family, ethnic, and religious groups in the military; creation of an armed force parallel to the regular military; and development of multiple internal security agencies with overlapping jurisdiction that constantly monitor one another. It may also involve frequent salary hikes and promotions for members of the military, and the deliberate use of diverse bureaucrats. Research shows that some coup-proofing strategies reduce the risk of coups occurring. However, coup-proofing reduces military effectiveness, (Note: Multiple sources:) and limits the rents that an incumbent can extract. One reason why authoritarian governments tend to have incompetent militaries is that authoritarian regimes fear that their military will stage a coup or allow a domestic uprising to proceed uninterrupted – as a consequence, authoritarian rulers have incentives to place incompetent loyalists in key positions in the military.

A 2016 study shows that the implementation of succession rules reduce the occurrence of coup attempts. Succession rules are believed to hamper coordination efforts among coup plotters by assuaging elites who have more to gain by patience than by plotting.

According to political scientists Curtis Bell and Jonathan Powell, coup attempts in neighbouring countries lead to greater coup-proofing and coup-related repression in a region. A 2017 study finds that countries' coup-proofing strategies are heavily influenced by other countries with similar histories. Coup-proofing is more likely in former French colonies.

A 2018 study in the Journal of Peace Research found that leaders who survive coup attempts and respond by purging known and potential rivals are likely to have longer tenures as leaders. A 2019 study in Conflict Management and Peace Science found that personalist dictatorships are more likely to take coup-proofing measures than other authoritarian regimes; the authors argue that this is because "personalists are characterized by weak institutions and narrow support bases, a lack of unifying ideologies and informal links to the ruler".

In their 2022 book Revolution and Dictatorship: The Violent Origins of Durable Authoritarianism, political scientists Steven Levitsky and Lucan Way found that political-military fusion, where the ruling party is highly interlinked with the military and created the administrative structures of the military from its inception, is extremely effective at preventing military coups. For example, the People's Liberation Army was created by the Chinese Communist Party during the Chinese Civil War, and never instigated a military coup even after large-scale policy failures (i.e. the Great Leap Forward) or the extreme political instability of the Cultural Revolution.

Some scholars have posited that the recruitment of foreign legionnaires into national armies can reduce the probability of military coups.

== Outcomes ==
Successful coups are one method of regime change that thwarts the peaceful transition of power. A 2016 study categorizes four possible outcomes to coups in dictatorships:

- Failed coup
- No regime change, as when a leader is illegally shuffled out of power without changing the ruling group or the type of government
- Replacement of incumbent with another dictatorship
- Ousting of the dictatorship followed by democratization (also called "democratic coups")

The study found that about half of all coups in dictatorships—both during and after the Cold War—install new autocratic regimes. New dictatorships launched by coups engage in higher levels of repression in the year after the coup than existed in the year before the coup. One-third of coups in dictatorships during the Cold War and 10% of later ones reshuffled the regime leadership. Democracies were installed in the wake of 12% of Cold War coups in dictatorships and 40% of post-Cold War ones.

Coups occurring in the post-Cold War period have been more likely to result in democratic systems than Cold War coups, though coups still mostly perpetuate authoritarianism. Coups that occur during civil wars shorten the war's duration.

== Impact ==
=== Democracy ===
Coups and the end of the Cold War
Time period	Initial regime type	% of regimes facing coups in period*
1950–1990 (Cold War)	Autocracies	49%
1950–1990 (Cold War)	Democracies	35%
1990–2015	Autocracies	12%
1990–2015	Democracies	12%

Coups and the end of the Cold War
Time period	Coup seizes power	Change only in leadership	New autocratic regime	Democratization within 2 years
1950–1990 (Cold War); 223, 5.575 attempts per year	Successful; 125, 3 1/8 per year	32% 40	56% 70	12% 15
1950–1990 (Cold War); 223, 5.575 attempts per year	Unsuccessful; 98, 2.45 per year	75	15	8
1990–2015; 49, 1.96 attempts per year	Successful; 20, 0.8 per year	10% 2	50% 10	40% 8
1990–2015; 49, 1.96 attempts per year	Unsuccessful; 29, 1.16/year	19	3	7

Since the end of the Cold War, coups have become rarer, and more likely to be followed by democratization. Coups still often simply replace one autocracy with another one (with the new autocratic regime usually more repressive, in an attempt to prevent another coup) or have no effect on regime type.

As of 2017, there was debate about whether coups in autocracies should now be considered to promote democratization, on average, or if countries' chances of democratization are still unchanged or worsened by coups (since democratization can take place without a coup). One reason for the increase in the chance of democratization is that a higher proportion of coups (half of post-Cold-War coups) now take place in democracies (a higher percentage of countries are also now democracies). Democratic countries often rebound from coups quickly, restoring democracy, but coups in a democracy are a sign of poor political health, and increase the risk of future coups and loss of democracy. The dataset is small, so statistical significance varies depending on the model used, as of 2017; debate will end if data on more coups makes the pattern clear.

The post-Cold-War increase in the chances of post-coup democratization may partly be due to the incentives created by international pressure and financing. US law, for instance, automatically cuts off all aid to a country if there is a military coup. According to a 2020 study, "external reactions to coups play important roles in whether coup leaders move toward authoritarianism or democratic governance. When supported by external democratic actors, coup leaders have an incentive to push for elections to retain external support and consolidate domestic legitimacy. When condemned, coup leaders are apt to trend toward authoritarianism to assure their survival.

But coup conspirators also increasingly say that they chose a coup to save their country from the autocratic incumbents. Successful conspirators may hold free and fair elections simply because they think it is a good idea. A desire for economic growth and legitimacy have also been cited as motivations for democratization.

Legal scholar Ilya Somin believes that a coup to forcibly overthrow a democratic government might sometimes be justified. Commenting on the 2016 Turkish coup d'état attempt, Somin opined,

There should be a strong presumption against forcibly removing a democratic regime. But that presumption might be overcome if the government in question poses a grave threat to human rights, or is likely to destroy democracy itself by shutting down future political competition.

=== Repression and counter-coups ===
It has been argued that failed coups might motivate a regime to reform and reduce repression. Such reforms are not obvious in the data, as of 2017. Coups that fail, or merely shuffle the leadership without changing the system, generally do not change the amount of repression (measured in government-sanctioned and pro-government killings).

Research from 2016 suggests that increased repression and violence typically follow both successful and unsuccessful coup attempts. According to a 2019 study, coup attempts lead to a reduction in physical integrity rights.

Coups that lead to democratization unsurprisingly reduce repression, and coups that bring in a new autocratic regime increase it. Post-Cold-War, post-coup autocracies seem to have become more repressive and post-coup democracies less repressive; the gap between them is therefore larger than it was during the Cold War.

Averaging across democratic and non-democratic outcomes, most coups seem to tend to increase state repression, even coups against autocrats who were already quite repressive. The time interval in which violence is measured matters. The months after a bloodless coup can be bloody. The small sample size and high variability means that this conclusion again does not reach statistical significance, and a firm conclusion cannot be drawn.

According to Naunihal Singh, author of Seizing Power: The Strategic Logic of Military Coups (2014), it is "fairly rare" for the incumbent government to violently purge the army after a failed coup. If it starts the mass killing of elements of the army, including officers who were not involved in the coup, this may trigger a "counter-coup" by soldiers who are afraid they will be next. To prevent such a desperate counter-coup that may be more successful than the initial attempt, governments usually resort to firing prominent officers and replacing them with loyalists instead.

Notable counter-coups include the Ottoman countercoup of 1909, the 1960 Laotian counter-coup, the Indonesian mass killings of 1965–66, the 1966 Nigerian counter-coup, the 1967 Greek counter-coup, 1971 Sudanese counter-coup, and the coup d'état of December Twelfth in South Korea.

A 2017 study finds that the use of state broadcasting by the putschist regime after Mali's 2012 coup did not elevate explicit approval for the regime.

=== International response ===
The international community tends to react adversely to coups by reducing aid and imposing sanctions. A 2015 study finds that "coups against democracies, coups after the Cold War, and coups in states heavily integrated into the international community are all more likely to elicit global reaction." Another 2015 study shows that coups are the strongest predictor for the imposition of democratic sanctions. A third 2015 study finds that Western states react most strongly against coups of possible democratic and human rights abuses. A 2016 study shows that the international donor community in the post-Cold War period penalizes coups by reducing foreign aid. The US has been inconsistent in applying aid sanctions against coups both during the Cold War and post-Cold War periods, a likely consequence of its geopolitical interests.

Organizations such as the African Union (AU) and the Organization of American States (OAS) have adopted anti-coup frameworks. Through the threat of sanctions, the organizations actively try to curb coups. A 2016 study finds that the AU has played a meaningful role in reducing African coups.

A 2017 study found that negative international responses, especially from powerful actors, have a significant effect in shortening the duration of regimes created in coups.

According to a 2020 study, coups increase the cost of borrowing and increase the likelihood of sovereign default.

== Current leaders who assumed power via coups ==
Leaders are arranged in chronological order by the dates they assumed power, and categorized by the continents their countries are in.

=== Asia ===
Position	Post-coup leader	Deposed leader	Country	Event	Date
President	Emomali Rahmon	Rahmon Nabiyev (Note: Nabiyev was forced to resign by government militia on 7 September 1992, with Emomali Rahmon assumed interim power in November. Emomali Rahmon was, at the time, known as Emomali Rahmonov (see Name changes).)	Tajikistan	Tajikistani Civil War	19 November 1992
President of the Supreme Political Council	Mahdi al-Mashat	Abdrabbuh Mansur Hadi (Note: Hadi was forced to resign by Houthi rebels on 22 January 2015, but later renounced his resignation. The coup culminated into a civil war.)	Yemen	Houthi takeover in Yemen	6 February 2015
Prime Minister and Chairman of the State Administration Council	Min Aung Hlaing	Aung San Suu Kyi	Myanmar	2021 Myanmar coup d'état	2 February 2021

=== Africa ===
Position	Post-coup leader	Deposed leader	Country	Event	Date
President	Teodoro Obiang Nguema Mbasogo	Francisco Macías Nguema	Equatorial Guinea	1979 Equatoguinean coup d'état	3 August 1979
President	Yoweri Museveni	Tito Okello	Uganda	Ugandan Bush War	29 January 1986
President	Denis Sassou Nguesso	Pascal Lissouba	Congo	Republic of the Congo Civil War	25 October 1997
President	Abdel Fattah el-Sisi	Mohamed Morsi	Egypt	2013 Egyptian coup d'état	3 July 2013
President	Emmerson Mnangagwa	Robert Mugabe (Note: Mugabe resigned on 21 November 2017.)	Zimbabwe	2017 Zimbabwean coup d'état	24 November 2017
Chairman of the Transitional Sovereignty Council	Abdel Fattah al-Burhan	Omar al-Bashir	Sudan	2019 Sudanese coup d'état	21 August 2019
Chairman of the National Committee for the Salvation of the People of Mali	Assimi Goïta	Bah Ndaw	Mali	2021 Malian coup d'état	25 May 2021
President	Kais Saied	Hichem Mechichi (Note: Prime Minister, Head of Government (under Tunisian Constitution, Shared Executive Power), Kais Saied Also Abolished the Parliament, which represents the Legislative Power in a representative Democracy))	Tunisia	2021 Tunisian self-coup (Note: "Constitutional" Coup, By Activation of Article 80 (full Power Seizure in case of "Imminent Danger"), which is not well-defined, as there is a conflict of interest if the president is the sole arbiter of defining "Danger", and there is no judicial reconciliation (Ex. Constitutional/Supreme Court), Kais Saied removed Head of Government and Parliament)	25 July 2021
Chairman of the National Committee of Reconciliation and Development	Mamady Doumbouya	Alpha Condé	Guinea	2021 Guinean coup d'état	5 September 2021
President of the Patriotic Movement for Safeguard and Restoration	Ibrahim Traoré	Paul-Henri Sandaogo Damiba	Burkina Faso	September 2022 Burkinabé coup d'état	30 September 2022
President of the National Council for the Safeguard of the Homeland	Abdourahamane Tiani	Mohamed Bazoum	Niger	2023 Nigerien coup d'état	26 July 2023
Head of the Committee for the Transition and Restoration of Institutions	Brice Clotaire Oligui Nguema	Ali Bongo Ondimba	Gabon	2023 Gabonese coup d'état	30 August 2023
Chairman of Council of the Presidency of the Republic for Reform	Michael Randrianirina	Andry Rajoelina	Madagascar	2025 Malagasy coup d'état	14 October 2025

== See also ==
- Assassination
- Coup d'État: A Practical Handbook
- Coup de main
- Mutiny
- Sabotage
- Soft coup
- State collapse
- Succession crisis
- List of coups and coup attempts by country
- List of coups and coup attempts
- List of coups and coup attempts since 2010
