= Imperial Rule and the Politics of Nationalism =

2013 book by Adria Lawrence

- Author: Adria Lawrence
- Subject: colonialism
- Published: 2013
- Publisher: Cambridge University Press
- Pages: 298 pp.
- ISBN: 9781107640757

Imperial Rule and the Politics of Nationalism: Anti-Colonial Protest in the French Empire is a book-length study of national independence from the French colonial empire by Adria Lawrence.

== Awards ==
- 2015 J. David Greenstone Book Prize for best book in history and politics
- 2015 L. Carl Brown Book Prize
- 2014 Jervis-Schroeder Best Book Award
- 2011 Frank L. Wilson Best APSA Paper Award
- 2013 Foreign Policy Middle East Channel's Best Books on the Middle East
