= Maria Stephan =

American political scientist

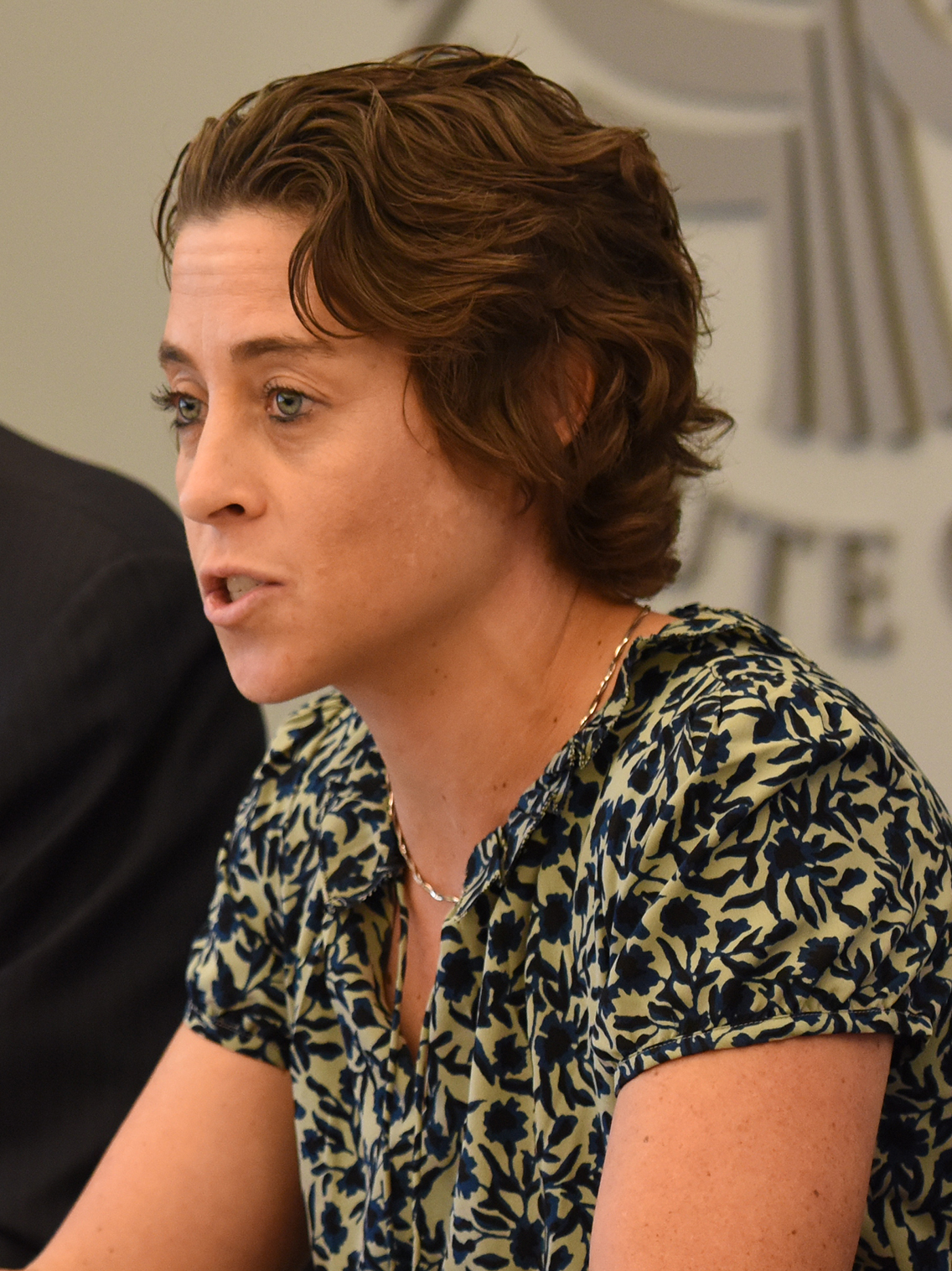
- Stephan in 2016
- Education: Boston College (BA); Fletcher School of Law and Diplomacy (MALD, PhD)
- Awards: Grawemeyer Award; Henry J. Leir Human Security Award
- Scientific career
- Fields: Political science
- Institutions: United States Department of Defense; NATO headquarters; United States Institute of Peace

Maria J. Stephan is an American political scientist. She is co-lead and chief organizer with the Horizons Project. Previously, she was the director of the program on nonviolent action at the United States Institute of Peace. She studies authoritarianism, protest, and the effectiveness of violent and nonviolent types of civil resistance.

== Education and early work ==
Stephan is from Vermont, and earned a Bachelor of Arts degree at Boston College. She then attended the Fletcher School of Law and Diplomacy, where she earned a Master of Arts degree in Law and Diplomacy and Doctor of Philosophy. During her graduate education she was the recipient of a Harry S. Truman Scholarship, which is a graduate fellowship dedicated to public service. She was also a J. William Fulbright Scholar.

== Career ==
Before working with the United States Institute of Peace, Stephan worked at the United States Department of State where she was the lead foreign affairs officer for the Bureau of Conflict and Stabilization Operations, and at NATO headquarters. She also co-directed the Future of Authoritarianism initiative at the Atlantic Council, which informed activists and practitioners about global democracy trends and strategies for confronting authoritarianism. Stephan directed policy and educational initiatives at the International Center on Nonviolent Conflict, supporting dissidents and movements globally.

Together with Erica Chenoweth, Stephan wrote the 2011 book Why Civil Resistance Works: The Strategic Logic of Nonviolent Conflict. The book studies the success rates of civil resistance efforts from 1900 to 2006, focusing on the major violent and nonviolent efforts to bring about regime change during that time. By comparing the success rates of 323 violent and nonviolent campaigns, Stephan and Chenoweth demonstrate that only 26% of violent revolutions were successful, whereas 53% of nonviolent campaigns were successful. Of the 25 largest movements they studied, 20 were nonviolent, and they found that nonviolent movements attracted four times as many participants on average than violent movements. They also demonstrated that nonviolent movements tended to precede the development of more democratic regimes than violent movements.

Chenoweth then coined a rule about the level of participation necessary for a movement to succeed, called the "3.5% rule": nearly every movement with active participation from at least 3.5% of the population succeeded. All of the campaigns that achieved that threshold were nonviolent.

Why Civil Resistance Works won the 2012 Woodrow Wilson Foundation Prize from the American Political Science Association, which is awarded each year for "the best book on government, politics, or international affairs". For Why Civil Resistance Works, Stephan and her coauthor Erica Chenoweth won the 2013 Grawemeyer Award for Ideas Improving World Order. In 2015 Stephan was the recipient of the inaugural Henry J. Leir Human Security Award, which is awarded by Institute for Human Security at Fletcher University for "outstanding Fletcher alumni who have made significant contributions to the scholarship and/or practice of human security".

Stephan's work has been covered extensively in media outlets like The Globe and Mail, Vice, NPR, and Quartz.

== See also ==
- Civilian-based defense
