= Edward Luttwak =

Romanian–American military strategist (born 1942)

Edward N. Luttwak
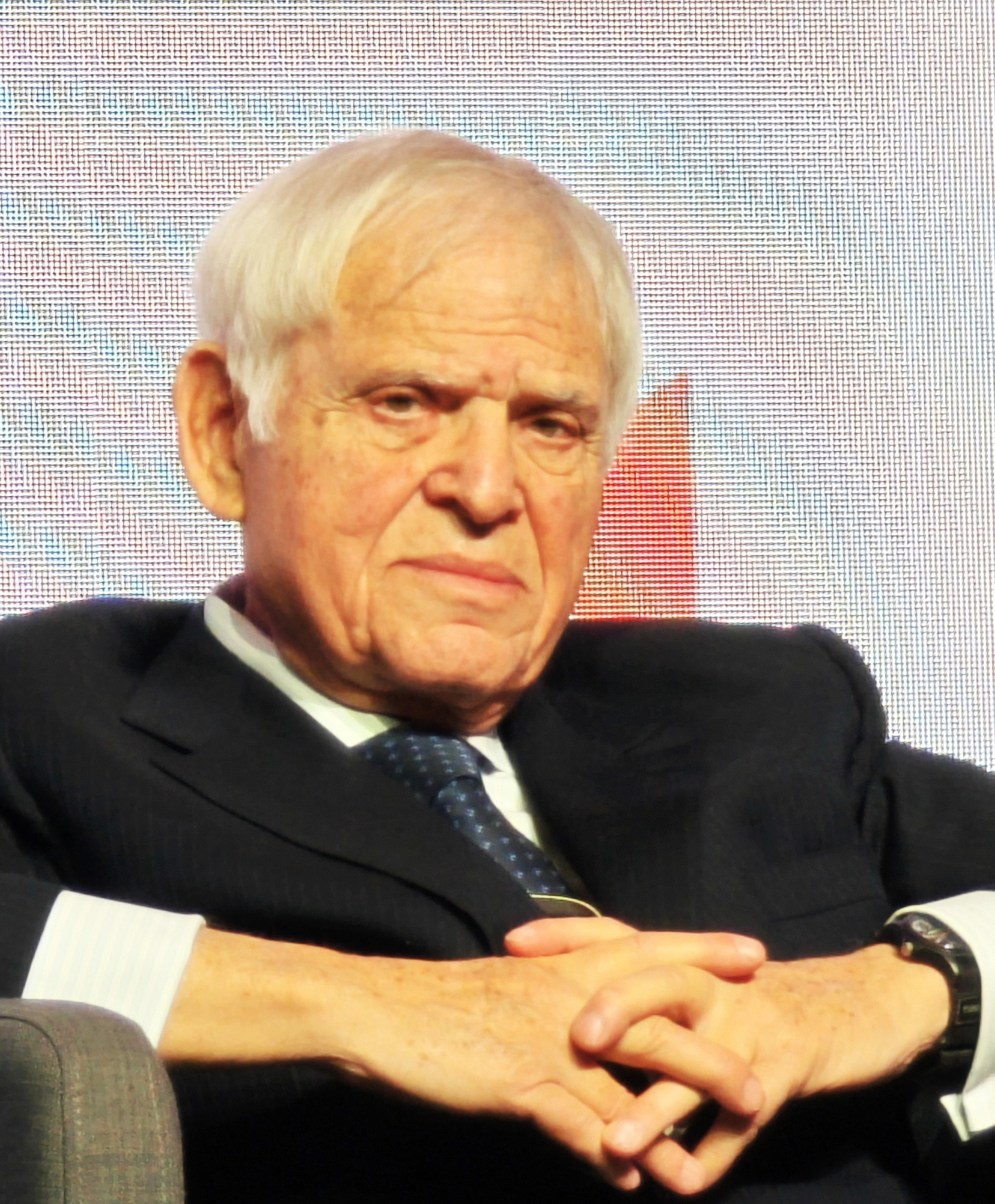
- Born: 4 November 1942 (age 83); Arad, Romania
- Education: London School of Economics and Political Science; Johns Hopkins University
- Known for: Coup d'État: A Practical Handbook (1968); Strategy: The Logic of War and Peace (1987); The Rise of China vs. the Logic of Strategy (2012)

Edward Nicolae Luttwak (born 4 November 1942) is an American author known for his works on grand strategy, military strategy, geoeconomics, military history, and international relations. He is best known for being the author of Coup d'État: A Practical Handbook. His book Strategy: The Logic of War and Peace, also published in Chinese, Russian and ten other languages, is widely used at war colleges around the world. His books are currently published in 29 languages besides English.

== Early life ==
Luttwak was born into a Jewish family in Arad, Romania which fled just before the advent of the Communist regime, in the summer of 1948.

== Career ==
After attending Carmel College, a boarding school in Wallingford, Berkshire, where he joined the British Army cadet corps in which he was trained in basic infantry tactics by El Alamein veterans of the Oxfordshire and Buckinghamshire Light Infantry, the later Green Jackets, Luttwak moved to London at the age of 16 and went to the Quintin Grammar School, but kept up his Cadet Corps attendance. From 1961, he studied analytical economics and the Logic of Science with Karl Popper at the London School of Economics. After receiving his BSc (Econ) degree in 1964, he taught Economics at the University of Bath. In 1968, when he was 26 and working in London as a consultant for the oil industry, he published the book Coup d'État: A Practical Handbook, a pastiche of a military manual. The book explains in detail how to overthrow the government of a state, looking in particular at coups d'état on the African continent and in the Middle East. The spy fiction author John le Carré praised the book and compared Luttwak to Machiavelli. Luttwak graduated from the London School of Economics in 1969.

Luttwak was a war volunteer in Israel in 1967 and later worked for the Israel Defense Forces. In 1972 he moved to the United States for graduate studies at the Johns Hopkins University in Baltimore while living in Washington, D.C. for its consulting opportunities, returning to Israel as a 1973 war volunteer for the duration. He graduated with a PhD in International Relations in 1975. The title of his dissertation was Force and Diplomacy in Roman Strategies of Imperial Security. Earlier, during a two-month visit to Washington, D.C. in 1969, Luttwak and Richard Perle, his former roommate in London, had joined the Committee to Maintain a Prudent Defense Policy, assembled by Dean Acheson and Paul Nitze to lobby Congress for the Safeguard anti-ballistic missile systems.

In late 1974 and into 1975 a series of articles was published by neoconservative intellectuals discussing whether the US military should seize the oilfields in Saudi Arabia. In March 1975, Harper's Magazine published an article that Luttwak had written under the pseudonym "Miles Ignotus" with the title "Seizing Arab Oil." Luttwak had previously published the gist of his argument on how to break Arab power under the title "Obsolescent Elites", using his real name, in The Times Literary Supplement. He suggested that U.S. Marines, assisted by the 82nd Airborne Division, should storm the eastern beaches of Saudi Arabia. The article and the author attracted considerable attention, but there is no evidence that the Ford administration ever considered such an intervention. James Akins, then U.S. Ambassador to Saudi Arabia—and immediately afterwards a paid consultant for Saudi Arabia, publicly denounced the "invasion scenario" as a product of "sick minds." In 2004 Luttwak told the Wall Street Journal that he had written the article "after discussion with several like-minded consultants and officials in the Pentagon."

In 1976 Luttwak published his dissertation, The Grand Strategy of the Roman Empire from the First Century AD to the Third, which generated controversy among professional historians who saw Luttwak as an outsider and a non-specialist in the field. However, the book is recognized as seminal because it raised basic questions about the Roman Army and its defense of the Roman frontier. Kimberly Kagan, writing in the Journal of Military History, states "Ancient historians have demonstrated that Edward Luttwak's The Grand Strategy of the Roman Empire does not accurately describe Roman grand strategy, and many conclude that there was no Roman imperial grand strategy." Tanner Greer writes "So conclusively wrong is this book that I do not think it should be included on any syllabus. Since Luttwak published that book in 1976, a dozen studies of Roman frontier deployments, Roman strategic culture, and Roman decision making have been published. All offer a steady refutation of Luttwak’s work. However, not one of those books or articles would have been written without Luttwak’s work. Luttwak was wrong in every particular except the questions he asked—but those questions were good enough to create an entire subfield of research."

While writing his dissertation, he was hired as a consultant by Secretary of Defense James Schlesinger at the initiative of his Assistant Francis J West (USMC ret). He met Andrew W. "Yoda" Marshall founding Director of Office of Net Assessment in 1974, intermittently researching strategic subjects for ONA for the next 39 years. Later Luttwak started researching the Byzantine empire, beginning with its earliest surviving texts, printed in unedited, untraslated Greek texts . According to Harry Sidebottom, the majority of scholars were hostile to Luttwak's enthusiasm for fighting wars on client state territory and the book made uncomfortable reading in some circles in western Europe because in the 1980s Luttwak became a security consultant to U.S. President Ronald Reagan.

In 1987 Luttwak published Strategy: The Logic of War and Peace. According to Luttwak's publisher, Harvard University Press, the book has been widely acclaimed. Luttwak became known for his innovative ideas. He suggested, for example, that attempts by major powers to quell regional wars actually make conflicts more protracted.

Luttwak went on to provide consulting services for many years to the Toyota Motor Corporation in Japan, till abruptly fired when he became an occasional consultant to Prime Minister Shinzo Abe (albeit with a Japan Foreign Ministry contract) from the start of his premiership till his retirement. At tines he also worked as a consultant for Northrop Corporation and government entities, including the State Department various branches of the U.S. armed forces.

Luttwak has served on the editorial boards of Géopolitique (France), the Journal of Strategic Studies, The European Journal of International Affairs, and the Washington Quarterly. He speaks English, French, Hebrew, Italian, and Spanish, in addition to rusty juvenile Hungarian and Romanian. In 1997, with three partners, he purchased 19,000 hectares of land in the far west of the Bolivian Amazon, where he raised cattle on the natural grassland between rainforest "islas", returning each year for the working season. cattle ranch.

Luttwak was a lecturer in economics at the University of Bath from 1964 to 1966. In 2004 Luttwak was awarded an honorary doctorate degree (LLD) from the University of Bath. He has also received honorary degrees from a university in Arad, Romania and another from Timisoara's University as well as the University of Bucharest. His book The Grand Strategy of the Byzantine Empire was published in late 2009.

Leon Wieseltier, who got to know Luttwak during the Reagan years, wrote: "Edward was this figure out of a Werner Herzog film. He was not some person who had read a bit of Tacitus and now worked at the Pentagon. He knew all the languages, the geographies, the cultures, the histories. He is the most bizarre humanist I have ever met."

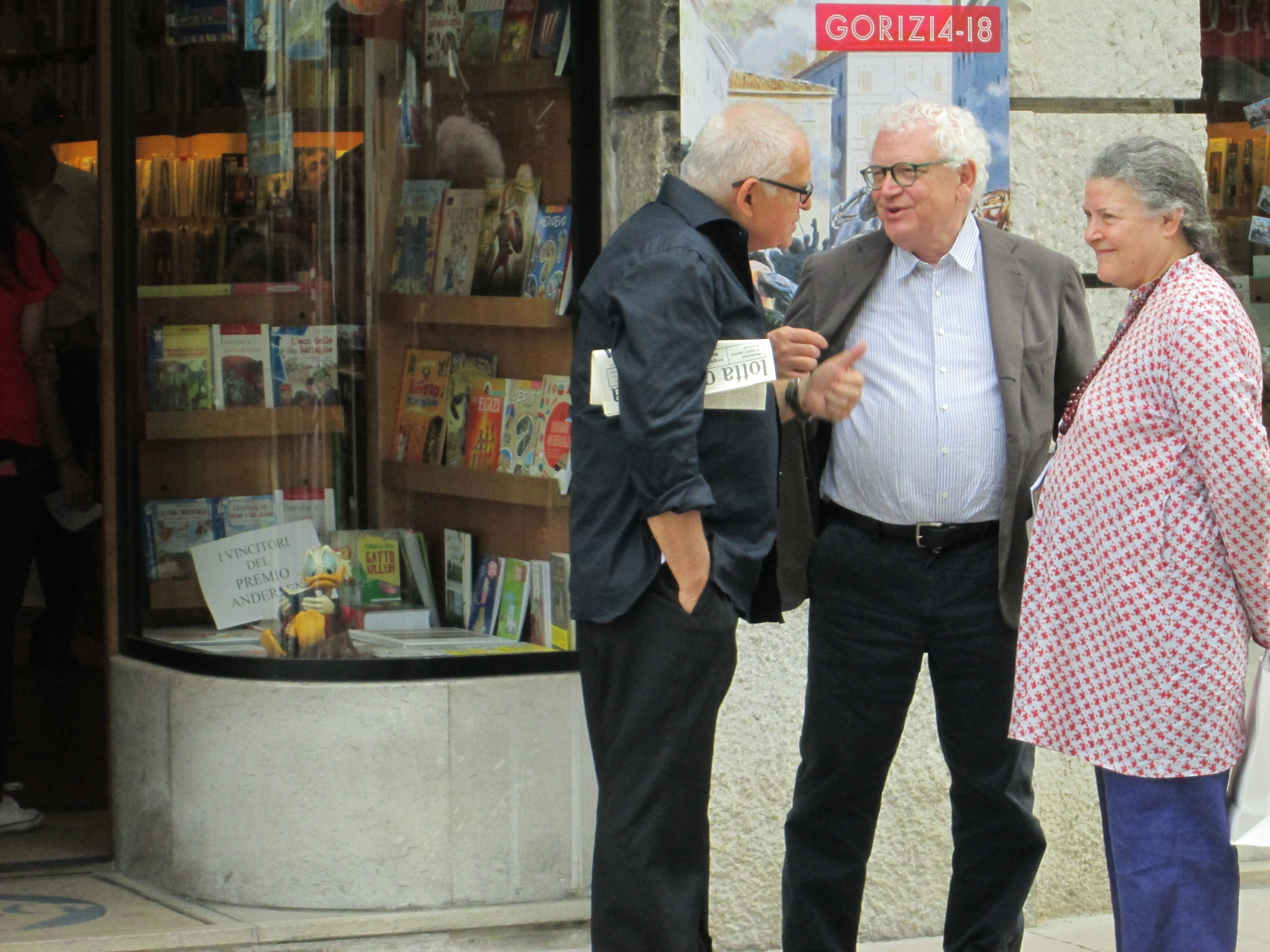
Edward Luttwak holds an issue of Lotta Comunista, Italian Left Communist monthly.

== Predictions ==
Before the first Persian Gulf War Luttwak incorrectly predicted that Iraqi President Saddam Hussein would evacuate Kuwait "after a week or two of bombing" [the bombing continued for six weeks without inducing him to do so] and warned that the use of ground forces without heavy preliminary bombing "could make Desert Storm a bloody, grinding combat with thousands of (US) casualties." Writing a month into the bombing, Luttwak still opposed a ground campaign. He forecast that it would lead inevitably to a military occupation of Iraq from which the United States would be unable to disengage without disastrous foreign policy consequences.

In the 1999 book Turbo-Capitalism: Winners and Losers in the Global Economy Luttwak predicted that dynamic economic growth would increase ugly social phenomena such as higher crime rates and job insecurity, as anticipated in his London Review of Books article "Why Fascism is the Wave of the Future". New York Magazine described Luttwak's article as forecasting the rise of Donald Trump to the American presidency, citing his article's predictions about a political vacuum emerging from the neglect of workers from political party establishments.

In 2009, Richard Posner analyzed intellectuals with a public profile in the U.S. Posner claimed that Luttwak sees many affinities between the United States and the declining Roman Empire, leading Luttwak to predict a dark age in which the U.S. population will experience decline into third world status. According to Posner, Luttwak retained his economic pessimism when the economy of the United States stood at the turn of the century.

Luttwak predicted in a 2016 op-ed in The Wall Street Journal that the Trump administration would pursue a foreign policy "unlikely to deviate from standard conservative norms", withdrawing troops from Afghanistan and Iraq, avoiding involvement in Syria and Libya, eschewing trade wars, and modestly reducing spending — in short, "changes at the margin". In fact, Trump initiated his first trade war during his first term in office in January 2018, and his second trade war in February 2025.

== On grand strategy ==
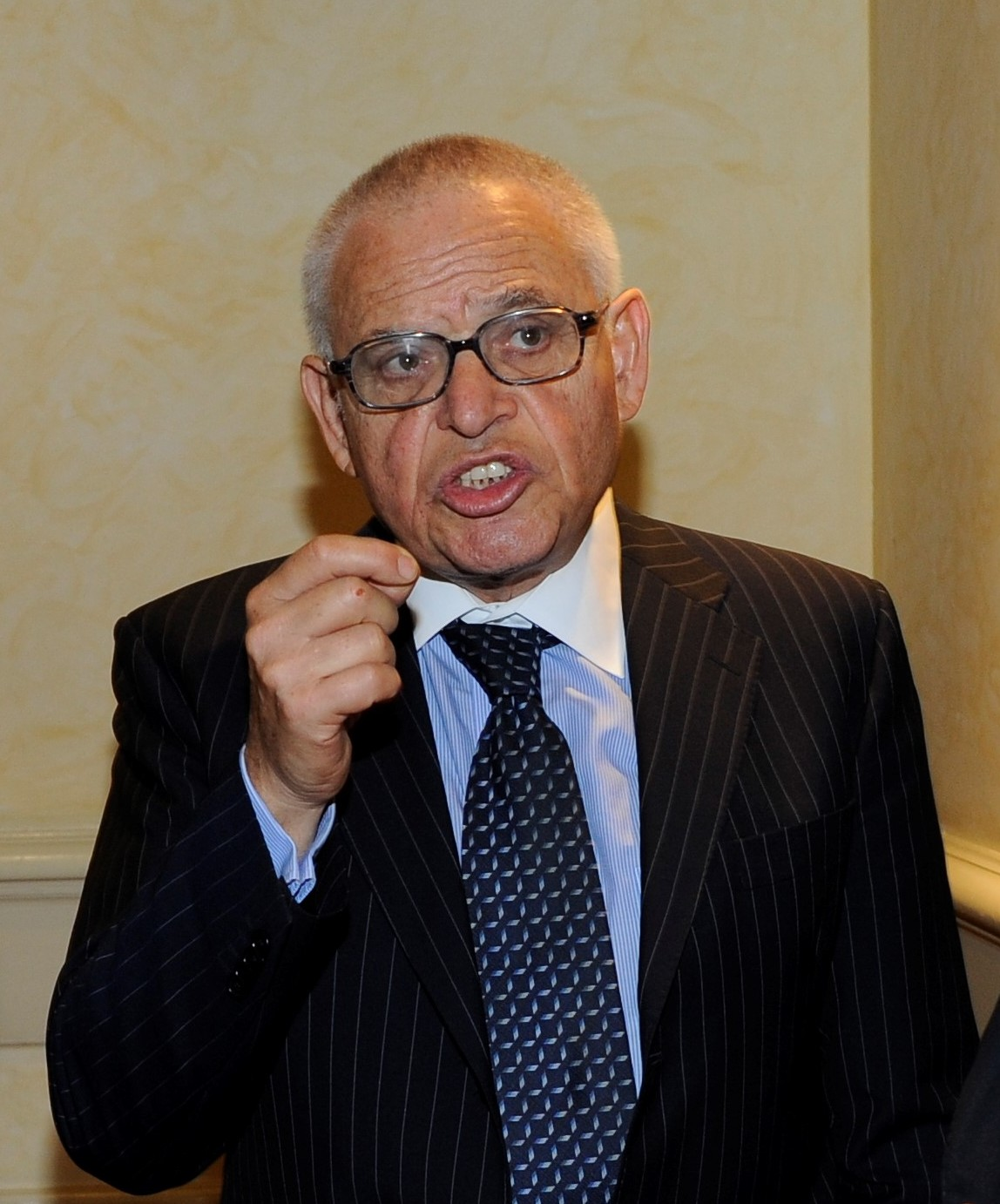
Edward Luttwak in 2011

Luttwak has long insisted on the necessity of a grand strategy, but he moved beyond preoccupation with military intervention, and started to theorize diplomacy and military alliances. His Grand Strategy of the Soviet Union (1983) was the first English-language text that recognized the different nationalities that were re-emerging in the USSR and were ignored by both "Kremlinologists" and U.S. intelligence. Luttwak concluded that the Soviet Union relied entirely on military instruments for its grand strategy.

Luttwak argued that Carl von Clausewitz's warning against aggressive wars was no longer relevant in the post-World War II era. He reasoned that when confronted with weapons of mass destruction, statecraft needed a grand strategy, that is, "the firm subordination of tactical priorities, material ideals, and warlike instincts to political goals". For Luttwak, grand strategy was no longer a military doctrine, but a political issue, and diplomacy was needed to achieve the security of the state.

Writing in 2007 for the National Review, former George W. Bush's speechwriter David Frum said of Luttwak: "His book on the grand strategy of the Roman Empire was terrific, and his Coup d'État is that astounding thing: a great work of political science that is also a hilarious satire."

== Personal life ==
Luttwak describes himself as a "fanatical snorkeler" and exercises every day. He lives with his wife in Maryland. He has a son and daughter, as well as three grandchildren.

== Works ==
=== Books ===
- Coup d'État: A Practical Handbook (London, Allen Lane, 1968; Revised Edition: Cambridge, MA, 1979; London, 1979; Sydney, 1979) ISBN 978-0713900675
- A Dictionary of Modern War (London, Allen Lane, 1971; revised edition in 1991 with Stuart L. Koehl; new edition in 1998) ISBN 978-0713901306
- The Strategic Balance, 1972 (New York, Library Press, 1972) ISBN 978-0912050331
- The Political Uses of Sea Power (Baltimore, Johns Hopkins University Press, 1974) ISBN 978-0801816598
- The US–USSR Nuclear Weapons Balance (Beverly Hills, Sage Publications, 1974) ISBN 978-0803900967
- The Israeli Army: 1948-1973 (with Daniel Horowitz) (New York, HarperCollins and London, Allen Lane, 1975) ISBN 978-0713902297
- The Grand Strategy of the Roman Empire from the First Century AD to the Third (Baltimore, Johns Hopkins University Press, 1976) ISBN 978-0801818639; Luttwak, Edward (May 18, 2016). revised & updated 2016 edition. JHU Press. ISBN 9781421419459; pbk
- Strategic Power: Military Capabilities and Political Utility (California, 1976) ISBN 0-8039-0659-5
- Sea Power in the Mediterranean: Political Utility and Military Constraints (California, 1979) ISBN 0-8191-6010-5
- Strategy and Politics: Collected Essays (New Brunswick, Transaction Publishers, 1980), ISBN 978-0878553464
- The Grand Strategy of the Soviet Union (New York, St. Martin's Press, 1983) ISBN 978-0312342609
- The Pentagon and the Art of War: The Question of Military Reform (New York, Simon & Schuster, 1985) ISBN 978-0671524326
- Strategy and History: Collected Essays, Volume Two (New Brunswick, Transaction Publishers, 1985) ISBN 978-0887380655
- On the Meaning of Victory: Essays on Strategy (New York, Simon & Schuster, 1986), ISBN 978-0671610890
- Strategy: The Logic of War and Peace (Cambridge, Massachusetts, 1987) ISBN 978-0674839953

- The Paradoxical Logic of Strategy Nimitz Memorial Lectures (Institute of International Studies, University of California, Berkeley, 1987) ISBN 0-87725-601-2 LCCN 87--83237

- The Endangered American Dream: How To Stop the United States from Being a Third World Country and How To Win the Geo-Economic Struggle for Industrial Supremacy (New York, Simon & Schuster, 1993) ISBN 978-0067186930
- Turbo-Capitalism: Winners and Losers in the Global Economy (London, Weidenfeld & Nicolson, 1998), ISBN 978-0297818847
- Strategy: The Logic of War and Peace, Revised and Enlarged Edition (Cambridge, Massachusetts, 2002) ISBN 978-0-674-00703-1
- The Middle of Nowhere: Why the Middle East Is Not Important (London, Atlantic Books, 2008) ISBN 978-1843548188
- The Grand Strategy of the Byzantine Empire (Cambridge, Massachusetts, 2009) ISBN 978-0-674-03519-5
- The Virtual American Empire: War, Faith, And Power (New Brunswick and London, Transaction Publishers, 2009) ISBN 978-1412810401
- The Rise of China vs. the Logic of Strategy (Cambridge, Massachusetts, 2012) ISBN 978-0-674-06642-7
- with Eitan Shamir, The Art of Military Innovation: Lessons from the Israel Defense Forces. Harvard University Press. October 10, 2023. ISBN 9780674660052. catalog entry at Harvard U. Press

In Japanese only:

- "China 4.0" (Tokyo, 2016) ISBN 978-4166610631
- "Japan 4.0" (Tokyo, 2018) ISBN 978-4166611829
- "Japan 4.0" in Mongolian only (Cyrillic) (Ulaan Baatar, 2019) ISBN 978-9919-9504-0-8
- ルトワックの日本改造論/エドワード・ルトワック／著 奥山真司／訳 ... [Rejuvenating Japan: A National Strategy] (Tokyo: Asuka Shinsha, 2019) ISBN 978-4-86410-728-0 [co-authored with Dr. Okuyama Masashi].

In Italian only:

- Che cos'è davvero la democrazia (What really is democracy) with Susanna Creperio Verratti (Milan, Arnoldo Mondadori, 1995) ISBN 978-8804408697
- Il fantasma della povertà: una nuova politica per difendere il benessere dei cittadini (The ghost of poverty: a new policy to defend the wellbeing of citizens) with Carlo Pelanda and Giulio Tremonti (Milan, Arnoldo Mondadori, 1995) ISBN 978-8804400660
- Dove va l'Italia? Intervista a Edward Luttwak (Where is Italy going? Interview with Edward Luttwak) with Gianni Perrelli (Newton Compton, 1997) ISBN 978-8881837267
- Il libro delle libertà. Il cittadino e lo stato: regole, diritti e doveri in una democrazia (The book of liberties. The citizen and the state: rules, rights and duties in a democracy) with Susanna Creperio Verratti (Arnoldo Mondadori, 2000) ISBN 978-8804408703
- I nuovi condottieri. Vincere nel XXI secolo (The new leaders. Winning in the 21st century) with Arduino Paniccia (Padua, Marsilio, 2000) ISBN 978-8831775106

As contributor:

- Vietnam: Four American Perspectives edited by Patrick J. Hearden with The Impact of Vietnam on Strategic Thinking in the United States (Purdue University Press, 1990) ISBN 978-1557530028
- The Tanner Lectures on Human Values, 1991 edited by Grethe B. Peterson with Strategy: A New Era? (University of Utah, 1991) ISBN 978-0874803501
- Feeding Mars: Logistics in Western Warfare from the Middle Ages to the Present edited by John A. Lynn with Logistics and the Aristocratic Idea of War (Boulder, Westview Press, 1994)
- Voluntary Simplicity: Responding to Consumer Culture edited by Daniel Doherty and Amitai Etzioni with Consuming For Love (Lanham, Rowman & Littlefield Publishers, 2003) ISBN 978-0742520660

Preface, foreword:

- The Parameters Of War: Military History from the Journal of the U.S. Army War College edited by Lloyd J. Matthews and Dale E. Brown (Washington, Pergamon-Brassey's, 1987) ISBN 978-0080355474
- Strategic Air Power in Desert Storm by John Andreas Olsen (London, Routledge, 2003) ISBN 978-0714651934
- Free Trade Doesn't Work by Ian Fletcher (U.S. Business & Industry Council, 2010; revised edition in 2011) ISBN 978-0578079677
- La Repubblica dei mandarini. Viaggio nell'Italia della burocrazia, delle tasse e delle leggi inutili (The Republic of mandarins. Travel in the Italy of bureaucracy, taxes and unnecessary laws) by Paolo Bracalini (Padua, Marsilio, 2014) ISBN 978-8831716758

=== Selected book reviews ===
Luttwak has written book reviews for publications such as The American Spectator, Commentary Magazine, London Review of Books, The New Republic, and The New York Times.

- "With the Boring Parts Left Out". The New York Times. March 23, 1986.
- Redcliffe Salaman (March 1989). Books You May Have Missed: The History and Social Influence of the Potato. The American Spectator.
- Rodric Braithwaite (January 2007). "Moscow 1941". Commentary Magazine.
- "The Best and the Fastest". The New Republic. August 30, 2009.
- "A Damned Nice Thing". London Review of Books. December 18, 2014. pp. 15–16.

=== Selected articles ===
- "Why Fascism is the Wave of the Future". London Review of Books. April 1994.
- "Give War a Chance". Foreign Affairs. July 1999.
- "Iraq: The Logic of Disengagement" (PDF). Foreign Affairs. January 2005.
- "The Middle of Nowhere". Prospect. May 2007.
- "Why China Will Not Become the Next Global Power… But It Could”. Infinity Journal, Fall 2011
- "It's time to send Nato troops to Ukraine". UnHerd. April 4, 2024.
