= Institute for Human Security =

Coordinates: 42°24′28″N 71°07′18″W

The Henry J. Leir Institute for Migration and Human Security
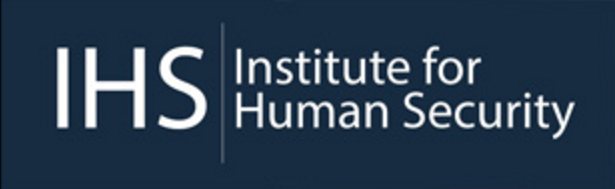
- Abbreviation: IHS
- Formation: 2001
- Type: Academic organization
- Purpose: Research and education at the intersection between humanitarianism, development, human rights, and conflict resolution
- Location: Medford, Massachusetts
- Fields: Human security
- Director: Katrina Burgess
- Parent organization: The Fletcher School of Law and Diplomacy, Tufts University
- Affiliations: PRAXIS: The Fletcher Journal of Human Security
- Website: fletcher.tufts.edu/Human-Security

The Henry J. Leir Institute for Migration and Human Security (formally the Henry J. Leir Institute for Human Security), founded in 2001, is an interdisciplinary education and research organization within The Fletcher School of Law and Diplomacy, at Tufts University. The Leir Institute's mission is to help policymakers and practitioners develop more equitable and sustainable responses to migration and its root causes by employing a human security approach. Leir's research and education also intersect with humanitarianism, development, human rights, and conflict resolution, and the Institute is recognized as a leading academic institution in its field.

== Activities ==
In pursuit of its mission, Leir’s work has three pillars: 1) connecting experts on migration with experts on drivers of migration, such as conflict, violence, social exclusion, governance failures, and climate change; 2) training policymakers and practitioners to bring a human security lens to migration issues; and, 3) partnering with local NGOs and governments to conduct applied research using innovative human security methodologies. Leir brings together specialists in law, politics, public health, psychology, business, development, and financial health to collaborate across disciplinary boundaries and innovate solutions to migration and its root causes. Leir also connects academia with professional practice through education, conferences, and fellowships.

== Programs ==
The Henry J. Leir Institute currently runs five research programs: the Corruption, Justice, and Legitimacy Program; Digital Portfolios of the Poor; Disrupted Mobilities; the Program in Human Security and Inner Development; Refugees in Towns; and The Journeys Project. Past programs include Building Resilience in Immigrant Communities, Building State Legitimacy, Conflict Resolution and Dialogue, the ICRC-Fletcher Joint Lab, Migration Crisis and State Fragility, Monitoring and Evaluation, and Transit Migration in the Americas.

=== Corruption, Justice, and Legitimacy (CJL) ===
Corruption, Justice, and Legitimacy (CJL) is a research-to-practice project with the goal of improving anti-corruption programming in places with endemic corruption. CJL works with policymakers, academics, and practitioners to break down the barriers to development caused by corruption. Corruption analysis traditionally focuses on assessing the risk and degree of corruption without evaluating the drivers and enablers of corrupt behavior. CJL’s early work developed and tested an alternate method of corruption analysis in Uganda, the Central African Republic, and the Democratic Republic of Congo.

=== Digital Portfolios of the Poor (DPP) ===
Digital Portfolios of the Poor (DPP) seeks to uncover the gendered differences in how the poor use (or don’t use) digital financial services in order to create gender-transformative digital products. To this end, DPP uses an innovative methodology to collect qualitative voice recording data from respondents in India, Kenya, Nigeria and Pakistan through Interactive Voice Recording (IVR) calls and analyzes that data using Natural Language Processing (NLP) and speech signal extraction. DPP is funded by the Bill & Melinda Gates Foundation and managed by Decodis, a social research firm founded by Leir Senior Fellow Dr. Daryl Collins, in partnership with the Leir Institute.

=== Disrupted Mobilities ===
Disrupted Mobilities is a multimedia project inspired by the Leir-sponsored 2019 documentary, Waylaid in Tijuana, that currently explores: the intersecting effects of blocked asylum, deportation, and restricted cross-border movement in communities along the U.S.-Mexico border; and, how migrants journeying through Central America and Mexico assess risk and process information regarding entry into the United States. The project, led by Leir Director Dr. Katrina Burgess and Leir Senior Fellow Dr. Kim Howe, uses an innovative trauma-informed methodology.

=== The Journeys Project ===
The Journeys Project is a cross-regional collection of migrant stories to better understand the costs and strategies involved in their journeys as well as the economic approaches they use when putting down roots in new surroundings. Founded in 2016, Journeys Project researchers have engaged in focused, in-depth field research in the Americas, Africa, Europe, and the Middle East. We examine migration from the perspectives of migrants and refugees themselves, charting their experiences from the moment they consider embarking on a journey to the moment they begin to feel settled in their new surroundings. Journeys has previously partnered with MercyCorps, the International Rescue Committee, GIZ, Katholische Universität Eichstätt-Ingolstadt, and SOAS. Kim Wilson founded and directs the Journeys Project.

=== The Program in Human Security and Inner Development Goals (PHUSID) ===
The Program in Human Security and Inner Development Goals (PHUSID) a skills-building initiative based on the Inner Development Goals (IDGs) to better prepare students to work effectively and sustainably in violent or fragile contexts. The Leir Institute is a designated IDG Hub. PHUSID is based on the Inner Development Goals developed by the Ekskäret Foundation in 2020 as a complement to the United Nations Sustainable Development Goals. Inner Development focuses on improving the self to become an effective and sustainable human security professional.

=== Refugees In Towns (RIT) ===
The Refugees in Towns (RIT) project publishes case studies authored by refugees, migrants, and hosts about the challenges and opportunities posed by integration. The project provides a platform for refugees to tell their own stories in their own words, providing an oft-missing local lens. RIT also conducts research in collaboration with practitioners, including the International Rescue Committee, Save the Children, Jesuit Refugee Service, and the Hello Neighbor Network. It also hosts an annual Integration Conference and Arts Festival. Dr. Karen Jacobsen, the Henry J. Leir Professor in Global Migration, founded and directs the RIT project.

== History ==
The Institute for Human Security (IHS) was founded in 2000 as a response to rapid global change following the collapse of the Soviet Union and the end of the Cold War. General John Galvin, Dean of The Fletcher School from 1995-2000, and Leir Charitable Foundations were two of the Institute’s foundational supporters. IHS was inaugurated to strengthen Fletcher’s impact on eradicating extreme misery, oppression, and violence and involved faculty working at the intersection of humanitarianism, development, human rights, and conflict resolution. IHS was one of the earliest institutions advocating for human security as a field of study and producing academic literature on the subject.

Dr. Peter Uvin, the Henry J. Leir Professor of International Humanitarian Studies at The Fletcher School at the time, was the Institute’s first director. (https://sites.tufts.edu/ihs/history/) Uvin’s research focused on violence, governance, and development in the African Great Lakes region. In 2014, Uvin was succeeded by Dr. Eileen Babbitt, Professor of Practice of International Conflict Management at The Fletcher School. as the Director of the Institute. Dr. Babbitt is also a Faculty Associate of the Program on Negotiation at the Harvard Law School and a member of the Council on Foreign Relations. Before joining Fletcher, Dr. Babbitt was the Director of Education and Training at the United States Institute of Peace in Washington, D.C, and the Deputy Director of Harvard's Program on International Conflict Analysis and Resolution. She has worked as a trainer and facilitator for conflict resolution projects in the Balkans and the Middle East.

In 2014, the Carnegie Corporation of New York awarded the Leir Institute a $1 million grant to connect academics and policymakers and help professors influence policy, as part of the Corporation's “Rigor and Relevance Initiative.” Leir was awarded funds to develop novel, feasible ways to bridge the gap between academics and policymakers working on the same complex foreign policy issues. Leir dedicated grant resources to developing and communicating strategies to enhance the legitimacy of fragile states across political, economic, justice and security sectors. One of the projects undertaken with the support of the Carnegie grant was the Corruption, Justice, and Legitimacy project, which advances systems approaches to corruption analysis in fragile and conflict-affected contexts.

In 2015 the Henry J. Leir Human Security Award was established. The inaugural award was given to Maria J. Stephan for scholarship in civil Resistance and nonviolent conflict. In 2017 the Institute was renamed the Henry J. Leir Institute for Human Security, and in 2020 Dr. Katrina Burgess, Associate Professor of Political Economy, succeeded Dr. Babbitt as Director of the Leir Institute. In 2021, Leir underwent a strategic positioning process and rebranded as the Henry J. Leir Institute for Migration and Human Security. Leir’s new focus is the intersection of migration and human security and the Institute now seeks to generate innovative research to address migration and its root causes.

== Partnerships and collaboration ==
The Leir Institute leverages the multi-disciplinary expertise at Fletcher and at Tufts through partnerships with the International Security Studies Program, the World Peace Foundation, and the Institute for Business in the Global Context. Leir also partners with the Feinstein International Center at the Friedman School of Nutrition Science and Policy. (https://sites.tufts.edu/ihs/about/)

In the past, Leir closely collaborated with the Center for Human Rights and Conflict Resolution (CHRCR) at The Fletcher School. CHRCR was later renamed the Program for Human Rights and Conflict Resolution (PHRCR) and finally merged with the Leir Institute.

== Publications ==
The Leir Institute and affiliated faculty and students contribute significantly to scholarship on migration and human security approaches. Leir has three main channels of publication: Research Publications, the Leir Migration Monitor, and the Praxis Journal.

=== Research Publications ===
Leir publishes findings from its many research projects, including the Corruption, Justice, and Legitimacy Program; Digital Portfolios of the Poor; the Program in Human Security and Inner Development; Refugees in Towns; and The Journeys Project. Recent publications include:

- The Intersectional Nature of Social Norms: So Much More to Learn, Diana Chigas, Co-Director, CJL and Cheyanne Scharbatke-Church, Co-Director, CJL
- Senior Fellow Spotlight: Samer Saliba
- Financial Biographies of Migrans in Colombia, Marisol Hernandez, Heather Odell, Shane Sullivan, and Rosemary Ventura under the supervision of Kim Wilson
- Financial Archetypes and How to Use Them, Marisol Hernandez, Heather Odell, Shane Sullivan, and Rosemary Ventura under the supervision of Kim Wilson
- Race and Refugees: How Refugees Learn About Race in America, Yumeka Kawahara, Lucy Mastellar, Sarah Rose Morehouse, Charlie Williams, Dr. Karen Jacobsen

=== Leir Migration Monitor ===
Launched in 2022 as part of the Institute’s rebrand, the Leir Migration Monitor is a monthly newsletter featuring analysis and research from Leir’s people and programs.

=== PRAXIS Journal ===
PRAXIS: The Fletcher Journal of Human Security, was founded in 1981 as the Fletcher School Journal of Development Studies. In 2007, the journal was renamed the Fletcher Journal of Human Security. Praxis is a student-run journal published annually in coordination with the Leir Institute. The journal publishes student work at the intersection of humanitarianism, development, human rights, and conflict resolution.
