= 3.5% rule =

Concept in political science

The 3.5% rule is a concept in political science that states that when 3.5% of the population of a country protest nonviolently against an authoritarian government, that government is likely to fall from power. The rule was formulated by Erica Chenoweth in 2013. It arose out of insights originally published by political scientist Mark Lichbach in 1995 in his book The Rebel's Dilemma: Economics, Cognition, and Society. Other scholars have criticized the dataset used to construct these findings for being too narrow in scope, though that dataset has been expanded since the rule's original formulation.

== Formulation ==
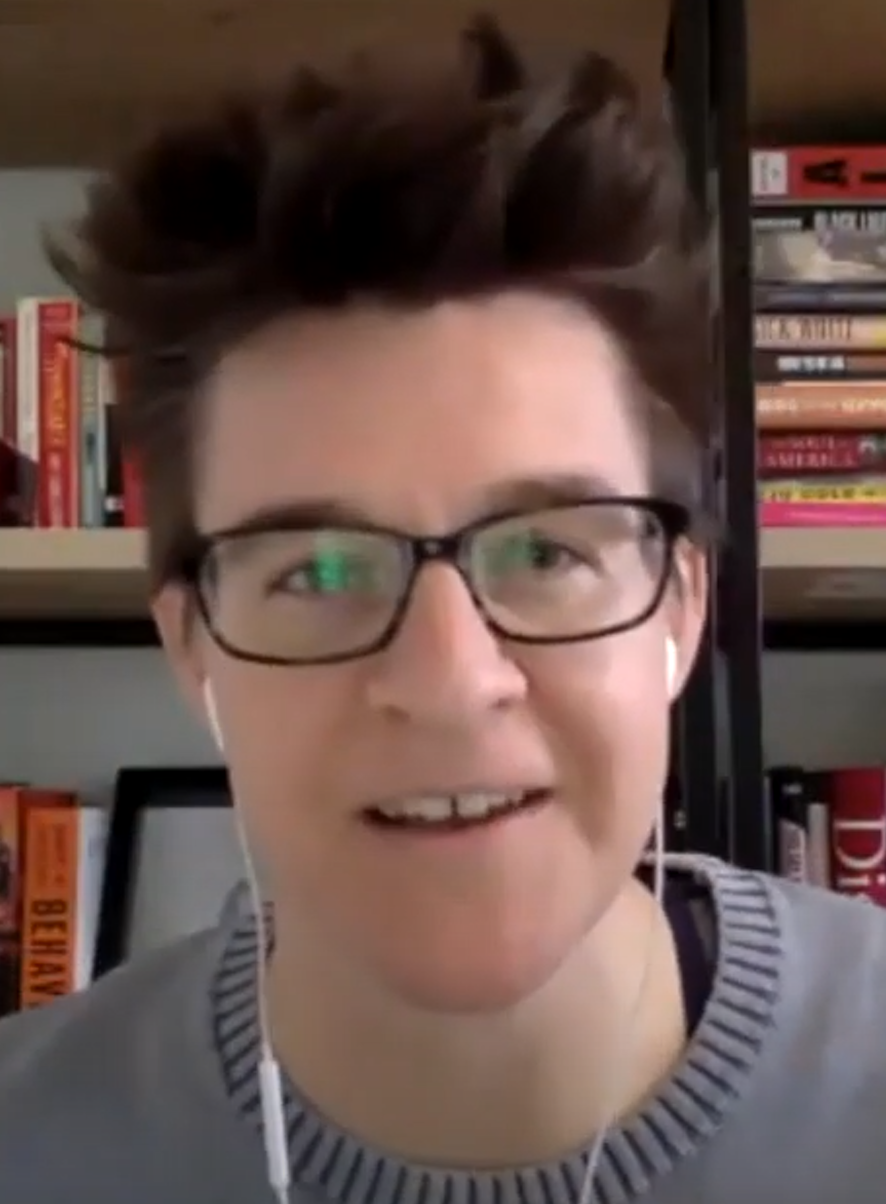
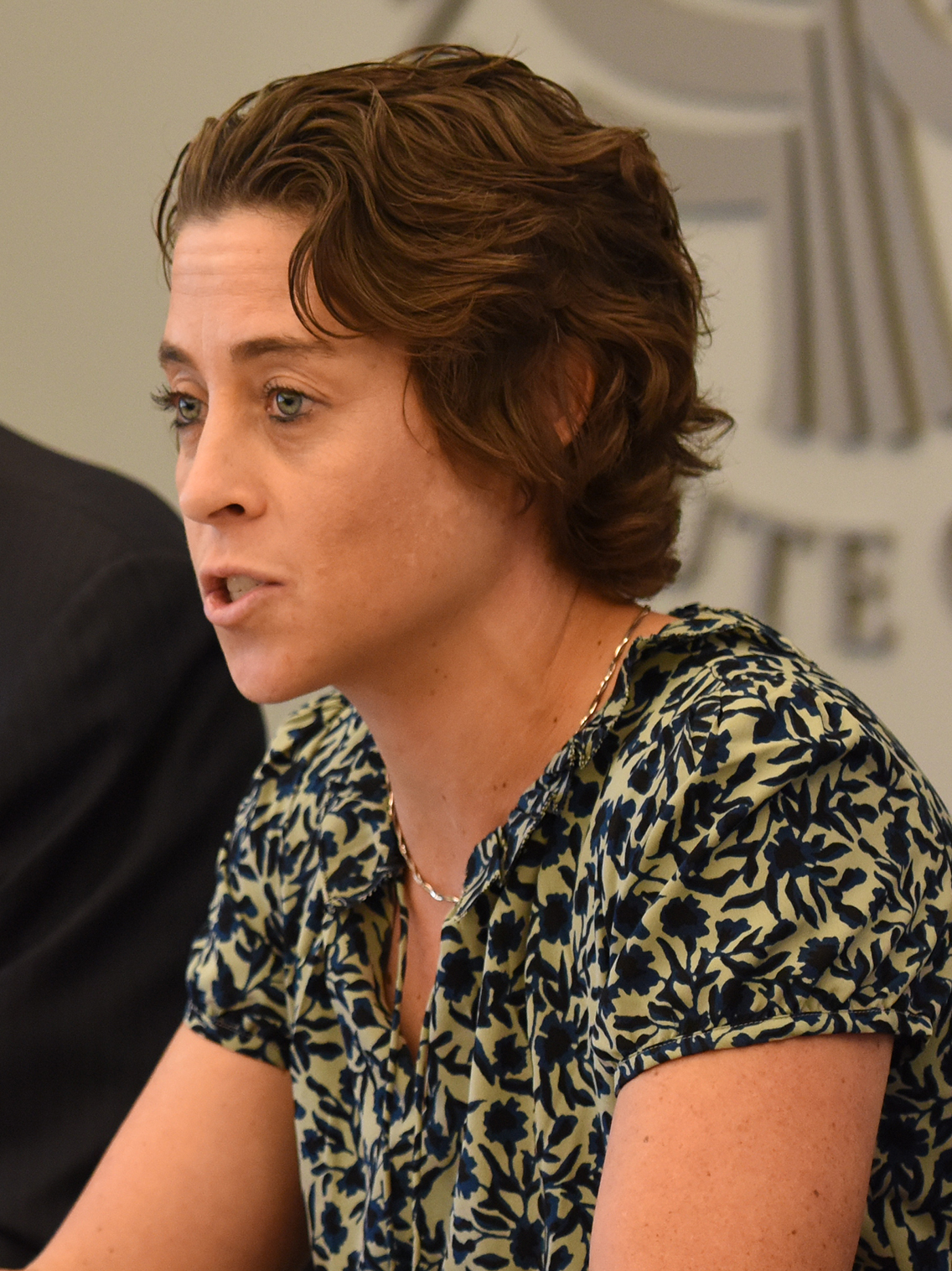
Erica Chenoweth and Maria Stephan

Chenoweth and Maria Stephan studied the success rates of civil resistance efforts from 1900 to 2006, focusing on the major violent and nonviolent efforts to bring about regime change during that time. To be classified as successful, a movement had to achieve its aims within one year of peak turnout, and had to satisfy strict criteria for nonviolence. By comparing the success rates of 323 violent and nonviolent campaigns, Stephan and Chenoweth demonstrated that only 26% of violent revolts were successful, whereas 53% of nonviolent campaigns were successful.

They found that nonviolent movements attracted four times as many participants as violent movements, on average, meaning that 20 of the 25 largest movements they studied were nonviolent. They also demonstrated that nonviolent movements tended to precede the development of more democratic regimes than did violent movements.

Chenoweth coined a rule about the level of participation necessary for a movement to succeed, calling it the "3.5% rule", based on findings originally discussed by Mark Lichbach in his 1995 book The Rebel's Dilemma: Economics, Cognition, and Society. Lichbach proposed that 5% of the population could topple a government, and that no opposition movement could ever hope to surpass that number due to the free-rider problem. In 2013, Chenoweth revisited Lichbach's proposal using the Nonviolent and Violent Campaigns and Outcomes (NAVCO) 1.1 dataset. Chenoweth found that nearly every movement in the dataset with active participation from at least 3.5% of the population succeeded. All of the campaigns that achieved the 3.5% threshold were nonviolent.

Chenoweth has noted that nonviolent campaigns attract participation from larger numbers of people than violent ones, in part because they have fewer requirements for physical ability or weapons, which in turn results in a greater likelihood of gaining political success. Chenoweth has cautioned that the rule should be viewed as a "rule of thumb" rather than as a hard-and-fast law, since it is a descriptive rather than a prescriptive theory which omits other important factors such as momentum, organization, and strategic leadership.

Subsequently, Chenoweth has observed that both nonviolent and armed resistance have been decreasing in efficacy since 2010, concluding that this is the result of authoritarian regimes learning from history, coordinating with one another, and training their armies and police to discourage defections within their ranks. Consequently, Chenoweth has advised that civil resistance movements take these changes into account and alter their tactics accordingly.

Among the successful campaigns cited by Chenoweth as fitting with the 3.5% rule are the Cedar Revolution, the Singing Revolution, some of the 2012–2013 Egyptian protests, the fall of communism in Albania, the 2019–2022 Sudanese protests, the Velvet Revolution, and the Rose Revolution.

== In protests ==
The 3.5% rule has been cited as a goal by activists in the climate movement, who have argued that if this many people join the movement, change will follow. The Economist writes in an editorial that such a level of participation is currently very far from having been achieved.

In 2025, the 3.5% rule became prominent in protests against Donald Trump, including those concerning US immigration policy. Members of the 50501 movement organized the Hands Off protests of April 5, 2025, issuing a statement that said, in part: "April 5 was our fourth national day of action, and it won't be our last. We are committed to building our peaceful People's Movement and achieving 3.5% participation. History shows that when just 3.5% of the population engages in sustained peaceful resistance – transformative change is inevitable." A crowdsourcing effort by data journalists that tallied attendance at the June 2025 No Kings protests estimated total attendance in the range of 4–6 million people, or roughly 1.2–1.8% of the US population. The October 2025 No Kings protests had nearly 7 million participants, or approximately 2% of the US population.

== Appraisals ==
Ron Pagnucco writes approvingly of the research underlying the rule, while also pointing out that "such large protests also may strengthen the hand of elite reformers in relation to hardliners in an authoritarian [regime]", rather than simply contributing to declining support for the rulers.

Kyle R. Matthews argues that Extinction Rebellion has misused the research, because "Chenoweth and Stephan's data relates to state-wide systemic change, mainly overthrowing autocratic governments, and does not apply to change in liberal democratic states."

Richard Seifman, formerly of the World Bank, notes that nonviolent protests in Brunei and Bahrain attracted more than 3.5% of the population, but failed to achieve regime change. Chenoweth, however, has pointed out that Brunei and Bahrain were small monarchies whose ruling powers were backed by powerful external allies (Britain for Brunei, Saudi Arabia for Bahrain), noting also that although participation size is associated with a movement's success, there have been nonviolent movements that have achieved their goals without reaching the 3.5% support threshold. Seifman also observes that coalition-building and the use of social media are essential to a successful movement, while misinformation is likely to work against it.

Eric Shuman and collaborators argue that violent movements can also be effective, and that many nonviolent movements include pockets of violent activities.

Alexei Anisin criticized the NAVCO dataset, writing that it omits failed nonviolent uprisings as well as successful violent revolutions. He points out that the NAVCO study makes errors in its classification, ignoring unarmed violent resistance, such as the usage of sticks, stones, and burning cars, that has been pivotal to the success of some revolutions. Chenoweth and Christopher Wiley Shay have made successive updates to the NAVCO 1.0 series (most recently with 1.3) in order to widen the data set and correct other errors.

== See also ==
- List of protests in the 21st century
- Median voter theorem
- Three Percenters
