= Henry J. Leir =

American industrialist and financier (1900–1998)

- Born: Heinrich Hans Leipziger; January 28, 1900; Beuthen, Germany
- Died: July 25, 1998 (aged 98); Manhattan, New York, U.S.
- Occupations: Philanthropist, industrialist
- Organization: Leir Foundation
- Notable work: La Grande Compagnie de Colonisation: Documents of a New Plan
- Spouse: Erna Leir

Henry J. Leir (January 28, 1900 – July 15, 1998) was an American industrialist, financier, and philanthropist. He is primarily known for his role in the post-World War II economic development of Luxembourg.

== Early life and career ==
Leir was born Heinrich Hans Leipziger to a Jewish family in Beuthen-Roßberg, Prussian Silesia. His father died in 1911, leaving his mother alone to raise a large family that included, in addition to himself, an older brother and five sisters. Leipziger was therefore obligated to contribute very early in life to the material livelihood of his family.

In 1919, Leipziger moved to Mannheim to join the Ludwigshafen branch of the large steel firm Wolf Netter & Jacobi, where he remained until 1931. He then moved to Bonn with his wife Erna, whom he had married in 1929, to head the firm Magnesit GmbH, a manufacturer of refractories. In 1933 after being degraded by the Nazis to assistant, he resigned and the couple moved to Luxembourg, where Leipziger founded the Société Anonyme des Minerais. This company was to become the foundation of his business empire.

== Utopian fiction ==
In August 1937, Leipziger completed a utopian science fiction novel, mostly in German, entitled La Grande Compagnie de Colonisation: Dokumente eines Grossen Planes. It was published under the pseudonym "Tom Palmer" by the hitherto unknown publisher Malpartes-Verlag Evy Friedrich of Luxembourg. Written in the form of a collection of fictional meeting minutes, press releases, private letters, telegrams and newspaper clippings, the book tells the story of a corporation based in Luxembourg, chartered with the purpose of developing all unused and unpopulated regions in the world. The company eventually succeeds in its goal, overcoming various forms of nationalist opposition to accomplish massive works: irrigating deserts, closing the Straits of Gibraltar and the Bosporus, building a canal through Nicaragua, tunneling under the English Channel, developing the mineral resources of South America and creating arable land in China. Contemporary reviewers of the work detected the influence of the murdered German industrialist Walther Rathenau, who had published his own utopian vision Was wird werden in 1920.

== Between the USA and Luxembourg ==
The year 1939 was especially eventful for Leipziger, who adopted his new name "Henry J. Leir" about this time. Since his arrival in Luxembourg in 1933, Leir had become a close financial advisor to the House of Nassau-Weilburg, the rulers of the duchy since 1890. On the occasion of the 100th anniversary of the independence of Luxembourg, Leir was invested by Charlotte, Grand Duchess of Luxembourg as Grand Officier de l'Ordre Grand-Ducal de la Couronne de Chêne. Shortly thereafter, in December 1939, Leir fled to New York City, where he was immediately granted a US passport and founded the Continental Ore Company. During the decades that followed, Leir forged a close relationship between the royal court of Luxembourg and Franklin Delano Roosevelt, who traced his ancestry to Luxembourg through his mother Sara Delano. Over the decades following World War II, Leir built upon these personal, bi-national relationships to attract several major American corporations to Luxembourg, among them Goodyear, DuPont, Monsanto Company, Wells Fargo and Bank of America.

In 1963 Armand Hammer's Occidental Petroleum acquired Leir's company Interore SA, a phosphate mining and chemical trading multinational with operations in twenty-seven countries. Hammer's autobiography describes the meetings with Leir that led to this transaction but included unflattering personal details about Leir that Leir later disputed. Another famous business associate of Leir's was Joseph Alioto, who served as legal counsel for Leir's business interests before becoming mayor of San Francisco in 1968.

== Philanthropy ==
Leir and his wife Erna supported several philanthropic causes through their Ridgefield Foundation (named after Ridgefield, Connecticut, one of their three home towns) and the Leir Foundation in Luxembourg. Among their donations were the endowments of several university chairs including the Henry J. Leir Professor at Clark University, the Henry J. Leir Professor of International Humanitarian Studies at the Fletcher School of Law and Diplomacy of Tufts University, the Leir Professor of International Trade and Business at the New Jersey Institute of Technology, the Henry J. Leir Professorial Chair at the Weizmann Institute in Israel and the Henry J. Leir Professor of Neurodegenerative Diseases at the Hebrew University of Jerusalem. Also the Fletcher School renamed its institute to Henry J. Leir Institute for Human Security, and also established the Henry J. Leir Human Security Award.

Prior to his death, Leir created the Leir House, a charitable organization dedicated to programs for disadvantaged children as well as scientific and education conferences. After Leir died in 1998, the Leir Charitable Foundations carried on his humanitarian vision for world prosperity and peace.

== Death ==
Leir died in July 1998, in Manhattan, NY.

== Works ==
- Tom Palmer (1981). La Grande Compagnie de Colonisation: Documents of a New Plan. Worcester (USA): Clark University Press. ISBN 0-914206-20-6.
