= Coup d'État: A Practical Handbook =

1968 book by Edward Luttwak

- Author: Edward Luttwak
- Language: English
- Publication date: 1968
- Publication place: United States

Coup d'État: A Practical Handbook (1968), by Edward Luttwak, is a book of political science that examines the conditions and strategy, planning and execution of coups d'état. In 2016, the revised edition of Coup d’État: A Practical Handbook was published to include the application of twenty-first century technology in removing a government from power.

== Key ideas ==
In Coup d’État: A Practical Handbook, Luttwak discusses how to realize a coup d’état and its conceptual differences from a revolution. Unlike a revolution, a coup d’état is the rapid takeover of governmental mechanisms to realise a swift transition of government power by using “parts of the state apparatus to seize the controlling levers over the rest” of the deposed state.

Not every country is suitable for a coup. Luttwak outlines several conditions that must be met for a coup to be feasible:

1. The economic situation must be poor, creating unrest among the population.
2. Power must be concentrated in the hands of a single party or a small ruling elite.
3. The state must have political independence, free from external influences that could intervene and seize control after the coup.
4. The country must be sufficiently organized, with a structured bureaucracy that can be taken over efficiently.

The key to a successful coup, according to Luttwak, is flexibility. Revolutionary forces must be adept at exploiting events to their advantage and swiftly seizing control of government institutions. The primary focus at the onset of a coup is the rapid neutralization of the armed forces loyal to the previous regime, like he wrote: "maximum speed in the transitional phase, and the need to fully neutralize the opposition both before and immediately after the coup". Luttwak suggests that revolutionaries operate in parallel teams targeting three main objectives:

1. "Heavily secured facilities with strict access control" — such as the palace, military headquarters, and police command centers. These are both strategic military and symbolic targets that grant revolutionaries physical control. Rather than engaging in excessive bloodshed, the revolutionaries should infiltrate these institutions from within and seize them.
2. Communication centers — Luttwak emphasizes the need to disable government technicians and broadcasting capabilities to prevent propaganda and coordination among loyalist forces.
3. Key figures in the current government — who must be swiftly neutralized by small, covert teams just before the coup officially begins.

"A coup consists”, as Luttwak describes, “of the infiltration of a small but critical segment of the state apparatus, which is then used to displace the government from its control of the remainder." He compares it to a swift transfer of control over a fast-moving machine — the revolutionaries replace the old regime without disrupting the functioning of the bureaucratic system. This ensures that the general population remains unaffected and does not resist the transition. Instead of forcing the coup upon the populace, revolutionaries must persuade them that their rule will improve the country, while simultaneously neutralizing vocal opponents of the coup.

== Critical response ==
In a 1980 review of the book, Richard Clutterbuck called Coup d'État: A Practical Handbook (1968) one of "only two general contemporary books on the subject" of military coups d'état that are worthwhile in content and readerly interest, the other being Samuel Finer's The Man on Horseback. However, Clutterbuck criticises the book for not further emphasising the role of the news media in determining the likely success of a coup d'état.

== References to the book ==
The book was reportedly studied by General Mohamed Oufkir, the ringleader of a failed plot to overthrow the Moroccan government, in 1972.

In 2006, Philippine President Gloria Macapagal Arroyo said the people's mass demonstration to force her to step down was what expert Edward Luttwak said in his Coup d'État: A Practical Handbook.

In 2013, during a period of turmoil in Egypt, Financial Times journalist Joseph Cotterill posted a chart on how to execute a coup, taken from Luttwak's book. The chart shows the three groups that the revolutionaries need in place, and the targets they need to seize, such as the residences of important personalities, TV stations, and then key traffic locations.

The 1978 thriller Power Play was based on the book. In the film, an idealistic military officer becomes sickened by the government's use of extrajudicial killing and torture to suppress the terrorism that their incompetence and corruption has fostered. He decides that for the good of the country he must attempt to overthrow the regime and end the chaos. Worried only about infiltration by agents of the hated internal security chief, who knows he can expect no mercy, the colonel leads the plot to success, but realises too late that he overlooked the danger of a clique within his coup's own forces, and finds himself facing a firing squad along with those he has deposed.

== See also ==
- Coup d'État: The Technique of Revolution, a study of the coup d'état by Curzio Malaparte, an Italian writer and statesman who participated in the March on Rome
