= Global Crime =

- Discipline: Criminology
- Language: English
- Edited by: Carlo Morselli

Publication details
- Former name(s): Transnational Organized Crime
- History: 1995-present
- Publisher: Routledge
- Frequency: Quarterly

Standard abbreviations
- ISO 4: Glob. Crime

Indexing
- ISSN: 1744-0572 (print); 1744-0580 (web)
- LCCN: 2016267020
- OCLC no.: 709958149
- Transnational Organized Crime
- ISSN: 1357-7387

Links
- Journal homepage; Online access; Online archive

Global Crime is a quarterly peer-reviewed academic journal covering the study of crime. It was established in 1995 as Transnational Organized Crime, obtaining its current name in 2004. It is published by Routledge and the editor-in-chief is Carlo Morselli (University of Montreal).

== Abstracting and indexing ==
The journal is abstracted and indexed in:

- British Humanities Index
- CSA databases
- Emerging Sources Citation Index
- International Bibliography of the Social Sciences
- Scopus
