= Arduino Paniccia =

Paniccia, Arduino
- Born: 31 January 1946 (age 80); Milan, Italy

Arduino Paniccia (Milan, 31 January 1946) is an Italian university professor, columnist, and writer, skilled on military strategy and geopolitics, and acknowledged expert at Italian and international level. Consultant of large private and public companies, he is member of the academic committees and working groups of the European Union and the UN. Through many missions in areas affected by conflicts, he gained extensive experience in the fields of terrorism, guerrilla warfare and peace-keeping. He is commentator and analyst for Italian newspapers, television and the web media on themes of geopolitics and international strategy, commentator for RAI UNO-mattina, LA7, SKY television news and radio news of RAI, Radio Swiss TV, Radio Vatican and Radio Koper. He writes for national and international newspapers and magazines (Panorama, Economy, Il Foglio, Formiche, Herald Tribune), and is frequently interviewed in major national Italian newspapers (La Stampa, Il Corriere, Il Sole 24 Ore, Il Giornale). He is founder and Chairman of ASCE, The School of Economic Warfare and International Competition in Venice, Italy.

== Biography ==
After completing his studies at the Trieste Nautical Institute, Paniccia embarks on a British merchant ship, later militarized, and participates in the Vietnam War, on board of logistic support units (1966–1967). He graduated in 1971 in Maritime Economic Sciences at the Naval University of Naples with a thesis on economics of sea and air transports.

Paniccia has been involved in numerous international missions in areas affected by conflict, as expert on issues such as terrorism, insurgency and peacekeeping. He has made numerous missions in Bosnia, Albania, Croatia, Kosovo, Macedonia and Serbia, as well as in Afghanistan, Pakistan, and the Persian Gulf region. He has taken part in peacekeeping missions in the Balkans, particularly in humanitarian aid operations in the winter of '93 / '94 in the besieged city of Sarajevo. He was member of the Task Force for Reconstruction of the Balkans and is President of the Task Force for the reconstruction of Libya. In 1981 appointed to the Board of Directors of the holding group for aircraft construction, transport and helicopter services AGUSTA SpA, since January 2001 he is Senior Advisor UNCTAD / UN, Geneva, for the project “Mediterranean 2000”, and in 2007, in charge of the UNIDO cooperation's mission for the area of Lebanon, Jordan, Iraq, he used to be responsible for the UNIDO training project for diplomatic and ministerial managers in Iraq. Colleague and friend of Edward Luttwak, with whom he has written essays on the strategies of globalization, he cooperates with the Center for Strategiorgac Studies in Washington. He is the author of monographs on the entry of China into the World Trade Organization, on the Management of the Network / ICANN and on the setting up of pan-European transport corridors. Since 2006 he is professor at the Inter-agency School of Police of the Italian Ministry of the Interior in Rome, at the course of transnational crime and terrorism. He founded in 2013, in Venice, the .

== Honors and diplomatic assignments ==
In February 1992 Paniccia awarded the Order of Merit of the Italian Republic, "Motu Proprio" by the President of the Republic Francesco Cossiga, for his service in the public companies in the maritime and aviation industries; with DPR27/12/94 he was honored with the title of Grand Officer of the Order of Merit of the Italian Republic; In April 1993 appointed Honorary Consul of Spain in Venice, North-East consular district; in 2002 appointed Economic Advisor for Foreign Trade of the Grand Duchy of Luxembourg (General Council); in November 2003 Knight of Magistral Grace of the Sovereign Military Order of Malta and Comm Captain of the Italian Army Military Corps. 1st Regiment Milan (to date)

== Publications ==
Among his publications there are: 1994 – "Strategy and Individual" – Muzio Editore, Padua (Introd. E. Luttwak); 1997 – "Two Italies and a half Europe" – Aegis, University of Padua (Introd. E. Luttwak); 2000 – "The New Commanders – Winning in the XXI Century" with Edward Luttwak – Marsilio / Rizzoli (5th edition); 2001 – "Reconstruction in Serbia and the Balkans: the Pan-European Transport Corridors" – EIC Editions / EU – Brussels; 2001 – "The European Union, China and the United States in the multilateral trading system: the World Trade Organization (WTO) after Seattle" – EIC Editions / EU – Venice; 2002 – G. Segre, G. Muraro, A. Paniccia – "Strategy and Globalization" in "Taxation and Business in the Global Marketplace" – Cedam – Padova; 2006 – "The Fourth Age" – Publisher Mazzanti, Notebooks for Strategic Studies; 2008 – "The armed peace. The role of Italy in the new strategic doctrine for the Mediterranean" coauthors General CC L. Leso and Andrea Castelli Cossiga – Mazzanti Editori, Notebooks of Military and Strategic Studies. 2013 – "Reshaping the future. handbook for a new strategy", Mazzanti Editori, Venice.
