= Erica Chenoweth =

American political scientist (born 1980)

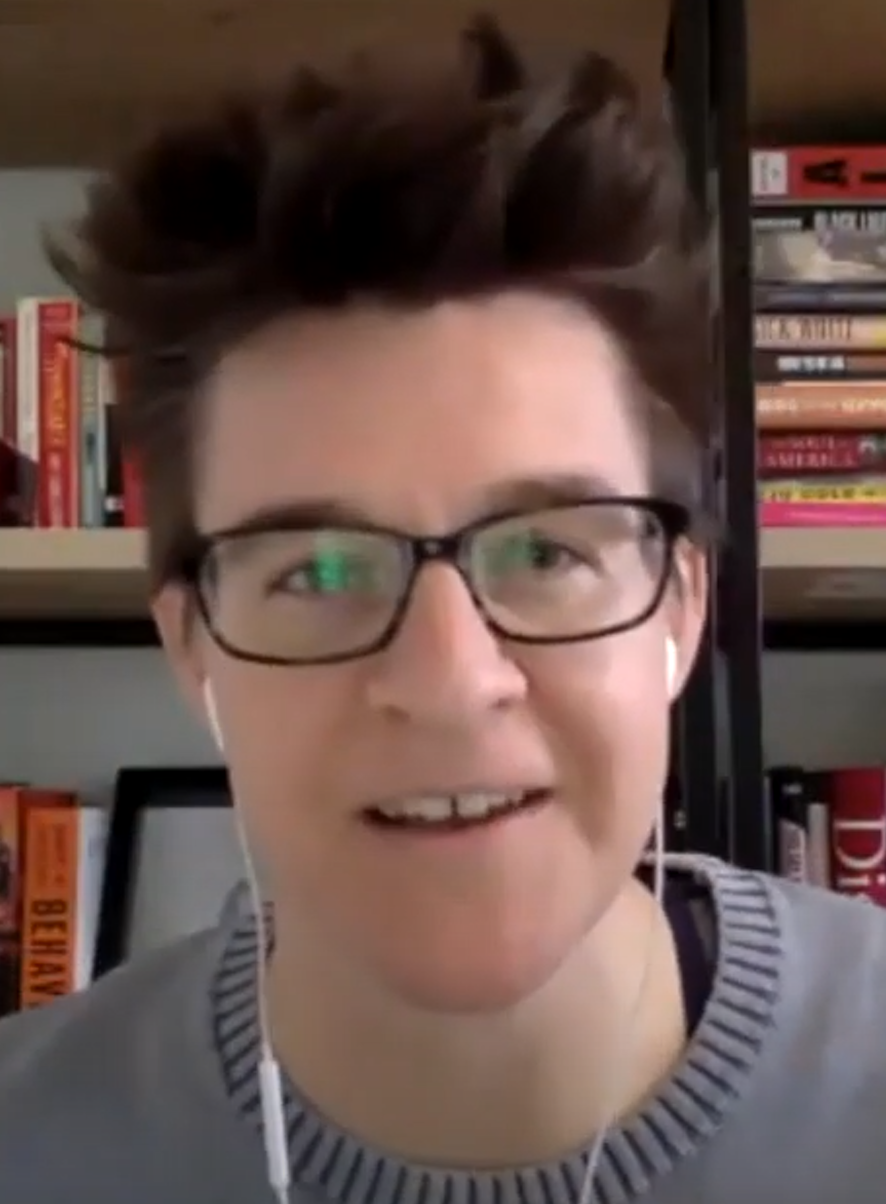
- Chenoweth in 2020
- Born: April 22, 1980 (age 46)
- Education: University of Dayton (BA); University of Colorado Boulder (MA, PhD)
- Known for: Civil resistance studies
- Scientific career
- Fields: International relations Political science
- Workplaces: John F. Kennedy School of Government; Radcliffe Institute for Advanced Study; Josef Korbel School of International Studies (University of Denver) (2012–2018); Wesleyan University (2008–2012)

Erica Chenoweth (born April 22, 1980) is an American political scientist and professor of public policy at the John F. Kennedy School of Government and the Radcliffe Institute for Advanced Study. They are known for their research work on nonviolent civil resistance movements.

== Education ==
Chenoweth received their Bachelor of Arts at the University of Dayton, followed by a Master of Arts and a Ph.D. from the University of Colorado at Boulder. They previously taught at Wesleyan University until 2012 and completed postdoctoral fellowships at Harvard University and the University of Maryland. Chenoweth joined the University of Denver faculty in 2012 and the Harvard faculty in 2018.

== Career ==
Between 2012 and 2018, Chenoweth was a professor at the University of Denver. They were a faculty member and PhD program co-director at the Josef Korbel School of International Studies. They also directed the university's Program on Terrorism and Insurgency Research. They were also a researcher at the Peace Research Institute Oslo (PRIO).

Since 2018, Chenoweth has been a professor of public policy at the John F. Kennedy School of Government and the Radcliffe Institute for Advanced Study of Harvard University.

In 2023, Chenoweth became the first openly non-binary faculty dean at Harvard University.

== Work ==
External videos
- "Erica Chenoweth - Why Civil Resistance Works: Nonviolence in the Past and Future", Dartmouth College

Together with Maria J. Stephan, who was then at the U.S. Department of State, Chenoweth co-wrote the book Why Civil Resistance Works. Chenoweth and Stephan organized an international team of scholars in identifying all the major violent and nonviolent governmental change efforts of the twentieth century. They translated the results into a theory of civil resistance and its success rate for political change compared to violent resistance.

Their team compared over 200 violent revolutions and over 100 nonviolent campaigns. Their data shows that 26% of the violent revolutions were successful, while 53% of the nonviolent campaigns succeeded. Moreover, looking at change in democracy (Polity IV scores) suggest that nonviolence promotes democracy while violence promotes tyranny.

Chenoweth coined the "3.5% rule" to describe the fact that in the research data set, every campaign that got active participation from at least 3.5 percent of the population succeeded, and many succeeded with less. All the campaigns that achieved that threshold were nonviolent; no violent campaign achieved that threshold.

Their research work on nonviolent civil resistance inspired the movement Extinction Rebellion.

In their 2020 essay, The Future of Nonviolent Resistance, Chenoweth argued that nonviolent protest movements in the 2010s were more common than in previous decades but statistically showed less effectiveness compared to earlier movements. Chenoweth listed the four factors of successful movements that they judged to have been less common in the 2010s movements as: "careful planning, organization, training, and coalition-building prior to mass mobilization" as opposed to protests occurring first; momentum in "grow[ing] in size and diversity" and using techniques such as strikes and civil disobedience; inclusion of a non-internet component to organising; and "strategies for maintaining unity and discipline" in rejecting the use of violent tactics. Their point of view was optimistic about the future of protest movements, stating that protests during the COVID-19 pandemic were "updating and renewing the outdated playbook" of "rely[ing] exclusively on protest" and instead "building resilient coalitions with a greater capacity for bringing about lasting transformation."

As of January 2025, Chenoweth serves as director of the Nonviolent Action Lab at Harvard's Ash Center for Democratic Governance and Innovation.

In 2017 Chenoweth cofounded, with Jeremy Pressman, the Crowd Counting Consortium. The Crowd Counting Consortium was created after Chenoweth and their colleagues noticed an interest in documenting crowds, such as protests or other movements.

== Awards ==
In 2012, Why Civil Resistance Works won the American Political Science Association's Woodrow Wilson Foundation Award for "the best book published in the U.S. during the previous calendar year on government, politics, or international affairs."

Chenoweth, along with Stephan, also won the 2013 University of Louisville Grawemeyer Award for Ideas for Improving the World Order. Past winners of this award include Mikhail Gorbachev and Robert Keohane.

In December 2013, Foreign Policy named Chenoweth one of the Top 100 Global Thinkers of the year "for proving Gandhi right," noting their work on providing evidence for the efficacy of nonviolent political movements. In 2013, Erica also won the Karl Deutsch Award (International Relations) for being "judged to have made the most significant contribution to the study of International Relations and Peace Research by the means of publication."

Chenoweth was also awarded the International Studies Association award for "Best Group Blog of the Year" for the blog Violence @ a Glance, which they founded with Barbara F. Walter.

== Publications ==
=== Books ===
- Civil Resistance: What Everyone Needs to Know. N.Y.: Oxford University Press, 2021.
- Rethinking Violence: States and Non-State Actors in Conflict (2010)
- Chenoweth, Erica; Stephan, Maria J. (2011), Why Civil Resistance Works: The Strategic Logic of Nonviolent Conflict, Columbia U. Pr., ISBN 978-0-231-15683-7.
- On Revolutions: Unruly Politics in the Contemporary World (2022)

=== Articles ===
- The resistance reaches into Trump country, Waging Nonviolence, October 16, 2025 (co-authored with Soha Hammam, Jeremy Pressman, and Christopher Wiley Shay)
- American Spring? How nonviolent protest in the US is accelerating, Waging Nonviolence, June 12, 2025 (co-authored with Soha Hammam, Jeremy Pressman, and Christopher Wiley Shay)
- The resistance is alive and well – and our research shows it, The Guardian, March 28, 2025 (co-authored with Jeremy Pressman and Soha Hammam)
- Protests in the United States on Palestine and Israel, 2023–2024, Social Movement Studies, 2024 (co-authored with Soha Hammam, Jeremy Pressman, and Jay Ulfelder)
- Protests under Trump, 2017–2021, Mobilization, 2022 (co-authored with Jeremy Pressman, Tommy Leung, L. Nathan Perkins, and Jay Ulfelder)
- The Death and Life of Terrorist Networks, Foreign Affairs, October 5, 2020 (co-authored with Christopher Blair, Michael C. Horowitz, Evan Perkoski, and Philip B. K. Potter)
- This is what we learned by counting the women’s marches, Washington Post, February 7, 2017 (co-authored with Jeremy Pressman)

Ukrainian translation:

- Ченовет, Еріка; Стефан, Марія Дж. (2014), Чому ненасильницький спротив ефективний. Стратегічна логіка громадянського конфлікту, Видавництво "Кліо", ISBN 978-617-7023-14-1.
- Chenoweth, Erica, NAVCO Data Project, Sié Chéou-Kang Center for International Security & Diplomacy, Josef Korbel School of International Studies, University of Denver
