= Shehadi =

Shehadi is a surname. Notable people with the surname include:

- Freddi Shehadi, American guitarist, composer, singer-songwriter
- Lauren Shehadi (born 1983), American sportscaster
- Nadim Shehadi (born 1956), faculty member
