= Kelly Sims Gallagher =

American international affairs scholar (born 1973)

- Born: Kelly Megan Sims; August 21, 1973 (age 53); Denver, Colorado, U.S.
- Title: Professor and Dean, The Fletcher School; Director, Center for International Environment & Resource Policy
- Spouse: Kevin P. Gallagher (m. 2001)
- Children: 2

Academic background
- Education: Occidental College (AB); Tufts University (MALD, PhD)
- Thesis: Foreign Direct Investment as a Vehicle for Deploying Cleaner Technologies
- Doctoral advisor: William R. Moomaw

Academic work
- Discipline: Energy policy; environmental policy
- Institutions: Harvard University; Tufts University

Kelly Sims Gallagher is a professor of energy and environmental policy and Dean of the Fletcher School at Tufts University. Gallagher was appointed the dean in 2024, and retains her appointments as director of the Center for International Environment & Resource Policy and the Climate Policy Lab at Tufts. Her research focuses on energy technology and climate policy across the United States and China.

== Personal life and education ==
Born in Denver, Colorado, on August 21, 1973, Kelly Megan Sims was raised in Evergreen. During her upbringing she "took a clean and natural environment for granted" until moving to Los Angeles, California to attend Occidental College. There, she suffered from pneumonia due to air pollution, which led her to complete a second major in environmental studies.

Sims married Kevin Paul Gallagher in the Goddard Chapel on June 16, 2001. The couple have two children, born 2005 and 2009.

Sims Gallagher was the niece of economist Christopher A. Sims.

== Career ==
After graduating from Occidental in 1995 with an A.B. degree in diplomacy & world affairs and environmental studies, she was awarded a Truman Scholarship and worked in Washington, D.C. as an intern in the Office of the Vice President and, later, as the science policy director at Ozone Action. She enrolled in the M.A.L.D. program at the Fletcher School, the professional international affairs school of Tufts University. There, she studied East Asia with a focus on economic development and climate negotiation in China and received her degree in 2000. She completed a Ph.D. in 2003; her dissertation, chaired by William R. Moomaw, was entitled Foreign Direct Investment as a Vehicle for Deploying Cleaner Technologies: Technology Transfer and the Big Three Automakers in China. She joined the Harvard Kennedy School as a postdoctoral fellow and worked as a lecturer and program director until joining the Fletcher School as an associate professor in 2009.

In 2010, she spent sabbatical as a visiting professor at Tsinghua University in Beijing. After receiving tenure at Tufts in 2013 and becoming Director of the Center for International Environment & Resource Policy that same year, she worked in 2014 and 2015 as an advisor to the Obama administration's Office of Science and Technology Policy and Department of State. In her role, she helped negotiate multiple U.S.–China climate agreements. Upon her return to Tufts, she was promoted to a professor in 2015 and founded the Climate Policy Lab within the Center for International Environment & Resource Policy in 2016, where she continues to serve as Founding Director.

Gallagher was appointed Dean of the Fletcher School in 2024 after having served as interim dean since 2023. She is the 15th dean of the school, and succeeds Rachel Kyte in the position. Gallagher is also a nonresident scholar at the Carnegie Endowment for International Peace and a board member of the Belfer Center for Science and International Affairs.

== Books ==
- Gallagher, Kelly Sims; Xuan, Xiaowei (2018). Titans of the Climate: Explaining Policy Process in the United States and China. MIT Press. doi:10.7551/mitpress/10272.001.0001. ISBN 978-0-262-53584-7.
- Gallagher, Kelly Sims (2014). The Globalization of Clean Energy Technology: Lessons from China. MIT Press. doi:10.7551/mitpress/9805.001.0001. ISBN 978-0-262-53373-7.
- Gallagher, Kelly Sims, ed. (2009). Acting in Time on Energy Policy. Foreword by David T. Ellwood. Brookings Institution Press. ISBN 978-0-8157-0367-9. JSTOR 10.7864/j.ctt6wph0v. Project MUSE 29303.
- Gallagher, Kelly Sims (2006). China Shifts Gears: Automakers, Oil, Pollution, and Development. MIT Press. doi:10.7551/mitpress/1813.001.0001. ISBN 978-0-262-57232-3.
