= Military budget of the Soviet Union =

Military expenditure of the USSR

The military budget of the Soviet Union was the portion of the portion of the overall budget of the USSR government that was allocated for the funding of the Ministry of Defence of the Soviet Union and the Soviet Armed Forces. Beyond the five armed services supervised by the Soviet Ministry of Defence (Strategic Rocket Forces; Air Defence Forces; Air Forces; Ground Forces; and Navy, plus the Soviet Airborne Forces), there were a wide variety of other armed organisations beyond the MOD, for example, the KGB Border Troops; the Government Communications Troops of the KGB; the Soviet Internal Troops; and the Railway Troops.

Military budgets finance employee salaries and training costs, the maintenance of equipment and facilities, operations, and development and procurement of weapons, equipment, and vehicles (especially via the Military-Industrial Commission of the USSR). Especially since 1947, the level of military spending of the USSR was a matter of dispute, since the USSR did not publish reliable figures for its military expenditure.

The burden of its military expenditure is believed to have been amongst factors contributing to the fall of the Soviet Union. "The Soviet economy was in.. serious trouble and the burden of military expenditure was much to blame" was the consensus among "most of the Soviet elite" as Gorbachev took over.

== History ==
=== 1922 to 1945 ===
In the mid-1920s the Soviet Union published figures for its military expenditure that were broken down into 9 groups including salaries, administrative expenses, clothing costs, technical supply, cultural and educational expenses, finance of defence industry and others. These 9 groups were further sub-divided such that figures were given for 79 individual entries. But Soviet military spending was progressively obfuscated. By the early 1930s only 2 groups of expenditure were presented, and by the early 1940s only a single line-item was given ascribed to the Soviet Department of Defence.

Following the Soviet Union's joining of the League of Nations in 1930, the Soviet politburo decided to conceal the actual amount of military spending the USSR was engaged in. According to the research of R.W. Davies by 1932 two-thirds of military spending was disguised as spending for civilian purposes. However, with the increasing risk of war after Adolf Hitler's rise to power in Germany, official expenditure increased substantially. For example, in 1934, military expenditure more than trebled from 1.65bn rubles to 5bn rubles. By 1936 the official budget was again relatively accurate. In 1940, the last full year before the Soviet Union was invaded in Operation Barbarossa, the official state budget was 5.7 billion rubles, or 32.6% of total Soviet state expenditure.

With the outbreak of war with Germany in 1941, the Soviet state funded the resulting greatly increased military expenditure through a mixture of tax-increases and deficit spending. Official defence spending peaked in nominal terms at 137.7bn rubles in 1944 before declining due to the need to invest in the economy, though as a percentage of state expenditure it peaked in the period 1942–1943 at ~59% as other expenditures were cut.

=== Cold War ===
After the end of the second world war official Soviet military spending decreased back to a level similar to that of the 1937, with expenditure stabilising around 18-20% of the total state budget in the years 1947-50. In the wake of the Korean War the budget saw moderate increases to 21.8% in 1951 and 23.9% in 1952. This fell back to 19.9% (10.7bn rubles) in 1955, and in 1956, following a cut in the official strength of the Soviet armed forces of 2,140,000 men, the official level of expenditure fell by ~1 billion rubles to 9.7bn rubles, though by 1957 spending had increased back to its 1955 level and stayed at roughly the same amount (~9.4bn) through out the 1957-1960 period, resulting in armed forces of lower numerical strength than before 1955 but having more in the way of advanced weaponry, including nuclear weapons.

Following the 1961 Berlin Crisis and subsequent increase in east-west tension, the official expenditure in rubles increased to a peak of 13.9bn rubles in 1963, though as a percentage of state expenditure this represented a fall (to 16.1% in 1963). Soviet publications represented this as a cut in expenditure, comparing it to the higher percentages of state expenditure related to defence in "imperialist" countries like the USA, where the military budget was ~77% of state expenditure (albeit from a budget that made up a much smaller amount of national GNP compared to Soviet state spending, which encompassed large parts of the economy which in the US would be in private hands).

In 1964 Nikita Khrushchev advocated reducing the military budget in order to produce more consumer goods, how his calls to reduce the military budget contributed to his ouster in October of that year. After decreasing slightly in the years 1964-5, with the coming to power of Leonid Brezhnev official military spending increased to 17.7bn rubles in 1969 and stayed at the level of approximately 17-18bn rubles annually all the way to 1983, though western analysts believed the actual expenditure to be much higher than this as this sum was less than 3% of the USSR's GNP in 1980. This under-stating of the real burden was confirmed by a reported 1972 statement of Brezhnev before a closed audience that the cost of the military was "one out of three rubles" of the Soviet budget (i.e., 12.5% of Soviet GNP), a fact later confirmed by the testimony of an émigré who had worked for Gosplan and from a smuggled version of the Politburo's statistical handbook.

According to former Soviet officials the true extent of military spending in the 1980's had been disguised to influence the atmosphere around arms limitation negotiations. The annual cost of the Soviet war in Afghanistan which began in 1979 was, by the early 1980's, estimated at US$5bn.

=== The Gorbachev era ===
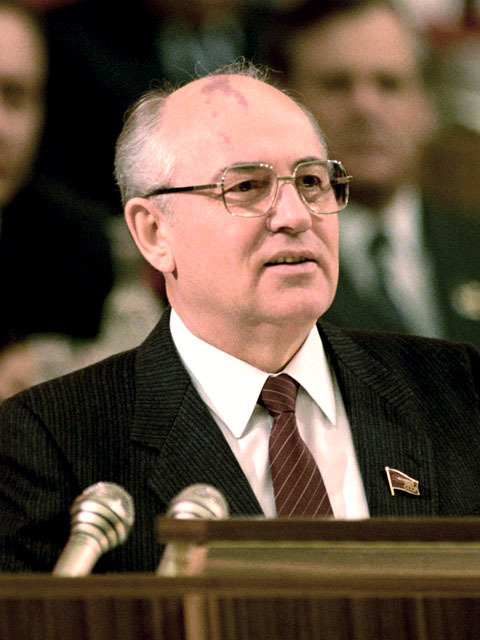
Gorbachev in 1987.

==== Glasnost ====
Following the rise to power of Mikhail Gorbachev, a November 1986 party central committee resolution requested that more accurate figures for Soviet military expenditure be produced. However, publication of such a figure was resisted by Gosplan and Sergey Akhromeyev. This was because publishing a figure valued in rubles risked making the USSR look like a country that was not a credible rival of the USA, since the production cost of Soviet weaponry in rubles was low. In contrast publishing figures adjusted for purchasing-power would risk disclosing facts about the Soviet economy and the cheapness of Soviet weaponry that would risk sales of arms on the international market.

In 1987, however, it was decided to declassify Soviet military expenditure within two or three years. In May 1989 a figure of 77.3bn rubles was finally published, or roughly 8.4% of Soviet GDP. This was, however, believed by many including Dmitri Steinberg, Soviet officials, and the CIA to still represent only a partial disclosure of the Soviet military budget.

==== Reductions in spending ====
By 1988 both Gorbachev and Soviet foreign minister Eduard Shevardnadze advocated cutting Soviet defence expenditure to ease Soviet economic problems, particularly due to the failure of Soviet economic reform. Gorbachev believed that cutting military spending would result in large amounts of resources being available for the civilian economy, however, this was not achieved during his period in power before the Soviet Union collapsed following the 1991 August Coup. Rather, Gorbachev's grip on the Soviet military was not sufficiently strong to rein in expenditure there until the 1987 flight of Matthias Rust prompted the dismissal of Sergei Sokolov and 100 other senior Soviet officers, after which Gorbachev was able to freeze Soviet military spending during 1987 and 1988. A 14.2% cut in the total military budget was announced in 1989 which was planned to become effective in 1991.

== As a factor in the collapse of the Soviet Union ==
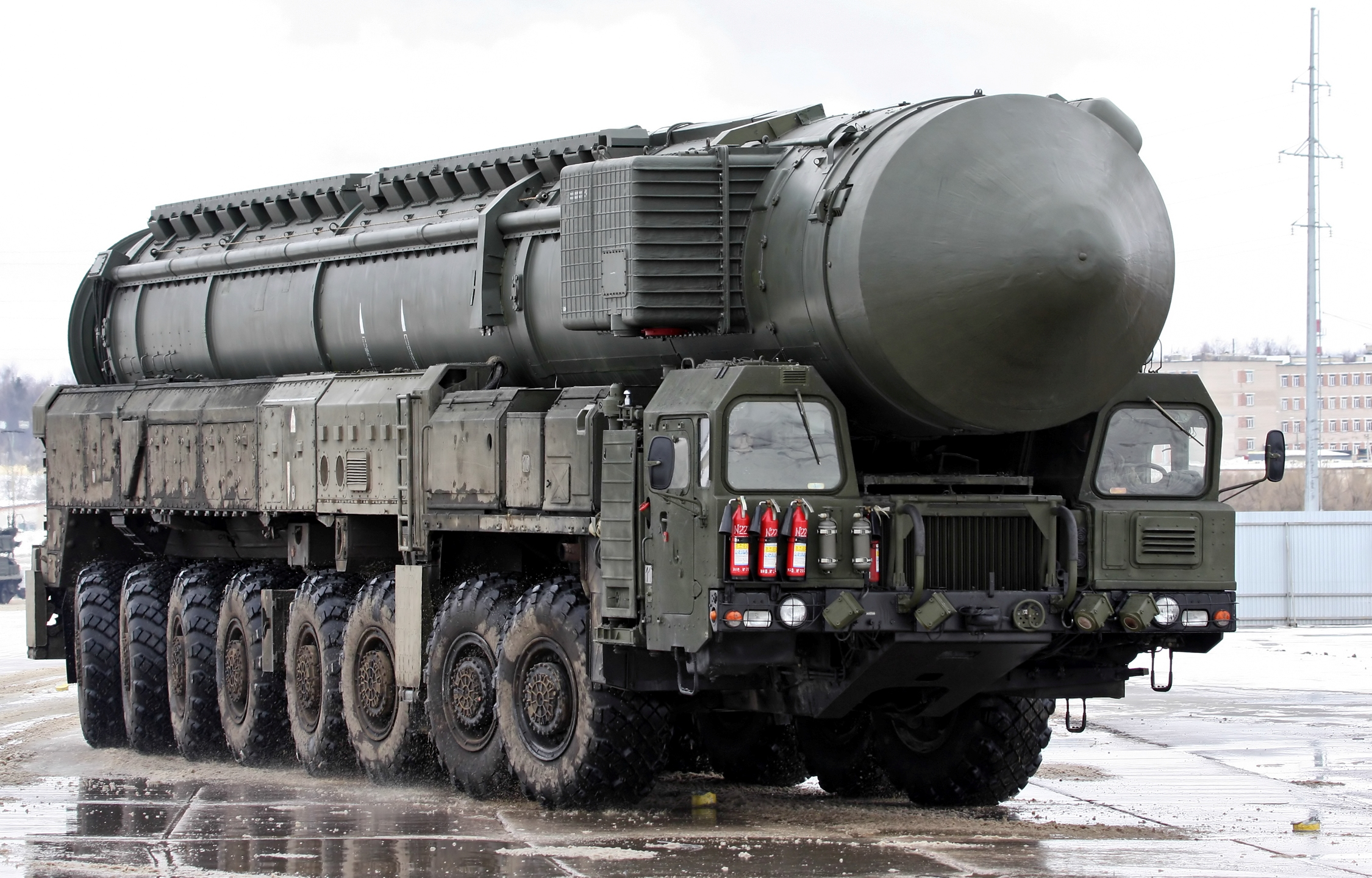
A transporter erector launcher (TEL) carrying a Topol-M missile container during rehearsals for the 2012 Moscow Victory Day Parade.

Whilst there is a general consensus that the burden of Soviet military spending was a contributory factor in the economic problems that caused the fall of the USSR, experts disagree about the extent to which it was a factor, and the extent to which that military spending was driven by competition with increased spending in the West.

Supporters of the Reagan administration, particularly Peter Schweizer in the book Victory, have described the fall of the Soviet Union as having occurred under the strain of military spending necessitated by the Reagan administration's rapid increase in US defence spending. Critics of this point of view such as Matthew Evangelista point out that, whilst the policies of the Reagan administration sparked concern in the USSR, there is little evidence that Reagan administration defence initiatives such as SDI resulted in large-scale increases in expenditure on the part of the Soviets. Instead it led to the Soviets developing relatively cheap, asymmetric responses such as their Topol-M missile. Dmitri Steinberg estimated that whilst Soviet military spending did increase due to the war in Afghanistan and the response to western "Star Wars" projects in the period 1979-1987, this increase was only by about 1.6% of GDP, with most of the economic burden of Soviet military spending already having been taken on before 1960.

== Accuracy of official statistics and alternative estimates ==
According to Russian academic Ksenia Gonchar writing in 1994, it was a consensus of experts studying Soviet military expenditure that "official figures are notoriously inadequate and need re-estimation", since it did not include many things that would reasonably be included in a figure for defence spending. According to Gonchar, during the 1980's it was doubted whether even the Soviet leadership themselves knew the actual figure, particularly when Mikhail Gorbachev and Eduard Shevardnadze produced figures for military spending that differed to those officially published. Writing in 1964, when the officially-published Soviet defence expenditure was scheduled to be 13.3bn, analyst Timothy Sosnovy of the Ukrainian Free University in Munich calculated that when indirect expenditure on the defence industry, strategic material reserves, scientific research for military purposes, pensions for veterans, and extra-budget/secret expenditure were included as well as the 13.3bn figure for official spending directly on the military, the figure was 31.9bn rubles.

=== Difficulties in estimation ===
However, attempts at re-estimation of the Soviet military budget, particularly attempts to produce dollar-figure estimates to compare it to the military expenditure of other countries, faced significant problems. This was partly because dollar-figure estimate of Soviet military spending represented what Soviet weapons, forces and military activities would cost if developed, purchased and operated in the United States. As such they did not represent the true burden of expenditure on the Soviet economy. Moreover estimation of the burden of Soviet military spending on the Soviet economy as a whole depended on estimations of the size of the Soviet economy, which was also a matter of debate. Additionally, the nature of the Soviet command economy made comparisons difficult, since, as Mikhail Burnstam of the Hoover Institute pointed out, the only measurable cost to the Soviet state as a whole of an individual weapon-system would be simply the labour used to create it, since the raw materials used to create it were bought from the state and any profit made from its sale would also be appropriated by the state. Moreover, since the cost of labour in the USSR was low due to the lack of free trade unions, this resulted in a very low cost compared to that of a comparable weapon-system produced in the west.

=== "Building block" versus "residual" estimates ===
One method of estimation favoured by the US Central Intelligence Agency used a so-called "building block" (AKA "direct costing", known officially as Strategic Cost Analysis Model, or SCAM) method of estimation whereby the value of individual components/artefacts used by the Soviet military was either obtained from official sources or estimated, and the total cost of all these items summed. The CIA twice made substantial revisions to their estimates, the first time in May 1976 where the estimates nearly doubled due to what was believed to be a previous under-stating of the price of Soviet equipment and size of Soviet forces (and thus cost of maintaining them), and the second time in 1983 the CIA produced a downward revision of roughly 2-4% due to lower Soviet economic growth.

This method of calculations was criticised by analysts including Steven Rosefielde as understating the speed of growth of Soviet military expenditure due to false assumptions and failing to account for increases in price of Soviet military equipment due to their increasingly advanced nature. Rosenfielde accused the CIA of practising "false science" to minimise the degree of militarisation of the Soviet economy and even of using statistics manipulated by Soviet counterintelligence. Former CIA analyst William T. Lee, who believed the CIA was understating Soviet expenditure, also criticised the CIA's methodology as being too reliant on US defence companies to produce estimates for the cost of Soviet weaponry.

In contrast, Franklyn D. Holzman criticised the CIA's method of estimation as being, in his view, flawed due to their assumption of equivalence between US and Soviet military equipment when US military equipment and personnel was of a higher quality (and hence cost). Holzman focused particularly on the "index number problem", where, in his view, the CIA lacked prices in rubles for specific items and so instead valued them in dollars and then converted them based on the price of items whose price was known in rubles, which he believed tended to lead to an overstatement of Soviet military spending. Holzman charged the CIA with doing this to legitimise the increased military spending of Ronald Reagan's administration.

Another method, favoured by most other analysts outside the CIA (including British Sovietologists), used the so-called "residual" method whereby Soviet official statistics were used, with parts of civilian expenditure that were believed to be linked to the Soviet military (military R&D, military pensions, spending on the KGB and other quasi-military organs on the state etc.) are reallocated as military expenditure. The above calculation by Sosnovy is an early example of such a calculation, though later ones were produced by analysts including Rosefielde and Holzman. Whilst not suffering from the "index number problem", according to Donald F. Burton, a CIA Soviet analyst, the residual method had the downside of a wide range of error due to problems in determining which civilian expenditure to reallocate, and relied excessively on inaccurate Soviet figures.

Writing in 1996, Robert M. Gates admitted that CIA estimates of Soviet expenditure had "understated the full cost of the Soviet military". As a result, Gates believed they had failed to properly estimate the burden of military spending on the Soviet Union.

== See also ==
- Military-Industrial Commission of the USSR
