= Leila Fawaz =

Lebanese historian and academician

- Born: Sudan
- Title: Issam M. Fares Professor of Lebanese and Eastern Mediterranean Studies
- Board member of: Harvard Board of Overseers
- Awards: Legion of Honour

Academic background
- Education: American University of Beirut

Academic work
- Discipline: History
- Sub-discipline: Middle Eastern studies
- Institutions: Tufts University, The Fares Center for Eastern Mediterranean Studies

Leila Fawaz is a Lebanese historian and academician. She is the founding director of The Fares Center for Eastern Mediterranean Studies from 2001 to 2012. Fawaz was born in Sudan to Greek-Orthodox Lebanese parents and raised in Lebanon. She took two degrees at the American University of Beirut between 1967 and 1968 and studied history at Harvard University between 1972 and 1979.

From 1990 to 1994, Fawaz was the editor-in-chief of The International Journal of Middle East Studies, where she advanced conducting analytical and comparative research, with an international and cross-disciplinary approach. She bemoaned the overspecialization within the field, the neglect of attention to humanities/arts, and uninteresting writing, and linked these problems to Middle East studies as a whole, because researchers were "still a long way from being pathfinders in the world of scholarship generally."

== Books ==
She is the author of landmark works on the history of the modern Middle East and Lebanon.

- A Land of Aching Hearts: The Middle East in the Great War (Harvard University Press, 2014)
- Transformed Landscapes: Essays on Palestine and the Middle East in Honor of Walid Khalidi (co-editor, the American University in Cairo Press, 2009)
- Modernity and Culture from the Mediterranean to the Indian Ocean (co-editor, Columbia University Press, 2002)
- An Occasion for War: Mount Lebanon and Damascus in 1860 (I. B. Tauris, 1994 and University of California Press, 1995)
- State and Society in Lebanon (editor, Oxford: Centre for Lebanese Studies, 1991)
- Merchants and Migrants in Nineteenth Century Beirut (Harvard University Press, 1983)
