= Center for International Environment and Resource Policy =

Education and research organization

Coordinates: 42°24′28″N 71°07′18″W

- Abbreviation: CIERP
- Formation: 1992
- Founder: William Moomaw
- Type: Academic organization
- Location: Medford, Massachusetts
- Fields: Environmental policy within international relations
- Co-Director: Kelly Sims Gallagher
- Co-Director: Melissa McCracken
- Parent organization: The Fletcher School of Law and Diplomacy, Tufts University
- Staff: 3 core faculty, 5 affiliated faculty, 3 Professors of Practice
- Website: https://sites.tufts.edu/cierp/

The Center for International Environment and Resource Policy (CIERP) is an interdisciplinary education and research organization founded in 1992, devoted to the study of international sustainable development, within The Fletcher School of Law and Diplomacy, at Tufts University.

== Activities ==
CIERP is a research center at The Fletcher School of Law and Diplomacy devoted to research, education, and policy-making in sustainable development. Its areas of inquiry, called research programs, include: Energy, Climate and Innovation; Agriculture, Forests, and Biodiversity; Sustainable Development Diplomacy and Governance; Sustainable Development Economics; and Water and Oceans. The Center describes its approach as multidisciplinary, looking for "innovative approaches to shifting global development onto a path that is more environmentally, socially, and economically sustainable," analyzing how "economic and social activities impact the environment, and design strategies for meeting human needs without straining the planet’s resources."

The research arm of CIERP is composed of three core faculty members, with five affiliated faculty from The Fletcher School and Tufts University as well as between 5 and 10 research fellows. Its education activities include offering courses at the master's level as part of The Fletcher School's International Environment and Resource Policy field and direction and supervision of PhD students. While the center's outlook is global, faculty research concentrates on the United States, China, India, Brazil, and Niger.

The Center is also engaged in advancing evidence-based policy making by disseminating its research through publishing academic peer-reviewed papers, commentary in print and on-line media, organizing conferences, and issuing reports. Its faculty have appointments at organizations including the American Academy of Arts and Sciences, the Council on Foreign Relations, The Nature Conservancy, Woods Hole Research Center, Belfer Center for Science and International Affairs and the White House.

== History ==
CIERP was established in 1992 by William Moomaw, Professor of International Environmental Policy, now Professor Emeritus. CIERP is one of five major centers at the Fletcher school devoted to the study and practice of different fields of international relations. In 2007, the year that the Nobel Peace Prize was jointly awarded to the Intergovernmental Panel on Climate Change IPCC and Vice President Al Gore, the school's Dean Stephen W. Bosworth stressed that "Issues such as energy and the environment are among the most pressing topics that a school such as Fletcher is going to have to address in the coming years", deciding to "enhance resources in teaching and research in these areas." William Moomaw had been a long time contributor to the IPCC reports.

In 2013 Moomaw stepped down and Kelly Sims Gallagher took over as the second director of the center. When Gallagher was appointed to the position she stated “People have spent the first 20 years of the program solidifying its presence, and I want the next 20 years to be about broadening our impact through teaching, research and policy analysis”. The following year she was appointed senior policy advisor to the White House Office of Science and Technology Policy's Energy and Environment Division for the 2014–15 academic year, returning to CIERP in fall 2015.

== Leadership ==
=== William Moomaw (1992-2013) ===
CIERP was founded in 1992 by William Moomaw, the then Professor of International Environmental Policy at the Fletcher School of Law and Diplomacy. Moomaw remained the director of the center for 22 years, until his retirement in 2013. He holds a Ph.D. in physical chemistry from the Massachusetts Institute of Technology.

Moomaw worked at the intersection of science and policy, advocating for international sustainable development. Moomaw has given expert testimony in the U.S. Congress, and written reports for the United Nations. He worked on energy and forestry legislation and on legislation that eliminated American use of CFCs in spray cans to protect the ozone layer. He was also a lead author for several Intergovernmental Panel on Climate Change (IPCC) reports, including being the coordinating lead author on greenhouse gas emissions reduction Energy Supply in Mitigation of Climate Change.

=== Kelly Sims Gallagher (2013-present) ===
In 2013 Kelly Sims Gallagher was appointed the director of CIERP. Gallagher is the Professor of Energy and Environmental Policy at the Fletcher School of Law and Diplomacy. She studied international relations a Masters and a PhD from The Fletcher School. Before joining the Fletcher faculty in 2009 she was a Senior Research Associate and Director of the Energy Technology Innovation Project at the Belfer Center for Science and International Affairs, John F. Kennedy School of Government at Harvard University.

Gallagher was a member of the President's Council of Advisors on Science & Technology (PCAST) Energy Technology Innovation System Working Group that contributed to accelerating the pace of change in energy technologies through integrated federal energy policy. For the academic year of 2014–2015, Gallagher was appointed Senior Policy Adviser at the White House Office of Science and Technology Policy's Energy and Environment Division.

== Selected academic publications ==
=== Agriculture ===
- Gramig, Benjamin M.; Reeling, Carson J.; Cibin, Raj; Chaubey, Indrajeet (January 22, 2013). "Environmental and economic tradeoffs in a watershed when using corn stover for bioenergy". Environmental Science and Technology. 47 (4): 1784–1791. Bibcode:2013EnST...47.1784G. doi:10.1021/es303459h. PMID 23339778.
- Cohn, Avery; Havlik, P.; Herrero, M.; Mossnier, A.; O'Hare, M.; Obersteiner, M.; Schmid, E.; Valin, H. (May 20, 2014). "Cattle ranching intensification in Brazil can reduce global greenhouse gas emissions by sparing land from deforestation". Proceedings of the National Academy of Sciences of the United States of America. 111 (20): 7236–7241. Bibcode:2014PNAS..111.7236C. doi:10.1073/pnas.1307163111. PMC 4034253. PMID 24778243.

=== Governance ===
- Bhandary, Rishikesh Ram (May 2013). "Following the LDCs: How Leadership in the Climate Regime Could Look". Climate, and Innovation Program, CIERP, The Fletcher School.
- Gallagher, Kelly Sims (Winter 2013). "Why & How Governments Support Renewable Energy". Daedalus. 142 (1): 59–77. doi:10.1162/DAED_a_00185. S2CID 57570791.
- Following the LDCs: How Leadership in the Climate Regime Could Look, (Policy Brief. Medford, MA: Energy, Climate, and Innovation Program, CIERP, The Fletcher School,), by Bhandary, Rishikesh Ram May 2013.
- Walsh, Katherine. "Accelerating Green Building in China" (PDF). Energy, Climate, and Innovation Program, CIERP, The Fletcher School. Archived from the original (PDF) on 2016-03-05.

=== Health ===
- Tanaka, Shinsuke (March 6, 2015). "Environmental regulations on air pollution in China and their impact on infant mortality". Journal of Health Economics. 42 (July 2015): 90–103. doi:10.1016/j.jhealeco.2015.02.004. PMID 25868145.
- Tanaka, Shinsuke (March 6, 2015). "Does Abolishing User Fees Lead to Improved Health Status? Evidence from Post-apartheid South Africa". American Economic Journal: Economic Policy. 6 (3): 282–312. doi:10.1257/pol.6.3.282.

=== Energy ===
- Gallagher, Kelly Sims; Randell, John C. (Summer 2012). "What Makes U.S. Energy Consumers Tick?". Issues in Science and Technology. 28 (4).
- Zhang, F.; Deng, H.; Margolis, R.; Su, J. (February 19, 2015). "Analysis of distributed-generation photovoltaic deployment, installation time and cost, market barriers, and policies in China". Energy Policy. 8 (2015): 43–55. doi:10.1016/j.enpol.2015.02.010.

=== Energy technology innovation, transfer, adoption ===
- Gallagher, Kelly Sims; Grubler, Arnulf; Kuhl, Laura; Nemet, Gregory; Wilson, v (July 31, 2012). "The Energy Technology Innovation System". Annual Review of Environment and Resources. 37: 137–162. doi:10.1146/annurev-environ-060311-133915.
- Wilson, C.; Grubler, A.; Gallagher, K.S.; Nemet, G. (November 2012). "Marginalization of end-use technologies in energy innovation for climate protection" (PDF). Nature Climate Change. 2 (11): 780–788. Bibcode:2012NatCC...2..780W. doi:10.1038/nclimate1576.
- Gallagher, K.S.; Anadon, L.D. (March 2014). "DOE Budget Authority for Energy Research, Development, and Demonstration Database". Energy Technology Innovation Policy research group, Belfer Center for Science and International Affairs, Harvard Kennedy School.
- Gallagher, Kelly Sims (2014). The Globalization of Clean Energy Technology: Lessons from China. MIT Press. ISBN 978-0262026987.
- Biagini, Bonizella; Kuhl, Laura; Gallagher, Kelly Sims; Ortiz, Claudia (July 13, 2014). "Technology transfer for adaptation". Nature Climate Change. 4 (9): 828–834. Bibcode:2014NatCC...4..828B. doi:10.1038/nclimate2305.
- Sims Gallagher, Kelly; Myslikova, Zdenka (September–October 2014). "Collective Action. Adaptation, Mitigation, Innovation: the case of the Chinese PV industry". IEEE Power and Energy Magazine: 28–33.

=== Forestry ===
- Bushley, Bryan R.; Bhandary, Rishikesh R. (February 2013). "Tracing the REDD Bullet: Implications of Market-Based Forest Conservation Mechanisms for Poverty Alleviation in Developing Countries". In Dulal, Hari Bansha (ed.). Poverty Reduction in a Changing Climate. Lexington Books.

=== International climate negotiations ===
- Moomaw, William R. (2013). "Can the International Treaty System Address Climate Change?". The Fletcher Forum of World Affairs. 37 (1): 105–118. ISSN 1046-1868.
- Moomaw, William R. (Winter 2013). "Can the International Treaty System Address Climate Change?". The Fletcher Forum of World Affairs. 37 (1).
- Bhandary, Rishikesh Ram (March 2013). "What was New at Rio+20? An Analysis of The Future We Want". Climate, and Innovation Program, CIERP, The Fletcher School. Archived from the original on 2015-01-24.
- Kanter, D.R.; Mauzerall, D.L.; Ravishankara, A.R.; Daniel, J.S.; Portmann, R.W.; Grabiel, P.; Moomaw, W.R.; Galloway, J.N. (2013-02-19). "A post-Kyoto partner: Considering the stratospheric ozone regime as a tool to manage nitrous oxide". Proceedings of the National Academy of Sciences of the United States of America. 110 (12): 4451–4457. Bibcode:2013PNAS..110.4451K. doi:10.1073/pnas.1222231110. PMC 3607011. PMID 23440192.

=== Other ===
- Eisgruber, Lasse (June 2013). "The resource curse: Analysis of the applicability to the large-scale export of electricity from renewable resources". Energy Policy. 57: 429–440. doi:10.1016/j.enpol.2013.02.013.
