= Institute for Business in the Global Context =

Educational organization

Coordinates: 42°24′27.58″N 71°07′18.08″W

Institute for Business in the Global Context (IBGC)
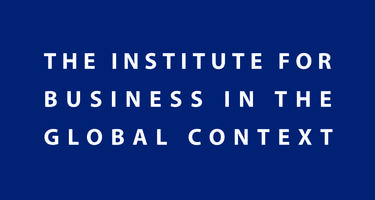
- Formation: 2011
- Founder: Bhaskar Chakravorti
- Type: Educational organization
- Purpose: Study international business
- Location: Medford, Massachusetts
- Executive Director: Bhaskar Chakravorti
- Parent organization: The Fletcher School of Law and Diplomacy, Tufts University
- Subsidiaries: The Council on Emerging Market Enterprises (CEME)
- Website: http://fletcher.tufts.edu/IBGC

Institute for Business in the Global Context (IBGC) is an educational organization founded in 2011, devoted to international business studies, within The Fletcher School of Law and Diplomacy, at Tufts University. IBGC houses the school's Master of International Business (MIB), and the Council on Emerging Market Enterprises (CEME).

== History ==
=== Prior to foundation ===
In the late 1970s the Fletcher school started to incorporate some international business and finance courses within a curriculum traditionally centered on international politics.

In 2007 the Fletcher school created the Master of International Business program (MIB) and the think tank Center for Emerging Market Enterprises (CEME), both of which were launched in the fall 2008 along with several new international business centered initiatives at The Fletcher School.

These new initiatives, under the auspices of Dean Stephen W. Bosworth, were part of the Fletcher school's strategy of connecting the study of business with its larger social, cultural and political context.

Fletcher alumnus and co-founder and former executive director of Mercer Oliver Wyman, Charles N. Bralver, was appointed the first Senior Associate Dean for International Business and Finance at the Fletcher School from 2007 to 2010 and was Executive Director of the MIB and CEME during that period.

=== Establishment ===
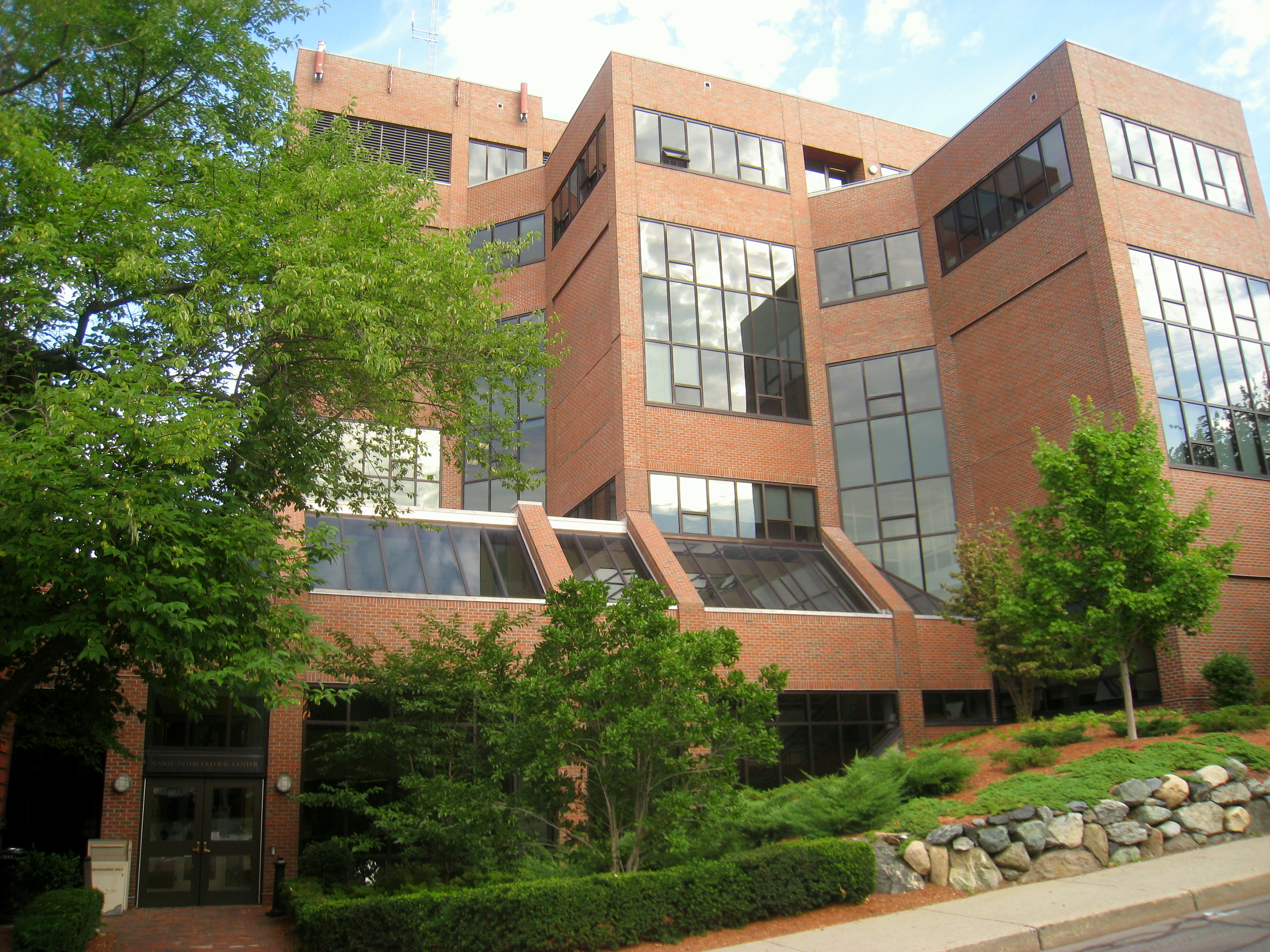
The Fletcher School's Cabot Intercultural Center, where IBGC is housed

In 2011 Bralver was succeeded by Bhaskar Chakravorti. Chakravorti is a former partner of McKinsey & Company, and held research and teaching positions at MIT and Harvard University.

As the Senior Associate Dean of International Business and Finance, Chakravorti founded the IBGC and incorporated within it the MIB and CEME. The new institute serves as umbrella department to host the school's international business education and research.

He defined the purpose of IBGC as "creating cross-linkages between business and the broader contextual factors that affect business and vice versa", adding that subjects could include "geography, history, cross-border issues, security questions, diplomacy and cultural issues." He argued that Fletcher's unique approach to business lies in that "there is a lot of overlap of business decisions with the public policy arena and issues like international trade, peace and conflict, humanitarian issues, inclusive growth issues. These are not the kind of topics that business schools normally talk about". Inc. magazine noted IBGC's thinking that as more businesses become global in scope, leaders must become experts in geopolitics as well as economics and must be conversant in topics as diverse as the domestic agendas of foreign markets and the ways those countries use natural resources and resolve regional disputes.

In December 2013 CEME's full form name was changed to Council on Emerging Market Enterprises, and transitioned into serving as a nexus of experts. At the same time of the name change, CEME was merged with, and became a subsidiary of, IBGC.

== Master of International Business ==
IBGC houses the Fletcher School's the two-year residential Master of International Business degree program (MIB) which combines an international affairs curriculum with a core of business courses.

IBGC's founding dean noted that the MIB program is different from traditional business schools MBA programs in that the MIB trains its students to not only understand markets and private enterprise, but also to understand the underlying international socio-political forces that impact them: "the political framework, legislative environment, security issues and historical considerations that are specific to each country, as well as the widening gap between rich and poor that plagues many economies". "The biggest problems in the world arise not just from state failures, or just from market failures. They come from a combination of both", so "classes on finance and marketing are crucial but they have little value unless they're framed in the appropriate historical, political or sociological context". Understanding these can also lead to identifying new opportunities. In addition, Dean Chakravorti argues that the program, infused with a liberal-arts education, prepares graduates to understand ambiguity and the constant shifting of the world.

The MIB degree offers courses on emerging market entrepreneurship, impact investing, and inclusive finance ventures, as well as more traditional business courses in finance, operations, strategy and management, etc.

Students who undertake the MIB often have previous international experience, coming from both the private sector (including consulting, banking, multinational organizations), as well as NGOs. Students are required to demonstrate proficiency in a second language. IBGC's director notes that the program gets its value from the academic proficiency of the professors, as well as from the diversity of experiences that students bring.

== Activities ==
Besides housing the school's Master of International Business and other course-based programs, IBGC is organized around three other "core activity areas": research, dialogue (conferences), and a lab (practical experience including consulting and entrepreneurship).

=== Research ===
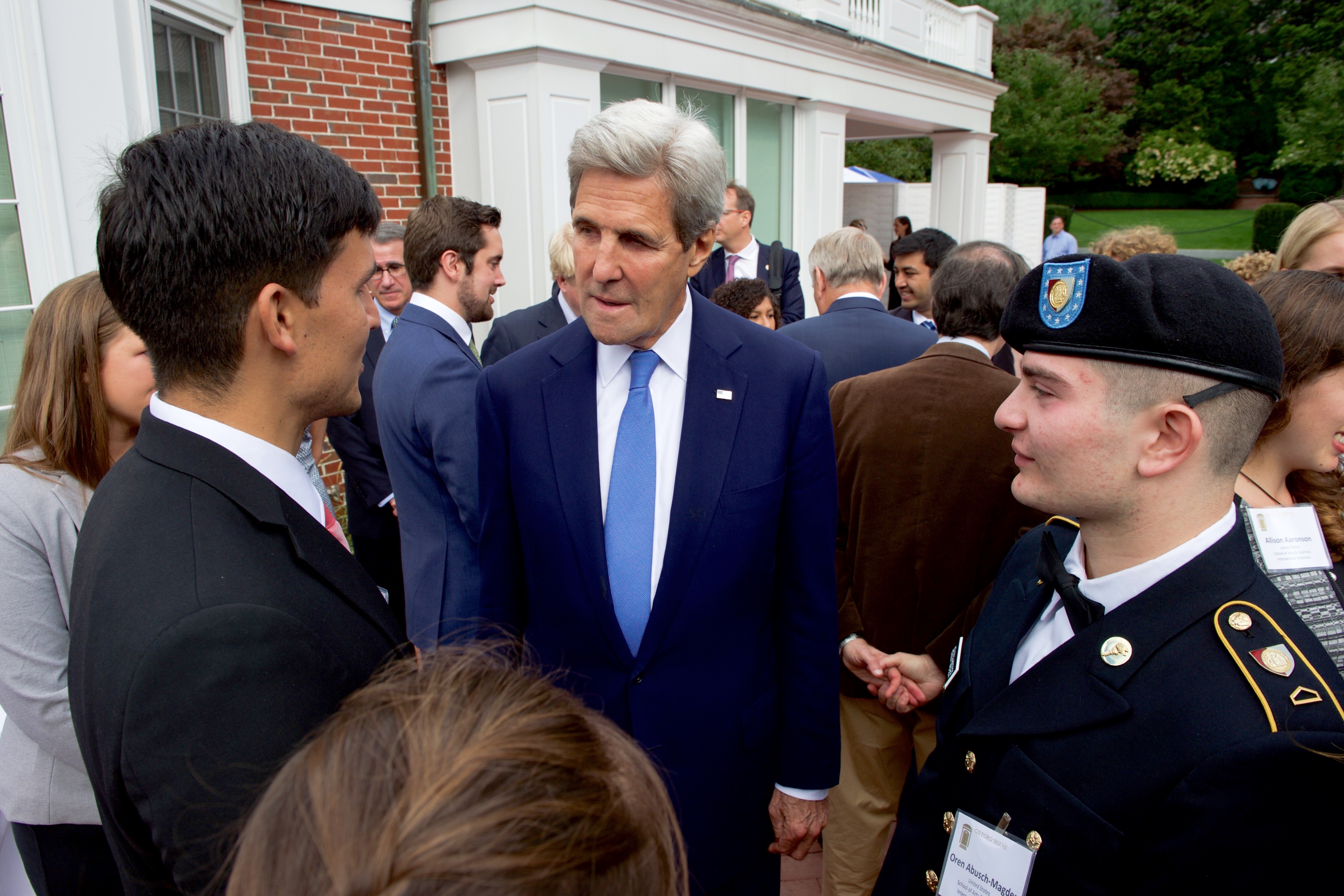
U.S. Secretary of State John Kerry chats with Fletcher students

IBGC’s research areas of focus include Country Management and Doing Business in BRICS, Inclusive and Sustainable Growth, Innovation and Change, and Sovereign Wealth Funds and Global Capital Flows.

=== Events ===
The Institute, and CEME, engage with global entities and businesses through its several conferences, speaker series, and a consulting course. One example of such events was the 2014 conference Turkey’s Turn? Perennial Linchpin or Emerging Hub?. IBGC also supports the student-led Fletcher International Business Club.

=== Experiential Learning ===
Additional activities offered through the Institute allow students to engage in field work through consulting, business-related research and social start-ups. Under the Global Consulting Program businesses can engage students for consulting projects that require "a multidisciplinary approach, as well as cross-cultural and foreign language skills".

Since 2013 IBGC has organized the Fletcher D-Prize Poverty Solutions Venture competition, focused on funding proven poverty interventions. The D-Prize awards social venture projects that are deemed to best answer the question: “If you had $20,000, how would you fight poverty?”

=== Executive education and other programs ===
IBGC offers the Fletcher Leadership Program for Financial Inclusion (FLPFI) "for banking regulators and policymakers from emerging and frontier markets to promote and further develop their work on policy and regulation in financial services for the poor".

=== Partnerships ===
Several business schools have partnered with the Fletcher School to offer dual master's degrees or exchanges in international affairs and business, for students wishing to address issues at the intersection of business and policy, and tackle questions of political context. These include Dartmouth College's Tuck School of Business, China Europe International Business School, HEC Paris, IE Business School (Spain), Indian School of Business and Higher School of Economics (Russia).

== Notable research ==
=== Digital Evolution Index ===
IBGC in partnership with MasterCard in 2014 began tracking the drivers that define countries' digital evolution, and that can be most prepared to support the next billion of e-consumers. The index looks at supply, demand, institutions, and innovation. The study measured each country’s across the four drivers from 2008 through 2013, identifying the current state of each country, as well as their trajectory. Countries were grouped into four trajectory zones: Break Out, Stall Out, Stand Out, Watch Out. The results of the index were further analyzed in the report Digital Planet: Readying for the Rise of the e-Consumer.

=== Cost of cash ===
IBGC published a series of papers to examine the cost of cash (in contrast to electronic transactions) worldwide for consumers, businesses, and government. The overarching conclusion solidified the notion of that cash is a highly inefficient system to store value and conduct transactions. In the case of the U.S. economy, the use of bills and coins costs the U.S. economy at least $200 billion each year (about $1,739 per household).

The research also showed that cash transactions are disproportionately costly on the poor, with "the less money you have, the more money you spend to get your money". This is especially the case for those who do not have bank accounts (the study calls this group the "unbanked"), who incur in multiple kinds of fees to access their cash. Bhaskar Chakravorti, co-author of the study, said that cash has "the effect of a regressive tax" which "exacerbates social inequalities."

The study makes the case for shrinking the physical cash in the economy. It also identifies the reason for a slow pace in that direction: the costs are hidden and diffuse enough that any one stakeholder doesn’t have the incentive to change everything, and some non-cash alternatives, like credit cards, can be even more costly to the poor.

The authors advice policy makers to invest more in financial education and inclusion, protect consumers while encouraging innovation.

=== SovereignNET ===
CEME fellows established in 2011 the Sovereign Wealth Fund Initiative within IBGC, in partnership with the financial services company State Street Corporation. and the law firm K&L Gates LLP. It was founded to provide strategic analysis and quantitative research focused on public policy issues and investment challenges facing sovereign wealth funds, institutional investors, central banks, governments and international organizations. It also aimed at providing executive education on topics such as direct-investment transparency, national investment restrictions and the impact of tax policy. The Sovereign Wealth Fund Initiative subsequently changed its name to The Fletcher Network for Sovereign Wealth and Global Capital, or SovereignNET in its short form.

== Council on Emerging Market Enterprises ==
Council on Emerging Market Enterprises (CEME)
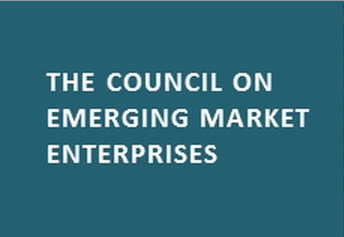
- Formation: 2007
- Founder: Charles Bralver
- Purpose: Study and application of best practices in emerging market enterprises
- Headquarters: Medford, Massachusetts
- Executive Director: Bhaskar Chakravorti
- Parent organization: Institute for Business in the Global Context (IBGC)
- Website: http://fletcher.tufts.edu/CEME
- Formerly called: Center for Emerging Market Enterprises (2007-2013)

IBGC houses the Council on Emerging Market Enterprises (CEME), which serves as the nexus point of experts from diverse fields that engage with IBGC to lend their expertise through conferences, research, and student coaching.

CEME's founding purpose was the study and application of best practices in emerging market enterprises through research, conferences, and visits from senior business executives.

=== History ===
CEME was founded in 2007 concurrently with the creation of the Master of International Business (MIB) program at the Fletcher School, as part of the school's strategy of expanding its scope of international relations to strengthen its study of business and economics.

The at-the-time Dean Stephen W. Bosworth stated that CEME would be central to the new program and would help establish more connections with practitioners in the private and public sectors. At its inception Thomas Schmidheiny donated two million dollars, stating that it wanted to support its "unique approach in understanding the social and cultural issues of other countries". CEME's first executive director was Charles Bralver. In 2011 Bhaskar Chakravorti succeeded him.

CEME was originally named Center for Emerging Market Enterprises, established to become the think tank arm of IBGC. In December 2013 CEME changed its full form name to Council on Emerging Market Enterprises. As a council, it transitioned from being a think tank into serving as the nexus point of experts from multiple areas, that engage with IBGC by lending their expertise for conferences, research, and student coaching.

=== Research ===
CEME is composed of a network of senior fellows who perform research on emerging and frontier market issues. The council’s areas of expertise include: Inclusive Growth, Sovereign Wealth and Global Capital, Innovation and Change, Country Management and Doing Business in BRICs.

Original research performed by CEME's fellows is often published by IBGC. IBGC also offers fellowships to students to lead their own research projects.

=== Guest lectures and conferences ===
CEME fellows are often invited to speak at The Fletcher School as part of the Institute for Business in the Global Context’s Global Speaker Series. While on campus, many Fellows mentor Fletcher students in their areas of expertise.

In 2009, in partnership with the Bretton Woods Committee, CEME held a conference entitled Strengthening Capital Markets in Emerging Market Countries In 2011 CEME held the Strategy, Operations, and Leadership for Emerging & Frontier Economies Conference and Killing Cash - Pros and Cons of Mobile Money for the World's Poor, A Look at Both Sides of the Coin.

== In-house publishing ==
IBGC publishes in-house original research performed by its resident professors, often partnering with students. IBGC also offers fellowships to students to lead their own research projects.

=== Digital evolution index ===
- Chakravorti, Bhaskar; Tunnard, Christopher; Shankar Chaturvedi, Ravi (2014). "Digital Planet: Readying for the Rise of the e-Consumer" (PDF). Archived from the original on 2017-01-23. (Executive summary)

=== Cost of cash ===
- Chakravorti, Bhaskar; Mazzotta, Benjamin (2013). "Cost of Cash in the United States" (PDF). Archived from the original on 2015-08-25.
- Mazzotta, Benjamin; et al. "Cost of Cash in India". Archived from the original on 2017-02-04.
- Mazzotta, Benjamin; et al. "Cost of Cash in Mexico" (PDF). Archived from the original on 2017-01-24.

=== Inclusive Business ===
- Chakravorti, Bhaskar; Macmillan, Graham; Siesfeld, Tony. "Growth for Good or Good for Growth?: How Sustainable and Inclusive Activities are Changing Business and Why Companies Aren't Changing Enough" (PDF). Archived from the original on 2017-01-24.
- "The Inclusive Innovators" (PDF). 2016. Archived from the original on 2017-02-25.

=== Student-led research ===
- Galloway, Tommy (2013). "Cash in Context: Uncovering Financial Services in Myanmar" (PDF). Archived from the original on 2017-01-24.
- Baghudana, Anisha; Leis, Julia (2014). "Navigating Nairobi: Digital Innovation in Urban Transport and Logistics in Kenya" (PDF). Archived from the original on 2017-01-24.
- Willis-Ertür, Sarah; Vader, Jennie (2014). "More than Meets the Eye: Business Practices and Constraints of SMEs in Turkey" (PDF). Archived from the original on 2017-01-24. (Turkish version)
- Mori, Michael; Zimmer, Trevor (2015). "Mobilizing Banking for Indonesia's Poor". Innovations. 10 (1–2). MIT Press Journals: 95–124. doi:10.1162/inov_a_00232. S2CID 57560142.
- Cohen-Fournier, Nathan (2016). "Walking on Thin Ice: Entrepreneurship in Nunavik" (PDF). Archived from the original (PDF) on 2017-02-04.
- Choucair, Nadim; Flynn, Tom (2016). "Circular 331: $500+ Million to Create Lebanon's Knowledge-Based Economy?" (PDF). Archived from the original (PDF) on 2017-02-04.

=== Conference reports ===
- "Africa's Turn? The Promise and Reality of the Global Economy's "Final Frontier"" (PDF). 2012. Archived from the original on 2017-01-24.
- "Turkey's Turn?: Perennial Linchpin or Emerging Hub?" (PDF). 2014. Archived from the original on 2017-01-24.
- "The Inclusive City: Triumph, Reflection, Innovation" (PDF). 2014. Archived from the original on 2017-01-24.
- "Inclusion, Inc" (PDF). 2015. Archived from the original on 2017-01-24.
- "Greece's Turn? Litmus Test for Europe" (PDF). 2016. Archived from the original (PDF) on 2017-02-25.

== Publications ==
=== Monographs ===
- CEME; Oliver Wyman (2010). "Food/fuel price dynamics: Developing a framework for strategic investments" (PDF).
- Chan-Lau, Jorge A. (2010). "Balance Sheet Network Analysis of Too-Connected-to-Fail Risk in Global and Domestic Banking Systems". International Monetary Fund.
- Wilson, Kim (2010). "Savings and Chance: Learning from the Lottery to Improve Financial Services in Haiti". Feinstein International Center.
- Sullivan, Nicholas (2011). "Subsidized Cell Phones Provide Significant Economic Gains for Poor and Near-Poor Americans" (PDF). New Millennium Research Council.

=== Books by CEME's fellows ===
- The Slow Pace of Fast Change: Bringing Innovations to Market in a Connected World, by Bhaskar Chakravorti (Harvard Business School Press, 2003)
- You Can Hear Me Now: How Microloans and Cell Phones Are Connecting the World’s Poor to the Global Economy , by Nicholas Sullivan (Jossey-Bass, 2007)
- Winning in the Indian Market: Understanding the Transformation of Consumer India , by Rama Bijapurkar (Wiley, 2007)
- A Call for Judgment: Sensible Finance for a Dynamic Economy, by Amar Bhidé (Oxford University Press, 2010)
- Financial Promise for the Poor: How Groups Build Microsavings, by Kim Wilson, Malcolm Harper, and Matthew Griffith ' (Kumarian Press, 2010)
- A Fistful of Rice: My Unexpected Quest to End Poverty Through Profitability, by Vikram Akula (2011)
- Money, Real Quick: The Story of M-PESA, by Nicholas Sullivan and Tonny K. Omwansa (Guardian Books, 2012) ASIN B007FPP7NI
- The Chinese City by Weiping Wu and Piper Gaubatz (Routledge, 2012) ISBN 978-0415575751
- Management in Complex Environments: Questions for Leaders, Edited by Brian Ganson (International Council of Swedish Industry, 2013) ISBN 978-9163739910
- A Never-Before World, Tracking the Evolution of Consumer India, by Rama Bijapurkar (Penguin Books India, 2013) ISBN 978-0670086795
- The Next Revolution in our Credit-Driven Economy: The Advent of Financial Technology, by Paul Schulte (2015)
- Peace through Entrepreneurship: Investing in a Startup Culture for Security and Development, by Steven Koltai (2016)
