= The Soviet Economy, 1970-1990: A Statistical Analysis =

1990 book by Dmitri Steinberg

- Author: Dmitri Steinberg
- Language: English
- Publisher: International Trade Press
- Publication date: 1990
- Publication place: San Francisco
- Media type: Print

The Soviet Economy, 1970-1990: A Statistical Analysis is a 1990 book by Dmitri Steinberg, a US-based Sovietologist.

== Summary ==
Using official statistics published by Goskomstat just before the fall of the Soviet Union, Steinberg reconstructed a macroeconomic picture of the overall Soviet economy in the period 1970-1990. From this analysis he concluded that, compared to CIA estimates, Soviet economic growth had been smaller and defence expenditure had been higher. This resulted in an estimate of the Soviet economy as being roughly 1/3rd the size of the US economy, rather than the CIA's estimate of roughly 50%. His findings included an estimated 1% year-on-year decline in the living standards of Soviet citizens from the early 1970's onwards.

== Reception ==
Reviewing the book for the journal Slavic Review in the summer of 1992, Anders Åslund described the book as a "the most important contribution to quantitative studies of the Soviet economy since Abram Bergson's work in the 1950s" and said that "with this book Dmitri Steinberg has established his world leadership in the sphere of Soviet economic statistics". Marie Lavigne, of the Paris Institut de Sciences Mathématiques et Economiques Appliquées, reviewing the book for Europe-Asia Studies in 1997, stated that the book "should be of great interest to all scholars who study the Soviet economy in retrospect".
