= Bhaskar Chakravorti =

American economics scholar and consultant (born 1959)

- Born: November 4, 1959 (age 66); India
- Education: St. Stephen's College, Delhi (A.B.); Delhi School of Economics (M.A.); Delhi University; University of Rochester (Ph.D.)
- Spouse: Gita Rao
- Children: 2
- Scientific career
- Fields: Strategy, Innovation, International Business
- Workplaces: The Fletcher School of Law and Diplomacy
- Thesis: Information, incentives and rational expectations (1987)

Bhaskar Chakravorti (born November 4, 1959) is an economics scholar and consultant. Since 2011 he has been the Dean of Global Business at The Fletcher School, Tufts University, and the executive director of Fletcher's Institute for Business in the Global Context (IBGC). He teaches innovation, entrepreneurship, and strategic management.

He previously worked as a consultant and partner at McKinsey & Company, and was a faculty member at the University of Illinois at Urbana-Champaign, Harvard Business School, and Harvard University Center for the Environment. His early articles in Harvard Business Reviews on the impact of demonetization in India received criticism from the readers on his views. Some claimed his article proved prophetic as they believe because some warnings apparently came through and were served up as advice on what other countries should learn from what he claimed was failed demonetization in India.

== Education ==
Chakravorti pursued education in economics first as an undergraduate at Delhi's St. Stephen's College, and then as a masters student at the Delhi School of Economics. He then went on to attain a PhD from the University of Rochester, completing his thesis Information, incentives and rational expectations in 1987.

Chakravorti also participated in TAS (Tata Administrative Services), a program by the Tata Group described as a "talent pipeline of leaders".

== Career ==
=== Corporate ===
Chakravorti worked as a partner consultant and corporate researcher at McKinsey & Company, and at the Monitor Group. His areas of focus included Innovation and Global Forces practices, and Knowledge Services. He also conducted game theory research at Bellcore, the telecommunication research and development company created as part of the break-up of AT&T.

=== Academic ===
Chakravorti has been involved with several academic institutions, having been an assistant professor at the University of Illinois at Urbana-Champaign, a speaker at Massachusetts Institute of Technology's Legatum Center for Development and Entrepreneurship, and a faculty member at Harvard Business School and Harvard University Center for the Environment, where he taught innovation and entrepreneurship.

Later on he joined The Fletcher School of Law and Diplomacy, Tufts University, teaching innovation, entrepreneurship, and strategic management. He also serves as Dean of Global Business at the Fletcher School.

In 2011 he founded the Institute for Business in the Global Context (IBGC), to serve as the umbrella department to host the school's international business education and research. Within it incorporated the school's Master in International Business, and the Council on Emerging Market Enterprises, a research think-tank .

Chakravorti defined the purpose of IBGC as "creating cross-linkages between business and the broader contextual factors that affect business and vice versa", adding that subjects could include "geography, history, cross-border issues, security questions, diplomacy and cultural issues." He argued that Fletcher School's unique approach to business lies in that "there is a lot of overlap of business decisions with the public policy arena and issues like international trade, peace and conflict, humanitarian issues, inclusive growth issues. These are not the kind of topics that business schools normally talk about".

He also serves on the Global Agenda Council on the Economics of Innovation for the World Economic Forum.

== Personal life ==
Chakravorti is originally from India. He is married to Gita Rao. They live in Brookline, Massachusetts, and have two children.

== Select publications ==
=== Book ===
- The Slow Pace of Fast Change: Bringing Innovations to Market in a Connected World (Harvard Business School Press, 2003)

=== Articles ===
- Finding Competitive Advantage in Adversity (Harvard Business Review, November 2010)
- From Oxfam to Exxon, UNICEF to Unilever, CARE to Carrefour: What Lessons Can Development Aid Organizations Pass On to International Businesses about Succeeding in Emerging Markets? (Yale Journal of International Affairs, 2012)
- The End of the World Wide Web? (CNN, 2013)
- Cash Is a Wasteful System, but Hard to Replace (The New York Times, 2013)
- How Business Schools Create Irresponsible Leaders (Bloomberg BusinessWeek, 2014)
- The Hidden Costs of Cash (Harvard Business Review, 2014)
- Where the Digital Economy Is Moving the Fastest (Harvard Business Review, 2015)
- The Way to Estonia: How to Reach Digital Nirvana (Foreign Affairs, 2015)
- The Unintended Consequences of Inclusive Business (Forbes, 2015)
- Business Growth for Good: Why Context Matters (Stanford Social Innovation Review, 2015)
- Europe's Other Crisis: A Digital Recession (Harvard Business Review, 2015)
- The problem with the endless discussion of disruptive innovation (The Washington Post, 2015)
- Transcending Boundaries through Contextual Intelligence: Why Business Schools Need to Catch Up with Reality (The Huffington Post, 2016)
- The Countries That Would Profit Most from a Cashless World (Harvard Business Review, 2016)
- Sustainable business and sustainable development: two sides of the same coin (The Guardian, 2016)
- The cost of cash in the United States, (co-authored with Ben Mazzotta) (Institute for Business in the Global Context, 2013)
