= Nadim Shehadi =

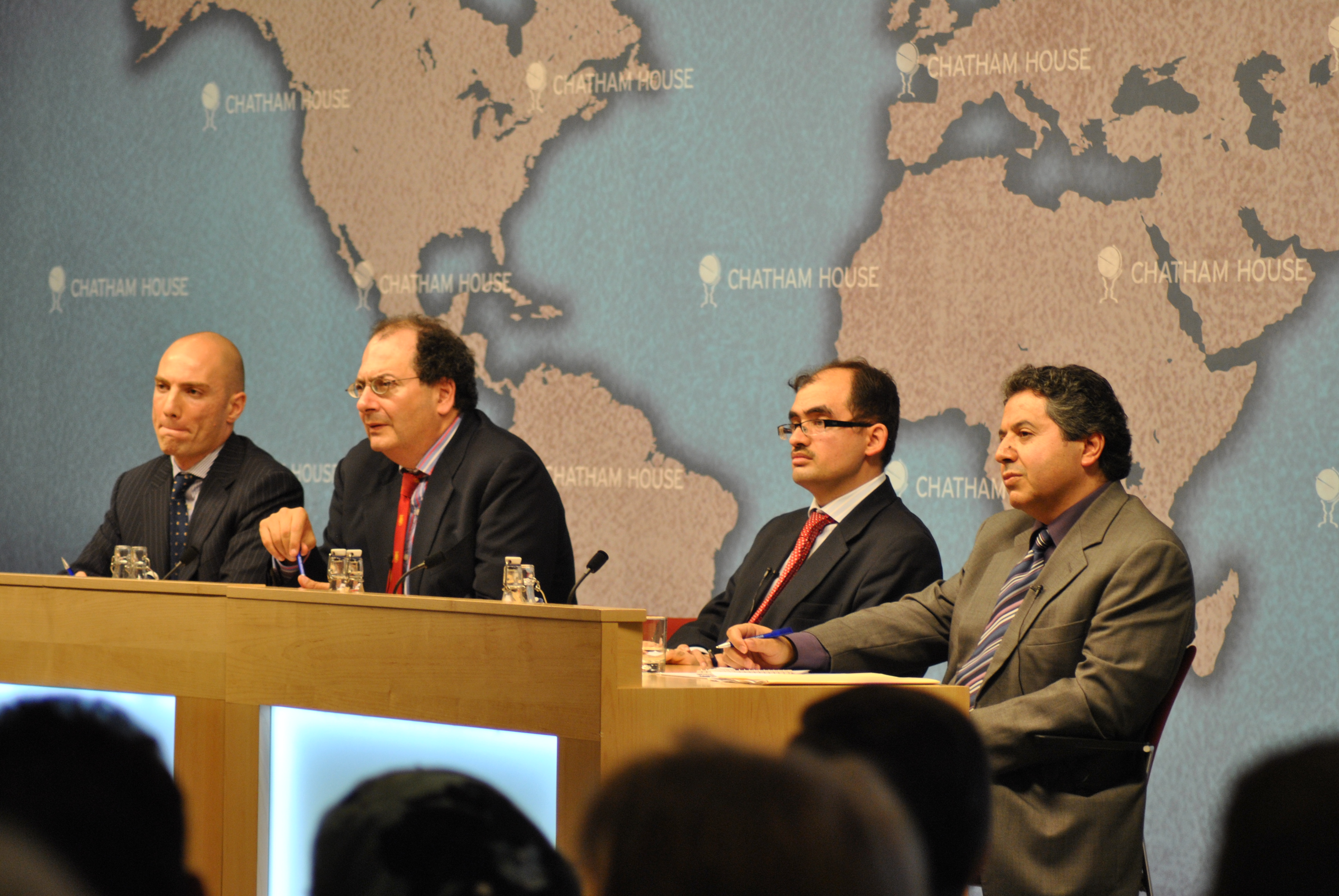
Ausama Monajed, Nadim Shehadi, Radwan Ziadeh and Najib Ghadbian at Chatham House (June 2011)

Nadim Shehadi (born 11 February 1956) is the current Executive Director of Lebanese American University's New York Headquarters & Academic Center and an Associate Fellow at Chatham House where he was formerly head of the Middle East program. He was previously director of The Fares Center for Eastern Mediterranean Studies at the Fletcher School of Law and Diplomacy at Tufts University.

From 1986 to 2005, Shehadi served as the director of Lebanese Studies at St. Antony's College, Oxford University. He has also been engaged by the European Union to provide his expertise on the MENA region. He is a member of the executive board of the Centro de Estudios de Oriente Medio of the Fundacion Promocion Social de la Cultura in Madrid. In 2010 he was a visiting fellow at the Aspen Institute in Washington DC, and in the summer semester of 2012 he was a visiting scholar at Tufts University. He is also a consultant to several governments and international organizations. He trained as an economist with an interest in the history of economic thought. He is a leading scholar on MENA affairs and his articles have been published by major international news outlets like The New York Times, The Guardian and CNN.

== Education ==
Shehadi received his Bachelor of Arts degree from the University of Kent and a Master's degree from the University of Leicester in 1980. His research interests include Arab Spring, Middle East Peace Process, History of Economic Thought, Lebanese History, Culture and Society.

== Books ==
Nadim Shehadi and Albert Hourani jointly edited the book The Lebanese and the World: A Century of Emigration, a collection of essays based on papers delivered at a conference on Lebanese Emigration organised by the Centre for Lebanese Studies in Oxford. For more than a century, people have been emigrating from countries of the Mediterranean basin - Spain, Italy, Sicily, Greece and parts of the Near East - to the New World of America and Australasia. This emigration has formed an important part of the international movement of population which is one of the features of the modern world.

This book deals with one specific movement, that of emigrants from Lebanon who have established communities in North and South America, the Caribbean, Australia and West Africa, and more recently in the Persian Gulf and other parts of the Middle East.The chapters were written by historians, economists, sociologists and political scientists, coming from various backgrounds and disciplines. They attempt to evaluate the impact of the emigrants from Lebanon on the host societies, the process of integration, their economic, political and cultural significance, as well as their relations with the home country and their contribution to its development.

He co-authored a book on The Origins of the Druze People and Religion with Philip Hitti. He also wrote the foreword for Lebanon, Lebanon, Anna Wilson's book on the children living in appalling conditions in Lebanon since the outbreak of war in July 2006.

== Professional associations ==
- Director Centre for Lebanese Studies, Oxford (1986-2005)
- Executive Board member at Centro de Estudios de Oriente Medio de la Fundación
- British International Studies Association (BISA)
- Middle East Studies Association (MESA)
- British Society for Middle Eastern Studies (BRISMES)
- Royal Institute of International Affairs (Chatham House)
- Institute for Economic Affairs (IEA)
- EUROMESCO network
- Board of advisors for AHL: Archaeology and History in Lebanon
- Board of The Reform Agenda, London
- Editorial board of Tempora, Annales d’histoire et d’archéologie at St Joseph University in Beirut
- Editorial Board of the Levantine Review
