= Franklyn D. Holzman =

- Holzman in 1974
- Born: Circa 1918-19
- Died: 1 September 2002
- Known for: Estimates of Soviet military spending, Soviet economics

Academic background
- Education: Harvard University

Academic work
- Institutions: Tufts University, UCLA, MIT, Columbia University, University of Washington

Franklyn Dunn Holzman (born circa 1918-19, died 1 September 2002) was an American economist specialising in the field of Sovietology.

== Early life ==
Holzman graduated with a degree in economics from the University of North Carolina in 1940, and subsequently joined the US Army Air Corps. During the Second World War he was based at Poltava in Ukraine as part of a joint US-Soviet air base supporting the Allied bombing of Berlin. It was there that he developed an interest in Soviet culture and the Soviet economy. Whilst in Poltava Holzman had a relationship with a local woman that was ended suddenly at the instruction of the secret police.

== Academic career ==
Following the war Holzman started his post-graduate studies at Harvard, studying under Alexander Gerschenkron and Wassily Leontief. Holzman eventually grantuated with a PhD from Harvard. Whilst their he married a fellow student, Mathilda Wiesman Holzman.

From 1961 to 1990 he was a professor of economics at Tufts at the Fletcher School of Law and Diplomacy. Whilst there he became a critic of CIA estimates of Soviet Military spending, which he believed were being over-stated in order to justify the military budgets of the Reagan administration. He died from a stroke in 2002. Holzman also taught at the University of Washington, the Massachusetts Institute of Technology, Columbia, and UCLA. In 1977 he was made president of the Association for Comparative Economic Studies. Holzman consulted for US government bodies including the State Department, the Department of Commerce, the Department of the Treasury, and the Presidential Commission on Trade and Investment Policy. Additionally Holzman consulted for the UN Economic and Social Council.
