= Fletcher School of Law and Diplomacy =

Global affairs school at Tufts University

Coordinates: 42°24′28″N 71°07′18″W

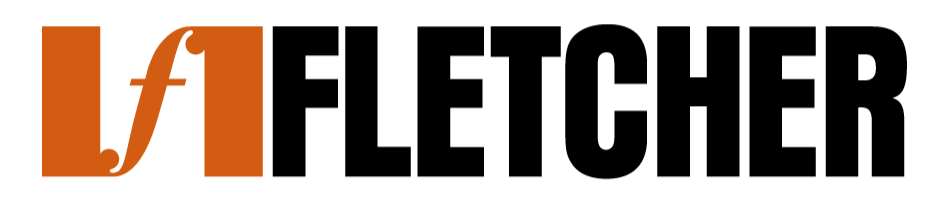
- Type: Private
- Established: 1933
- Parent institution: Tufts University (1933–); Harvard University (1933–1935)
- Affiliations: APSIA; UArctic
- Faculty: 98
- Students: 500
- Location: Medford, Massachusetts, U.S.
- Colors: Orange and Black
- Website: fletcher.tufts.edu

The Fletcher School of Law and Diplomacy is the graduate school for international relations at Tufts University in Medford, Massachusetts, United States.

Fletcher is one of America's oldest and most distinguished graduate schools of international relations. It currently enrolls approximately 500 students, of whom 44 percent are international students drawn from 80 countries worldwide.

== History ==
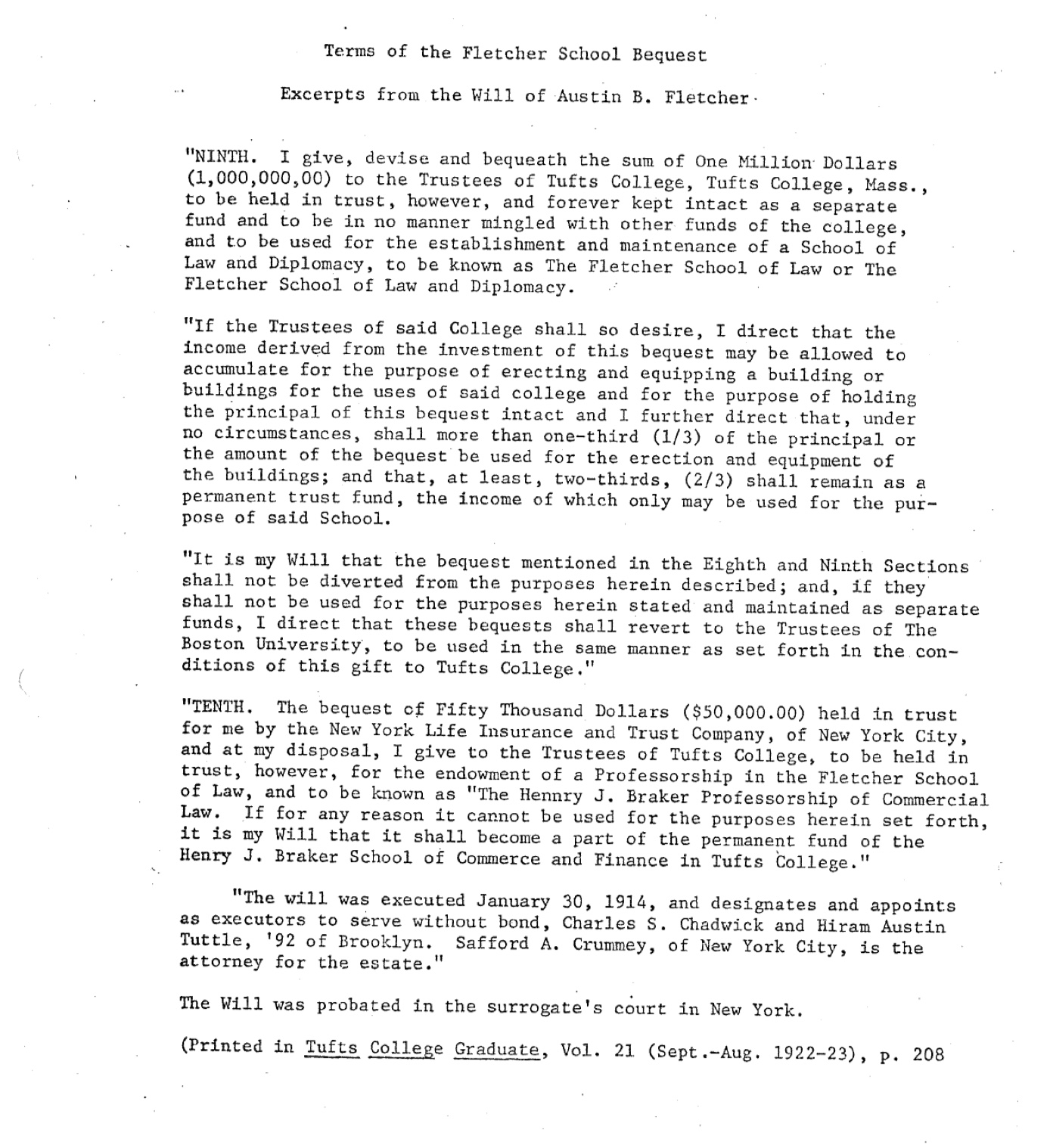
Excerpts from the Will of Austin B. Fletcher Fletcher's early twentieth century academic seal

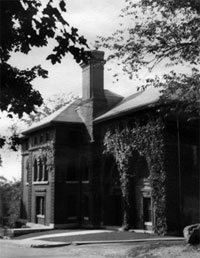
Goddard Hall, 1939

The Fletcher School of Law and Diplomacy was founded in 1933 with the bequest of Austin Barclay Fletcher, who left over $3 million to Tufts University upon his death in 1923. A third of these funds were dedicated "for the establishment and maintenance of a School of Law and Diplomacy, to be known as The Fletcher School of Law or "The Fletcher School of Law and Diplomacy." Fletcher envisioned "a school to prepare people for diplomatic service and to teach such matters as they come...[and] within it...a fundamental and thorough knowledge of the principles of international law upon which diplomacy is founded...[and] also a knowledge of many things of a geographic and economic nature which affect relations between nations."

The Fletcher School of Law and Diplomacy thereafter opened in 1933 under the joint administration of Harvard University and Tufts College. One of the first buildings acquired was Goddard Hall, which was converted into a library. Tufts College assumed exclusive responsibility for the administration of The Fletcher School of Law and Diplomacy in 1935. Between 1963 and 1965, Mugar Hall was constructed and later renovated in 2016 to serve the expanding needs of Fletcher.

Since 2020, the school has de-emphasized its "Law and Diplomacy" mandate. Tufts University usually refers to it as "the Fletcher School." Its academic focus is weighted to climate activism and social justice. Only about one-third of graduates go on to government diplomacy roles.

In 2026, the school was designated as an undesirable organization in Russia.

== Academics ==
On its campus in Medford, Massachusetts, the Fletcher School of Law & Diplomacy offers multi-disciplinary instruction in international affairs through several master's degree programs and a Ph.D. program. Regardless of the degree program in which they are enrolled, students have the opportunity to select from among more than 170 courses across three divisions: International Law and Organization (ILO); Diplomacy, History and Politics (DHP); and Economics and International Business (EIB).

The school has eleven degree programs: its flagship two-year Master of Arts in Law and Diplomacy (MALD); a one-year Master of Arts for mid-career professionals; a one-year, mid-career Master of Arts (via the Global Master of Arts Program) that combines online and residential learning; a Ph.D. program; a Master of International Business (MIB); a Master of Global Business Administration, an online program combining the study of business with international affairs; and a Master of Laws (LL.M.) in International Law. Additionally, there are several joint and dual degree and certificate programs.

Fletcher students complete a capstone project during their final year for students in 2-year programs or their final semester for students in 1-year programs. The capstone project is expected to demonstrate scholarly and/or professional analysis, and it acts as an opportunity for students to draw on their methodological, analytical, and substantive learning in a comprehensive written study. In consultation with faculty advisors, the specific form of the final project can differ widely.

The school's Global Master of Arts Program (GMAP) is unique amongst international relations degrees. The year-long program combines three 2-week residencies (two at The Fletcher School and one at a different international location each year) with instruction covering topics such as negotiation, international business and economic law, international trade, economics and politics from a global perspective.

Tufts Fletcher rankings

Global
Foreign Policy – Master's	4
Foreign Policy – PhD	12
QS – Politics	75

United States
Niche – International Relations	9

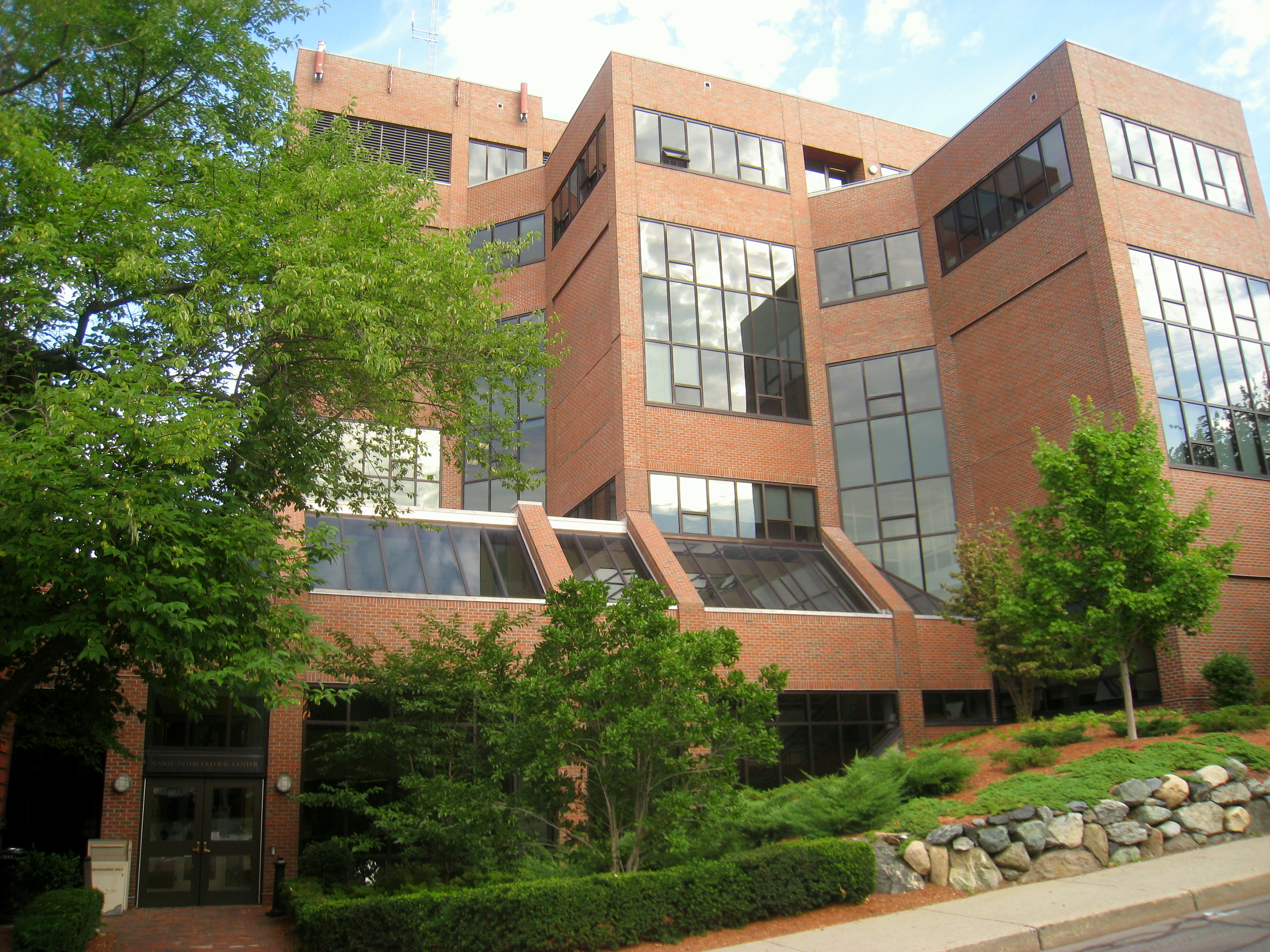
Cabot Intercultural Center, 2010

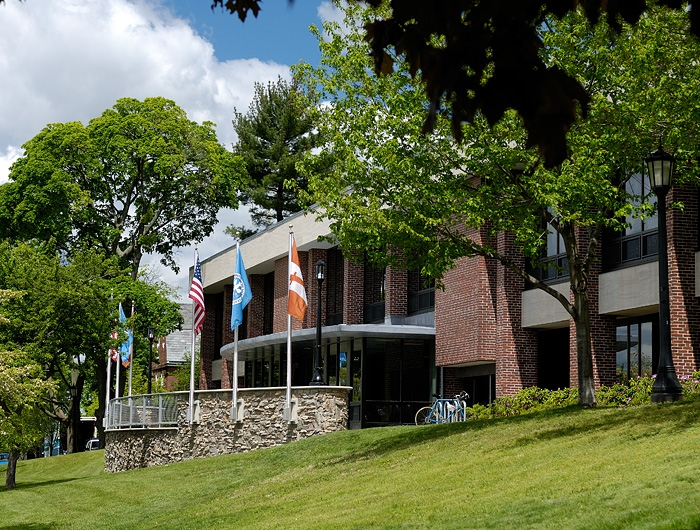
Mugar Hall, 2009

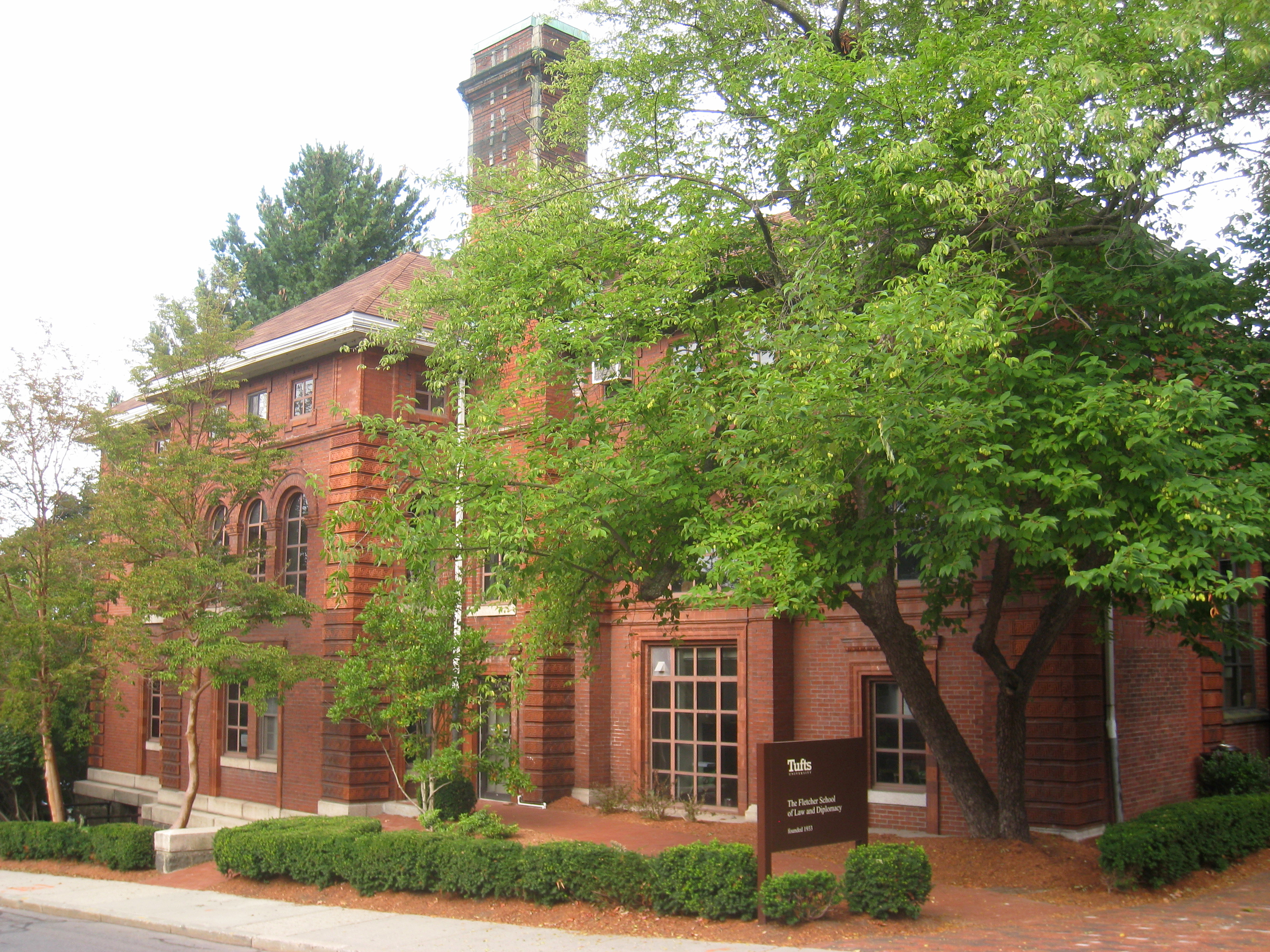
Goddard Hall, 2010

== Research ==
Fletcher has several research centers and institutes, including:

- The Center for International Environment and Resource Policy (CIERP) conducts interdisciplinary and policy-relevant research on pressing environmental issues.
- The Center for International Law and Governance focused on the study of global governance
- The Center for Strategic Studies conducts policy-relevant research on strategy and international politics
- The Edward R. Murrow Center of Public Diplomacy was established in memory of the journalist and former head of the United States Information Agency.
- The Fares Center for Eastern Mediterranean Studies organizes public lectures, conferences, and roundtables to create a greater understanding of the region and its challenges.
- The Hitachi Center for Technology and International Affairs focuses on the management of innovation and technological change and the advancement of economic and financial integration.
- The Institute for Business in the Global Context (IBGC) conducts research and organizes interdisciplinary conferences on contemporary issues in international business.
- The Henry J. Leir Institute for Migration and Human Security promotes research and education at the intersection between humanitarianism, development, human rights, and conflict resolution.
- The International Security Studies Program (ISSP) advances ideas in national and global security studies, including strategy, defense, conflict, intelligence and political-military relations.
- The World Peace Foundation, provides intellectual leadership on issues of peace, justice, and security of foreign parties, and provides financial support only for projects that it has initiated itself.

=== Affiliated programs ===
- The Center for South Asian and Indian Ocean Studies
- The Global Development and Environmental Institute
- Refugees and Forced Migration Program

=== International collaboration ===
Fletcher is an active member of the University of the Arctic. UArctic is an international cooperative network based in the Circumpolar Arctic region, consisting of more than 200 universities, colleges, and other organizations with an interest in promoting education and research in the Arctic region.

=== Publications ===
- The Fletcher Forum of World Affairs, a student-managed foreign policy journal, founded in 1975 and published biannually.
- Fletcher Security Review, an online and print journal focused on security studies.
- PRAXIS: The Fletcher Journal of Human Security, an annual peer-reviewed academic journal covering human security produced in collaboration with Fletcher's Institute for Human Security. It was established in 1981. In 2012 it became an online-only journal. The journal covers a different theme each year. It is produced by Fletcher students in coordination with the school's Institute for Human Security.

== Faculty ==
The Fletcher School of Law & Diplomacy employs more than 30 full-time tenured or tenure-track faculty as well as a variety of adjunct and visiting professors, and benefits from faculty at partner schools within Tufts, including the Friedman School of Nutrition Science and Policy. The full-time Fletcher faculty includes economists, international law theorists, diplomats, historians, and political scientists who hold the academic ranks of professor, associate professor, assistant professor, and lecturer. All faculty members hold terminal degrees in their respective fields (a Ph.D. in the case of historians, political scientists, and economists; and a J.D. in the case of lawyers). In 2013, the faculty to student ratio in Medford was 1:8.6.

=== Notable faculty ===
- Joyce Aluoch, Judge of the International Criminal Court in The Hague.
- Carlos Alvarado Quesada, Professor of Practice of Diplomacy, 48th President of the Republic of Costa Rica.
- Bhaskar Chakravorti, Senior Associate Dean, International Business & Finance, Director, Institute for Business in the Global Context.
- Antonia Chayes, Professor of International Politics and Law, former United States Under Secretary of the Air Force.
- Alex de Waal, famine and development scholar, East African politics expert, anthropologist, and director of the World Peace Foundation at the Fletcher School.
- Daniel W. Drezner, Professor of International Politics, regular featured columnist in Foreign Policy and The Washington Post.
- Leila Fawaz, Issam M. Fares Professor of Lebanese and Eastern Mediterranean Studies, Carnegie Scholar.
- Kelly Sims Gallagher, Dean and Professor of Energy and Environmental Policy; appointed the 15th Dean of The Fletcher School in September 2024, she also directs the Climate Policy Lab and the Center for International Environment and Resource Policy.
- Francesca Giovannini, nuclear security expert and former MacArthur Nuclear Postdoctoral Fellow at the Center for International Security and Cooperation (CISAC) at Stanford University.
- Michael J. Glennon, Professor of International Law, former legal counsel to Senate Foreign Relations Committee.
- Maidin Hashim, Bruneian permanent representative to the United Nations, high commissioner to the United Kingdom and ambassador to Germany.
- Franklyn D. Holzman, noted economist and Sovietologist who criticised especially CIA estimates of Soviet military spending.
- Ayesha Jalal, Professor of History and the Director of the Center for South Asian and Indian Ocean Studies, former MacArthur Fellow.
- Susan Landau, Professor in Cyber Security and Policy.
- Sung-Yoon Lee, Kim Koo-Korea Foundation Assistant Professor of Korean Studies, former research fellow at the National Asia Research Program, author of The Sister: North Korea's Kim Yo Jong, the Most Dangerous Woman in the World.
- Chris Miller, Professor of International History, economic historian, and author of Chip Wars: The Fight for the World's Most Critical Technology, winner of the 2022 Financial Times Business Book of the Year award.
- William Moomaw, Professor of International Environmental Policy, lead author of the Nobel Prize-winning Intergovernmental Panel on Climate Change, developed the concept of New diplomacy.
- Dr. Shahid Masood, Pakistani TV Journalist, an anchorperson, and a medical doctor.
- Chidi Odinkalu, Professor of Practice in International Human Rights Law, chair for the Nigerian Truth, Justice, and Peace Commission for South-East Nigeria, previous chair of Nigeria’s National Human Rights Commission.
- Klaus Scharioth, Professor of Practice, former German Ambassador to the US and State Secretary of the German Foreign Office.
- Patrick Webb, Alexander McFarlane Professor of Nutrition, Policy and Evidence Adviser to the Global Panel on Agriculture and Food Systems for Nutrition, former Dean for Academic Affairs at the Friedman School of Nutrition Science and Policy at Tufts University, former Chief of Nutrition for the United Nations World Food Programme, Steering Committee member for the UN Committee on World Food Security.
- Nadim Rouhana, Professor of International Affairs and Conflict Studies, expert on the Israeli-Palestinian conflict, and Director of the Fares Center at the Fletcher School.
- John Shattuck, Professor of Practice in Diplomacy, former U.S. Assistant Secretary of State for Democracy, Human Rights and Labor, former U.S. Ambassador to the Czech Republic, fourth president and rector of Central European University (CEU), member of the Council on Foreign Relations, and a fellow of the American Academy of Arts and Sciences.
- Richard H. Shultz, Professor of International Security and Politics, nuclear security and artificial intelligence expert, Senior Fellow to the U.S. Special Operations Command’s Joint Special Operations University.
- Tara D. Sonenshine, Edward R. Murrow Professor of Practice in Public Diplomacy, former U.S. under secretary of state for public diplomacy and public affairs, former Executive Vice President of the United States Institute of Peace.
- James Stavridis (Admiral, Retired), 12th Dean of the Fletcher School of Law and Diplomacy, Commander of United States Southern Command and United States European Command, and the first United States Navy Admiral to be appointed NATO Supreme Allied Commander Europe.
- Ibrahim Warde, Professor of International Business.

== Notable alumni ==
The Fletcher School has over 9,500 alumni living around the world in 140 countries, including hundreds of sitting ambassadors, award-winning journalists and authors, global business executives and leaders of international peacekeeping, humanitarian and security initiatives.
