= The Fares Center for Eastern Mediterranean Studies =

Coordinates: 42°24′28″N 71°07′18″W

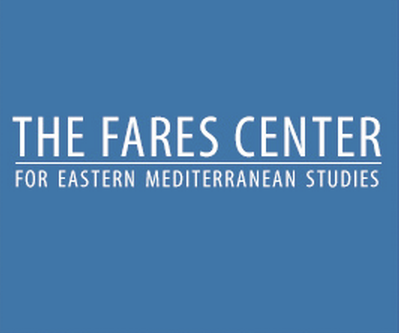
- Formation: 2001
- Founder: Leila Fawaz
- Type: Academic organization
- Location: Medford, Massachusetts
- Fields: Regional studies of the Eastern Mediterranean
- Director: Nadim Rouhana
- Parent organization: The Fletcher School of Law and Diplomacy, Tufts University
- Website: fletcher.tufts.edu/farescenter

The Fares Center for Eastern Mediterranean Studies is an interdisciplinary education and research organization founded in 2001, devoted to the regional study of the Eastern Mediterranean within the greater Middle East. The Center is part of The Fletcher School of Law and Diplomacy, at Tufts University. Its aim is the study and understanding the heritage of the Eastern Mediterranean and the challenges it faces in the twenty-first century, being at the crossroads between the academic and policy world.

== Activities ==
The founding director defined the goal of the center as the pursuit of a cross-regional and cross-cultural analysis, fostering the encounter of a diversity of viewpoints, with the belief that a broad diversity of views serves as an effective means of conflict resolution. The center aims to foster greater understanding of the Middle East to students, notably through studying relationships between the groups involved in Middle Eastern conflicts.

Initially the regional focus was on Jordan, Lebanon, and Syria, and the neighboring countries of Cyprus, Egypt, Greece, Iran, Iraq, Israel, and Turkey. Later on the focus was broadened to also include other countries in the greater Middle East and North Africa regions.

The center hosts scholars conducting research and offering courses on the region. Fares also serves as a forum, organizing events such as conferences, for the discussion of policy issues from an international perspective, welcoming both for scholars within the school as well as reaching out to guest speakers. The center includes numerous events organized by the school's Mediterranean Club.

The Center has served as the organizer of the Issam M. Fares Lecture series, a renowned forum endowed by the Fares' foundations since 1993 and attended by thousands of students. Past notable speakers included former British Prime Ministers Margaret Thatcher and Tony Blair; former President of France Valéry Giscard d'Estaing; former U.S. Secretaries of State James Baker, Madeleine Albright, Colin Powell and Hillary Clinton; and former U.S. Presidents George H. W. Bush and Bill Clinton.

== History ==
The Fares Center was established in 2001 with the financial support of Issam M. Fares, a Lebanese businessman, deputy prime minister of Lebanon, Tufts trustee emeritus, and a member of Tufts’ International Board of Overseers and the Board of Overseers for Arts & Sciences. The dedication of the Center took place in March 2002, with President Bill Clinton speaking at the event.

Leila Fawaz was the founding director of the Center, from 2001 to 2012. Nadim Shehadi succeeded her taking over in 2015. Before Vali Nasr became dean of the School of Advanced International Studies at Johns Hopkins University in 2012, he held the position of associate director at the Fares Center.

It was reported in 2002 that the Center had acquired a ceramic photo mural from the Arab American female artist Wasma'a Khalid Chorbachi. The artwork is displayed by the entrance of the center.

== Directors ==
=== Leila Fawaz (2001–2012) ===
The founding director of the Center was Leila Fawaz, who remained in that position until 2012. Fawaz was born in Sudan to Greek-Orthodox Lebanese parents and raised in Lebanon. She took two degrees at the American University of Beirut between 1967 and 1968 and pursued graduate studies in history at Harvard between 1972 and 1979.

She became a member of the Tufts faculty in 1979, and became a full professor in 1994. She chaired the History Department from 1994 to 1996. From 1996 to 2001, she served as dean of arts and humanities and as associate dean of the faculty. At Tufts Fawaz became the Issam M. Fares Professor of Lebanese and Eastern Mediterranean Studies, where she also held appointments as professor of diplomacy at the Fletcher School of Law and Diplomacy and as professor of history.

From 1990 to 1994 she Fawaz was the editor-in-chief of The International Journal of Middle East Studies, there she advanced the notion of conducting analytical and comparative research, with an international and cross-disciplinary approach. She bemoaned the overspecialization within the field, the neglect of attention to humanities/arts and, uninteresting writing, and linked these problems to Middle East studies as a whole, because researchers were "still a long way from being pathfinders in the world of scholarship generally."

Fawaz also served on the editorial board of The American Historical Review. A former president of the Middle East Studies Association of North America, a member of the Council on Foreign Relations, and a member of the Comité Scientifique of the Maison Méditerranéenne des Sciences de l’Homme at the Université de Provence. Fawaz served on the board of overseers of Harvard University from 1996 to 2012.

In 2012 she was named a "chevalier" in the French National Order of the Legion of Honor. She was honored for her "exemplary personal commitment to French-American relations" and for her efforts to promote French academic research and thought at prestigious American universities."

=== Nadim Shehadi (2015–2018) ===
In 2015 Nadim Shehadi was appointed the second director of the Fares Center. Shehadi trained as an economist with an interest in the history of economic thought. He served as the director of Lebanese studies at St Antony's College, Oxford, where he was director of the Centre for Lebanese Studies from 1986 to 2005, and worked for the European Union writing foreign policy and creating strategies for relations with the Middle East and North Africa. At the time of his appointment, Shehadi stated his intent to continue to serve as an associate fellow of the London-based think tank Chatham House, where he is the director of a program focused on Palestinian refugees in the Middle East.

At the time of Shehadi's appointment, Fletcher's Academic Dean Ian Johnstone stated that Shehadi's experience directing research programs, working as a policymaker and advisor, and as a commentator for various media outlets, made him a good choice for the role, adding that “Fletcher prides itself on multidisciplinary research, and the Fares Center is a microcosm for that”.

=== Ibrahim Warde (2018–2020) ===
Ibrahim Warde served as Interim Director of the Fares Center from 2018 to 2020. Warde is professor of international business at The Fletcher School and has previously taught at the University of California, Berkeley, and MIT’s Sloan School of Management. He was a Carnegie scholar focusing on informal finance in the Islamic World and is a regular contributor to Le Monde Diplomatique.

As Interim Director of Fares, Warde brought numerous high profile speakers to Fletcher including His Excellency Yusuf Kalla, Prince Moulay Hicham of Morocco, and President and CEO of Oxfam America Abby Maxman. Warde currently serves on the Academic Committee of the Fares Center, and is an affiliated faculty.

=== Nadim N. Rouhana (since 2020) ===
Nadim Rouhana was appointed third director of the Fares Center in September 2020 under Fletcher Dean Rachel Kyte. Rouhana is professor of international affairs and conflict studies and Director of the Program on International Negotiation and Conflict Resolution at The Fletcher School.

Dr. Rouhana's research includes work on the Israeli-Palestinian conflict, the dynamics of protracted social conflict, collective identity and democratic citizenship in multi-ethnic states, and settler colonialism. His most recent books include the co-edited volume "When Politics Are Sacralized: Comparative Perspectives on Religious Claims and Nationalism" (Cambridge University Press, 2021), and the edited volume "Israel and its Palestinian Citizens: Ethnic Privileges in the Jewish State" (Cambridge University Press, 2017).

Dr. Rouhana is also an affiliate faculty at the Harvard Program on Negotiation at Harvard Law School and founding director at the Mada al-Carmel–Arab Center for Applied Social Research in Haifa.

== Faculty Associated with the Center ==
- Leila Fawaz
- Vali Nasr
- Ibrahim Warde
- Beatrice Forbes Manz

== Select publications ==
=== Books ===
- Warde, Ibrahim (2007). The Price of Fear: The Truth Behind the Financial War on Terror. University of California Press. ISBN 9780520253704.
- Nasr, Vali (April 17, 2007). The Shia Revival: How Conflicts within Islam Will Shape the Future. New York: W. W. Norton & Company. ISBN 978-0393329681.
- Hoffman, Eva R., ed. (April 23, 2007). Late Antique and Medieval Art of the Mediterranean. Wiley-Blackwell. ISBN 978-1405120722.
- Mansour, Camille; Fawaz, Leila, eds. (May 15, 2009). Transformed Landscapes: Essays on Palestine and the Middle East in Honor of Walid Khalidi. The American University in Cairo Press. ISBN 978-9774162473.
- Manz, Beatrice Forbes (June 2010). Power, Politics and Religion in Timurid Iran. Cambridge University Press. ISBN 9780521153461.
- Nasr, Vali (June 8, 2010). The Rise of Islamic Capitalism: Why the New Muslim Middle Class Is the Key to Defeating Extremism. Council on Foreign Relations Books. ISBN 978-1416589693.
- Fawaz, Leila Tarazi (November 17, 2014). A Land of Aching Hearts: The Middle East in the Great War. Harvard University Press. ISBN 978-0674735491.

=== Lighting the path to understanding series ===
The Fares Center has organized an annual conference after which it has compiled its participants' contributions, and published a report within the series Lighting the path to understanding. Below is a list of these publications.

- "Engaging the Middle East: After the Cairo Speech". Occasional Paper. 7. The Fares Center for Eastern Mediterranean Studies. 2010. OCLC 759440780.
- Khouri, Rami G. (2010). "New and Old Elements of Power and Politics in the Middle East". Occasional Paper. 6. The Fares Center for Eastern Mediterranean Studies. OCLC 727121352.
- "Foreign Policy Challenges for the New Administration: Iran and the Middle East". Occasional Paper. 5. The Fares Center for Eastern Mediterranean Studies. 2009. OCLC 469772102.
- "The United States and the Middle East: What Comes Next After Iraq". Occasional Paper. 4. The Fares Center for Eastern Mediterranean Studies. 2008. OCLC 286970793.
- "The "War On Terrorism": Where Do We Stand?". Occasional Paper. 3. The Fares Center for Eastern Mediterranean Studies. 2007. OCLC 654959664.
- "Democratizing The Middle East?". Occasional Paper. 2. The Fares Center for Eastern Mediterranean Studies. 2006. OCLC 85821909.
- "Engaging In Dialogue on U.S. Foreign Policy". Occasional Paper. 1. The Fares Center for Eastern Mediterranean Studies. 2004. OCLC 62757361.
