= Ibrahim Warde =

International finance scholar and consultant

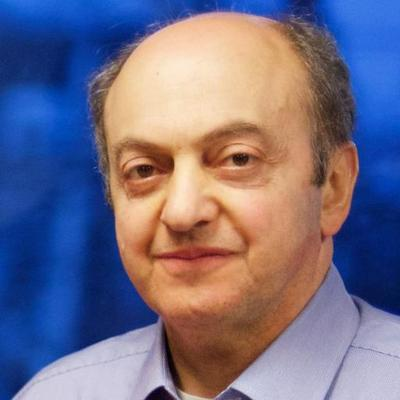
- Warde in 2018
- Born: July 3, 1953 (age 73); Beirut, Lebanon
- Citizenship: Lebanon; United States; France

Academic background
- Education: Saint Joseph University (BA); HEC Paris (MBA); University of California, Berkeley (MA, PhD)

Academic work
- Main interests: Finance, Islamic finance, Regulation, Financial compliance, Political economy, Middle Eastern politics, Informal economy, Illicit finance
- Website: Official Website

Ibrahim A. Warde (Arabic: إبراهيم أنطوان وردة) is a scholar and consultant in the fields of international finance and political economy. His consulting work consists of advisory services, expert witness testimony, and professional seminars on financial regulation and compliance, business ethics, islamic finance, and Middle Eastern political economy for government agencies, financial institutions, investment funds, and multinational corporations.

Warde is a Carnegie Scholar and the author of several books, which include The Price of Fear: The Truth Behind the Financial War on Terror and Islamic Finance in the Global Economy. He is also a writer for the French monthly newspaper Le Monde Diplomatique. In addition to his writings, Warde teaches and is Adjunct Professor of International Business at The Fletcher School of Law and Diplomacy at Tufts University, where he previously served as the director of the Fares Center for Eastern Mediterranean Studies. He currently serves the academic director of the Robinson Fund for business diplomacy between the United States and the Arab World.

== Education ==
Warde attended Saint Joseph University in Beirut and graduated with a BA and later earned an MBA from Ecole des Hautes Etudes Commerciales (HEC). Warde also holds an MA and a PhD in Political Science from University of California, Berkeley.

== Career ==
Aside from his consulting work and publications, Warde also teaches graduate-level courses on international finance, Islamic finance, financial regulation, and political economy. He is currently an Adjunct Professor at The Fletcher School of Law and Diplomacy at Tufts University. He has also taught at the Sloan School of Management at MIT, and the University of California, Berkeley, Davis, and Santa Cruz.

== Books authored ==
- Islamic Finance in the Global Economy (Edinburgh University Press, 2013) ISBN 978-0748627776
- The Price of Fear: The Truth behind the Financial War on Terror, (University of California Press, 2007) ISBN 978-1850434245
- Mythologies américaines, co-authored with Marie Agnès Combesque ( Le Félin, 2002) ISBN 978-2866454678
- Le modèle Anglo-Saxon en question, co-authored with Richard Farnetti (Economica, 1997)ISBN 978-2717834369
