= Matthew Evangelista =

American academic

- Awards: Marshall Shulman Prize, Jervis-Schroeder Prize

Academic work
- Discipline: Sovietology, international affairs
- Institutions: Pushkin Institute of Russian Language, Harvard University, University of Michigan, Cornell University

Matthew Evangelista is an American academic specialising in the field of Soviet, Russian, and international affairs.

== Biography ==
Evangelista first travelled to Russia to study Russian at the Pushkin Institute, graduating from there with a certificate in Russian language in 1977. Evangelista subsequently studied Russian History and Literature at Harvard before doing his master's degree and doctorate in government at Cornell. Evangelista spent ten years on the faculty at the University of Michigan before joining the faculty of the Department of Government at Cornell in 1996. In 2006 he was named one of the 101 "dangerous academics" by David Horowitz in his book The Professors: 101 Most Dangerous Academics in America. In 2009 he was made President White Professor of History and Political Science at Cornell.

== Awards ==
In 2000 Evangelista was awarded the Marshall Shulman Book Prize, in 2001 the Jervis-Schroeder Prize.

== Books ==
Evangelista is the author of books including:

- Innovation and the Arms Race: How the United States and the Soviet Union Develop New Military Technologies (Cornell, 1988)
- Unarmed Forces: The Transnational Movement to End the Cold War (Cornell, 1999)
- The Chechen Wars: Will Russia Go The Way Of The Soviet Union? (Brookings, 2002)
