= William Moomaw =

William R. Moomaw
- Citizenship: United States
- Education: Williams College, Massachusetts Institute of Technology(Ph.D.)
- Awards: A lead author of the Nobel Prize-winning Intergovernmental Panel on Climate Change
- Scientific career
- Fields: Chemistry, Environmental policy
- Institutions: The Fletcher School of Law and Diplomacy (emeritus)

William R. Moomaw is the Professor Emeritus of International Environmental Policy at the Fletcher School, Tufts University. Moomaw has worked at the intersection of science and policy, advocating for international sustainable development. His activities have included being a long-time contributor to the Intergovernmental Panel on Climate Change and an author on the seminal "Perspective" paper on proforestation.

== Education and career ==
Moomaw graduated from Williams College in 1959, and in 1965 he earned a Ph.D. in physical chemistry from the Massachusetts Institute of Technology. Moomaw was director of the climate, energy and pollution program for the World Resources Institute in Washington, D.C. Later he joined the faculty of The Fletcher School of Law and Diplomacy, where he was appointed Professor of International Environmental Policy. In 1992 he founded the Center for International Environment and Resource Policy, within the Fletcher School, and remained the director of the center for 22 years, until his retirement in 2013.

== Activities ==
Moomaw has conducted research in areas including sustainable development, renewable energy, trade and environment, technology and policy implications for climate change, water and climate change, economics and geochemistry of the nitrogen cycle, biodiversity, and negotiation strategies for environmental agreements.

Moomaw has been a lead author for several Intergovernmental Panel on Climate Change (IPCC) reports, including being the coordinating lead author of the 2001 chapter on greenhouse gas emissions reduction and a lead author for the 2007 IPCC Fourth Assessment Report Chapter 4: Energy Supply in Mitigation of Climate Change (Working Group III).

As an American Association for the Advancement of Science Congressional Science Fellow, he worked on energy and forestry legislation and on legislation that eliminated American use of CFCs in spray cans to protect the ozone layer. Moomaw also founded the Tufts Climate Initiative and co-founded the Global Development and Environment Institute, and has served on the boards of The Climate Group, Clean Air-Cool Planet, Earthwatch Institute, Center for Ecological Technologies, Woods Hole Research Center, and the Consensus Building Institute. He remains an active advocate and commentator.

Moomaw has also given expert testimony in the U.S. Congress, and written reports for the United Nations.

== Awards ==
In 2007 the Nobel Peace Prize was jointly awarded to the Intergovernmental Panel on Climate Change IPCC and Vice President Al Gore. Moomaw was a lead author for chapters of several IPCC reports, including the 2007 report.

== Publications ==
=== Books ===
- Transboundary Environmental Negotiation: New Approaches to Global Cooperation(co-editor) (2002).
- People and Their Planet: Searching for Balance (co-editor) (1999).
- Innovations in International Environmental Negotiation (co-editor) (1999)
