= List of radio stations in Greece =

Greece has over 1,000 radio stations operating with a certificate of temporary legality. Most broadcast on the FM band; the AM band has been almost entirely abandoned by broadcasters, with the exception of State-run media and a few other stations.

In March 2001, the Greek government closed approximately 60 of 90+ FM stations operating in the Athens area, citing potential interference to frequencies to be used by the new Athens International Airport. There are some who believe that the government shut down these stations as a political favor to powerful publishing and media groups, whose stations, for the most part, remained on the air; others argued that the licensing process was legally inconsistent.

The Greek broadcast licensing process came under legal scrutiny as a result, and in 2002, eight of the closed stations reopened. In 2004 and 2005, several more stations reopened as the result of a judicial order. Stations have continued to open since then. Most of them are unlicensed and lack legal permission to broadcast; many of these stations were among those shut down by the Greek government in 2001. Throughout the country, no radio station is operating with a formal license as of March 2019; instead, stations are operating with temporary permits of legality with no expiration date, or simply operate without any legal status whatsoever.

The following is a list of major FM stations in Greece; this list is being upgraded.

== Radio stations in Attica ==
Most stations in Athens broadcast from Mount Ymittos to the east of the city (but west of the Athens International Airport in Spata). A smaller minority of stations operate from Mount Parnitha, northwest of the city, or Mount Aigaleo, bordering the west of the city. Many stations also have repeaters on the island of Aegina, south of Athens in the Saronic Sea, to cover coastal regions of Athens, including Glyfada and Vouliagmeni, which due to the topography of the region, cannot receive clear signals from the other locations.

Most stations broadcast in stereo and several employ the Radio Data System technology. Most stations also broadcast with wattage ranging from 2 kW to 15–30 kW; official data on this is not made publicly available. Currently, 44 private radio stations are legally permitted to broadcast in Athens, in addition to the state radio broadcast stations. Focus Bari was chosen as the official company to measure audience listening data and ratings for stations in the Athens region. Previous to that, Focus Bari had been one of several companies tracking audience ratings.

Frequency	Name	On air since	Description
87.1 MHz	261 Radio	2013	Amateur radio station with foreign soul music (formerly broadcast on 87.2)
87.5 MHz	Kriti FM 87,5	1 January 2000	Music of Crete (ex. Radio Megalonisos 107, Kriti FM 103.4)
87.7 MHz	En Lefko 87,7	1998	Alternative rock (formerly broadcast on 94.4 – ex. Rodon FM, OCH!, Radio 5)
88.0 MHz	Menta 88 FM	2 December 2013	Greek éntekhno music (ex. Oasis FM, Virgin, Ixos FM, Difono 89.7, Galaxias FM, Super FM)
88.3 MHz	Athletiko FM	2026	Sports and talk (ex. Lyra Kriti – formerly on 91.4) (previously on this frequency VFM, ex. Village, Klik – formerly on 88)
88.6 MHz	Kidsradio.com	31 October 2020	Children's music (ex. Legend, News 247 Radio, Panda, UP, Follow, NRJ, Fresh, John Greek, Polis, Ellada)
88.9 MHz	HiT Radio 88,9	2014	Foreign pop and rock music (ex. Freedom Radio, Play FM, Freedom Radio, Angel FM, Jeronimo Groovy)
89.2 MHz	Music Radio 89,2	7 June 2010	Foreign music (ex. Arrena, Kefi, Sportime, Champions, Metropolis, Alpha Sports – formerly on 107.4)
89.5 MHz	Ecclesia tis Ellados	19 February 1989	National; Orthodox religious radio station by the Church of Greece (formerly broadcast on 89.4)
89.8 MHz	Dromos Radio 89,8	2008	Greek and foreign music (ex. Soho, Ciao FM 104.2, Radio Mania, Studio 2, Radio Megara)
90.1 MHz	Parapolitika Radio	28 April 2014	News and talk (ex. E Radio, 902 Left on FM – formerly broadcast on 90.2)
90.4 MHz	Kanali 1 Piraeus	9 February 1987	Piraeus municipal radio station with news and talk (formerly broadcast on 90.6)
90.6 MHz	Laikos 90.6	2025	Greek music for a few minutes every morning with low signal (formerly broadcast on 107.4, 106, 106.8, 91.4, 91.8)
90.65 MHz	Rock Fever	2022	Amateur radio station with foreign rock music (formerly broadcast on 107.5, 104.9, 101.1, 100.05)
90.7 MHz	Meraki	2014	Greek laïko music (ex. Aktina FM, Next Radio – formerly broadcast on 107.6, 88.3 & 91.4)
90.9 MHz	Third Programme	19 September 1954	National; classical music; third station of Greek state radio (formerly broadcast also on 107.7)
91.2 MHz	Peiraiki Ecclesia	1988	Orthodox religious radio station by the Church of Piraeus
91.4 MHz	Dirla FM 91.4	2013	Greek music (formerly broadcast on 94.3, 93.8, 95.8, 96, 99.5, 96.1, 100, 104.8, 107.8)
91.6 MHz	ERT News Radio	15 September 2025	National; news and talk; first station of Greek state radio
91.8 MHz	Old Radio Athens	2011	Amateur radio station with foreign pop music (formerly broadcast on 98.1)
91.8 MHz	Crazy Radio 91.8	2012	Amateur radio station with Greek and foreign pop music (formerly on 101.6, 93.8, 93.4, 96, 95.8, 106.8, 88.3)
91.8 MHz	Studio 513 FM	2011	Amateur radio station with Greek and foreign pop music (formerly broadcast on 96, 103.5)
92.0 MHz	Galaxy 92	1989	Alternative rock and easy listening (formerly broadcast on 92.1, 91.9, 91.8)
92.3 MHz	Lampsi	1 January 1996	Greek pop and rock music (formerly broadcast on 92.4 – ex. POP FM, TOP FM)
92.6 MHz	Best	1 October 2001 - 5 March 2013, 21 June 2015 - today	Foreign alternative rock (formerly broadcast on 92.7 – ex. Status, Music Channel)
92.9 MHz	Kiss FM	1 May 1993	Foreign pop and rock music (formerly broadcast on 90.9 – ex. Nobel Radio)
93.2 MHz	Ellinikos FM	2015	Greek éntekhno music (ex. Orange FM, Happy, Orange FM, Athens Business Radio – formerly on 99.2)
93.4 MHz	Palmos 93,4	2004	Greek music (formerly broadcast on 91.8, 102.7, 105.4 – ex. Radio Troizinia)
93.6 MHz	Kosmos 93.6	29 October 2001	Foreign world music; sixth station of Greek state radio (split by the Second Programme)
93.8 MHz	613 FM	2023	Amateur radio station with foreign and greek pop and rock music (formerly broadcast on 95.4, 100.1)
94.0 MHz	Epikoinonia FM	24 March 1989	News, talk and Greek music; Neo Irakleio municipal radio station (formerly broadcast on 94.1 FM)
94.3 MHz	Interwetten Sports	2025	News, sports and talk; Self-managed radio (ex. Ellada, Polis, News FM, Dream, Xenios FM – formerly on 97.4)
94.6 MHz	Bwin Sport FM	2020	National; sports and talk (ex. Sport FM, NovaSport, SuperSport, Sport FM, Athens FM – formerly also on 95.3)
94.9 MHz	Rythmos FM 9,49	2000	Greek pop and rock music (formerly broadcast on 101.1 – ex. Link FM, Athenian Radio)
95.2 MHz	Athens DeeJay	1 September 2000	Foreign pop and rock music (formerly broadcast on 99.7 – ex. Kanali 107)
95.6 MHz	Third Programme	19 September 1954	National; classical music; third station of Greek state radio (formerly broadcast also on 107.7)
96.0 MHz	Notes Radio 96	27 November 2024	Greek music (ex. Style, Over FM, Style – formerly broadcast on 104.9, 104.8, 105, 105.5 – ex. Radio Greece 97.9)
96.3 MHz	Red FM 96.3	2004	Foreign rock and heavy metal music (ex. Klik on Capital, Capital Gold, Capital FM – formerly on 96.5 – ex. Alfa)
96.6 MHz	Pepper 96,6	2011	Foreign jazz and soul music (ex. Difono, HiJack, Captain Jack, Profit – formerly on 98.1 – ex. Skyrock)
96.9 MHz	969 ROCK	1989	Foreign rock and heavy metal music (formerly broadcast on 96.8 FM)
97.2 MHz	Easy 972	29 October 2012	Foreign music (ex. ΑΝΤ1 Radio – formerly broadcast on 97.1, 102.9)
97.5 MHz	Love 975	3 July 1996	Greek and foreign music (formerly broadcast on 99)
97.8 MHz	Real 97.8	3 September 2007	News and talk (ex. Radio Veronica – formerly broadcast on 97.7)
98.1 MHz	Free FM 98.1	1997	Foreign music (ex. Liquid Radio – formerly broadcast on 103.4)
98.3 MHz	Athens 98.4 FM	31 May 1987	News and talk; Athens municipal radio station
98.6 MHz	Nitro Radio	3 July 2026	Foreign music (ex. Pride, Mousikos FM, Derti, Super Star, Eva – formerly on 106.6, 106.5 – ex. Radio Pliroforiki)
98.9 MHz	Alpha Radio 98.9	2003	News and talk (ex. Talk Radio, Alpha, Nine, Thema, Alpha, Alpha News – formerly on 98.7 – ex. Cool FM, Seven-X)
99.2 MHz	Melodia FM	1991	Greek éntekhno music (formerly broadcast on 100, 103.3 – ex. New Channel)
99.5 MHz	Peiratikos Radio	16 December 2017	Greek laïko music (ex. Vima FM, City FM, Planet – formerly broadcast on 104.5 – ex. Kanali 15)
99.8 MHz	Machi 99.8	9 December 2024	Greek Solution political party supporter news and talk radio station; rebroadcasting with Focus FM 103.6
100.0 MHz	Cool FM	2018	Amateur radio station with Greek and foreign pop music (formerly broadcast on 107.2, 106, 101.1)
100.3 MHz	Skai 100.3	1988	News and talk; DW, BBC and VOA relays (formerly broadcast on 100.6, 100.4, 100.7)
100.6 MHz	Nostos	2016	Alternative rock (ex. Herodotus FM 107.4)
100.9 MHz	ERA Sport	3 May 1993	National; sports and talk; fourth station of Greek state radio
101.1 MHz	Deep Techno Melodic	2022	Amateur radio station with foreign electronic music (formerly on 96, 96.1 & 95.9)
101.1 MHz	Sound FM	2023	Amateur radio station with Greek & foreign pop music (formerly on 95.8 & 95.4)
101.3 MHz	Diesi FM	2004	Greek éntekhno music (ex. Stathmos FM, Power FM)
101.6 MHz	Paradise FM	1993	Greek and foreign music; rebroadcasting with We 89.4 fm (formerly on 104.6, 106.8, 106.9)
101.8 MHz	ERA Sport	3 May 1993	National; sports and talk; fourth station of Greek state radio
102.0 MHz	Skai Argolidas	1989	News and talk; rebroadcasting with Skai 100.3 (ex. Alpha Argolidas, Isimeria – formerly on 102.3)
102.0 MHz	New Star FM 102	2011	Amateur radio station with foreign pop music
102.2 MHz	Sfera	1996	National; Greek music (formerly on 102.1 – ex. Space FM, Studio 10)
102.3 MHz	Planet Lakonias	2013	Greek laïko and rebetiko music (ex. Radio Vatika)
102.5 MHz	102.5	2002	Foreign electronic music (ex. Athens Voice, Nitro 102.4, Jazz FM, Echo FM 104 – merge with Fox 93.2)
102.7 MHz	Viral FM 102.7	9 March 2025	LAOS radio with Greek music, talk and news (formerly on 90.6, 90.65 – ex. ART FM, Radioasty, Radio City 102.7)
102.9 MHz	Second Programme	11 May 1952	National; Greek music; second station of Greek state radio
103.1 MHz	Omega FM	2011	Greek music from Thriasio Pedio (formerly on 103.5, 93.4, 100 – ex. Radiofonia Thriassiou Pediou, Aisxylos)
103.3 MHz	Shock FM 103.3	16 October 2026	Greek pop music; rebroadcasting with Shock FM 104.8 (split by Blackman – merge with Sport24, ex. Sentra FM, Radio Gold – formerly broadcast on 105 - ex. Studio 1 104.8, Athens Shock Radio 104.6)
103.7 MHz	Second Programme	11 May 1952	National; Greek music; second station of Greek state radio
104.0 MHz	Happy Radio 104	2022	Foreign pop and rock music (ex. Party FM, Parea FM, Balkan 2000 News, Fly FM)
104.3 MHz	Christianity FM	1993	Religious radio by the Free Apostolic Church of Pentecost (formerly on 93.9 – ex. Space FM)
104.6 MHz	Mega News	24 August 2026	News and talk (ex. My Radio, Thema, Action, HOT FM, Shock FM 104.8 – formerly on 104.75 – ex. Studio 1 104.8 & Athens Shock Radio 104.6)
104.9 MHz	Kalitexnoupolis	2024	Greek music (ex. Galaxias, Erwtikos, Vips, Top FM, Eleytheros, Super, Bluestar – formerly on 95.9, 96, 103.1, 93.8, 107.6, 107.5, 107.8, 107.7)
105.2 MHz	Rebel FM Athens	2021	Foreign rock music (ex. Atlantis FM 105.2, Maxitis 88.4, Atlantis 90 – formerly also on 89.95)
105.5 MHz	Sto Kokkino 105,5	6 February 2006	Greek and foreign music; Syriza political party news and talk station (ex. Left FM)
105.8 MHz	ERT News Radio	15 September 2025	National; news and talk; first station of Greek state radio
106.0 MHz	IMAIK Radio	2023	Orthodox religious radio by Iera Moni Agiou Prodromou Karea, opening for a few hours every morning and afternoon
106.0 MHz	Radio Alfa 106	2025	Low power station from Megara with Greek music (formerly on 107.4, 107.6, 107.7)
106.2 MHz	Mad Radio 106,2	22 November 2006	Foreign pop and rock music (ex. Ecstasy, Notos, Diva – formerly on 106.1 – ex. Glyfada FM, Fantasy FM)
106.4 MHz	Opa FM 106,4	2026	Greek laïko music (ex. Radio Argosaronikos – formerly on 94.9 – ex. Radio Saronikos)
106.5 MHz	Digital FM	2001	Greek laïko music (ex. Minore 104.3, Orfeas FM, Digital 106.7, Omikron FM)
106.7 MHz	Zeppelin	27 August 2021	Foreign rock and heavy metal music; seventh station of Greek state radio (ex. ERT Open, Filia)
107.0 MHz	Kosmos 93.6	29 October 2001	Foreign world music; sixth station of Greek state radio (split by the Second Programme)
107.3 MHz	Blue Space Radio	2005	Foreign pop and rock music (formerly on 107.2 – ex. Disco Radio, Blue Sky)
107.5 MHz	Radio Glykouli	2026	Shadow theatre with Karagiozis characters & foreign rock and pop music (formerly on 104.9)
107.8 MHz	107.8 Radio	2026	Greek music (ex. Dirla, Star FM Athens)
108.0 MHz	Hxorama FM	2005	Greek pop music (ex. Club FM, Hxorama, Dias, Fresh, Fuego, Diva, Radio 108 FM, Superstar FM)

== Radio stations in Thessaloniki ==
In the Thessaloniki region a licensing bid for 27 FM frequencies has been on hold for several years, while engineering studies have shown that up to 19 more radio stations could possibly broadcast safely in the region, though how many if any, additional frequencies will be tendered remains uncertain.

Most radio stations in Thessaloniki broadcast from Mount Chortiatis, slightly northeast of the city. A very small minority broadcast from or have repeaters in other points throughout the region. Most stations broadcast in stereo, but a small (but slowly growing) number uses the Radio Data System. Like in Athens, most stations use excessively high wattage. Temporarily, most, but not all, stations are broadcasting with legal "permission" from Greek National Council for Radio and Television, until and if new licenses are issued.

Frequency	Name	On air since	Description
87.6 MHz	Laikos FM 87.6	31 December 2000	Greek music (ex. Eroticos Forever, Kiss FM)
88.0 MHz	ERT News Radio	15 September 2025	National; news and talk; first station of Greek state radio
88.3 MHz	Radio Agapi 88,3	1976	Greek laïko and rebetiko music (daily broadcast 10:00 to 14:00)
88.5 MHz	Makedonia 88Miso	1993	Foreign soul, jazz, pop and rock music; located from Thessaloniki
88.7 MHz	Sohos FM 88.7	1994	Greek éntekhno, laïko and rebetiko music; located from Sochos
89.0 MHz	89 Rainbow	6 September 2005	Foreign music (ex. DeeJay, TOP FM 89, Kanali 2 Makedonia)
89.4 MHz	We Radio 89.4	2020	Foreign music (ex. Arena, DeeJay, Lampsi, Gramophone)
89.7 MHz	Imagine FM 89,7	28 October 2007	Foreign soul, funk, pop and rock music (ex. Studio 5)
90.0 MHz	Second Programme	11 May 1952	National; Greek music; second station of Greek state radio
90.4 MHz	904 Left on FM	1989	News and talk; Local radio station of the Communist Party of Greece
90.8 MHz	ZOO Radio 90.8	2003	Foreign pop and rock music (ex. Kiss FM Thessaloniki, Mousikes Epiloges)
91.1 MHz	VFM 91.1	2013	Foreign pop and rock music (ex. Venus FM, Radio Odysseia – Stathmos)
91.4 MHz	91.4 sto Kokkino	2019	News and talk; rebroadcasting with 105,5 sto Kokkino from Athens
91.7 MHz	RSO 91,7	1995	Foreign pop and rock music; located from Pylaia
92.0 MHz	Third Programme	19 September 1954	National; classical music; third station of Greek state radio
92.3 MHz	Karamela FM 92.3	2015	Greek music (formerly broadcast on 92.4 – ex. Ekfrasi, Radio Kivotos)
92.5 MHz	Blue Radio 92.5	2015	Greek éntekhno music (ex. Music Radio, Melody FM, Radio Agios)
93.4 MHz	Mythos FM	2000	Greek éntekhno music (ex. Sto Kokkino, Procka, Mythos FM)
93.7 MHz	Gnomi FM	1993	News, talk and Greek pop music; located from Thessaloniki
93.9 MHz	ERA Sport	3 May 1993	National; sports and talk; fourth station of Greek state radio
94.2 MHz	Lydia Philippisia	1993	Orthodox religious radio station (formerly broadcast on 94)
94.5 MHz	Radio Thessaloniki	1986	News and talk; rebroadcasting with Real FM 97,8 Athens
94.8 MHz	Eroticos FM 9.48	1994	Greek éntekhno music (ex. Thessaloniki Radio Days)
95.1 MHz	Cosmoradio 95.1	1987	Greek pop music; located from Thessaloniki
95.5 MHz	Athletic Metropolis	1989	Sports, news and talk; located from Pylaia
95.8 MHz	Macedonia 95.8 FM	1994	Culture; second station of Greek state radio from Thessaloniki
96.1 MHz	Minore Radio 96.1	2022	Greek music (ex. Fresh Radio, Fresh Salad, Fair Play, Next, Mylos Radio, S'Agapo)
96.5 MHz	Palmos FM 96.5	2005	Greek and foreign music (ex. Alpha Radio, Alpha Polis, Alpha News, Radio Kronos)
96.8 MHz	Velvet Radio	2009	Foreign pop and rock music (ex. Dallas, Melodikos FM, Radio Chalastra)
97.5 MHz	Radio Paidaki	2023	Children's music (ex. Easy FM, Antenna Radio Thessaloniki)
98.0 MHz	Melodia 98 FM	2023	Greek music; rebroadcasting with Melodia 99.2 Athens
98.4 MHz	Panorama 9.84	1986	Greek pop and rock music; located from Thessaloniki
98.6 MHz	Radio Live FM	1990	Greek and foreign pop music; located from Asprovalta
98.7 MHz	Classic 9.87	2015	Foreign pop music from 80's and 90's (ex. Athlitika Nea)
99.0 MHz	Radio 1	1989	Greek laïko, pop and rock music; located from Thessaloniki
99.4 MHz	Flash 99.4	1989	News and talk with Greek pop music; located from Thessaloniki
99.8 MHz	Radio Ekrixi	1994	Sports and talk with Greek laïko and rebetiko; located from Evosmos
100.0 MHz	FM 100	3 September 1987	First station of the municipal radio network; rebroadcasts Athens 98.4 FM
100.3 MHz	Transistor FM	2019	Greek pop and rock music (ex. Republic 100.3 and Planet Radio Thessaloniki)
100.6 MHz	FM 100.6	1990	Entertainment and culture; second station of Thessaloniki municipal radio network
101.3 MHz	Lelevose Pontos	2012	Pontic Greeks traditional music; relays of the namesake radio station of Kavala
101.7 MHz	Yellow Radio 101.7	14 September 2020	Sports, news and talk (ex. Kalamaria FM, Sindos Radio and Fresh Radio)
102.0 MHz	Macedonia 102 FM	1988	News and talk; first station of Greek state radio from Thessaloniki
102.3 MHz	Akrites tou Pontou	1993	Pontic Greeks traditional music; located from Stavroupoli
102.6 MHz	Plus Radio 102.6	2004	Foreign pop music (ex. Melody Maker and Kalamaria Children)
103.6 MHz	Focus FM 103.6	2014	News and talk (ex. Studio 3 – formerly broadcast on 103.5, 103.4)
104.0 MHz	FLY 104 Salonica	1 February 2016	Foreign dance music (ex. Rythmos, Banana, Kanali 104 & TOP FM)
104.4 MHz	Shook Radio 104.4	2021	Foreign pop and rock music from 80's and 90's (ex. Radiokymata 104.4)
104.7 MHz	Rock Radio 104.7	1999	Foreign rock music (ex. Music Information, Jeronimo Groovy, Radio Koufalia)
104.9 MHz	Praktoreio FM	2015	Athens-Macedonian News Agency and Thessaloniki International Fair radio station
105.5 MHz	1055 Rock	2001	Foreign rock and heavy metal music (ex. Fresh Kiss & 105,3 Kiss FM Thessaloniki)
105.8 MHz	Chroma FM	2013	Greek éntekhno and foreign music from eighties (ex. Mousikos Galaxias 105,8 fm)
106.1 MHz	City Radio 106.1	1989	News and talk (ex. City of Primo and City International)
106.8 MHz	Orthodox Presence	1988	Religious station; rebroadcasting with Ecclesia FM 89,5 of Athens
107.1 MHz	Thita Radio 107.1	2026	News, talk and foreign music (ex. Music Radio, Ellinikos, Real FM, Safari)
107.4 MHz	Athlitikos Libero	2004	Sports, talk and entertainment (ex. Club FM 107.4 Thessaloniki)
107.7 MHz	Status FM 107.7	2019	News and talk; rebroadcasting with Skai 100.3

== Radio stations in the Aegean islands ==
=== Prefecture of Chios ===
Frequency	Name	On air since	Description
89.4 MHz	Be Radio	2024	Greek music; rebroadcasting with Ellinikos 93,2 Athens
90.7 MHz	Radio 1 90,7	1987	News and talk; rebroadcasting with Meganews Radio 104,6 from Athens
91.9 MHz	Chroma Radio	2016	Greek and foreign music; rebroadcasting with Chroma FM 105,8
92.5 MHz	Chroma Radio	2016	Greek and foreign music; rebroadcasting with Chroma FM 105,8
93.1 MHz	Simantro FM	1 August 1993	Religious radio; rebroadcasting with Ecclesia FM 89,5 Athens
94.1 MHz	Palmos FM Chios	1997	Greek and foreign pop and rock music; located from Chios
95.2 MHz	Second Programme	11 May 1952	National; Greek music; second station of Greek state radio
95.5 MHz	Radio Alithia Chios	13 May 1988	News and talk; rebroadcasting with Skai 100.3 from Athens
95.7 MHz	Radio Alithia Chios	13 May 1988	News and talk; rebroadcasting with Skai 100.3 from Athens
96.3 MHz	Pirate FM 96.3	1990	Alternative rock and electronic music; located from Chios
98.9 MHz	Sfera FM 98.9	2008	Greek pop music; rebroadcasting with Sfera Athens
99.3 MHz	Radio Patrida	1993	News and talk; rebroadcasting with Real FM 97.8
100.1 MHz	ERT Aegean	1989	News and talk; Local station of Greek state radio
101.4 MHz	Amani FM	1993	Amateur radio with Greek music; located from Amani
101.8 MHz	Be Radio	2024	Greek music; rebroadcasting with Ellinikos 93,2 Athens
102.1 MHz	ERA Sport	3 May 1993	National; sports and talk; fourth station of Greek state radio
102.4 MHz	Chiakos FM	2021	News and Greek music (ex. Groovy Station, formerly on 102.2)
102.7 MHz	Chiakos FM	2021	News and Greek music (ex. Groovy Station, formerly on 102.2)
104.9 MHz	ANT1 Aegean	2006	News and talk; rebroadcasting with Easy FM 97.2 of Athens
105.4 MHz	ANT1 Aegean	2006	News and talk; rebroadcasting with Easy FM 97.2 of Athens
107.5 MHz	Radio Mastixa	2007	Greek music; rebroadcasting with Kidsradio.com 88.6
107.7 MHz	Radio Mastixa	2007	Greek music; rebroadcasting with Kidsradio.com 88.6

=== Prefecture of Cyclades ===
Frequency	Name	On air since	Description
89.9 MHz	Ecclesia FM	19 February 1989	Radio station by the Church of Greece
90.3 MHz	Radio Active	16 July 1999	Foreign electronica; located from Sifnos
91.3 MHz	Radio Active	16 July 1999	Foreign electronica; located from Sifnos
91.8 MHz	Radio Prisma	1995	Greek laïko and pop music (ex. Kanali 13)
92.0 MHz	Asteras Radio	2014	Greek pop and rock music (ex. Media Syros)
92.3 MHz	Paronaxia 92.3	1996	Religious; rebroadcasting with Peiraiki Ecclesia
93.0 MHz	Galaxias Radio	1993	Greek éntekhno and laïko; located from Mykonos
93.9 MHz	Elpida FM 93.9	1996	Religious; rebroadcasting with Christianity 104.3
94.5 MHz	Aposperitis FM	2016	Greek laïko; rebroadcasting with Sport FM 94,6
95.8 MHz	Aegean Live	1988	News and talk; rebroadcasting with NG Athens
97.6 MHz	Kyklades Radio	15 January 1989	News/talk and Greek music; located from Naxos
98.1 MHz	Mykonos FM	1990	News/talk and Greek music; located from Mykonos
98.5 MHz	Paros FM Stereo	1993	Greek traditional and laïko music; located from Parikia
98.9 MHz	Second Programme	11 May 1952	National; Greek music; second station of Greek state radio
99.3 MHz	Venus Radio 99,3	1989	Foreign electronica and pop music; located from Mykonos
99.8 MHz	Nissos FM 99.8	2022	Amateur station with Greek music; located from Sifnos
100.3 MHz	Prime FM 100,3	2007	Foreign pop and rock music (ex. Syros FM Stereo)
101.0 MHz	Cyclades FM1	1997	News; rebroadcasting with 105,5 Sto Kokkino
101.3 MHz	Free FM 101.3	1989	News and talk; rebroadcasting with NG Athens
102.1 MHz	Echo – Paros	1989	News and talk with Greek music; located from Parikia
102.7 MHz	ERA Sport	3 May 1993	National; sports and talk; fourth station of Greek state radio
104.0 MHz	Faros Radio	1988	Greek éntekhno, laïko and pop music; located from Ermoupoli
104.5 MHz	Atlantis 104,5	1998	Religious station; rebroadcasting with Peiraiki Ecclesia 91.2
104.9 MHz	Top Melody FM	1999	News and talk with foreign music; located from Santorini
105.4 MHz	Mesogeios 105.4	1995	News and talk; rebroadcasting with Parapolitika FM Athens
105.9 MHz	Radio Faros 105,9	1979	News and talk; rebroadcasting with Skai 100.3 Athens
106.4 MHz	Santorini FM 106.4	1992	News and talk with Greek pop music; located from Santorini
107.0 MHz	Empneusi 107 FM	2014	Greek music; rebroadcasting with Melodia 99.2 Athens
107.5 MHz	Aegean Voice	2016	News and talk; rebroadcasting with Real FM 97,8 of Athens
108.0 MHz	Milos 108	2008	Greek music; Amateur radio station from Milos

=== Prefecture of Dodecanese ===
Frequency	Name	On air since	Description
87.6 MHz	88fm Radio1	4 December 1989	World music and top 40; rebroadcasting with 102.5fm Radio
88.0 MHz	88fm Radio1	4 December 1989	World music and top 40; rebroadcasting with 102.5fm Radio
88.4 MHz	ERT News Radio	15 September 2025	National; news and talk; first station of Greek state radio
89.8 MHz	Rodos FM 90.7	2006	Greek music (formerly on 97.7 – ex. Eroticos and Style FM)
90.1 MHz	Best FM Rodos	1996	Greek pop and rock music; located from Kremasti
90.4 MHz	Second Programme	11 May 1952	National; Greek music; second station of Greek state radio
90.7 MHz	Rodos FM 90.7	2006	Greek music (formerly on 97.7 – ex. Eroticos and Style FM)
91.4 MHz	Radio Lihnari 91.7	1994	Greek éntekhno and laïko music; located from Rhodes
91.5 MHz	Radio Proto 915fm	1 December 1996	News and talk; rebroadcasting with Sfera FM Athens
91.7 MHz	Radio Lihnari 91.7	1994	Greek éntekhno and laïko music; located from Rhodes
92.2 MHz	Archangelos FM	21 December 1989	Greek pop music; rebroadcasting with Sfera FM Athens
92.7 MHz	ERT Rhodes	1954	News and culture; Local station of Greek state radio
93.0 MHz	Klik FM 93	2025	News and talk (ex. Radio City and Kanali 3 Kos)
93.1 MHz	ERT Rhodes	1954	News and culture; Local station of Greek state radio
93.4 MHz	Archangelos FM	21 December 1989	Greek pop music; rebroadcasting with Sfera FM Athens
93.8 MHz	Kosmos FM 93.8	2012	News and talk; rebroadcasting with Parapolitika FM 90.1
94.1 MHz	Archangelos FM	21 December 1989	Greek pop music; rebroadcasting with Sfera FM Athens
94.5 MHz	Rythmos FM12	2005	Greek music; rebroadcasting with Rythmos 9,49 of Athens
94.8 MHz	Archangelos FM	21 December 1989	Greek pop music; rebroadcasting with Sfera FM Athens
94.9 MHz	Kalymnos 949fm	1997	News, talk and music; rebroadcasting with Athens 98.4 FM
94.9 MHz	Ecclesia FM 89,5	19 February 1989	Orthodox religious radio station by the Church of Greece
95.9 MHz	Melodia FM Rodos	2026	Greek music; rebroadcasting with Melodia 99,2 from Athens
96.1 MHz	Second Programme	11 May 1952	National; Greek music; second station of Greek state radio
96.2 MHz	Notos News 97,8fm	27 September 2016	News and talk; rebroadcasting with Focus from Thessaloniki
96.3 MHz	Alithia Kalymnos	14 April 1991	Religious radio; rebroadcasting with Peiraiki Ecclesia 91.2fm
96.8 MHz	Prime Radio	2026	News and talk; rebroadcasting with Mega News 104.6 from Athens
97.0 MHz	Ekfrasi	1991	News and talk; rebroadcasting with Parapolitika FM 90.1
97.4 MHz	TOP FM	1995	Sports and talk; rebroadcasting with Bwin Sport 94,6
97.5 MHz	Alithia Kalymnos	14 April 1991	Religious radio; rebroadcasting with Peiraiki Ecclesia 91.2fm
97.8 MHz	Notos News 97,8fm	27 September 2016	News and talk; rebroadcasting with Focus from Thessaloniki
98.0 MHz	Radio Kos 98 FM	1989	News, talk with Greek music; Kos municipal radio station
98.4 MHz	ERT Rhodes	1954	News and culture; Local station of Greek state radio
98.6 MHz	Galaxy 99	2010	Foreign music (ex. Hot Radio and Alpha Gold 106.8)
99.0 MHz	Galaxy 99	2010	Foreign music (ex. Hot Radio and Alpha Gold 106.8)
99.5 MHz	Real Voice	2022	News and talk; rebroadcasting with Real 97,8 of Athens
100.2 MHz	Olympus Radio	1988	News and Greek music; rebroadcasting with Alpha from Athens
100.3 MHz	Third Programme	19 September 1954	National; classical music; third station of Greek state radio
100.5 MHz	Metropolis 100,5	2020	Sports; rebroadcasting with Metropolis 95.5 Thessaloniki
100.8 MHz	Sky FM Rodos	2002	News and talk; rebroadcasting with Skai 100.3 from Athens
101.1 MHz	Palmos FM	2018	Greek pop and rock (ex. Best Radio Kos & Muzik FM 100.3)
101.3 MHz	Karpathos Radio	1989	Karpathos municipal talk radio with Greek and foreign music
101.4 MHz	ERA Sport	3 May 1993	National; sports and talk; fourth station of Greek state radio
101.7 MHz	Archangelos FM	21 December 1989	Greek pop music; rebroadcasting with Sfera FM Athens
102.4 MHz	TOP FM	1995	Sports and talk; rebroadcasting with Bwin Sport 94,6
102.5 MHz	Radio Leros	1988	Leros municipal news and culture radio station
102.7 MHz	Lemon Radio	2021	Greek and foreign music (ex. Klik FM, Ti Amo & Extra)
103.1 MHz	Best FM Rodos	1996	Greek pop and rock music; located from Kremasti
103.4 MHz	Third Programme	19 September 1954	National; classical music; third station of Greek state radio
103.7 MHz	Prime Radio	2026	News and talk; rebroadcasting with Mega News 104.6 from Athens
104.0 MHz	Tharri FM	1990	Religious station; rebroadcasting with Peiraiki Ecclesia 91.2
104.3 MHz	Kastellorizo FM	1996	News and talk; rebroadcasting with NG Web Radio Athens
104.9 MHz	Box Radio 104,9	2024	Foreign music; rebroadcasting with Hit FM 88,9 of Athens
105.6 MHz	Real Voice	2022	News and talk; rebroadcasting with Real 97,8 of Athens
106.2 MHz	Lemon Radio	2021	Greek and foreign music (ex. Klik FM, Ti Amo & Extra)
106.5 MHz	Tharri FM	1990	Religious station; rebroadcasting with Peiraiki Ecclesia 91.2
106.9 MHz	Melodia Kos	1996	Greek music; rebroadcasting with Love Radio 97,5 of Athens
107.9 MHz	ERA Sport	3 May 1993	National; sports and talk; fourth station of Greek state radio

=== Prefecture of Lesbos ===
Frequency	Name	On air since	Description
87.5 MHz	Radio Kalloni	1996	News, talk and Greek music; rebroadcasting with Sfera 102.2
88.2 MHz	Love Mitilini	2003	Easy listening; rebroadcasting with Love Radio 97.5 Athens
90.0 MHz	Radio Mitilini	1989	Greek pop and rock music (formerly broadcast on 107.6)
91.6 MHz	Rythmos Radio	2005	Greek pop music; rebroadcasting with Rythmos 9,49
92.3 MHz	ERT News Radio	15 September 2025	National; news and talk; first station of Greek state radio
92.8 MHz	Aeolos FM 92,8	1989	Greek laïko-rebetiko-éntekhno music; located from Mytilene
93.2 MHz	Astra FM 93,2	2000	Greek pop and rock music (ex. Central Radio Lesvos – Kalloni)
93.3 MHz	Foni tis Ecclesias	2000	Orthodox religious radio; rebroadcasting with Ecclesia Athens
94.3 MHz	Second Programme	11 May 1952	National; Greek music; second station of Greek state radio
95.7 MHz	Holiday FM Stereo	2013	Greek pop and rock music (ex. Hybrid, DeeJay, Hot FM)
96.0 MHz	Radio Alfa 96fm	1991	News and talk; rebroadcasting with Sfera FM Athens
96.5 MHz	ERT Aegean	1989	News and talk; Local station of Greek state radio
96.7 MHz	Melody Radio	2006	News; rebroadcasting with 105.5 sto Kokkino
96.8 MHz	Minore FM 96,8	1985	Greek pop, dance and rock music; located from Kalloni
97.2 MHz	Third Programme	19 September 1954	National; classical music; third station of Greek state radio
97.6 MHz	Local Radio Mitilini	1990	News, talk and music; rebroadcasting with Athens 98.4 FM
97.9 MHz	Lemnos Radio 979	1989	News, talk, culture and Greek music; located from Myrina
98.1 MHz	Best FM Lesvos	1992	Greek and foreign music; rebroadcasting with Real FM
98.6 MHz	Best FM Lesvos	1992	Greek and foreign music; rebroadcasting with Real FM
99.0 MHz	Sto Nisi 99 fm	2019	News and talk; rebroadcasting with Mega News 104.6 from Athens
99.4 MHz	ERT Aegean	1989	News and talk; Local station of Greek state radio
99.8 MHz	SKAI Aegean	2009	News and talk; rebroadcasting with Skai 100.3
100.0 MHz	Lemnos FM100	1989	News; rebroadcasting with Radio Thessaloniki 94,5
100.8 MHz	Peiraiki Ecclesia	1988	Orthodox religious radio station by the Church of Piraeus
101.5 MHz	Slam 101.5 FM	2019	Foreign music; rebroadcasting with 95.2 Athens DeeJay
102.7 MHz	Sto Nisi 99 fm	2019	News and talk; rebroadcasting with Mega News 104.6 from Athens
103.0 MHz	ERT Aegean	1989	News and talk; Local station of Greek state radio
103.8 MHz	Ecclesia 89.5	19 February 1989	National; Orthodox radio station by the Church of Greece
104.4 MHz	ERT Aegean	1989	News and talk; Local station of Greek state radio
105.8 MHz	Peiraiki Ecclesia	1988	Orthodox religious radio station by the Church of Piraeus
105.9 MHz	ERT Aegean	1989	News and talk; Local station of Greek state radio
105.9 MHz	Second Programme	11 May 1952	National; Greek music; second station of Greek state radio
106.4 MHz	Third Programme	19 September 1954	National; classical music; third station of Greek state radio
106.9 MHz	SKAI Aegean	2009	News and talk; rebroadcasting with Skai 100.3
107.4 MHz	Peiraiki Ecclesia	1988	Orthodox religious radio station by the Church of Piraeus
107.4 MHz	Radio Kalloni	1996	News, talk and Greek music; rebroadcasting with Sfera 102.2
107.7 MHz	Radio Kalloni	1996	News, talk and Greek music; rebroadcasting with Sfera 102.2
107.9 MHz	ERA Sport	3 May 1993	National; sports/talk; fourth station of Greek state radio

=== Prefecture of Samos ===
Frequency	Name	On air since	Description
87.6 MHz	Radio Ikaria 87,6	1996	News and talk with Greek music; located from Agios Kirykos
87.7 MHz	Second Programme	11 May 1952	National; Greek music; second station of Greek state radio
88.8 MHz	Flight Radio Ikaria	2025	Foreign rock music; rebroadcasting with Zeppelin 106.7
89.1 MHz	ERT Aegean	1989	News and talk; Local station of Greek state radio
89.4 MHz	Ionia Plus	2014	News and talk with Greek and foreign music
89.7 MHz	ERT Aegean	1989	News and talk; Local station of Greek state radio
91.7 MHz	ERT Aegean	1989	News and talk; Local station of Greek state radio
92.2 MHz	Akritiki Foni 9,22	1999	Religious; rebroadcasting with Peiraiki Ecclesia FM
92.8 MHz	Ikarian Radio 92.8	1991	News, culture and Greek music; located from Evdilos
94.2 MHz	Space (Xoros) FM	1996	Student radio station of the University of the Aegean
95.6 MHz	Anemos Radio	2008	Greek music; rebroadcasting with Rythmos FM 9,49
99.8 MHz	2000 FM	1990	News and talk; rebroadcasting with Parapolitika FM
102.0 MHz	Radio Samos	1989	News, talk and Greek music; rebroadcasting with Mega News 104.6 from Athens
102.4 MHz	Radio Café	2010	Rebroadcasting with Skai 100.3 and NG Radio Athens
102.5 MHz	ERT News Radio	15 September 2025	National; news and talk; first station of Greek state radio
103.2 MHz	Armonia FM Samos	1999	News and talk; rebroadcasting with Alpha 98.9 FM Athens
104.8 MHz	Second Programme	11 May 1952	National; Greek music; second station of Greek state radio
106.8 MHz	ERA Sport	3 May 1993	National; sports & talk; fourth station of Greek state radio

== Radio stations in the Ionian islands ==
=== Prefecture of Corfu ===
Frequency	Name	On air since	Description
87.6 MHz	Studio 1	1997	News & talk with Greek music; located from Achilleio
88.8 MHz	Star FM 88,8	1993	Foreign top 40, pop and rock music; located from Corfu
89.8 MHz	Third Programme	19 September 1954	National; classical music; third station of Greek state radio
90.3 MHz	Kyma FM Stereo	2004	Greek éntekhno (ex. Radio Kerkyra – formerly on 90,1)
91.1 MHz	Agios Spyridon	1999	Religious radio; rebroadcasting with Ecclesia Athens
91.8 MHz	ERT News Radio	15 September 2025	National; news and talk; first station of Greek state radio
93.8 MHz	Second Programme	11 May 1952	National; Greek music; second station of Greek state radio
95.8 MHz	Kiis Extra FM Corfu	8 January 2016	Foreign music; rebroadcasting with Kiis Extra 9,22 Patras
97.5 MHz	Corfu DeeJay 97,5	2014	Foreign music; rebroadcasting with 95.2 Athens DeeJay
97.9 MHz	Corfu NEW Radio	1997	Greek pop music; rebroadcasting with Mega News 104.6
98.4 MHz	Zoom Radio 98.4	2021	Greek and foreign pop (ex. Gaga/Max – formerly 101.1)
98.8 MHz	Radio Eptanisa	1999	News and talk; rebroadcasting with Real FM 97,8 Athens
99.3 MHz	ERT Corfu 99.3	1957	News, talk and culture; Local station of Greek state radio
99.7 MHz	Rythmos 99.7	1992	Greek music; rebroadcasting with Rythmos 9,49 of Athens
101.1 MHz	ERA Sport	3 May 1993	National; sports and talk; fourth station of Greek state radio
102.2 MHz	POP FM 102.2	1994	Greek pop music (formerly broadcast on 102.1 and 104.1)
102.9 MHz	Life Radio 102.9	1992	News and talk; rebroadcasting with Parapolitika FM 90.1
105.5 MHz	Radio Lefkimmi	1999	Greek pop and rock music (ex. Rainbow FM Corfu)

=== Prefecture of Kefallonia ===
Frequency	Name	On air since	Description
89.2 MHz	IN Kefalonia 89,2 FM	2015	News and talk; rebroadcasting with Real FM Athens
90.8 MHz	Ionian Galaxy 90.8	1992	News and talk; rebroadcasting with Pepper Athens
93.2 MHz	ERT Zakynthos	1969	News and talk; Local station of Greek state radio
93.9 MHz	Nisi 93.9 FM	2020	News and talk; rebroadcasting with Rythmos Athens
96.5 MHz	Cosmos Radio	1995	News and talk; rebroadcasting with Skai 100.3 Athens
96.9 MHz	ERT News Radio	15 September 2025	National; news and talk; first station of Greek state radio
98.3 MHz	Palmos FM Stereo	2014	Greek pop music; rebroadcasting with Sfera 102,2 Athens
98.9 MHz	Second Programme	11 May 1952	National; Greek music; second station of Greek state radio
100.6 MHz	Kiss FM Cephalonia	2003	Foreign pop music; rebroadcasting with Kiss 92,9 Athens
103.0 MHz	H.M. of Cephalonia	1994	Religious radio; rebroadcasting with Ecclesia FM 89,5
104.2 MHz	Third Programme	19 September 1954	National; classical music; third station of Greek state radio
106.8 MHz	ERA Sport	3 May 1993	National; sports and talk; fourth station of Greek state radio

=== Prefecture of Lefkada ===
Frequency	Name	On air since	Description
90.5 MHz	Lefkatas	1992	Greek pop music; rebroadcasting with Athens 98.4 FM
96.7 MHz	Radio Karya	1996	News and talk; rebroadcasting with Mega News 104.6 from Athens
101.9 MHz	Rythmos	2016	Greek music; rebroadcasting with Rythmos FM Athens

=== Prefecture of Zakynthos ===
Frequency	Name	On air since	Description
88.6 MHz	Island Radio	2005	Foreign music; rebroadcasting with Sport FM 94,6 Athens
89.6 MHz	Bravo FM 89.6	2008	Greek pop and rock music (ex. Shock Radio Zakynthos)
90.2 MHz	Prisma FM 90.2	2022	News and talk; rebroadcasting with Alpha Radio 98.9
91.8 MHz	Ermis FM 91.8	1995	News and talk; rebroadcasting with Skai 100.3
94.3 MHz	Rythmos 94,3	1996	Greek pop music; located from Zakynthos
95.2 MHz	ERT Zakynthos	1969	News and talk; Local station of Greek state radio
97.6 MHz	Stigma FM 97.6	1997	News and talk; rebroadcasting with Parapolitika Radio

== Radio stations in the Peloponnese ==
=== Prefecture of Achaia ===
Frequency	Name	On air since	Description
87.9 MHz	ERA Sport	3 May 1993	National; sports and talk; fourth station of Greek state radio
88.2 MHz	Faros FM 88,2	2023	Religious radio; rebroadcasting with Christianity 104.3 Athens
88.5 MHz	Apostoliki Ecclesia	1989	Religious radio; rebroadcasting with Ecclesia 89.5 of Athens
88.8 MHz	Melody FM Patras	1993	Foreign music; rebroadcasting with Mad Radio of Athens
89.4 MHz	SKAI FM Patras	2002	News and talk; rebroadcasting with Skai 100.3 of Athens
90.0 MHz	Skylos 90 FM	2019	Greek music; rebroadcasting with Mousikos Web Radio
90.2 MHz	Master 90.2	1998	Foreign pop and rock music; located from Aigio
90.4 MHz	Imera-Molonoti	2021	Foreign music (ex. Laikos, Click, UP Radio & Imera)
91.2 MHz	Super Fresh 91.2	2022	Foreign music (ex. Yes, Life Radio – formerly on 107.7)
91.2 MHz	Diakonia & Martyria	1990	Religious station; rebroadcasting with Peiraiki Ecclesia
91.5 MHz	Radio 9,15 Achaia	2005	Greek pop and rock music (ex. Radio TV Press 9,77)
91.7 MHz	Radio Enter 91.7	1 February 2013	Foreign electronic and disco music (ex. A-Heaps)
92.2 MHz	Kiis Extra 9.22	2016	Foreign pop and rock music (ex. Kiss FM Patras 9.22)
92.5 MHz	ERT Patras	1950	News, talk and music; Local station of Greek state radio
92.8 MHz	Dytika 92.8	1999	News and talk; rebroadcasting with Skai 100.3 of Athens
93.0 MHz	TOP 93 MHz	1993	Foreign electronic, disco – pop music; located from Patras
93.4 MHz	MAX FM 93.4	1989	News and talk; rebroadcasting with Parapolitika FM Athens
93.9 MHz	ERT Patras	1950	News, talk and music; Local station of Greek state radio
94.0 MHz	Radio Gamma	1988	News and talk; rebroadcasting with Focus FM 103.6
94.4 MHz	Alpha Patras	2001	News and talk; rebroadcasting with Alpha 98.9 Athens
94.9 MHz	Rythmos Radio	2005	Greek music; relays of the namesake station from Athens
95.3 MHz	Oxygen FM 95.3	1990	Greek laïko, rebetiko – éntekhno music; located from Patras
96.3 MHz	Sport FM 96,3	2004	Sports and talk; rebroadcasting with Sport FM 94,6 of Athens
96.6 MHz	Sfera FM Patras	2003	Greek music; rebroadcasting with Sfera FM 102,2 of Athens
97.4 MHz	Wave FM 97.4	2005	Greek and foreign rock music (ex. Melodia FM of Patras)
98.0 MHz	Radio Messatida	1998	Greek traditional & skiladiko music; located from Ovrya
98.2 MHz	Loud FM 98.2	2017	Foreign music; rebroadcasting with Athens DeeJay
98.7 MHz	Thema FM Patra	2017	News and talk ; rebroadcasting with Mega News 104.6 from Athens
99.2 MHz	Radio Aigio	1962	News, talk and Greek music; located from Aigio
99.7 MHz	Fasma FM 99.7	1992	Greek pop and rock music; located from Patras
100.4 MHz	Melodia Patras	2005	Greek music; rebroadcasting with Melodia Athens
100.7 MHz	Anoixi 100,7	6 August 2018	Greek and foreign music; relays of Next Generation
101.1 MHz	Free FM Patras	2013	Foreign pop and rock music (ex. Studio 20 FM Patras)
102.1 MHz	Chroma FM Patras	2010	Greek pop and rock music (ex. Radio Cosmos 102.1 FM)
102.3 MHz	Second Programme	11 May 1952	National; Greek music; second station of Greek state radio
102.7 MHz	Picasso FM 102.7	2020	Greek and foreign music; rebroadcasting with Love 97.5
103.3 MHz	Mousiki Lampsi	1993	Greek laïko, pop and rock music; located from Patras
103.7 MHz	UP FM Patras	2013	Student radio station from the University of Patras
103.9 MHz	Peloponnisos	2022	News and talk; rebroadcasting with Athens 98.4 FM
104.3 MHz	ERT News Radio	15 September 2025	National; news and talk; first station of Greek state radio
104.8 MHz	Firma Radio Patras	2025	Greek music; rebroadcasting with Blackman 107,5 Athens
105.3 MHz	Antenna Patras	1991	News and talk; rebroadcasting with Real FM 97,8 of Athens
105.7 MHz	Derti 105.7	2012	Greek laïko (ex. Sentra FM, Beautiful, Love, Diavlos 513)
106.1 MHz	Galaxy FM 106.1	2007	Foreign music; rebroadcasting with Galaxy 92 Athens
106.5 MHz	Radio Patra	2009	Greek laïko music (ex. Proto Kanali & Helianthus FM 106.5)
107.7 MHz	Sto Kokkino 107.7	2014	News and talk; rebroadcasting with 105.5 Sto Kokkino of Athens

=== Prefecture of Arcadia ===
Frequency	Name	On air since	Description
87.7 MHz	Firma FM 104.8	2025	Rebroadcasting with Blackman 107,5 of Athens
88.0 MHz	Life FM Kalamata	1997	Foreign pop and rock music; located from Kalamata
88.3 MHz	ERT News Radio	15 September 2025	National; news and talk; first station of Greek state radio
89.0 MHz	Kiss FM Kalamata	2002	Foreign music; rebroadcasting with Kiss 92.9 from Athens
90.3 MHz	Third Programme	19 September 1954	National; classical music; third station of Greek state radio
90.9 MHz	Orthodoxi Martyria	1999	Religious radio; rebroadcasting with Peiraiki Ecclesia 912
91.5 MHz	Tripoli Radio 91,5	1988	News, talk and Greek music; Tripoli's Municipal Station
92.6 MHz	Blue Radio 92,6fm	1989	Foreign dance, pop and rock music; located from Tripoli
93.8 MHz	Arcadia FM 93,8	2014	News and talk; rebroadcasting with Real 97,8 from Athens
95.3 MHz	ERA Sport	3 May 1993	National; sports and talk; fourth station of Greek state radio
95.9 MHz	Arcadian Radio	1991	News and talk; rebroadcasting with Bwin Sport FM 94,6
96.5 MHz	Horizon Radio	1992	Greek music; rebroadcasting with Mega News 104.6
98.2 MHz	Ecclesia 98,2	1999	Religious station; rebroadcasting with Peiraiki Ecclesia
98.5 MHz	Aroma Radio	2014	Greek éntekhno and laïko music (ex. Positive FM Stereo)
99.7 MHz	Diavlos ENA	1989	Religious radio; rebroadcasting with Christianity Athens
100.1 MHz	Asteras Tripolis	2009	Foreign music; rebroadcasting with En Lefko 87,7fm
100.8 MHz	Amateur Musician	1999	Amateur radio station with Greek laïko – rebetiko
101.1 MHz	Firma FM 104.8	2025	Rebroadcasting with Blackman 107,5 of Athens
101.5 MHz	ERT Tripolis	1949	News and talk; Local station of Greek state radio
102.8 MHz	SKAI FM Arcadia	1989	News and talk; rebroadcasting with Skai 100.3 Athens
103.1 MHz	Megalopoli 103,1fm	1992	News and talk with Greek music; located from Megalopolis
103.5 MHz	Second Programme	11 May 1952	National; Greek music; second station of Greek state radio
103.8 MHz	City 103.8 Messinia	1991	Foreign music; rebroadcasting with 102.5fm Radio Athens
104.6 MHz	Ellada FM Arcadia	2021	News and talk; rebroadcasting with Interwetten Sports FM
104.9 MHz	Radio DJ 105 FM	1998	Greek laïko – pop & rock music; located from Megalopolis
105.2 MHz	ERT News Radio	15 September 2025	National; news and talk; first station of Greek state radio
105.7 MHz	Kosmos 93.6	29 October 2001	Foreign world music; sixth station of Greek state radio
106.1 MHz	Diva FM	1994	Greek laïko and pop music; located from Tripoli

=== Prefecture of Argolis ===
Frequency	Name	On air since	Description
89.6 MHz	Style FM Argolida	1992	Foreign music; rebroadcasting with 102.5 Radio Athens
90.5 MHz	ERT News Radio	15 September 2025	National; news and talk; first station of Greek state radio
90.7 MHz	Cool FM 90.7	1994	Foreign electronica and dance music; located from Kefalari
91.2 MHz	ERT Tripolis	1949	News, talk and entertainment; Local station of Greek state radio
91.8 MHz	Galaxias 9.18	2006	Greek traditional & laïko (formerly on 91.1 – ex. Orange, Fasma)
92.2 MHz	DRi News Radio	1990	News and talk with Greek pop music; located from Argos
92.9 MHz	Star FM Argolida	1990	Greek pop and rock music; located from Nafplio
93.8 MHz	Epidavros Radio	1996	News and talk; located from Palaia Epidavros
93.8 MHz	Extra / Firma	2020	Rebroadcasting with Blackman FM 107,5 from Athens
94.4 MHz	Sfera Radio 9,44	2002	Greek music; rebroadcasting with Sfera FM 102,2 Athens
95.8 MHz	Anatolikos FM 95.8	2005	Greek éntekhno; rebroadcasting with Melodia Radio Athens
97.0 MHz	Must FM Argolidas	1997	Greek pop music; based in Merbaka with studio from Nafplio
97.4 MHz	Third Programme	19 September 1954	National; classical music; third station of Greek state radio
98.1 MHz	Echo FM 98.1	1991	Greek laïko and rebetiko music; located from Inachos
98.5 MHz	Aroma FM 98.5	2014	Greek éntekhno and laïko (ex. Positive Radio 98.5)
99.0 MHz	Sport FM Argolida	2000	Sports, news, talk and Greek music; located from Argos
99.4 MHz	Second Programme	11 May 1952	National; Greek music; second station of Greek state radio
99.7 MHz	Diavlos 1 Arcadias	1989	Religious radio; rebroadcasting with Christianity of Athens
101.2 MHz	ERT News Radio	15 September 2025	National; news and talk; first station of Greek state radio
102.0 MHz	SKAI FM Argolida	1989	News and talk; rebroadcasting with Skai 100.3 Athens
102.6 MHz	Second Programme	11 May 1952	National; Greek music; second station of Greek state radio
102.8 MHz	SKAI FM Arcadia	1989	News and talk; rebroadcasting with Skai 100.3 Athens
103.2 MHz	ERA Sport	3 May 1993	National; sports and talk; fourth station of Greek state radio
103.8 MHz	Argolida 103.8	2020	News and talk; rebroadcasting with Sport 94.6 and NG Athens
104.3 MHz	Radio Ermionida	1989	Greek pop and rock music; based in Argos, studio from Kranidi
105.2 MHz	H.M. of Argolida	1991	Religious station; rebroadcasting with Peiraiki Ecclesia 91.2fm
106.6 MHz	ERA Sport	3 May 1993	National; sports and talk; fourth station of Greek state radio
107.1 MHz	Kranidi FM	1992	News and talk; rebroadcasting with Athens 98.4 FM

=== Prefecture of Ilia ===
Frequency	Name	On air since	Description
91.1 MHz	Ilida Radio 9,11	1952	Ilida municipal radio; rebroadcasting with Melodia 99.2 Athens
92.3 MHz	ORT FM 92,3	1993	News, talk and music; rebroadcasting with Skai 100.3 Athens
95.5 MHz	Ionion FM	1989	News, talk and music; rebroadcasting with Real 97.8 Athens
98.6 MHz	Ellada FM	2021	News and talk; rebroadcasting with Interwetten Sports 94.3
99.4 MHz	Greca FM	1992	Greek pop and rock music; located from Krestena
99.9 MHz	Enallax 99,9	1999	Foreign pop and rock music; located from Amaliada
101.3 MHz	Kefi FM 101.3	2013	Greek laïko music (ex. Kiss FM and Radio Krestena)
102.0 MHz	Amaliada 102	2011	Greek and foreign pop music (ex. Kardamas FM 102)
102.5 MHz	ERT Pyrgos	1954	News and culture; Local station of Greek state radio
103.3 MHz	VOX 103.3	2011	Rebroadcasting with Imagine 89,7 and NG Radio
105.1 MHz	Venus FM	1999	Foreign pop music; located from Amaliada
105.5 MHz	Aquarius FM	1992	Greek pop music; located from Amaliada
107.1 MHz	Laikos FM 107,1	2018	Greek laïko music (ex. Mini FM 107,1 Krestena)
107.6 MHz	TO FOS FM Stereo	1992	Religious; rebroadcasting with Ecclesia FM 89.5 Athens

=== Prefecture of Korinthia ===
Frequency	Name	On air since	Description
87.5 MHz	LRadio 87.5 FM	2008	Greek pop and rock music (ex. Skyline FM Korinthos)
87.9 MHz	Eco Radio 87.9	2013	News and talk; rebroadcasting with Athens 98.4 FM
89.1 MHz	Epikinonia FM	1993	Greek pop and rock music; located from Loutraki
89.6 MHz	MY Radio 89.6	2008	News and talk; rebroadcasting with Skai 100.3
90.5 MHz	RTP Center FM	1995	Greek and foreign pop music; located from Corinth
91.2 MHz	Orthodox Church	1999	Religious radio; rebroadcasting with Peiraiki Ecclesia
91.8 MHz	Orthodoxy 91.8fm	1999	Religious radio; rebroadcasting with Ecclesia FM Athens
93.8 MHz	Extra / Firma FM	2020	Greek music; rebroadcasting with Blackman 107,5 Athens
94.2 MHz	Radio DeeJay	1996	Foreign music; based in Corinth with studio from Loutraki
95.0 MHz	Aktina Radio	1989	Foreign pop and rock music; located from Corinth
95.5 MHz	Akroama 95.5	1989	Greek laïko, pop and rock music; located from Corinth
95.8 MHz	Info Radio 95.8	2011	News and talk; rebroadcasting with Mega News 104.6
96.4 MHz	Just FM Korinthos	2007	News and talk with foreign pop music (ex. Proto Kanali)
96.9 MHz	Loutraki Radio 96.9	1989	Greek and foreign pop music; located from Loutraki
97.9 MHz	ERT News Radio	15 September 2025	National; news and talk; first station of Greek state radio
98.2 MHz	Palmos FM	2012	Greek pop and rock music; rebroadcasting with NG Athens
98.8 MHz	Electra FM 9,88	1988	News and talk; rebroadcasting with Sport FM 94,6 of Athens
99.9 MHz	Second Programme	11 May 1952	National; Greek music; second station of Greek state radio
100.8 MHz	Brake FM 100,8	2008	Greek pop and rock music (ex. Derveni 88.4, Evrostina)
102.7 MHz	Radio Morias	2009	Greek music (ex. Eroticos and Melody FM 102.7)
103.1 MHz	Pena FM 103,1	2015	Greek laïko music (ex. Life FM, Radio Xylokastro)
103.5 MHz	Anamnisi FM	1990	Greek laïko and rebetiko music (ex. Mousiko Kanali)
104.1 MHz	Super FM 104,1	2002	News and talk; rebroadcasting with Easy 97.2 of Athens
105.0 MHz	ERA Sport	3 May 1993	National; sports and talk; fourth station of Greek state radio
105.6 MHz	Diolkos FM 105.6	2023	News and talk with Greek music (ex. Korinthos Radio)
106.4 MHz	Energeia FM 106.4	2004	Greek music (ex. Youth FM 106.4 Korinthos)
106.8 MHz	Radio Goiteia 106.8	1999	Greek traditional & skiladiko; located from Kryoneri
107.3 MHz	Alfa & Omega 107,3	1999	Free Evangelical Churches radio; located from Corinth
107.6 MHz	Nemea Radio 107.6	2002	Greek pop and rock music (ex. Nemea TOP FM 107.6)

=== Prefecture of Lakonia ===
Frequency	Name	On air since	Description
88.5 MHz	Asteri FM Lakonia	1989	News and talk with foreign pop music; located from Areopoli
88.8 MHz	Ecclesia Spartis	1997	Religious; rebroadcasting with Ecclesia FM 89.5 of Athens
89.7 MHz	FLY FM 89,7	14 October 1991	News and talk; rebroadcasting with Skai 100.3 of Athens
90.7 MHz	Politeia Radio	1999	News & talk; rebroadcasts Athens 98.4 FM & NG Radio
91.0 MHz	ERT News Radio	15 September 2025	National; news and talk; first station of Greek state radio
93.0 MHz	Second Programme	11 May 1952	National; Greek music; second station of Greek state radio
94.5 MHz	Mousikos Palmos 94.5	1988	News and talk; rebroadcasting with 105,5 sto Kokkino Athens
94.9 MHz	South (Notos) 94.9 fm	2007	News and talk; rebroadcasting with Real FM 97,8 of Athens
97.2 MHz	ANT1 South Greece	1992	News and talk; rebroadcasting with Parapolitika FM 90.1
98.3 MHz	Melodia Radio 98.3	1999	Greek laïko-éntekhno-rebetiko; located from Magoula
98.7 MHz	Melodia Radio 98.3	1999	Greek laïko-éntekhno-rebetiko; located from Magoula
100.8 MHz	Camelot FM 100,8	1987	Greek and foreign music (ex. Radio Kythira 100,8 FM)
102.3 MHz	Planet FM 102.3	2013	Greek laïko and rebetiko music (ex. Radio Vatika 102.1)
103.7 MHz	Best FM 103.9	1996	Greek and foreign music; rebroadcasting with Sfera 102.2
103.9 MHz	Best FM 103.9	1996	Greek and foreign music; rebroadcasting with Sfera 102.2
104.8 MHz	ERA Sport	3 May 1993	National; sports and talk; fourth station of Greek state radio
105.6 MHz	Tsirigo FM	1988	News and talk; rebroadcasting with Alpha 98.9 from Athens
107.3 MHz	Adelin FM	1988	News and talk with Greek laïko music; rebroadcasting with Mega News 104.6

=== Prefecture of Messinia ===
Frequency	Name	On air since	Description
87.6 MHz	Firma FM 104,8	2025	Rebroadcasting with Blackman 107,5 Athens
88.0 MHz	Life Radio 88	1997	Foreign pop and rock music; located from Kalamata
88.8 MHz	Pylos Live	2011	Electronic and alternative rock music; located from Pylos
89.0 MHz	Kiss Messinia	2002	Foreign music; rebroadcasting with Kiss 92.9 from Athens
89.3 MHz	Third Programme	19 September 1954	National; classical music; third station of Greek state radio
89.8 MHz	Amateur Musician	1999	Amateur radio station with Greek laïko – rebetiko music
90.5 MHz	Palmos Radio 90,5	1999	News, talk with Greek laïko; located from Kalamata
90.9 MHz	Time 90.9 Kalamata	1994	Greek music; rebroadcasting with Love Radio of Athens
91.8 MHz	Emphasis FM 91.8	2005	Greek music; rebroadcasting with Chroma 102,1 of Patra
92.2 MHz	ERT News Radio	15 September 2025	National; news and talk; first station of Greek state radio
92.7 MHz	Amateur Musician	1999	Amateur radio station with Greek laïko – rebetiko music
93.6 MHz	Kyparissia FM 9,36	1992	News and talk with Greek music; located from Kyparissia
94.2 MHz	Second Programme	11 May 1952	National; Greek music; second station of Greek state radio
94.8 MHz	Kanali 1 Kalamatas	1989	News and talk; rebroadcasting with Next Generation Athens
95.7 MHz	Aroma Messinias	2021	Greek music; rebroadcasting with Aroma 98,5 from Tripolis
96.4 MHz	Skai Messinias	1994	News and talk; rebroadcasting with Skai 100.3 of Athens
97.3 MHz	Best FM 97.3	1991	Foreign pop music; rebroadcasting with Best FM 92.6
98.1 MHz	Apollon 98.1	1991	Greek and foreign music; located from Kalamata
99.2 MHz	Diavlos FM	1994	Greek laïko and rebetiko; located from Kalamata
99.6 MHz	Focus 99,6 fm	2019	News and talk; rebroadcasting with Mega News 104.6 fm
100.4 MHz	ERA Sport	3 May 1993	National; sports and talk; fourth station of Greek state radio
102.0 MHz	Christian Home	1997	Religious station; rebroadcasting with Ecclesia 895 Athens
103.3 MHz	Music FM	1995	Pirate radio with Greek and foreign music from Kalamata
103.8 MHz	City FM Stereo	1991	Foreign music; rebroadcasting with 102.5 from Athens
104.4 MHz	ERT Kalamata	1986	News and talk; Local station of Greek state radio
107.2 MHz	ERT Kalamata	1986	News and talk; Local station of Greek state radio
107.5 MHz	Kanali 20 FM	1992	Greek music; rebroadcasting with Sfera Athens

== Radio stations in Central Greece ==
=== Prefecture of Aitoloakarnania ===
Frequency	Name	On air since	Description
88.3 MHz	Radiofonia Xiromerou 88,3	1999	Greek traditional and laïko; located from Fyteies
88.9 MHz	ERT News Radio	15 September 2025	National; news and talk; first station of Greek state radio
89.2 MHz	Glenti 89.2 Agrinio	2011	Greek traditional & skiladiko music (ex. Smile FM & Diavlos)
90.7 MHz	Cosmos FM Agrinio	1992	News and talk; rebroadcasting with Ellinikos FM 93,2 Athens
91.3 MHz	Second Programme	11 May 1952	National; Greek music; second station of Greek state radio
92.0 MHz	Missolonghi 92 FM	1960	News and talk with Greek music; located from Missolonghi
92.8 MHz	Dytika tis Ellados	1999	News and talk; rebroadcasting with Skai 100.3 of Athens
93.7 MHz	Agrinio FM 93.7	1989	News and talk; rebroadcasting with Sport FM of Athens
94.2 MHz	Energy Radio	1995	News and talk; rebroadcasting with Real 97.8 Athens
94.7 MHz	Rythmos 94.7	1999	Greek traditional and skiladiko; located from Agrinio
95.1 MHz	Music Life 95.1	1999	Greek and foreign pop and rock; located from Agrinio
96.0 MHz	Monadiki Politeia	1999	Orthodox religious radio station; located from Nafpaktos
97.1 MHz	Akarnania FM	1989	News and talk with Greek music; rebroadcasting with Mega News 104.6 fm
97.3 MHz	ERA Sport	3 May 1993	National; sports and talk; fourth station of Greek state radio
97.8 MHz	Live FM	1999	Greek laïko, rebetiko and pop music; located from Agrinio
98.2 MHz	Loud 98.2	2017	Foreign music; rebroadcasting with 95.2 Athens DeeJay
98.4 MHz	Acheloos FM	1992	News and talk with Greek music; located from Agrinio
99.5 MHz	Aeras FM 99.5	1997	News and talk with Greek music; located from Agrinio
100.3 MHz	ERT Ioannina	1949	News and talk; Local station of Greek state radio
100.9 MHz	Kefi Agrinio	2014	Greek laïko music; rebroadcasting with Kefi 101.3
101.4 MHz	Lepanto FM	1989	Rebroadcasting with Alpha 98.9 and NG Web Radio
101.7 MHz	Orama Radio	1987	News and talk; rebroadcasting with Focus Thessaloniki
102.5 MHz	Third Programme	19 September 1954	National; classical music; third station of Greek state radio
103.5 MHz	Antenna Star 103,5	1988	News and talk; rebroadcasting with Parapolitika FM Athens
104.5 MHz	2Day 104,5 Radio	2025	Greek music; rebroadcasting with Love Radio 97,5 Athens
106.3 MHz	Ecclesia 106,3	2010	Religious radio; rebroadcasting with Ecclesia FM Athens
107.0 MHz	MAD Radio	17 August 2013	Foreign pop music; rebroadcasting with MAD Athens
107.4 MHz	Aria 107.4	1995	Greek music; rebroadcasting with Sfera Athens

=== Prefecture of Evia ===
Frequency	Name	On air since	Description
88.2 MHz	Dalkas FM Halkida	2009	Greek laïko music (ex. Evia Top FM 88.2, Echo Radio 88.2)
88.7 MHz	Second Programme	11 May 1952	National; Greek music; second station of Greek state radio
89.1 MHz	Home Radio 89,1	2014	Foreign pop and rock music (ex. Evia POP FM Stereo)
89.6 MHz	LIVE FM 89.6	1996	Greek pop and rock music; located from Chalcis
90.0 MHz	Kanali Evripos	1993	Greek pop and rock music; located from Chalcis
90.7 MHz	Radio Blackman	1990	Greek music (formerly on 103.1, 103.2, 103.3 & 104.9)
91.1 MHz	Halkida Polis Radio	2022	Greek music; rebroadcasting with Rythmos 949 Athens
93.0 MHz	Halkida Just Radio 93	2007	Foreign pop and rock music (ex. Evia Kiss FM, Radiorama)
94.1 MHz	Orthodox Presence	1993	Religious radio; rebroadcasting with Peiraiki Ecclesia 91.2
94.2 MHz	Heart FM Halkida	2013	Greek music (ex. Avanti 94.2 and Evian Channel)
95.0 MHz	NRG Radio 95	2004	Foreign pop music (ex. Gerrone FM 104,8)
95.4 MHz	Nea Styra 95,4	1988	Greek pop and rock music; located from Styra
96.5 MHz	Workers' Radio	12 November 1991	Athens 98.4 FM, ERT Open and NG Radio relays
96.9 MHz	Armonia Radio	1992	News and talk with Greek laïko; located from Chalcis
97.7 MHz	Agios Timotheos	1993	Religious; rebroadcasting with Ecclesia FM Athens
98.1 MHz	Halkida Radio Ena	1990	News and talk; rebroadcasting with Real FM 97,8
99.0 MHz	Halkida Blue 99 FM	2015	Greek music; rebroadcasting with Sfera 102,2
99.1 MHz	Radio Harama 99,1	1988	Greek laïko and rebetiko; located from Istiaia
99.5 MHz	Peiratikos Athens	16 December 2017	Greek laïko music (ex. Vima FM, City & Planet)
100.0 MHz	Kosmos fm 100	1988	News/talk with Greek music; located from Chalcis
100.3 MHz	Skai 100.3	1988	News and talk; Deutsche Welle, BBC, VOA relays
100.4 MHz	Istiaia FM	1992	Greek and foreign pop music; located from Istiaia
101.2 MHz	Kiss 1012	2025	Foreign music; rebroadcasting with Kiss FM Athens
102.1 MHz	Orama FM	1988	News and talk with Greek music; located from Istiaia
102.2 MHz	Aliveri Radio	1988	News and talk with Greek music; located from Aliveri
102.4 MHz	B19 Radio 102.4	1985	Pirate radio station with Greek laïko & rebetiko music
103.2 MHz	Ptisi (Fly FM) 103.2	1993	News and talk with Greek music; located from Aliveri
103.5 MHz	HIT FM 103.5 Halkida	2007	Foreign pop music (ex. Kanali 103 fm Stereo Evia)
103.9 MHz	Tamynaiki FM 103,9	1995	Greek and foreign pop music; located from Aliveri
104.1 MHz	Radio Evia 104.1	1992	Greek laïko, pop and rock music; located from Chalcis
104.2 MHz	ERT News Radio	15 September 2025	National; news and talk; first station of Greek state radio
104.8 MHz	Shock FM 104.8	2002	Greek laïko, pop and rock music (ex. Radio Artaki 95 FM)
105.3 MHz	Amarynthos 105,3	1990	Greek laïko, pop and rock music; located from Amarynthos
107.5 MHz	Orthodox Presence	1993	Religious radio; rebroadcasting with Peiraiki Ecclesia 91.2

=== Prefecture of Evrytania ===
Frequency	Name	On air since	Description
97.5 MHz	Karpenisi FM	1988	News and talk; rebroadcasting with Parapolitika 90.1
99.2 MHz	ERT News Radio	15 September 2025	National; news and talk; first station of Greek state radio
103.1 MHz	Second Programme	11 May 1952	National; Greek music; second station of Greek state radio
104.9 MHz	Stoxos Karpenisi	2017	Greek and foreign music (ex. Super FM, Eurytus Radio)
105.4 MHz	Radio Voulpi	1999	Amateur radio station with Greek traditional music
106.6 MHz	ERT News Radio	15 September 2025	National; news and talk; first station of Greek state radio

=== Prefecture of Fokida ===
Frequency	Name	On air since	Description
88.2 MHz	Radio Faros 88,2	2023	Religious radio; rebroadcasting with Christianity 104.3 Athens
88.5 MHz	Apostoliki Ecclesia	1989	Religious radio; rebroadcasting with Ecclesia 89.5 of Athens
89.4 MHz	SKAI FM Patras	2002	News and talk; rebroadcasting with Skai 100.3 of Athens
90.0 MHz	Skylos FM	2019	Greek music; rebroadcasting with Mousikos FM Athens
91.5 MHz	Radio 9,15	2005	Greek pop and rock music (ex. Radio TV Press 9,77)
92.1 MHz	Galaxias FM	1993	News and talk; rebroadcasting with Skai 100.3
92.2 MHz	Kiis Extra 922	2016	Foreign pop and rock music (ex. Kiss FM Patras 922)
92.9 MHz	Lychnos Radio	2016	Religious radio; rebroadcasting with Christianity FM 104,3
93.0 MHz	TOP FM Stereo	1993	Foreign electronic, disco and pop music; located from Patras
93.4 MHz	Max 93.4 Stereo	1989	News and talk; rebroadcasting with Parapolitika FM Athens
94.2 MHz	Alpha FM 9,44	2001	News and talk; rebroadcasting with Alpha 98.9 of Athens
94.5 MHz	ERA Sport	3 May 1993	National; sports and talk; fourth station of Greek state radio
94.9 MHz	Rythmos Patras	2005	Greek pop music; relays of the namesake radio from Athens
96.3 MHz	Sport FM 96,3 Patras	2004	Sports and talk; rebroadcasting with Sport 94,6 from Athens
96.5 MHz	Second Programme	11 May 1952	National; Greek music; second station of Greek state radio
97.1 MHz	Sfera FM Patras	2003	Greek music; rebroadcasting with Sfera 102,2 of Athens
98.5 MHz	ERT News Radio	15 September 2025	National; news and talk; first station of Greek state radio
99.2 MHz	Radio Aigio 99,2	1962	News and talk with Greek music; located from Aigio
99.7 MHz	Fasma FM 99.7	1992	Greek pop and rock music; located from Patras
100.4 MHz	Melodia Patras	2005	Greek music; rebroadcasting with Melodia Athens
101.1 MHz	Free 1011 Patras	2013	Foreign pop and rock music (ex. Studio 20 FM Patras)
102.1 MHz	Chroma FM 102,1	2010	Greek pop and rock music (ex. Radio Cosmos 102.1 FM)
102.7 MHz	Picasso FM 102.7	2020	Greek and foreign music; rebroadcasting with Love 975
103.9 MHz	Peloponnisos FM	2022	News and talk; rebroadcasting with Athens 98.4 FM
104.4 MHz	Radio Amfissa	1989	News and talk; rebroadcasting with Real FM of Athens
104.8 MHz	Firma FM	2025	Greek music; rebroadcasting with Blackman FM Athens
105.3 MHz	Antenna 105.3	1991	News and talk; rebroadcasting with Real FM of Athens
105.7 MHz	Derti 105.7 Patras	2012	Greek laïko (ex. Sentra, Beautiful, Love, Diavlos 513)
107.0 MHz	ERT News Radio	15 September 2025	National; news and talk; first station of Greek state radio
107.7 MHz	Sto Kokkino	2014	News and talk; rebroadcasting with Sto Kokkino of Athens

=== Prefecture of Fthiotida ===
Frequency	Name	On air since	Description
87.7 MHz	Lamia Polis	2022	News, talk, Greek and foreign music (ex. Phase Radio)
88.0 MHz	Melodia Radio	1993	News and talk; rebroadcasts Melodia 99,2 and NG Radio
89.4 MHz	Ecclesia's Voice	1996	Religious; relays of the namesake radio station from Athens
90.3 MHz	Metro FM Lamia	2004	Greek pop music; rebroadcasting with Metro 94.2 of Larissa
90.9 MHz	Oscar FM 90.9	1997	Greek éntekhno-laïko, pop and rock; located from Komma
91.2 MHz	Lamia DeeJay	2008	Foreign music; rebroadcasting with 95.2 Athens DeeJay
92.1 MHz	Nova FM 92.1	1988	Greek and foreign music; rebroadcasts Real FM 97,8
92.4 MHz	NRG FM 92.4	1 October 2020	Foreign music; rebroadcasting with NRG 91 Larissa
93.8 MHz	Stylida Radio	1989	News and talk; rebroadcasting with Mega News 104.6 from Athens
94.1 MHz	Stylida Radio	1989	News and talk; rebroadcasting with Mega News 104.6 from Athens
94.6 MHz	Rythmos FM	2007	Sports and talk with Greek music (ex. Lamia FM34)
95.0 MHz	Glenti FM	2022	Greek traditional music; rebroadcasts Glenti Larissa
95.8 MHz	Fystiki Radio	2019	Greek and foreign music (ex. Loud Radio & TOP 9.55)
96.2 MHz	Lamia FM1	1988	News and talk; rebroadcasting with Skai 100.3 of Athens
97.1 MHz	Star FM 97.1	1992	News, talk, Greek and foreign music; located from Lamia
97.7 MHz	Avanti FM	2009	Foreign music; rebroadcasting with Avanti 107.6 Larissa
98.0 MHz	Radio Roumeli	1989	News and talk; rebroadcasting with Alpha 98.9 from Athens
98.5 MHz	Chroma FM	2011	Greek and foreign music; rebroadcasts Chroma 105.8
99.3 MHz	City Radio 99.3	2014	Amateur radio station with Greek and foreign music
99.8 MHz	Cult Radio	2014	Greek and foreign music (ex. Magic 100, Kosmos FM)
100.6 MHz	Laikos FM 100.6	2014	Greek laïko; rebroadcasting with Laikos 105,7 of Larissa
101.0 MHz	101 Rock FM	2023	Foreign rock music; rebroadcasts 1055 Rock Thessaloniki
101.9 MHz	Radio NET 101,9	1998	News and talk; rebroadcasting with Sport FM of Athens
103.1 MHz	Blackman	1990	Greek music (formerly on 103.2, 103.3 & 104.9)
103.6 MHz	Orpheus 103,6fm	1997	Religious radio; rebroadcasting with Peiraiki Ecclesia

=== Prefecture of Viotia ===
Frequency	Name	On air since	Description
87.6 MHz	Blackman Athens	1990	Greek music (formerly on 103.1, 103.2, 103.3 & 104.9)
90.3 MHz	Ellinikos FM 88,7	2002	Greek music; rebroadcasting with Rythmos FM Athens
91.3 MHz	X-Radio Livadia	2002	Foreign pop and rock music (ex. Viotia TOP 104 FM)
92.0 MHz	City 92 Livadia	1999	Foreign music; rebroadcasting with En Lefko 87.7
92.4 MHz	NRG FM 92.4	1 October 2020	Foreign music; rebroadcasting with NRG 91 Larissa
92.7 MHz	Lychnos FM	2016	Religious radio; rebroadcasting with Christianity 104,3
92.9 MHz	Lychnos FM	2016	Religious radio; rebroadcasting with Christianity 104,3
95.0 MHz	Glenti FM	2022	Greek traditional music; rebroadcasts Glenti Larissa
95.8 MHz	Sirius FM 95,8	1994	News and talk; rebroadcasts Real FM, NG Radio
97.3 MHz	Radio Enosi	1994	News and talk; rebroadcasting with ERT Open
97.5 MHz	Radio Thiva 9,75	1989	News and talk; located from Thebes
98.2 MHz	Mega Radio	1992	Greek traditional music; located from Livadeia
99.2 MHz	Viotiki Ecclesia	1996	Religious radio; rebroadcasting with Peiraiki Ecclesia
101.0 MHz	101 Rock Fthiotida	2023	Foreign rock music; rebroadcasts 1055 Rock Thessaloniki
101.5 MHz	Second Programme	11 May 1952	National; Greek music; second station of Greek state radio
102.1 MHz	YOLO Radio 102,1	14 November 2015	Greek and foreign music (ex. Thiva Start FM 102,1 Stereo)
105.4 MHz	ERT News Radio	15 September 2025	National; news and talk; first station of Greek state radio
106.1 MHz	Radio Distomo	1966	Greek and foreign music; located from Distomo
107.4 MHz	ERA Sport	3 May 1993	Sports; fourth station of Greek state radio

== Radio stations in Crete ==
=== Prefecture of Chania ===
Frequency	Name	On air since	Description
87.5 MHz	Radio Amore	1999	Greek laïko and oldies; located from Theriso
87.8 MHz	Radio Amore	1999	Greek laïko and oldies; located from Theriso
88.8 MHz	Gavdos FM 88.8	1996	News and talk; rebroadcasting with Skai 100.3 Athens
89.3 MHz	Radio Palaiochora	2002	Greek and foreign music; rebroadcasting with NG Athens
89.6 MHz	Zarpa Radio 89.6	2020	News and talk; rebroadcasting with Real FM 97.8 of Athens
90.1 MHz	ERA Sport	3 May 1993	National; sports and talk; fourth station of Greek state radio
91.0 MHz	Venus 91 FM	1991	Greek laïko-éntekhno and pop music; located from Chania
91.5 MHz	Diktyo 91.5	2005	Greek music; rebroadcasting with Melodia 99,2 of Athens
91.8 MHz	Radio Faros	1999	Traditional Music of Crete (ex. Sky News, Radio Faros)
92.1 MHz	Christianity	1993	Religious by the Free Apostolic Church of Pentecost
92.4 MHz	Radio Rizites	1992	Traditional Music of Crete; located from Kissamos
92.9 MHz	ERT News Radio	15 September 2025	National; news and talk; first station of Greek state radio
93.2 MHz	Easy 93,2 Chania	2013	Foreign music; rebroadcasting with Easy 97.2 from Athens
93.5 MHz	Radio Entasi 93.5	1995	Student station from the Technical University of Crete
93.8 MHz	Kritikorama Radio	2000	Traditional Music of Crete (ex. Klik Radio 93.8)
94.4 MHz	Original FM Chania	1988	Greek and foreign music; rebroadcasting with Menta 88
94.9 MHz	Second Programme	11 May 1952	National; Greek music; second station of Greek state radio
95.5 MHz	Radio Martyria 9,55	1992	Religious radio; rebroadcasting with Fos FM 99,7 Heraklion
96.2 MHz	Decode 962 Chania	2003	Alternative rock and electronic music (ex. Paratiritis 96.2 fm)
96.8 MHz	Rock Radio Chania	2025	Pirate radio station from Chania; opens in the evening hours
97.1 MHz	ANT1 West Crete	1999	News and talk; rebroadcasting with Parapolitika 90.1 Athens
97.4 MHz	Notes FM 97.4	2024	Greek music; rebroadcasting with Notes 96 fm from Athens
97.7 MHz	Star FM 97,7	1994	Greek pop music; rebroadcasting with Sfera 102,2 Athens
98.2 MHz	Magic Radio	1993	Greek laïko, pop and rock music; located from Kissamos
98.9 MHz	Kriti FM 98,9	2021	Traditional Music of Crete; relays of Kriti 101 Heraklion
99.6 MHz	Thema Kritis	2026	News and talk; rebroadcasting with Thema FM 103,1
100.2 MHz	Max 100.2	1995	Greek and foreign music; located from Chania
100.6 MHz	ERT Chania	1947	News and talk; Local station of Greek state radio
101.5 MHz	Kriti FM 101.5	1989	Relays of the namesake radio station from Heraklion
101.9 MHz	Golden Radio	2022	Pirate radio station from Chania; opens in the evening
102.7 MHz	Chania Sport	2004	Sports and talk; rebroadcasting with Sport FM Athens
104.0 MHz	ERT Chania	1947	News and talk; Local station of Greek state radio
105.0 MHz	Fresh 105 Crete	2016	Foreign music (ex. Eros FM, TOP Channel)
105.4 MHz	Dromos FM Chania	2018	Greek music; rebroadcasting with Dromos FM Athens
106.0 MHz	Third Programme	19 September 1954	National; classical music; third station of Greek state radio
106.5 MHz	TOP FM 106.5	2015	Foreign music; rebroadcasting with Super FM Heraklion
107.3 MHz	AFN Souda Bay	1973	Station operated by the United States Armed Forces

=== Prefecture of Heraklion ===
Frequency	Name	On air since	Description
87.6 MHz	Creta Sport FM	1 June 1999	Sports, talk with Greek music; located from Heraklion
87.9 MHz	Erotokritos FM	2006	Cretan traditional music (ex. Hellas FM, formerly on 94)
88.1 MHz	FLY FM 88.1	2015	Foreign music; rebroadcasting with 95.2 Athens DeeJay
88.4 MHz	Radio Me	2022	News and talk; rebroadcasting with Mega News 104.6
88.7 MHz	Kritikos FM	1998	Cretan traditional music; located from Heraklion
89.2 MHz	Metro Radio	1997	Foreign pop and rock music; located from Heraklion
89.5 MHz	Radio Family	2011	Children's music; rebroadcasting with Athens 98.4 FM
89.8 MHz	Politica Radio	2019	News and talk; rebroadcasting with Real FM 97.8 Athens
90.4 MHz	Super FM 90.4	1994	Foreign world, pop & rock music; located from Heraklion
90.7 MHz	Dream 90.7 FM	1990	News and talk with Greek music; located from Tympaki
91.0 MHz	Anamnisi 91 FM	2006	Greek éntekhno and laïko music (ex. Radio Kastro 91)
91.3 MHz	Third Programme	19 September 1954	National; classical music; third station of Greek state radio
92.1 MHz	SKAI Radio Kritis	2002	News and talk; rebroadcasting with Skai 100.3 from Athens
92.5 MHz	Entexnos Radio	2022	Greek éntekhno music (ex. Pena, Max 925 & Radio Yparxo)
92.9 MHz	UP Radio 92.9	2018	Greek and foreign pop music (ex. Lampsi FM 92.9 Heraklion)
93.6 MHz	Candia FM 93.6	2014	News and talk with Greek music (ex. Entexnos & Radio 936)
93.9 MHz	ERA Sport	3 May 1993	National; sports and talk; fourth station of Greek state radio
94.4 MHz	ERT News Radio	15 September 2025	National; news and talk; first station of Greek state radio
94.7 MHz	Best Radio 94.7	1999	Foreign alternative rock music; located from Heraklion
95.0 MHz	Kardia 95 FM	2005	Greek and foreign music (ex. Kentro Kardias, Techni FM)
95.3 MHz	DRS FM 95.3	1984	Foreign electronic and disco music; located from Heraklion
95.8 MHz	Flash 9,58 Crete	2026	News and talk; rebroadcasting with Focus from Thessaloniki
96.1 MHz	Kiss FM 9,61 Crete	1997	Foreign pop music; rebroadcasting with Kiss FM 92.9 Athens
96.4 MHz	Second Programme	11 May 1952	National; Greek music; second station of Greek state radio
96.7 MHz	Ra.sta.pan.k. 96,7	2017	University of Crete's autonomous experimental station
97.1 MHz	Radio Moires	1992	News and talk with Greek music; located from Moires
97.2 MHz	Hersonissos 97.2	1998	News and talk with Greek music; located from Hersonissos
97.5 MHz	ERT Heraklion	1972	News, talk and Greek music; Local station of Greek state radio
97.9 MHz	Kritorama Radio	1996	Cretan traditional music; located from Heraklion
98.4 MHz	Heraklion 9.84 FM	1991	News, talk and Greek music; located from Nea Alikarnassos
98.7 MHz	Sfera FM Heraklion	2002	Greek music; rebroadcasting with Radio Sfera 102.2 Athens
99.2 MHz	Second Programme	11 May 1952	National; Greek music; second station of Greek state radio
99.7 MHz	To Fos tis Ecclesias	2013	Religious radio; rebroadcasting with Ecclesia FM 89,5
100.0 MHz	City FM Heraklion	2007	Greek and foreign pop music (ex. Flash Crete)
100.3 MHz	ERA Sport	3 May 1993	National; sports and talk; fourth station of Greek state radio
100.6 MHz	Knossos FM	1992	Greek and foreign pop music; located from Nea Alikarnassos
101.0 MHz	Kriti FM Stereo	2005	Cretan traditional music (formerly on 100.3 – ex. Capital Radio)
101.5 MHz	Radio Kriti 101.5	22 May 1989	News and talk with Greek music; located from Nea Alikarnassos
101.9 MHz	O Evdios Limin	2016	Religious radio station; rebroadcasting with Peiraiki Ecclesia
102.3 MHz	Creta One	2025	News and talk with Greek music (ex. New Radio 102,3)
102.8 MHz	Love Radio	2005	Greek and foreign music; relays of Love 97.5 Athens
103.1 MHz	Thema FM Kritis	2021	News and talk; rebroadcasting with Alpha of Athens
104.2 MHz	Athletic Radio Crete	6 May 2005	Sports and talk; rebroadcasting with Sport FM 94.6
104.5 MHz	Smart Radio 104.5	1 October 2018	Foreign pop and dance music (ex. Rythmos FM Kriti)
104.8 MHz	ERT News Radio	15 September 2025	National; news and talk; first station of Greek state radio
105.1 MHz	Mousiko Kanali	1993	Foreign music; rebroadcasting with 102.5 Radio from Athens
105.4 MHz	Studio FM1	1989	Foreign rock music; Student culture radio station from the HMU
105.6 MHz	ERT Heraklion	1972	News, talk and Greek music; Local station of Greek state radio
105.8 MHz	Music Club	1985	Greek laïko, pop and rock music (ex. Eros Radio Heraklion)
106.2 MHz	Alpha News 106.2	1999	News, talk, culture and Greek music (ex. Heraklion Radio)
106.6 MHz	Melodia FM	1996	Greek and foreign music; rebroadcasting with NG Radio
106.9 MHz	Ydrogeios 106.9	2003	News and talk with Greek music (ex. Stathmos Radio)
107.2 MHz	Ellinikos FM	1993	Greek laïko and pop music; located from Heraklion
107.7 MHz	Derti FM 107.7	2019	Greek laïko and rebetiko music (ex. Radio Lava)

=== Prefecture of Lasithi ===
Frequency	Name	On air since	Description
88.0 MHz	Radio Melody Crete	1997	Greek laïko, éntekhno, pop and rock music; located from Sitia
89.0 MHz	Second Programme	11 May 1952	National; Greek music; second station of Greek state radio
89.5 MHz	Radio Vereniki 89,5	1995	News and talk with Greek music; located from Ierapetra
89.9 MHz	ERT News Radio	15 September 2025	National; news and talk; first station of Greek state radio
90.6 MHz	Ecclesia 90,6	2024	Religious from the Holy Metropolis of Petra and Herronisos
91.9 MHz	ERA Sport	3 May 1993	National; sports and talk; fourth station of Greek state radio
92.3 MHz	Radio Lasithi	1989	News & talk with Greek pop music; located from Ierapetra
93.7 MHz	Panic FM 93.7	2019	Greek and foreign pop and rock music (ex. Club 93.7)
95.0 MHz	Madness 95	2006	Greek and foreign music (ex. Eastern Crete 95.8)
95.5 MHz	Sitia FM	1988	News and talk; rebroadcasting with Radio Kriti 101.5
96.9 MHz	Velvet FM	2025	Pirate radio station located from Agios Nikolaos, Crete
99.8 MHz	Echo FM 99.8	1994	News and talk; rebroadcasting with Parapolitika FM 90.1
100.0 MHz	Style FM Stereo	1992	News and Greek music; rebroadcasting with Sport FM 94.6
101.0 MHz	Kriti FM Stereo	2005	Cretan traditional music (formerly on 100.3 – ex. Capital FM)
101.5 MHz	Radio Kriti	22 May 1989	News, talk and Greek music; located from Nea Alikarnassos
102.2 MHz	Agyra Elpidos	1996	Religious station; rebroadcasting with Ecclesia FM 89.5
102.4 MHz	ERT Heraklion	1972	News and talk; Local station of Greek state radio
103.3 MHz	Lato FM 103,3	1992	News and talk; rebroadcasting with Real FM Athens
104.4 MHz	Agios Nikolaos	1989	News and talk; rebroadcasting with BBC World Service

=== Prefecture of Rethymno ===
Frequency	Name	On air since	Description
88.6 MHz	Talos 88.6	1999	Greek laïko and rebetiko; located from Mylopotamos
89.1 MHz	Matzore FM	2019	Student culture radio station from the University of Crete
89.8 MHz	Megalonisos	1999	Traditional Music of Crete (ex. Best Radio and Megalonisos)
90.7 MHz	Capital 90.7	1995	Greek and foreign pop & rock music; located from Rethymno
91.3 MHz	Sky Radio	1999	News and talk; rebroadcasting with Real FM 97,8 of Athens
92.6 MHz	Arkadi 92.6 fm	2013	Traditional Music of Crete (ex. Best 92.5, Derti, Arkadi FM)
93.6 MHz	Peiraiki Ecclesia	1988	Orthodox religious radio station by the Church of Piraeus
94.2 MHz	Hxos FM Kritis	1985	Greek pop music; rebroadcasting with Love Radio 97,5
95.9 MHz	Fly FM 9,59	1990	Greek and foreign pop music; located from Atsipopoulo
96.4 MHz	Astro Crete	1996	Greek and foreign pop music; located from Atsipopoulo
97.5 MHz	Phoenix 9,75	1999	Greek laïko and rebetiko; located from Plakias
98.0 MHz	Studio 98 MHz	1988	News and talk; rebroadcasting with Mega News 104.6
101.3 MHz	Mousiko Kanali	1985	Greek laïko and rebetiko music; located from Rethymno
102.0 MHz	Team 102 FM	1989	News and talk; rebroadcasting with Skai 100.3 of Athens
102.4 MHz	Notes FM	2024	Greek music; rebroadcasting with Notes Radio 96 Athens
102.6 MHz	Radiowaves	1981	Greek laïko and rebetiko; rebroadcasting with NG Web Radio
103.3 MHz	Central 103.3	2023	News & Greek music (ex. Rethymno Sport FM, Hot Radio 92.5)
103.7 MHz	Radio Yparxo	1999	Greek laïko and rebetiko music; located from Atsipopoulo
104.7 MHz	Alpha 104.7	1994	Greek music; rebroadcasting with Sfera FM Athens
106.8 MHz	Cool FM	1995	Greek and foreign music; located from Rethymno

== Radio stations in Epirus ==
=== Prefecture of Arta ===
Frequency	Name	On air since	Description
87.6 MHz	Radio 1	1995	Greek traditional and laïko; located from Korfovouni
91.9 MHz	Amvrakia FM	1987	Greek and foreign pop music; Arta's municipal station
92.3 MHz	Power FM 92,3	1993	Foreign music; rebroadcasting with Pepper FM 9,66
98.7 MHz	ERT Ioannina	1949	News and talk; Local station of Greek state radio
101.1 MHz	Melodia FM	1999	Greek traditional music; located from Korfovouni
101.5 MHz	News Radio	2022	News and talk; rebroadcasting with Real Athens
102.1 MHz	Music Radio	1991	Foreign music; rebroadcasting with Sport FM 94,6
103.1 MHz	Art FM 103,1	1988	News and talk; rebroadcasting with Melodia FM 99,2
105.0 MHz	TOP FM Stereo	1993	Greek and foreign pop – rock music; located from Arta
106.0 MHz	Pegasus 106 FM	1999	Greek music; rebroadcasting with Radio Epirus 94,5
106.6 MHz	Ecclesia 106,6	1999	Religious; rebroadcasting with Ecclesia FM 89,5

=== Prefecture of Ioannina ===
Frequency	Name	On air since	Description
88.2 MHz	ERT Ioannina	1949	News and talk; Local station of Greek state radio
89.0 MHz	Dryinoupolis 89	1990	Religious radio; rebroadcasting with Lydia FM Thessaloniki
89.6 MHz	Radio DeeJay	9 September 2009	Foreign pop-rock music; rebroadcasting with 95.2 Athens DeeJay
90.1 MHz	Vima Epirus	1989	News and talk; rebroadcasting with Skai 100.3 from Athens
90.2 MHz	ERT Ioannina	1949	News and talk; Local station of Greek state radio
90.7 MHz	4U Radio 90.7	2022	Greek music; rebroadcasting with 4U Radio 93.1
91.1 MHz	Kiss FM	2007	Foreign music; rebroadcasting with Kiss 92,9 Athens
92.1 MHz	ERT News Radio	15 September 2025	National; news and talk; first station of Greek state radio
92.3 MHz	Alfa & Omega 92.3	1990	Greek music; based in Ioannina with studio in Pamvotida
92.7 MHz	Radio Faros	1993	Religious station; rebroadcasting with Christianity of Athens
93.5 MHz	Hit Channel 93,5	2008	Greek pop and rock music (ex. Epirus Children Radio 9,35 FM)
94.0 MHz	Romeos FM	1987	Greek laïko, éntekhno, pop/rock music; located from Ioannina
94.2 MHz	Second Programme	11 May 1952	National; Greek music; second station of Greek state radio
94.5 MHz	Radio Epirus	1989	Greek music; based in Ioannina with studio in Petrovouni
94.9 MHz	Melody FM 94.9	1991	Greek music; rebroadcasting with Kidsradio.com 88.6 from Athens
95.4 MHz	Proto Kanali 95.4	1988	Foreign disco, electronic, pop and rock music; located from Ioannina
95.7 MHz	Star FM Ioannina	1982	Greek pop music; rebroadcasting with Mega News 104.6 of Athens
96.0 MHz	Spinos Radio 96	1990	Religious radio station; rebroadcasting with Peiraiki Ecclesia 91.2
96.7 MHz	Lampsi FM 96.7	2014	Greek pop music; rebroadcasting with Lampsi FM 92,3 Athens
97.2 MHz	Love Radio 97,2	2009	Greek and foreign music; rebroadcasting with Love of Athens
97.8 MHz	Third Programme	19 September 1954	National; classical music; third station of Greek state radio
98.4 MHz	Ioannina 9,84 FM	2012	News and talk; rebroadcasting with Focus FM 103,6
98.7 MHz	Ioannina 9,87 FM	1989	Ioannina municipal news, talk and culture radio station
99.2 MHz	Sky Radio 99,2 FM	1986	Greek music; rebroadcasting with Sfera FM 102,2 Athens
99.8 MHz	Second Programme	11 May 1952	National; Greek music; second station of Greek state radio
101.5 MHz	Energy FM 101.5	1999	Foreign pop and rock music (ex. Radio Adonis of Ioannina)
101.7 MHz	ERA Sport	3 May 1993	National; sports and talk; fourth station of Greek state radio
102.1 MHz	ERA Sport	3 May 1993	National; sports and talk; fourth station of Greek state radio
103.0 MHz	Studio E 1035	1991	Foreign rock music; rebroadcasting with Metropolis 95.5
103.3 MHz	ERT Ioannina	1949	News and talk; Local station of Greek state radio
104.3 MHz	Super Epirus	1989	Sports and talk; rebroadcasting with Sport FM Athens
104.7 MHz	Spirto FM 1047	2014	Greek and foreign music; rebroadcasting with Diesi 101,3
104.9 MHz	ERT News Radio	15 September 2025	National; news and talk; first station of Greek state radio
105.4 MHz	Giga FM Ioannina	1991	News and talk; rebroadcasting with Real FM 97,8
105.7 MHz	Pamvotida Epirus	1998	Greek traditional and skiladiko; located from Ioannina
106.1 MHz	ERT News Radio	15 September 2025	National; news and talk; first station of Greek state radio
106.7 MHz	Nitro FM 106.7	2014	Foreign music; rebroadcasting with 102.5 Radio of Athens
107.3 MHz	ERT News Radio	15 September 2025	National; news and talk; first station of Greek state radio
107.5 MHz	Rythmos Ioannina	2004	Greek music; rebroadcasting with Rythmos FM 94.9
107.7 MHz	Pindos FM 107,7	1998	Greek and foreign music; located from Metsovo
107.9 MHz	ERT Ioannina	1949	News and talk; Local station of Greek state radio

=== Prefecture of Preveza ===
Frequency	Name	On air since	Description
87.9 MHz	Preveza 87,9	1992	News and talk; rebroadcasting with Sport FM 94,6
90.8 MHz	ERT Ioannina	1949	News and talk; Local station of Greek state radio
91.6 MHz	Prisma FM 91,6	2012	News and talk; rebroadcasting with Skai 100.3
93.0 MHz	Radio Preveza 93	1987	News and talk; rebroadcasting with Real FM 97.8 Athens
93.4 MHz	Energy Preveza	2008	Foreign music (ex. Radio DeeJay, Energy & Radio Nicopolis)
94.2 MHz	Energy 94,2	1995	News and talk; rebroadcasting with Real FM 97.8 Athens
98.1 MHz	Radio Alfa	1987	Greek music; rebroadcasting with Melodia of Athens

=== Prefecture of Thesprotia ===
Frequency	Name	On air since	Description
89.0 MHz	Dryinoupolis	1990	Religious radio; rebroadcasting with Lydia FM 94.2
89.2 MHz	En Plo 89.2	1 August 2016	News, Greek and foreign music; rebroadcasts NG Radio
92.7 MHz	Radio Faros	1993	Religious station; rebroadcasting with Christianity of Athens
93.1 MHz	4U Radio 93.1	2010	Greek pop and rock music (ex. Ionian Radiowaves 9,33 FM)
93.5 MHz	Hit Channel 93,5	2008	Greek pop and rock music (ex. Epirus Children Radio 9,35)
94.5 MHz	Radio Epirus 94.5	1989	Greek music; based in Ioannina with studio in Petrovouni
97.1 MHz	Radio Thesprotia	1989	Greek and foreign music; relays of Easy 97.2 Athens
105.1 MHz	Orthodox Logos	1993	Religious radio; rebroadcasting with Ecclesia 89,5

== Radio stations in Macedonia ==
=== Prefecture of Chalkidiki ===
Frequency	Name	On air since	Description
87.8 MHz	Metropolis Chalkidiki	2013	Sports and talk; rebroadcasting with Metropolis 95,5 from Thessaloniki
90.8 MHz	Polygyros Radio	1982	Polygyros municipal news radio; rebroadcasts FM 100 of Thessaloniki
95.1 MHz	Cosmoradio Chalkidiki	1992	Greek music; relays of the namesake station from Thessaloniki
95.5 MHz	Radio Star 95,5 FM	1989	News and talk; rebroadcasting with Radio Thessaloniki 94.5
97.1 MHz	Radio Martyria	1996	Religious station; rebroadcasting with Ecclesia FM Athens
97.3 MHz	Laikos Chalkidiki	2014	Greek laïko; rebroadcasting with Laikos 87.6 of Thessaloniki
98.4 MHz	Radio Kassandra	1992	News, sports, talk and Greek music; located from Kassandreia
98.8 MHz	Radio Chalkidiki	1987	News and talk; rebroadcasting with Focus 103,6 of Thessaloniki
99.5 MHz	ZOO 99,5 fm	2022	Foreign music; rebroadcasting with ZOO Radio 90.8 Thessaloniki
102.6 MHz	Plus Radio 102.6	2012	Foreign pop music; relays of the namesake station from Thessaloniki

=== Prefecture of Drama ===
Frequency	Name	On air since	Description
88.4 MHz	Third Programme	19 September 1954	National; classical music; third station of Greek state radio
88.9 MHz	Energy Radio	1999	Foreign music; rebroadcasting with ZOO 90,8 Thessaloniki
89.8 MHz	Super FM Drama	1989	Foreign music; rebroadcasting with Athletic Metropolis
90.3 MHz	Psithiri Radio	2004	News and talk; rebroadcasting with Real FM 97.8
92.4 MHz	ERT News Radio	15 September 2025	National; news and talk; first station of Greek state radio
93.0 MHz	Blue 93 Drama	2025	Greek music; rebroadcasting with Blue 9,25 of Thessaloniki
93.5 MHz	Star 93.5 Stereo	1991	News and talk with Greek pop music; located from Drama
93.8 MHz	Pelekys FM 93.8	2022	News and talk; rebroadcasting with Athlitikos Libero
95.5 MHz	Alpha News 95.5	1999	News and talk; rebroadcasting with Skai 100.3
96.8 MHz	Rythmos Drama	2011	Greek music; rebroadcasting with Rythmos 94.9
97.1 MHz	Cosmos Drama	2024	Greek music; rebroadcasting with Cosmos Kavala
98.3 MHz	Dramini Ecclesia	1993	Religious radio; rebroadcasting with Peiraiki Ecclesia
99.1 MHz	Radio Drama 99,1	1987	Foreign music; rebroadcasting with Kiss FM 92.9 Athens
99.5 MHz	Second Programme	11 May 1952	National; Greek music; second station of Greek state radio
100.2 MHz	Kosmos 93.6	29 October 2001	Foreign world music; sixth station of Greek state radio
100.5 MHz	Melody FM	1999	Greek laïko and pop music; located from Drama
104.2 MHz	ERA Sport	3 May 1993	National; sports; fourth station of Greek state radio

=== Prefecture of Florina ===
Frequency	Name	On air since	Description
88.6 MHz	ERT News Radio	15 September 2025	National; news and talk; first station of Greek state radio
90.6 MHz	Second Programme	11 May 1952	National; Greek music; second station of Greek state radio
91.1 MHz	Second Programme	11 May 1952	National; Greek music; second station of Greek state radio
93.5 MHz	ERT News Radio	15 September 2025	National; news and talk; first station of Greek state radio
96.6 MHz	ERT Florina	1956	News and talk; Local station of Greek state radio
97.1 MHz	Radio Lechovo	1970	News and talk; located from Lechovo
98.3 MHz	Pnoi 98,3 Florina	2025	Religious radio; rebroadcasting with Ecclesia 89,5
102.8 MHz	True Story 102,8fm	2023	News and talk (ex. Vivagr 102.8 and Radio Fasma 103)
103.1 MHz	Third Programme	19 September 1954	National; classical music; third station of Greek state radio
104.0 MHz	Rythmos 104	2016	Greek pop and rock music (ex. Third Channel from Lechovo)
105.1 MHz	ERA Sport	3 May 1993	National; sports and talk; fourth station of Greek state radio

=== Prefecture of Grevena ===
Frequency	Name	On air since	Description
93.3 MHz	Star FM	1997	News and talk; rebroadcasting with Skai 100.3 from Athens
94.0 MHz	ANT1 Grevena	1993	Greek and foreign music; rebroadcasting with Easy 97,2
97.4 MHz	ERA Sport	3 May 1993	National; sports and talk; fourth station of Greek state radio
99.4 MHz	ERT News Radio	15 September 2025	National; news and talk; first station of Greek state radio
101.5 MHz	Grevena FM	1989	News and talk; rebroadcasting with Status FM Thessaloniki
104.7 MHz	Radio Deskati	1998	Greek traditional and skiladiko; located from Deskati

=== Prefecture of Imathia ===
Frequency	Name	On air since	Description
88.3 MHz	NRG / Energy	2003	Greek and foreign music (ex. Radio Enodia 88,3)
90.2 MHz	Pavleios Logos	2005	Religious station; rebroadcasting with Ecclesia 89.5
90.6 MHz	Asteras FM 90.6	1992	Greek traditional and laïko music; located from Meliki
93.1 MHz	Akroama FM 93.1	1999	Greek laïko, pop and rock music; located from Platy
97.3 MHz	Radio Imathia 97.3	25 August 1988	News, talk and Greek music; located from Veria
97.7 MHz	Avena Radio 97,7	2014	News and talk; rebroadcasting with Sport FM 94,6
99.6 MHz	Akou 99.6 Veria	2017	News and talk; rebroadcasting with Athens 98.4 FM
102.8 MHz	Aixmi Radio	1989	News and talk; rebroadcasting with Skai 100.3 Attica

=== Prefecture of Kastoria ===
Frequency	Name	On air since	Description
91.5 MHz	Kastoria FM 91.5	1989	News and talk; rebroadcasting with Metropolis FM Thessaloniki
92.0 MHz	Erotas Radio 92	1997	Greek and foreign music; rebroadcasting with Love Radio 97,5
93.0 MHz	Radio Kastoria	27 April 1989	News and talk; rebroadcasting with 105.5 sto Kokkino Athens
93.6 MHz	Antennes FM	7 November 1995	News and talk with foreign pop music; located from Kastoria
94.7 MHz	Alpha FM 94.7	2003	News and talk; rebroadcasting with Alpha 98.9 of Athens
97.9 MHz	Agios Grigorios	1984	Religious radio; rebroadcasting with Peiraiki Ecclesia
99.2 MHz	Astra FM 99.2	1995	Greek pop and rock music; located from Kastoria
99.9 MHz	C FM 99.9	2017	Foreign music (ex. Sfera 95.1 and Star Sports 90.1)

=== Prefecture of Kavala ===
Frequency	Name	On air since	Description
88.3 MHz	Orange Radio	2022	Greek and foreign music; rebroadcasting with Melodia 99,2fm
88.6 MHz	Alpha FM 88,6	1987	News and talk; rebroadcasting with Skai 100.3 from Athens
89.2 MHz	ERT News Radio	15 September 2025	National; news and talk; first station of Greek state radio
90.5 MHz	ENA Radio Kavala	1989	News and talk; rebroadcasting with Real FM 97,8 Athens
90.8 MHz	Radio Neapolis 90,8	1999	News, talk, entertainment and culture; located from Kavala
91.7 MHz	Kanali 5 Love Radio	1989	News and talk; rebroadcasting with Love Radio 97.5 Athens
92.2 MHz	Space Radio 9,22	1994	News and talk; rebroadcasting with Libero FM Thessaloniki
93.2 MHz	Cosmos FM	2015	Greek pop and rock music (ex. Sfera FM & Kavala 93,1)
93.7 MHz	Proini FM 9,37	1988	News and talk with Greek music; located from Kavala
94.4 MHz	Seven News	2017	News and talk with Greek music (ex. Star FM, Stop FM)
94.8 MHz	Now Radio 94.8	2010	Foreign pop music (ex. Erotas Radio, Erotikos, Super FM)
95.1 MHz	ERT News Radio	15 September 2025	National; news and talk; first station of Greek state radio
96.3 MHz	ERT Kavalas 96,3	1949	News and talk; Local station of Greek state radio
96.6 MHz	Radio Energy 96.6	2000	Greek music (ex. Underground FM 92.2)
97.0 MHz	Radio Kavala 97fm	1990	Kavala municipal news, talk and culture radio station
97.8 MHz	Metropolis Radio	2014	Sports and talk; rebroadcasting with Metropolis 95.5 FM
98.9 MHz	Stoxos Radio	1990	News and talk with Greek laïko music; located from Thasos
100.8 MHz	Third Programme	19 September 1954	National; classical music; third station of Greek state radio
101.3 MHz	Lelevose Pontos FM	2008	Pontic Greeks traditional music (ex. Echo Radio 101.3)
101.8 MHz	Lobby FM 101.8	2002	News and talk; rebroadcasting with Parapolitika 90.1
102.8 MHz	Kavala News	2021	News and talk; rebroadcasting with Radio Thessaloniki
103.2 MHz	Palmos FM	2013	Greek laïko music (ex. Rasopoulon Pontos & Makedonia)
103.7 MHz	Parousia	1994	Religious radio; rebroadcasting with Ecclesia Radio Athens
104.7 MHz	ERA Sport	3 May 1993	National; sports and talk; fourth station of Greek state radio
105.3 MHz	Lydia Philippisia	1994	Religious radio; rebroadcasting with Lydia FM Thessaloniki
105.7 MHz	Lampsi FM Kavala	1995	Greek éntekhno-laïko, pop-rock music; located from Kavala
106.4 MHz	Makedonissa 106,4	1991	Greek éntekhno-laïko, pop-rock music; located from Kavala
106.7 MHz	Second Programme	11 May 1952	National; Greek music; second station of Greek state radio
107.0 MHz	Capital FM Kavala	2011	Foreign pop and rock music (ex. Radio SOS – TEI Kavala)

=== Prefecture of Kilkis ===
Frequency	Name	On air since	Description
88.8 MHz	Ecclesia FM	1994	Religious radio; rebroadcasting with Ecclesia 89,5
98.7 MHz	Synora FM	1992	News and talk; rebroadcasting with Skai 100.3
102.8 MHz	Epiloges	1990	News and talk; located from Polykastro

=== Prefecture of Kozani ===
Frequency	Name	On air since	Description
89.5 MHz	NRG Radio 89,5	1993	Foreign pop and rock music; located from Kozani
91.6 MHz	Diva FM 91.6	1992	Foreign music; rebroadcasting with 102.5 Athens
91.9 MHz	Kapsoura	2018	Pirate radio with Greek laïko and rebetiko music
92.6 MHz	Power 92.6	2011	Greek pop and rock music (ex. Radio Galatini)
92.9 MHz	Fresh Radio	2009	Greek and foreign pop music (ex. Crack FM 9,29)
93.3 MHz	Blue FM 93.3	2015	Greek music; rebroadcasting Blue 92.5 Thessaloniki
95.1 MHz	Top FM 95.1	1992	Greek laïko, pop and rock music; located from Kozani
95.3 MHz	Vivafm 953	8 March 1999	Foreign pop and rock music; located from Ptolemaida
95.7 MHz	Siatista FM	1990	News-talk, entertainment-culture; located from Siatista
98.0 MHz	West Radio	1988	News & talk; rebroadcasting with Real FM 97,8 Athens
99.0 MHz	Free 99 FM	1988	News and talk; rebroadcasting with Radio Thessaloniki
99.5 MHz	Stathmos	2018	Greek pop and rock music (ex. Eroticos, Music Ideas)
99.7 MHz	Sky FM	1989	News and talk; rebroadcasting with Metropolis 95.5
100.2 MHz	ERT Kozani	1950	News and talk; Local station of Greek state radio
102.4 MHz	Melodia FM 102.4	1991	Greek pop and rock music; located from Ptolemaida
102.8 MHz	True Story Ptolemaida	2023	News and talk (ex. Vivagr 102.8 & Radio Fasma 103 FM)
103.0 MHz	Orthodoxy and Tradition	11 August 1989	Orthodox religious church radio station; located from Siatista
103.6 MHz	Second Programme	11 May 1952	National; Greek music; second station of Greek state radio
103.7 MHz	Golden Radio	2012	Greek and foreign music (ex. Ptolemaida's Children)
104.4 MHz	Rythmos FM	2008	Relays of the namesake radio station from Florina
105.3 MHz	Siera 105,3	7 September 1991	Greek music; rebroadcasting with Sfera 102,2 of Athens
105.6 MHz	ERA Sport	3 May 1993	National; sports and talk; fourth station of Greek state radio
106.3 MHz	Laikos Kozani	2019	Greek laïko music; rebroadcasting with Laikos 105,7 Larissa
106.6 MHz	Radio Meli 106.6	2008	Rebroadcasting with Athlitikos Libero and NG Radio Athens

=== Prefecture of Pella ===
Frequency	Name	On air since	Description
96.3 MHz	Toxotis 96,3	29 September 1991	News and talk; located from Giannitsa
97.1 MHz	Radio Alitis	2026	Greek laïko music (ex. Radio Almopia 94,8)
103.3 MHz	Pella FM	1991	Rebroadcasting with Skai 100.3 and NG Radio
106.3 MHz	Life Radio	2009	Greek music (ex. SuperSonic-North Sound)
106.7 MHz	Aridaia FM	1992	Greek pop music; located from Aridaia

=== Prefecture of Pieria ===
Frequency	Name	On air since	Description
88.3 MHz	Viva FM 88,3	2004	Greek and foreign pop music (ex. Radio 1)
89.2 MHz	Dionysus FM	1977	Greek pop and rock music; located from Vrontou
90.2 MHz	Power FM 90,2	1998	Greek and foreign pop music; located from Katerini
92.2 MHz	Radio Enimerosi	2004	News and culture; rebroadcasting with Alpha Radio
93.0 MHz	Skai 93fm Pieria	2002	News and culture; rebroadcasting with Skai 100.3
95.3 MHz	Radio Katerini	1987	News and talk; Katerini's municipal radio station
96.3 MHz	Forever FM	2005	Foreign pop and rock music (ex. Radio Katerini)
97.7 MHz	Capital FM	2007	Greek music; rebroadcasting with Sport FM 94,6
100.8 MHz	Panorama	1992	Greek pop and rock music; located from Kato Milia
101.5 MHz	Olympus FM	1988	News & talk with Greek music; located from Katerini
102.8 MHz	City FM 102.8	1991	Foreign pop & rock music; located from Ganochora
103.4 MHz	Radio Manos	1992	Greek pop & rock music; located from Nea Efesos
103.8 MHz	Cosmos FM	2004	Greek and foreign pop music (ex. Heat Radio)
104.2 MHz	Radio Pieria	1992	Greek traditional and laïko; located from Lofos
106.3 MHz	Radio Alexandros	1995	Greek pop and rock music; located from Katerini
106.7 MHz	Rythmos Makedonia	2025	Greek music (ex. Metropolis, Athlitikos FM, Safari)
108.0 MHz	Radio Makedonia	1976	Greek music

=== Prefecture of Serres ===
Frequency	Name	On air since	Description
87.6 MHz	ERA Sport	3 May 1993	National; sports and talk; fourth station of Greek state radio
88.8 MHz	Lemon 88.8 FM	2020	Greek and foreign music; rebroadcasting with Sfera Athens
89.6 MHz	Second Programme	11 May 1952	National; Greek music; second station of Greek state radio
91.7 MHz	Mega FM 91.7 Stereo	1992	Sports & talk with Greek pop music; located from Serres
92.1 MHz	Galaxy Radio Serres	2024	Greek éntekhno and laïko music (ex. Sintiki Radio 92.1)
92.6 MHz	Mousikos Galaxias	1992	Greek laïko and rebetiko music; located from Strymonas
93.0 MHz	Cosmos Radio	2012	News and talk; rebroadcasting with Radio Thessaloniki
93.5 MHz	Noize Radio	2004	Greek and foreign music (ex. Radio Makedonia 935)
94.6 MHz	Akroama	1992	Greek pop and rock music; located from Lefkonas
95.0 MHz	Rodon FM	1994	Foreign music; rebroadcasting with Best FM 92,6
96.0 MHz	Radio Alfa 96	1993	Foreign pop and rock music; located from Serres
96.4 MHz	ERT News Radio	15 September 2025	National; news and talk; first station of Greek state radio
96.7 MHz	Radio Alfa GR 96,7	1999	Greek éntekhno-laïko-pop-rock music; located from Serres
97.2 MHz	Metropolis FM Serres	2006	Sports and talk; rebroadcasting with Metropolis Thessaloniki
97.8 MHz	Radio Epikairotita 97,8	1992	News and talk; rebroadcasting with We 89.4 Thessaloniki
98.2 MHz	Rythmos 9.82 Serres	2026	Greek laïko, pop and rock music (ex. Radio Fyllida 9.82)
98.9 MHz	Radio Serres 9,89	1988	News/talk with Greek laïko and pop; located from Serres
99.2 MHz	Kivotos FM 99.2	2003	Religious radio; rebroadcasting with Ecclesia Radio Athens
100.0 MHz	Polis FM 100	2006	Greek pop and rock music (ex. Serres Radio Palmos FM100)
101.0 MHz	101 Radio 1	1986	Foreign electronic and alternative rock; located from Serres
101.5 MHz	ERT Serres	1959	News, talk and culture; Local station of Greek state radio
102.4 MHz	Sokolata FM	3 November 2018	Greek pop and rock music (ex. Diktyo FM & Echo FM)
102.7 MHz	Master Serres	1996	Greek laïko – rebetiko music; located from Irakleia
103.0 MHz	Radio E 103 FM	1988	News and talk; rebroadcasting with Skai 100.3
104.2 MHz	American Radio	1994	Greek and foreign pop music; located from Serres
104.8 MHz	Capital Serres	2022	Foreign music; rebroadcasting with Capital 107 Kavala
105.1 MHz	Ecclesia 89.5	19 February 1989	National; Orthodox radio station by the Church of Greece
105.5 MHz	Epiloges FM	1989	News and talk; rebroadcasting with Real FM 97,8 of Athens
105.8 MHz	Third Programme	19 September 1954	National; classical music; third station of Greek state radio
106.0 MHz	Notes 106 FM Serres	1999	Greek laïko, pop and rock music; located from Serres

== Radio stations in Thessaly ==
=== Prefecture of Karditsa ===
Frequency	Name	On air since	Description
92.5 MHz	Agios Damianos	1996	Religious radio; rebroadcasting with Ecclesia 89.5
99.0 MHz	Radio Proto 99	22 February 1988	Greek pop music; located from Mouzaki
99.5 MHz	Cosmos 99,5	1988	Greek traditional music; located from Drakotrypa
100.8 MHz	Ixorama 100.8	1988	News and talk; rebroadcasting with Ixorama 106.6 Larissa
102.8 MHz	Angel FM 102.8	2013	Greek pop and rock music (ex. Diavlos FM 102.8)
104.2 MHz	Palmos FM 104.2	1988	News and talk; located from Karditsa

=== Prefecture of Larissa ===
Frequency	Name	On air since	Description
87.8 MHz	Kivotos Radio	1998	Greek music; rebroadcasting with Melodia 99,2 Athens
88.4 MHz	Elassona Radio	17 November 1989	News and talk; rebroadcasting with Sport FM 94,6 Athens
88.8 MHz	Loud Radio 88.8	25 June 2002	Foreign pop music; rebroadcasting with 95.2 Athens DeeJay
89.0 MHz	Cocktail Radio	2015	Foreign music (ex. Education, Information, Entertainment Radio)
89.2 MHz	Rythmos Trikala	2013	Greek pop and rock music; rebroadcasting with Rythmos Athens
89.8 MHz	Stork FM 89,8	1988	Greek hip hop, laïko, pop and rock music; located from Farsala
90.1 MHz	Pressing 90,1fm	2019	Sports and talk (ex. Sport News, Sport FM and Super Radio)
90.5 MHz	905 Rock Larissa	2025	Rock music; rebroadcasting with 1055 Rock of Thessaloniki
91.0 MHz	NRG 91 Larissa	1 October 2016	Foreign pop and rock music (ex. Hxos – formerly on 90,9)
91.4 MHz	Palace Radio	2002	News and talk; rebroadcasting with Skai 100.3 of Athens
92.0 MHz	Anemos 92	2002	Greek laïko and rebetiko music (ex. Music Channel 1)
92.2 MHz	Glenti FM	2023	Greek traditional music (ex. Heat FM & Radio Velika)
93.2 MHz	Power 932	2008	Foreign pop and rock music (ex. Thessalian Radio)
93.6 MHz	Larissa FM	1989	News and talk; Larissa municipal radio station
93.9 MHz	Zimia Radio	2020	Greek laïko music (ex. Best Radio and Flash 93.1)
94.2 MHz	Metro Radio	2020	Greek and foreign pop music (ex. Entasi & Radio Agia)
95.1 MHz	Radio TRT	29 October 1995	News, talk and music; rebroadcasting with Real FM 97,8
95.4 MHz	Vibe 9.54	2009	Foreign pop music; rebroadcasting with Best Radio 92.6
95.7 MHz	DeeJay	2012	Foreign music; rebroadcasting with 95.2 Athens DeeJay
96.0 MHz	Thessalia	1993	News-talk and Greek pop music; located from Karditsa
96.3 MHz	Ecclesia 96.3	1993	Religious station; rebroadcasting with Ecclesia 89.5
97.1 MHz	Party Elassona	2009	Greek and foreign music (ex. Radio 2, Steve FM)
97.6 MHz	Radio Club 97,6	1987	News-talk-Greek music; located from Trikala
97.8 MHz	Campos Radio	2023	News-talk-Greek music (ex. Radio Kissavos)
98.3 MHz	ERT Larissa	1948	News and talk; Local station of Greek state radio
98.8 MHz	Rythmos	2004	Greek pop music; rebroadcasting with Rythmos 9,49
99.4 MHz	Polis Radio	1995	Greek pop and rock music (ex. City Radio Larissa)
99.5 MHz	Cosmos 99,5	1988	Greek traditional music; located from Drakotrypa
100.0 MHz	Zygos FM 100	1988	News and talk; rebroadcasting with Parapolitika 90,1
100.4 MHz	Kiss 100,4 fm	2007	Foreign music; rebroadcasting with Kiss FM 92.9 Athens
101.6 MHz	Sfaira 101,6	2012	Greek music (ex. Larissa Radio DeeJay and Enallax 101,8)
102.2 MHz	Scanner FM	1989	Greek and foreign pop/rock music; located from Ampelonas
103.5 MHz	Radio Trikala	1989	Greek laïko, rebetiko and skiladiko; located from Trikala
103.8 MHz	Radio Tyrnavos	1989	Greek laïko, rebetiko and skiladiko; located from Tyrnavos
104.3 MHz	Radio 69 104,4	1999	Greek laïko, rebetiko and skiladiko; located from Larissa
105.3 MHz	Easy fm 105,3	2020	Foreign music; rebroadcasting with Easy 97.2 from Athens
105.7 MHz	Laikos 105,7	2012	Greek laïko and rebetiko music (ex. Enjoy FM 105,7)
106.2 MHz	Oichalia FM	1997	Religious radio; rebroadcasting with Christianity Athens
106.6 MHz	Ixorama 106.6	2024	Greek music (ex. Paradosiakos, River 105.3, Power 108)
107.3 MHz	Mousiko Kanali	1 January 1989	Greek pop and rock music; located from Elassona
107.6 MHz	Avanti 107.6	1995	Foreign pop music; located from Larissa

=== Prefecture of Magnesia ===
Frequency	Name	On air since	Description
87.5 MHz	Monastic Diakonia	1997	Orthodox religious station from Agios Georgios Nileias
88.2 MHz	Chroma Magnesia	2016	Greek and foreign music; rebroadcasting with Chroma 105.8
88.6 MHz	Lampsi FM 88.6	2004	Greek pop music; rebroadcasting with Lampsi 92,3 from Athens
89.5 MHz	Sport FM 89.5	2010	Sports and talk; rebroadcasting with Sport FM 94,6 from Athens
90.7 MHz	Sfaira Magnesia	2012	Greek music; rebroadcasting with Sfaira FM 101,6 from Larissa
91.8 MHz	Radio Vera Volos	19 April 1989	News, talk with Greek pop and rock music; located from Volos
92.8 MHz	ERT News Radio	15 September 2025	National; news and talk; first station of Greek state radio
93.1 MHz	Radio Pilio 93.1	1997	Greek laïko, skiladiko and rebetiko music; located from Volos
94.5 MHz	Zimia Radio 94.5	2022	Greek laïko music; rebroadcasting with Zimia FM Larissa
94.8 MHz	Second Programme	11 May 1952	National; Greek music; second station of Greek state radio
95.3 MHz	Star FM 95.3 Stereo	1993	Foreign electronic, disco, pop/rock music; located from Volos
96.1 MHz	Marconi Radio 9.61	1999	News and talk; rebroadcasting with Alpha Radio 989 Athens
96.8 MHz	Third Programme	19 September 1954	National; classical music; third station of Greek state radio
97.3 MHz	Astra FM Stereo	2003	News, talk and Greek music; rebroadcasting with Sfera 102,2 (ex. Radio Irma 97,3)
98.0 MHz	Magnesia Kiss	2008	Foreign pop and rock music; rebroadcasting with Kiss FM 92,9
98.3 MHz	Avanti Radio	1993	Greek and foreign pop and rock music; located from Skiathos
98.6 MHz	Volos 98.6	1989	News, sports and talk; rebroadcasting with Athens 98.4 FM
99.8 MHz	FORMedia	2022	News, sports and talk; rebroadcasting with Real Athens
100.2 MHz	Power FM	1994	Foreign pop and rock music; located from Volos
100.7 MHz	ERT Volos	1948	News and talk; Local station of Greek state radio
101.2 MHz	ERT Volos	1948	News and talk; Local station of Greek state radio
102.4 MHz	Skopelos	1989	Amateur radio with Greek music; located from Skopelos
102.5 MHz	Radio 1	1989	News and talk; rebroadcasting with Kidsradio.com 88.6 FM
103.0 MHz	Radio Deilina	2022	Greek laïko music (ex. Alfa Laikos, Alfa Skai, Alfa Radio)
103.3 MHz	New Radio 103,3	2024	News and talk (ex. Perfect Radio, Super FM 103.3)
104.0 MHz	Orthodoxi Martyria	1992	Religious radio; rebroadcasting with Ecclesia FM 89,5
104.5 MHz	Volos DeeJay 104,5	2015	Foreign music; rebroadcasting with 95.2 Athens DeeJay
105.1 MHz	Blue Heart FM 105.1	2016	Sports and talk; rebroadcasting with Metropolis 9,55fm
106.0 MHz	Nova 106 fm Volos	1993	Foreign music (ex. NovaSport Magnesia, Argo FM)
106.4 MHz	Top FM Stereo	1993	Greek and foreign pop music; located from Volos
107.1 MHz	ERA Sport	3 May 1993	National; sports and talk; fourth station of Greek state radio

=== Prefecture of Trikala ===
Frequency	Name	On air since	Description
87.6 MHz	Radio Stagon 87,6	1989	News and talk; rebroadcasting with Skai 100.3 Athens
88.0 MHz	Laikos FM Trikala	2020	Greek laïko; rebroadcasting with Laikos 105,7 of Larissa
88.8 MHz	Loud Radio 88.8	25 June 2002	Foreign pop music; rebroadcasting with 95.2 Athens DeeJay
89.2 MHz	Rythmos Trikala	2013	Greek pop and rock music; rebroadcasting with Rythmos 9,49
90.3 MHz	Meteora FM 90.3	1989	News and Greek music; rebroadcasting with Real 97,8 Athens
92.0 MHz	Anemos Thessalia	2002	Greek laïko and rebetiko music (ex. Trikala Music Channel 1)
95.5 MHz	Stournaraiika FM	2009	Amateur radio station with Greek laïko and rebetiko music
97.6 MHz	Radio Club 97,6	1987	News and talk with Greek music; located from Trikala
100.0 MHz	Zygos FM Trikala	1988	News and talk; rebroadcasting with Parapolitika FM
102.0 MHz	Agios Oikoumenios	1993	Religious radio; rebroadcasting with Ecclesia 89,5
103.5 MHz	Radio Trikala 103.5	1989	Greek laïko and rebetiko music; located from Trikala
105.3 MHz	Easy FM Thessalia	2020	Foreign music; rebroadcasting with Easy 97.2 Athens
106.8 MHz	Melodia FM 106.8	2014	Greek pop and rock music (ex. Life FM 106.8 Trikala)

== Radio stations in Thrace ==
=== Prefecture of Evros ===
Frequency	Name	On air since	Description
87.5 MHz	Thraki Radio 99.8	1996	News and talk; rebroadcasting with Athens 98.4 FM
88.1 MHz	Third Programme	19 September 1954	Classical music, opera; third station of Greek state radio
88.3 MHz	Heat Radio 88.3	14 February 1995	Foreign pop and rock music; located from Alexandroupolis
88.9 MHz	Focus FM Evros	2015	News and talk with Greek music (ex. Ellinikos 88,9 Evros)
89.2 MHz	ERT News Radio	15 September 2025	National; news and talk; first station of Greek state radio
89.4 MHz	ERA Sport	3 May 1993	National; sports and talk; fourth station of Greek state radio
89.8 MHz	ERT News Radio	15 September 2025	National; news and talk; first station of Greek state radio
90.7 MHz	Second Programme	11 May 1952	National; Greek music; second station of Greek state radio
90.8 MHz	Apostolos Andreas	1999	Religious radio; rebroadcasting with Ecclesia 89.5 of Athens
91.8 MHz	Second Programme	11 May 1952	National; Greek music; second station of Greek state radio
92.4 MHz	Maximum Radio	1995	News and talk; rebroadcasting with Real FM 97,8 Athens
92.9 MHz	Sferikos FM	2004	News and talk; rebroadcasting with Parapolitika Radio
93.6 MHz	Maximum Radio	1995	News and talk; rebroadcasting with Real FM 97,8 Athens
93.8 MHz	Second Programme	11 May 1952	National; Greek music; second station of Greek state radio
94.2 MHz	Status Radio 94,2	2008	News and talk; rebroadcasting with Radio Thessaloniki 94,5
94.8 MHz	DeeJay FM Evros	2003	Foreign pop music; rebroadcasting with 95,2 Athens DeeJay
95.3 MHz	Radio Evros 97,1	1989	News and talk; rebroadcasting with Sport FM 94,6 of Athens
95.7 MHz	You FM Evros	2022	Foreign pop music (ex. Ola Laika FM and Ellada FM 98,7)
96.0 MHz	Ellada FM	2025	News and talk; rebroadcasting with 105.5 sto Kokkino
96.1 MHz	Radio Elpida	2016	Religious radio; rebroadcasting with Ecclesia Radio 89.5
96.6 MHz	Apps FM Evros	2018	News and talk; rebroadcasting with Easy 97,2 from Athens
97.1 MHz	Radio Evros 97,1	1989	News and talk; rebroadcasting with Sport FM 94,6 of Athens
97.3 MHz	Kanali (Channel) 5	1988	Greek and foreign pop/ballads; located from Alexandroupolis
97.8 MHz	Metro Radio 97,8	2015	Foreign pop music (ex. Noise Radio, Sfaira FM & NRG 92.6)
98.1 MHz	ERT Komotini	1954	News and talk with culture; Local station of Greek state radio
98.5 MHz	NRG Radio	2013	Greek music (ex. Thea 98.6, Ixorama 102.6, Klik FM 105.8)
98.6 MHz	NRG Radio	2013	Greek music (ex. Thea 98.6, Ixorama 102.6, Klik FM 105.8)
98.7 MHz	You FM Evros	2022	Foreign pop music (ex. Ola Laika FM and Ellada FM 98,7)
98.9 MHz	ERT News Radio	15 September 2025	National; news and talk; first station of Greek state radio
99.3 MHz	Sferikos FM	2004	News and talk; rebroadcasting with Parapolitika Radio
99.8 MHz	Thraki Radio 99.8	1996	News and talk; rebroadcasting with Athens 98.4 FM
100.4 MHz	Eurosky FM	1992	Greek laïko, pop and rock music; located from Fylakio
101.0 MHz	ERT Orestiada	1965	News, talk and culture; Local station of Greek state radio
101.4 MHz	Yparxo FM	2008	Greek laïko and rebetiko (ex. Star FM 101,4 Alexandroupolis)
101.5 MHz	Orestiada 1015	1989	Orestiada municipal news/talk radio; Athens 98.4 FM relays
101.8 MHz	Sky FM Orestiada	1988	Greek laïko, pop and rock music; located from Fylakio
102.0 MHz	Sky FM Orestiada	1988	Greek laïko, pop and rock music; located from Fylakio
102.3 MHz	Delta FM Stereo	1991	News and talk; rebroadcasting with Skai 100.3 Athens
102.6 MHz	Polis FM 102.6	2006	Greek music; rebroadcasting with Rythmos 949 Athens
103.5 MHz	ERT Orestiada	1965	News, talk and culture; Local station of Greek state radio
104.0 MHz	Ellada FM	2025	News and talk; rebroadcasting with 105.5 sto Kokkino
104.3 MHz	Alfa FM Evros	1995	News and talk; rebroadcasting with Alpha 9.89
105.8 MHz	Alexios Komninos	1995	Pontic Greeks music; located from Alexandroupolis
106.0 MHz	Delta FM Stereo	1991	News and talk; rebroadcasting with Skai 100.3 Athens
106.3 MHz	Polis FM 102.6	2006	Greek music; rebroadcasting with Rythmos 949 Athens
107.0 MHz	MAD FM 107	2012	Foreign music; rebroadcasting with Mad Radio of Athens
107.3 MHz	ERA Sport	3 May 1993	National; sports and talk; fourth station of Greek state radio

=== Prefecture of Rodopi ===
Frequency	Name	On air since	Description
87.5 MHz	Xronos (Time FM)	1999	News and talk; rebroadcasting with Alpha 98.9
89.5 MHz	My FM Komotini	2013	Foreign music (ex. Komotini DeeJay & Ecstasy FM)
91.2 MHz	ERT Komotini	1954	News, talk and music; Local station of Greek state radio
91.8 MHz	Çınar FM 91.8	30 April 2010	Turkish speaking culture station (ex. Işık FM / Light FM)
92.4 MHz	Diavlos Rodopi	1989	News and talk; rebroadcasting with Sfera 102,2 Athens
94.0 MHz	Radio Paratiritis	1998	News and talk; rebroadcasting with Kidsradio.com 88.6
95.5 MHz	Radio Rodopi 9,55	1993	News and talk; rebroadcasting with Sport FM 94,6 of Athens
95.8 MHz	Orthodox Messages	1990	Religious radio; rebroadcasting with Ecclesia FM 89,5 Athens
103.1 MHz	Rythmos FM 103,1	2007	News and talk; rebroadcasting with Rythmos 9,49 of Athens
104.5 MHz	Radio Xilagani	1990	Greek laïko and rebetiko music; located from Komotini
106.9 MHz	Joy 106.9	29 August 1994	Turkish speaking radio station; located from Komotini
107.6 MHz	Radio City	20 April 1992	Turkish speaking radio station; located from Komotini

=== Prefecture of Xanthi ===
Frequency	Name	On air since	Description
88.0 MHz	Super 88 Radio	1990	News and talk; rebroadcasting with Real 97,8 of Athens
88.8 MHz	Star FM 88.8	1 January 2018	News, talk, culture and Greek music (ex. Radio Arvila)
89.9 MHz	Omorfi Poli	1994	Xanthi municipal news, talk and culture radio station
90.3 MHz	Paradise FM	1997	Foreign music; rebroadcasting with Galaxy 92 Athens
92.1 MHz	Life Radio 92.1	1994	News-talk, culture and Greek music; located from Xanthi
93.1 MHz	Nova Radio 93,1	2004	News and talk; rebroadcasting with Sfera 102,2 of Athens
93.5 MHz	Radio Xanthi 93.5	1988	News-talk, culture and Greek music; located from Xanthi
93.8 MHz	Diakonia FM 93.8	1995	Religious station; rebroadcasting with Ecclesia Athens
94.6 MHz	Xanthi DeeJay	2016	Foreign music; rebroadcasting with 95.2 Athens DeeJay
96.9 MHz	Dream FM Xanthi	2024	Foreign electronica music (ex. Top FM, Democritus Radio)
98.4 MHz	Velvet Xanthi	2016	Foreign music; rebroadcasting with Velvet 968 Thessaloniki
98.8 MHz	ERT News Radio	15 September 2025	National; news and talk; first station of Greek state radio
100.0 MHz	Kral (King) 100	2016	Turkish speaking station; rebroadcasting with Alpha 98.9 fm
101.1 MHz	Glenti 101,1	2008	Greek laïko and rebetiko music (ex. Radio Coral 101)
101.1 MHz	ERT News Radio	15 September 2025	National; news and talk; first station of Greek state radio
101.4 MHz	ERA Sport	3 May 1993	Sports and talk; fourth station of Greek state radio
101.6 MHz	Legend FM 101,6	2008	Foreign rock music (ex. Omega Radio)
103.0 MHz	Erotikos 103 Xanthi	2024	Greek music (ex. Paradosiakos Lepeniotis)
105.1 MHz	Goal 105.1 Xanthi	2013	Sports; rebroadcasting with Metropolis FM 95.5
105.5 MHz	Sugar FM 105,5	2024	News/talk; rebroadcasting with Radio Thessaloniki
105.6 MHz	ERA Sport	3 May 1993	Sports and talk; fourth station of Greek state radio
105.7 MHz	Melodikos 105.7	1993	Greek and foreign music; located from Xanthi
106.0 MHz	Rythmos 106 FM	2006	Greek pop music (ex. Star FM 106.7)

== Medium Wave (MW band) ==
On the AM band, there are few licensed stations left, all of which are state-run. Unlicensed broadcasting is tolerated as the majority of listeners have abandoned the MW band. A number of unlicensed radio stations have taken advantage of that, thus avoiding the "crowded" FM band. A number of pirate radio enthusiasts use the expanded upper part of the AM band (1600–1710 kHz) for "experimental" transmissions. When MW pirate radio broadcasting occurred, there was a formal division between the AM and FM, in Athens and Thessaloniki. On the MW/AM band most radio pirates in Athens were broadcasting foreign music (pop and rock) whereas in FM most radio pirates broadcast Greek popular music. In Thessaloniki, and most of the rest of Greece, on MW/AM pirates were playing Greek popular music, and foreign pop and rock on FM. Currently, with several exceptions, nearly all MW/AM radio pirates play Greek popular music to a limited audience.

=== In Athens ===
All the state-run radio stations still broadcast their programs on the MW band, except the Third Programme which gave its frequency (666 kHz) to an ERA Filia (Friendship) which has been suspended since 2013. The program is shared with another state station Kosmos. Since unlicensed broadcasting on the AM in Greece is illegal but tolerated, some pirate radio stations broadcast full-fledged radio programs, some with commercials and some experimental. An example is on 1098 kHz, broadcasting experimentally in C-QUAM, AM Stereo, one of the few AM Stereo radio stations in Europe. Other unlicensed radio stations on the MW include those on 909 kHz, 1017 kHz, 1035 kHz and 1188 kHz.

Frequency	Name	On air since	Description
522 kHz	Radio Gold 105	1965	Amateur station with foreign pop and rock music
540 kHz	Electric Rock	1976	Amateur station with foreign pop and rock music
558 kHz	Studio 344	1976	Amateur station with foreign pop and rock music
585 kHz	Zavoliaris Radio	1985	Amateur station with Greek laïko music
665 kHz	Third Programme	19 September 1954	Classical music; third station of Greek state radio
684 kHz	Studio A1000	1978	Amateur station with Greek laïko and rebetiko
702 kHz	Radio Blackman	1980	Greek music (formerly on 103.1, 103.2, 103.3, 104.9)
729 kHz	ERT News Radio	15 September 2025	National; news and talk; first station of Greek state radio
747 kHz	Radio Goldies 2	1965	Amateur station with foreign pop and rock music
774 kHz	Electric Radio	1976	Amateur station with Greek laïko music
801 kHz	Studio 1	1985	Amateur station with Greek laïko music
819 kHz	Kostas Laser	1983	Amateur station with Greek laïko music
828 kHz	Radio Astrikos	1990	Amateur station with Greek pop and rock music
846 kHz	Cannibal Radio	2011	Amateur station with Greek laïko music
864 kHz	78–45	1983	Amateur station with Greek laïko music
882 kHz	HB (Fanis Kaisariani)	1990	Amateur station with Greek laïko music
891 kHz	Vips Radio	1975	Amateur station with Greek laïko music
891 kHz	Stavros Mega Planet Piraeus	1975	Amateur station with Greek pop and rock music
909 kHz	Psiloritis FM	1985	Amateur station with traditional music of Crete
918 kHz	Radio Emerson	1975	Amateur station with foreign pop and rock music
927 kHz	Black and White Radio Piraeus	2012	Amateur station with Greek pop and rock music
936 kHz	Mousikos Episkeptis A 300 Galatsi	1981	Amateur station with Greek pop and rock music
945 kHz	Radio Gemini	1983	Amateur station with Greek pop and rock music
954 kHz	Oscar Music	2023	Amateur station with Greek pop and rock music
972 kHz	Klasiko Radiofono FBI	1976	Greek traditional and laïko (also broadcasts on FM as Galaxias 9.18)
981 kHz	ERA Sport	3 May 1993	National; sports and talk; fourth station of Greek state radio
981 kHz	Athens High Power Station	2015	Amateur station with Greek pop and rock music
1008 kHz	Radio Mimis FlameX	2000	Amateur station with foreign pop and rock music
1017 kHz	Fantastic Radio	1990	Amateur station with foreign pop and rock music
1044 kHz	Thanasis Daffy Duck	1990	Amateur station with Greek pop and rock music
1071 kHz	Studio 033	1985	Amateur station with Greek laïko music
1080 kHz	George Frank	1980	Amateur station with Greek pop and rock music
1089 kHz	Live Music Radio	2000	Amateur station with Greek pop and rock music
1098 kHz	Nick Aquarius Galatsi	1993	Amateur station with Greek pop and rock music
1107 kHz	Radio 322	1990	Amateur station with Greek laïko music
1107 kHz	Radio Junior of Athens	1967	Amateur station with Greek laïko music
1125 kHz	Radio Miniwatt	1978	Amateur station with Greek laïko music
1134 kHz	Anamniseis Margaritiou	1977	Amateur station with Greek laïko music
1143 kHz	Piraeus Galaxy AM	2011	Amateur station with Greek pop and rock music
1161 kHz	Radio Interval	1986	Amateur station with foreign pop and rock music
1170 kHz	Radio Anderson	2019	Amateur station with Greek laïko music
1188 kHz	Nikolas from Elata	1975	Amateur station with Greek pop and rock music
1197 kHz	Radio Lampros Ilios	1975	Amateur station with Greek laïko music
1206 kHz	Radio Meral Athens	1988	Amateur station with Greek laïko music
1224 kHz	Radio Champions	1980	Amateur station with Greek pop and rock music
1242 kHz	Radio Apollon	1998	Amateur station with Greek laïko and rebetiko
1251 kHz	Hawaii Radio	1978	Amateur station with foreign pop and rock music
1260 kHz	Radio Kowalski	1978	Amateur station with foreign pop and rock music
1269 kHz	Radio Faros MW	1999	Amateur station with Greek pop and rock music
1269 kHz	Nikos o Pontios	2009	Amateur station with foreign pop and rock music
1278 kHz	DJ Collector	2015	Amateur station with Greek pop and rock music
1287 kHz	University of West Attica	2021	Amateur station with foreign pop and rock music
1296 kHz	Radio 322 Plus	1990	Amateur station with foreign pop and rock music
1323 kHz	Vangelis Alfa 18 Athens	1978	Amateur station with Greek pop and rock music
1323 kHz	Radio Acropol	1999	Amateur station with Greek traditional music
1332 kHz	Second Programme	11 May 1952	National; Greek music; second station of Greek state radio
1359 kHz	Ilias LMG	1974	Amateur station with Greek pop and rock music
1359 kHz	Radio Alpha – Delta	1977	Amateur station with Greek laïko music
1377 kHz	Argosaronikos	2000	Greek laïko music (different from the former Radio Argosaronikos 106,4)
1377 kHz	University of West Attica	2021	Amateur station with foreign pop and rock music
1395 kHz	Radio Poll 20 Watt	1980	Amateur station with Greek laïko music
1422 kHz	Studio 2000 Mousiko Leoforeio	1982	Amateur station with Greek laïko music
1431 kHz	Thanasis Alfa 55 Radio	1979	Amateur station with Greek laïko music
1449 kHz	Radio Edisson	2003	Amateur station with Greek laïko music
1458 kHz	University of West Attica	2021	Amateur station with foreign pop and rock music
1467 kHz	Radio Atithasos	2004	Amateur station with Greek laïko music
1494 kHz	Studio Annabelle Athens	1987	Amateur station with Greek laïko music
1521 kHz	Laika Dromena	1984	Amateur station with Greek laïko music
1566 kHz	Makrineia Radio 1566	1975	Amateur station with Greek laïko music
1593 kHz	Aiakos Radio	1995	Amateur station with Greek laïko music
1650 kHz	Radio Tripsifios	1984	Amateur station with Greek laïko music

=== In Macedonia ===
The two official state-run radio programmes still broadcast their programmes on the MW: the first programme of the Radio Station of Macedonia on 1053 kHz and the second programme on 1179 kHz (simulcasting along with their FM services). A notable unlicensed radio station in Macedonia is the 1431AM, a free radio station broadcasting regularly from the Aristotle University of Thessaloniki campus in the centre of the city. Other pirate radio stations in the Macedonia area are using the 1566 kHz and the AM expanded band (1600–1710).

Frequency	Name	On air since	Description
792 kHz	ERT Kavalas	1949	News and talk; local station of Greek state radio
972 kHz	Imathia 8–13	2015	Amateur station with Greek laïko music
1017 kHz	Studio 2 Thess	2018	Amateur station with Greek laïko music
1053 kHz	Macedonia 102 FM	1988	News and talk; first station of Greek state radio
1170 kHz	Radiofono Salonikios	2014	Amateur station with Greek laïko music
1179 kHz	Macedonia 95.8 FM	1994	Culture; second station of Greek state radio
1215 kHz	Radio 9	2018	Amateur station with Greek laïko music
1260 kHz	Energy Pella	2015	Amateur station with Greek laïko music
1260 kHz	Seven Salonica	2018	Amateur station with Greek laïko music
1278 kHz	ERT Florina	1956	News and talk; local station of Greek state radio
1296 kHz	Fantasy Radio	2014	Amateur station with Greek laïko music
1368 kHz	Thess Radio 13	2014	Amateur station with Greek laïko music
1377 kHz	Radio Ekfrasi	1998	Amateur station with Greek laïko music
1386 kHz	Makedonia	2014	Amateur station with Greek laïko music
1431 kHz	1431AM	2001	Student radio station from the AUTH
1440 kHz	Canadian	2015	Amateur station with Greek laïko music
1449 kHz	Asygkritos	2015	Amateur station with Greek laïko music
1476 kHz	Studio K–69	2015	Amateur station with Greek laïko music
1476 kHz	Radio Veteranos	2015	Amateur station with Greek laïko music
1521 kHz	Giannis Epouranios	2015	Amateur station with Greek laïko music
1539 kHz	North Sound Radio	2018	Amateur station with Greek laïko music
1566 kHz	Asteras Kilkis	2018	Amateur station with Greek laïko music
1575 kHz	Koursaros	2023	Amateur station with Greek laïko music
1575 kHz	Odysseia	1990	Amateur station with Greek laïko music
1593 kHz	ERT Kozani	1950	News and talk; local station of Greek state radio
1602 kHz	ERT Kavalas	1949	News and talk; local station of Greek state radio
1602 kHz	Radio Varonos	2015	Amateur station with Greek laïko music
1611 kHz	Spyros o Gigantas	2018	Amateur station with Greek laïko music
1620 kHz	Radio Devil Salonica	2018	Amateur station with Greek laïko music
1629 kHz	Kilkis Radio Anatolia	2018	Amateur station with Greek laïko music

=== The rest of Greece ===
State-run ERA radio stations broadcast the ERA International Network programme to the Mediterranean and south-east Europe on 765 kHz (ERT Ioannina), 927 kHz (ERT Zakynthos), 1008 kHz (ERT Corfu), 1260 kHz (ERT Rhodes), 1404 kHz (ERT Komotini) and 1512 kHz (ERT Chania) in Greek. Other regional radio stations still broadcast in AM their programs (ERA National network), such as Kavala and Kozani on the same frequency (1602 kHz) and Heraklion Crete (954 kHz). Numerous pirate stations, many of them high powered, broadcast irregularly throughout Greece. Most are from the central-northern part of the country (Thessaly, West, and Central Macedonia) but there are AM radio pirates in Thrace, Crete, Cyclades and Peloponnese as well. On the AM expanded band (1600–1710) numerous radio pirates transmit experimentally without a regular schedule, or program, mostly Greek popular music along with Q code QSO.

==== Peloponnese ====
Frequency	Name	On air since	Description
630 kHz	Radio Nostalgia	2010	Greek laïko music
1152 kHz	ERT Pyrgos	1954	News, talk and culture
1206 kHz	Sex Machine Patras	1978	Greek and foreign music
1224 kHz	Amateur Radio Tripolis	2021	Greek laïko music
1287 kHz	Participatory Station	2017	Greek laïko music
1287 kHz	Takis Apithanos	2017	Greek laïko music
1305 kHz	ERT Tripolis	1949	News, talk and culture
1341 kHz	Sakis o Epikindynos	2017	Greek laïko music
1377 kHz	Radio Supersonic	1978	Greek laïko music
1440 kHz	Elpida Radio	2023	Greek and foreign music
1485 kHz	Ouranos Radio	2014	Orthodox amateur radio
1539 kHz	Studio A13	2021	Greek and foreign music
1548 kHz	Radio Drastirios	2023	Greek laïko music
1557 kHz	Dimitris A10	2017	Greek and foreign music
1584 kHz	Ilida Radio 9,11	1952	Ilida municipal radio

==== Thessaly ====
Frequency	Name	On air since	Description
1359 kHz	Radio Dynamite	2011	Greek laïko music
1395 kHz	Hawaii of Larissa	2015	Greek laïko music
1449 kHz	Special Radio	2010	Greek laïko music
1485 kHz	ERT Volos	1948	News and talk
1512 kHz	Radio Adiaforos	1981	Greek and foreign pop music
1557 kHz	Pagaseticos (Asymvivastos)	1981	Greek laïko music
1602 kHz	Larissa Radio Geronimo	1983	Greek and foreign pop music
1640 kHz	Kostas o Thessalos	2011	Greek laïko music

==== Central Greece ====
Frequency	Name	On air since	Description
1440 kHz	Agrafa Voice	2011	Amateur station with Greek laïko music
1503 kHz	B19 International	1985	Pirate station with foreign music
1530 kHz	B19 Greek Original	1985	Pirate station with Greek laïko music
1629 kHz	Lambros 3A	2011	Amateur station with Greek laïko music

==== Thrace ====
Frequency	Name	On air since	Description	Transmission
1080 kHz	ERT Orestiada	1965	News and culture	24 hours a day (Daily)
1404 kHz	ERT Komotini (ERT News Radio)	1954	News and culture	24 hours a day (Monday-Thursday); 04:00–23:00 (Friday); 23:00–10:00 (Saturday); 10:00–04:00 (Sunday)
1548 kHz	ERT Orestiada	1965	News and culture	24 hours a day (Daily)
1640 kHz	National Radio Station of Komotini	2011	Greek laïko music	24 hours a day (Daily)

==== Crete ====
Frequency	Name	On air since	Description
783 kHz	ERT Heraklion	1972	News, talk, culture and music
954 kHz	ERT Heraklion	1972	News, talk, culture and music
1512 kHz	ERT Chania	1947	News, talk, culture and music

==== Ioannina ====
Frequency	Name	On air since	Description
1413 kHz	Olytsikas	2021	Amateur station with Greek laïko music
1566 kHz	Radio Alpha 1	2011	Amateur station with Greek laïko music
1603 kHz	Dodoni's Oracle	2011	Amateur station with Greek laïko music

==== Aegean islands ====
Frequency	Name	On air since	Description
837 kHz	Radio Nostalgia	2010	Greek laïko music
1260 kHz	ERT Rhodes	1954	News, talk, culture and music
1314 kHz	ERT Rhodes	1954	News, talk, culture and music

==== Ionian islands ====
Frequency	Name	On air since	Description	Transmission
927 kHz	ERT Zakynthos	1959	News and culture	24 hours a day (Daily)
1008 kHz	ERT Corfu	1957	News and culture	24 hours a day (Daily); 15:00–23:00 (Friday)

== Short Wave (SW band) ==
Frequency	Name	On air since	Description
8500 kHz	Laikos 8,5MHz	1976, reopening 2024	Pirate radio station with Greek laïko music, located in Amaliada
9420 kHz	Voice of Greece	1947	News and talk; fifth programme of Greek state radio

== Digital and Internet Radio ==
Occasional experimental DAB broadcasts were reported in the Athens and Thessaloniki areas on channels 13A, 13B, 13C since 2003. Since January 2018, ERT transmits a DAB+ multiplex on channel 12C (227.360 MHz) from their transmitter site on Mount Ymittos, near Athens. The multiplex contains: "ERT News Radio", "Second Programme", "Third Programme", "ERA Sport", "ERA Kosmos", "Voice of Greece", "Zeppelin", "Deytero Laika", "Deytero Paradosiaka", "Kosmos Jazz", "958 FM", "Radio 80's", "Vintage Radio" & "Trito Maestro". Most radio stations in Greece stream their audio on the Internet.

=== List of digital radio stations ===
Block	Frequency	Name	Location
5A	174.928 MHz	ERT News Radio; Second Programme; Third Programme; ERA Sport; Voice of Greece; Kosmos 93.6; Zeppelin_106.7; Radio 80's 95.8_FM_(Greece); Vintage radio Deytero Laika; Deytero Paradosiaka; Trito Maestro; Kosmos Jazz	Thessaloniki
5A	174.928 MHz	ERT News Radio; Second Programme; Third Programme; ERA Sport; Voice of Greece; Kosmos 93.6; Zeppelin_106.7; Radio 80's 95.8_FM_(Greece); Vintage radio Deytero Laika; Deytero Paradosiaka; Trito Maestro; Kosmos Jazz	Elis
6A	181.936 MHz	ERT News Radio; Second Programme; Third Programme; ERA Sport; Voice of Greece; Kosmos 93.6; Zeppelin_106.7; Radio 80's 95.8_FM_(Greece); Vintage radio Deytero Laika; Deytero Paradosiaka; Trito Maestro; Kosmos Jazz	Argolis
6A	181.936 MHz	ERT News Radio; Second Programme; Third Programme; ERA Sport; Voice of Greece; Kosmos 93.6; Zeppelin_106.7; Radio 80's 95.8_FM_(Greece); Vintage radio Deytero Laika; Deytero Paradosiaka; Trito Maestro; Kosmos Jazz	Magnesia
6A	181.936 MHz	ERT News Radio; Second Programme; Third Programme; ERA Sport; Voice of Greece; Kosmos 93.6; Zeppelin_106.7; Radio 80's 95.8_FM_(Greece); Vintage radio Deytero Laika; Deytero Paradosiaka; Trito Maestro; Kosmos Jazz	Messenia
7A	188.928 MHz	ERT News Radio; Second Programme; Third Programme; ERA Sport; Voice of Greece; Kosmos 93.6; Zeppelin_106.7; Radio 80's 95.8_FM_(Greece); Vintage radio Deytero Laika; Deytero Paradosiaka; Trito Maestro; Kosmos Jazz	Achaea
8A	195.936 MHz	ERT News Radio; Second Programme; Third Programme; ERA Sport; Voice of Greece; Kosmos 93.6; Zeppelin_106.7; Radio 80's 95.8_FM_(Greece); Vintage radio Deytero Laika; Deytero Paradosiaka; Trito Maestro; Kosmos Jazz	Cephalonia
8B	197.648 MHz	Arion Laikos; Envy Radio; Greek Oldies; New Age Radio; UniWA D.R.M.	Attica
9C	206.352 MHz	ERT News Radio; Second Programme; Third Programme; ERA Sport; Voice of Greece; Kosmos 93.6; Zeppelin_106.7; Radio 80's 95.8_FM_(Greece); Vintage radio Deytero Laika; Deytero Paradosiaka; Trito Maestro; Kosmos Jazz	Corinth
10A	209.936 MHz	ERT News Radio; Second Programme; Third Programme; ERA Sport; Voice of Greece; Kosmos 93.6; Zeppelin_106.7; Radio 80's 95.8_FM_(Greece); Vintage radio Deytero Laika; Deytero Paradosiaka; Trito Maestro; Kosmos Jazz	Arcadia
10C	213.360 MHz	ERT News Radio; Second Programme; Third Programme; ERA Sport; Voice of Greece; Kosmos 93.6; Zeppelin_106.7; Radio 80's 95.8_FM_(Greece); Vintage radio Deytero Laika; Deytero Paradosiaka; Trito Maestro; Kosmos Jazz	Arcadia
12B	225.648 MHz	1055 Rock; 89 FM Rainbow; Athlitikos Libero FM; Cosmoradio 95.1 FM; FLY 104 Thessaloniki; FM 100 Thessaloniki; Focus Radio 103.6; Imagine FM 89.7; Metropolis 9.55; Plus Radio 102.6; Radio Thessaloniki; Republic Web Radio; Sarothron Web Radio; Status Radio 107.7; Transistor 100.3; Yellow 101.7	Thessaloniki
12C	227.360 MHz	ERT News Radio; Second Programme; Third Programme; ERA Sport; Voice of Greece; Kosmos 93.6; Zeppelin_106.7; Radio 80's 95.8_FM_(Greece); Vintage radio Deytero Laika; Deytero Paradosiaka; Trito Maestro; Kosmos Jazz	Attica

=== List of internet radio stations ===
Name	On air since	Description	Coverage	Location
1D (Enanti)	2011	Entertainment	Worldwide	Thessaloniki
269 Web Radio	2009	Entertainment	Worldwide	Athens
Achaia Play Radio	2011	Entertainment	Worldwide	Patras
Action Web Konitsa	2006	Entertainment	Worldwide	Konitsa
AEL Radio Larissa	2016	Entertainment	Worldwide	Larissa
Agiasos Mytilene	2009	Entertainment	Worldwide	Agiasos
Agrinio 102.2	1990	Entertainment	Worldwide	Agrinio
AI Waves	2025	Entertainment	Worldwide	Thessaloniki
Akous Web	2010	Entertainment	Worldwide	Thessaloniki
Alpha-Omega	2007	Entertainment	Worldwide	Chios
Andromeda Net	1997	Entertainment	Worldwide	Athens
Anepanaliptos FM	2020	Entertainment	Worldwide	Athens
Anthologia 88,8 fm	2012	Entertainment	Worldwide	Nafplio
Apopsi Kalamatas	2011	Entertainment	Worldwide	Kalamata
Arion Radio GR	2000	Entertainment	Worldwide	Thessaloniki
Arty Web	2012	Entertainment	Worldwide	Thessaloniki
Athens Party	2005	Entertainment	Worldwide	Athens
Athens Up Radio	2014	Entertainment	Worldwide	Athens
Atlantis Web Radio	1990	Entertainment	Worldwide	Athens
Back to Rave Radio	2024	Entertainment	Worldwide	Thessaloniki
Be Rock Internet	2007	Entertainment	Worldwide	Athens
Blues Radio	2012	Entertainment	Worldwide	Athens
ChilloutreePines	2017	Entertainment	Worldwide	Athens
Christian Truth 884	1998	Religious	Worldwide	Livadeia
Christianity 90fm	1993	Religious	Worldwide	Rhodes
Citizen Web	2019	Entertainment	Worldwide	Agios Nikolaos
Club 107.4fm	1992	Entertainment	Worldwide	Thessaloniki
Coni On Air	2015	Entertainment	Worldwide	Athens
Cool 106.5fm	1998	Entertainment	Worldwide	Thessaloniki
Deep Studio	2011	Entertainment	Worldwide	Trikala
Derti FM 98,6	2006	Entertainment	Worldwide	Athens
Detox Radio	2011	Entertainment	Worldwide	Larissa
Diavlos Drama	1987	Entertainment	Worldwide	Drama
Diaxronikos FM	2015	Entertainment	Worldwide	Athens
Disco Athens	2016	Entertainment	Worldwide	Athens
Disco Café	2020	Entertainment	Worldwide	Athens
Disco Net	2020	Entertainment	Worldwide	Athens
Ekfrasi Web	2011	Entertainment	Worldwide	Athens
Ellinadiko 102	2007	Entertainment	Worldwide	Athens
Entropia Web	2014	Entertainment	Worldwide	Thessaloniki
ERT Open	2013	News and talk	Worldwide	Athens
Evia Hi 106,3	2014	Entertainment	Worldwide	Chalcis
F Dance Internet	2014	Entertainment	Worldwide	Piraeus
Fancy Web Radio	2021	Entertainment	Worldwide	Athens
FM Life Kalymnos	1999	Entertainment	Worldwide	Kalymnos
Garavelas' GRadio	2011	Entertainment	Worldwide	Athens
Genesis Web Radio	2007	Entertainment	Worldwide	Athens
Greek Traditional	2007	Entertainment	Worldwide	Athens
Hot FM 104.6	2007	Entertainment	Worldwide	Athens
Hot Komotini	1999	Entertainment	Worldwide	Komotini
Ianos Radio	2012	Entertainment	Worldwide	Thessaloniki
iFeel Radio	2012	Entertainment	Worldwide	Athens
Innersound	2010	Entertainment	Worldwide	Athens
Jazz Café In	2013	Entertainment	Worldwide	Athens
Kalavryta Radio	1990	Entertainment	Worldwide	Athens
Katergaris 91,2 fm	1999	Entertainment	Worldwide	Volos
Kimolos Web Radio	2013	Entertainment	Worldwide	Kimolos
Korinthos 105.6 fm	1989	Entertainment	Worldwide	Korinthos
Laikos FM 96,2	1988	Entertainment	Worldwide	Agrinio
Lakka Souli	2008	Entertainment	Worldwide	Athens
Lampsi	2010	Entertainment	Worldwide	Mytilene
Lanos Web	2016	Entertainment	Worldwide	Athens
Liquid Radio	1997	Entertainment	Worldwide	Athens
Love 106.5	2018	Entertainment	Worldwide	Thessaloniki
Mageia	2011	Entertainment	Worldwide	Astakos
Magic FM	1992	Entertainment	Worldwide	Agrinio
Makelarides	2022	News and talk	Worldwide	Athens
Mancode Web	2013	Entertainment	Worldwide	Athens
Mandra Internet	2021	Entertainment	Worldwide	Mandra
Melodia Kerkyra	1999	Entertainment	Worldwide	Corfu
Melody Music	1993	Entertainment	Worldwide	Volos
Memories	2015	Entertainment	Worldwide	Athens
Methorios News	1992	Entertainment	Worldwide	Orestiada
Mikel of Thessalia	2012	Entertainment	Worldwide	Larissa
Mikrasiatis Network	2009	Entertainment	Worldwide	Athens
Minore Web Radio	1995	Entertainment	Worldwide	Athens
Mood Web Radio	2009	Entertainment	Worldwide	Thessaloniki
Mondo Bongo	2011	Entertainment	Worldwide	Athens
More FM 103,9	2022	Entertainment	Worldwide	Alexandroupolis
More Radio 103	2013	Entertainment	Worldwide	Thessaloniki
Mousiko Kanali	2014	Entertainment	Worldwide	Lamia
Mousikos 98.6	2017	Entertainment	Worldwide	Athens
Music Factory	2008	Entertainment	Worldwide	Athens
Music Galaxy	1994	Entertainment	Worldwide	Athens
Music Galaxy	2015	Entertainment	Worldwide	Thessaloniki
Music Polis	1996	Entertainment	Worldwide	Heraklion
Must Radio	2010	Entertainment	Worldwide	Athens
Mytilene 108	1999	Entertainment	Worldwide	Mytilene
New Age Radio	2014	Entertainment	Worldwide	Athens
Next Generation	2010	Entertainment	Worldwide	Athens
Nicodemus Radio	2020	Religious	Worldwide	Pyrgetos
Nitro 1025 Athens	1995	Entertainment	Worldwide	Athens
Nitro Thessaloniki	2010	Entertainment	Worldwide	Thessaloniki
Notes Web Radio	2019	Entertainment	Worldwide	Thessaloniki
NV - Envy Radio	2013	Entertainment	Worldwide	Athens
Off Salonica	2008	Entertainment	Worldwide	Thessaloniki
OK Radio	2015	Entertainment	Worldwide	Kilkis
Old Radio	2019	Entertainment	Worldwide	Thessaloniki
Omega Web	2013	Entertainment	Worldwide	Athens
Orthodoxo Fos	2020	Religious	Worldwide	Megalopolis
Otaku Radio	2013	Entertainment	Worldwide	Athens
Over FM	2020	Entertainment	Worldwide	Athens
Palmos FM	1999	Entertainment	Worldwide	Patras
Pame Radio	2012	Entertainment	Worldwide	Athens
Panda Radio	2012	Entertainment	Worldwide	Athens
Peiratikos FM	2019	Entertainment	Worldwide	Athens
Perfect Web	2009	Entertainment	Worldwide	Volos
Psyndora	2014	Entertainment	Worldwide	Athens
Radio 69	2013	Entertainment	Worldwide	Volos
Radio Art	2006	Entertainment	Worldwide	Athens
Radio City	2004	Entertainment	Worldwide	Kos
Radio Fanos	2020	Entertainment	Worldwide	Fanos, Kilkis
Radio Fantasy	2019	Entertainment	Worldwide	Thessaloniki
Radio In 106,5fm	1985	Entertainment	Worldwide	Mandra
Radio Mpoukouras	2013	Entertainment	Worldwide	Athens
Radio Paris Attica	2010	Entertainment	Worldwide	Athens
Radio Play 91,5	2012	Entertainment	Worldwide	Xanthi
Radio Strouga	2022	Entertainment	Worldwide	Athens
Rare Radio	2016	Entertainment	Worldwide	Athens
Rebetiko Web	2014	Entertainment	Worldwide	Athens
Republic 100.3	2005	Entertainment	Worldwide	Thessaloniki
Rock Lab Web	2015	Entertainment	Worldwide	Thessaloniki
Rock Melodic	2012	Entertainment	Worldwide	Athens
Rock Velvet	2009	Entertainment	Worldwide	Athens
Rockarolla	2010	Entertainment	Worldwide	Thessaloniki
Rythmos FM	2006	Entertainment	Worldwide	Argos
Salonica Fresh	2014	Entertainment	Worldwide	Thessaloniki
Samothraki Web	1992	Entertainment	Worldwide	Samothrace
Saronikos Radio	2025	Entertainment	Worldwide	Kalivia Thorikou
Sarothron Radio	2021	Entertainment	Worldwide	Thessaloniki
Simple Web Radio	2013	Entertainment	Worldwide	Thessaloniki
Smooth Web Radio	2018	Entertainment	Worldwide	Thessaloniki
South Hemisphere	2019	Entertainment	Worldwide	Athens
Splash 108 FM	1993	Entertainment	Worldwide	Thessaloniki
Star FM 97.1	1989	Entertainment	Worldwide	Thessaloniki
Star FM 104.6	1986	Entertainment	Worldwide	Symi
Star Radio	2006	Entertainment	Worldwide	Athens
Star Radio	2020	Entertainment	Worldwide	Thessaloniki
Status Radio	2011	Entertainment	Worldwide	Rhodes
Sto Mauve 91,4	2015	Entertainment	Worldwide	Thessaloniki
Stone Web Radio	2014	Entertainment	Worldwide	Athens
Strofi (Kethea)	2010	Entertainment	Worldwide	Athens
Strummer	2019	Entertainment	Worldwide	Athens
Studio 3	1988	Entertainment	Worldwide	Thessaloniki
Studio 110	2011	Entertainment	Worldwide	Thessaloniki
Studio 254	2017	Entertainment	Worldwide	Athens
Studio 545	2014	Entertainment	Worldwide	Athens
Super FM 101	1993	Entertainment	Worldwide	Thessaloniki
Symi Web Radio	2011	Entertainment	Worldwide	Symi
Thalassolikos FM	1997	Entertainment	Worldwide	Orestiada
Thanx of Athens	2015	Entertainment	Worldwide	Athens
Ti Amo Internet	2004	Entertainment	Worldwide	Athens
Trance Athens	2011	Entertainment	Worldwide	Athens
Vanilla Radio	2011	Entertainment	Worldwide	Pyrgos
Velika 9,22	1991	Entertainment	Worldwide	Velika
Vip Internet	2023	Entertainment	Worldwide	Athens
Voice Athens	2017	Entertainment	Worldwide	Athens
Volos FM 879	2009	Entertainment	Worldwide	Volos
Vorras Radio	2011	Entertainment	Worldwide	Thessaloniki
Xenios FM	1987	Entertainment	Worldwide	Athens
Xenyxtis	2009	Entertainment	Worldwide	Mytilene
Yan Radio	2011	Entertainment	Worldwide	Athens

== Defunct stations ==
- You FM (Greece)

== See also ==
- List of Internet radio stations
- List of Greek-language television channels
- Lists of radio stations in Europe (this list only includes international stations i.e. NRG)
