= Greece in the Eurovision Song Contest 2016 =

- Eurovision Song Contest 2016
- Participating broadcaster: Hellenic Broadcasting Corporation (ERT)
- Country: Greece
- Selection process: Internal selection
- Announcement date: Artist: 9 February 2016; Song: 10 March 2016

Competing entry
- Song: "Utopian Land"
- Artist: Argo
- Songwriters: Vladimiros Sofianidis

Placement
- Semi-final result: Failed to qualify (16th)

Participation chronology

Greece was represented at the Eurovision Song Contest 2016 with the song "Utopian Land", written by Vladimiros Sofianidis and performed by the band Argo. The Greek participating broadcaster, the Hellenic Broadcasting Corporation (ERT), internally selected its entry for the contest. Argo were announced as the Greek representatives on 9 February 2016, a month before their song "Utopian Land" was presented.

To promote the entry, a music video for "Utopian Land" was released and Argo performed the song at the INFE Greece Eurovision Party in Athens. Greece was drawn to compete in the first semi-final of the Eurovision Song Contest which took place on 10 May 2016. Performing during the show in position 2, "Utopian Land" was not announced among the top 10 entries of the first semi-final and therefore did not qualify to compete in the final. This marked the first time that Greece failed to qualify to the final of the Eurovision Song Contest since the introduction of semi-finals in 2004. It was later revealed that Greece placed 16th out of the 18 participating countries in the semi-final with 44 points.

== Background ==
Prior to the 2016 contest, Greece had participated in the Eurovision Song Contest 36 times since their debut in 1974. To this point, they won the contest once, in 2005 with the song "My Number One" performed by Helena Paparizou. Following the introduction of semi-finals for the 2004 contest, Greece managed to thus far qualify to the final with each of their entries. Between 2004 and 2011, the nation achieved eight consecutive top ten placements in the final. To this point, Greece's least successful result in the final was 20th place, which they achieved in 1998 with the song "Mia krifi evaisthisia" by Thalassa and in 2014 with the song "Rise Up" by Freaky Fortune and RiskyKidd. In 2015, Greece placed 19th in the final with the song "One Last Breath" performed by Maria Elena Kyriakou.

As part of its duties as participating broadcaster, the Hellenic Broadcasting Corporation (ERT) organises the selection of its entry in the Eurovision Song Contest and broadcasts the event in the country. ERT's predecessor, the National Radio Television Foundation (EIRT), debuted in the contest in 1974 and then ERT participated from 1975 until 2013, when the broadcaster was shut down by a government directive and replaced with the interim Dimosia Tileorasi (DT) and later by the New Hellenic Radio, Internet and Television (NERIT) broadcaster. On 28 April 2015, a legislative proposal that resulted in the renaming of NERIT to ERT was approved and signed into law by the Hellenic Parliament; ERT began broadcasting once again on 11 June. ERT then confirmed its intentions to participate at the Eurovision Song Contest 2016 on 28 August 2015.

For the three contests preceding 2016, television channel MAD TV had organised a national final to select the entry for Greece. For the 2016 contest, however, ERT regained the role of deciding the entry, opting for an internal selection. This was the first time since 2004 that the broadcaster did not use a national final to select its artist and/or song.

== Before Eurovision ==
=== Internal selection ===
On 2 February 2016, ERT announced that they would be selecting Greece's act and song internally. A week later on 9 February 2016, they issued a press release that confirmed the band Argo (formerly known as Europond) as the Greek representatives for the 2016 contest. Argo consisted of six members at the time of the announcement: Christina Lachana, Maria Venetikidou, Vladimiros Sofianidis, Kostas Topouzis, Ilias Kesidis and Alekos Papadopoulos. Prior to selecting Argo, ERT had also approached other artists including Mariza Rizou, Irene Skylakaki and Eleonora Zouganeli.

The song that Argo participated with in the Eurovision Song Contest, "Utopian Land", was presented on 10 March 2016 through a televised press conference and radio premiere. It was presented via three of Hellenic Radio's stations: ERA 1, ERA 2 and KOSMOS. The press conference was held at Hellenic Radio's Studio E at the House of Radio in Athens and was televised during the ERT1 programme Studio 3, hosted by Marilena Katsimi and Silas Seraphim. In regards to the song, ERT director Dionisis Tsaknis stated: "The song has strong ethnic and Balkan sounds, but not in a traditional way. It's an exciting song in Greek, bringing the country's own identity to the contest. The lyrics will refer to the refugee crisis and the financial difficulties we are facing, but the song is really happy and upbeat." "Utopian Land", which was written by Argo band member Vladimiros Sofianidis, contains lyrics in English and Greek including phrases in the Pontic Greek dialect.

=== Promotion ===
To promote "Utopian Land", the official music video, produced by Beetroot productions and filmed in Thessaloniki, was screened on 10 March 2016 at the time of the song's reveal. A re-edited version of the video, adding shots of the song's singers, was later released in early May. To further promote the entry, the group performed live at the INFE Greece Eurovision Party in Athens where they were joined by the likes of Constantinos Christoforou, Barrice and RiskyKidd. They then spoke to Alpha TV responding to criticism their song had received from the public.

== At Eurovision ==
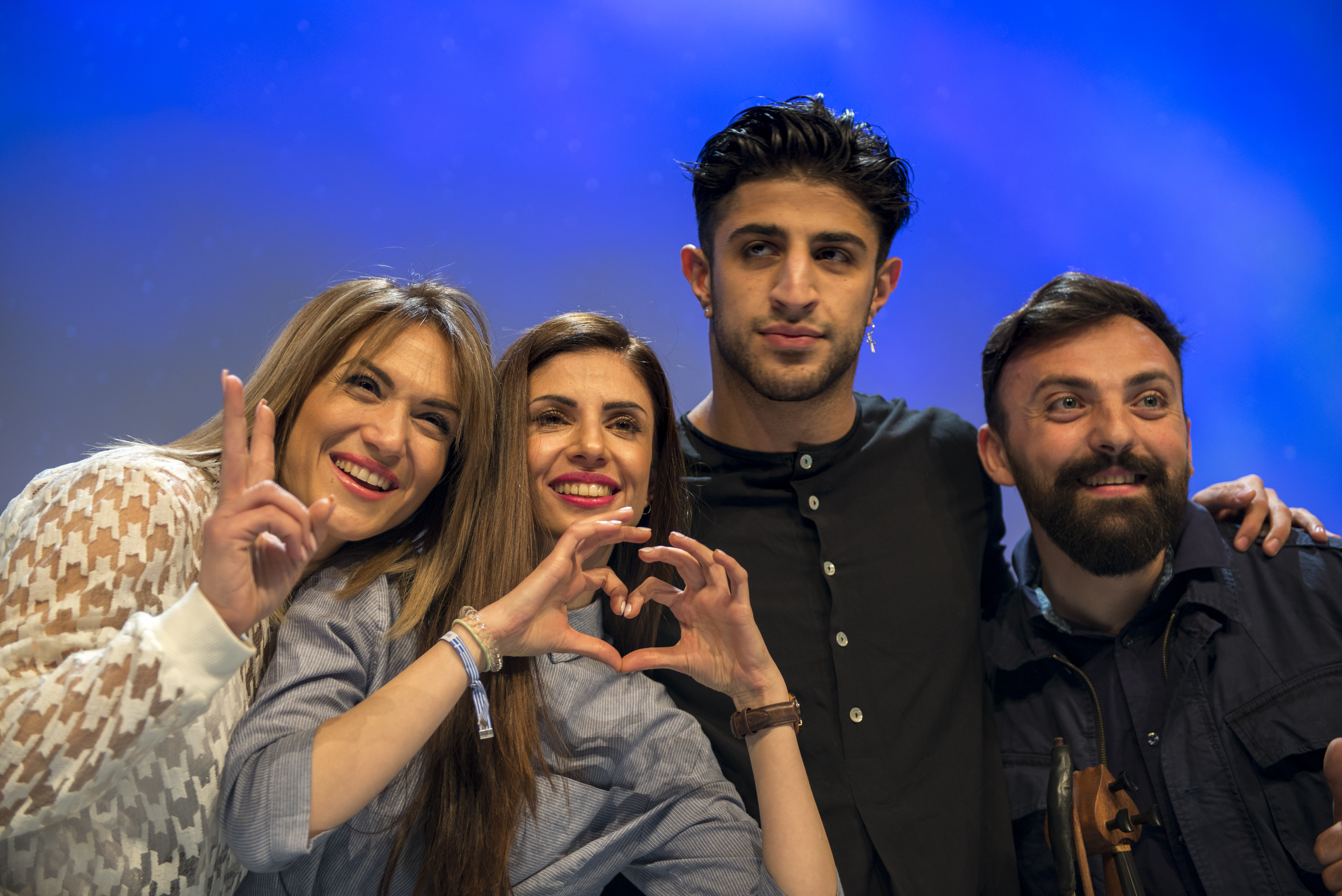
Argo during a press meet and greet

The Eurovision Song Contest 2016 took place at Globe Arena in Stockholm, Sweden. It consisted of two semi-finals held on 10 and 12 May, respectively, and the final on 14 May 2016. According to Eurovision rules, all nations with the exceptions of the host country and the "Big Five", consisting of France, Germany, Italy, Spain and the United Kingdom, were required to qualify from one of two semi-finals in order to compete for the final; the top 10 countries from each semi-final progress to the final. The EBU split up the competing countries into six different pots based on voting patterns from previous contests, with the goal of reducing the amount of neighbourly voting. On 25 January 2016, an allocation draw was held which placed each country into one of the two semi-finals and determined which half of the show they would perform in. Greece was placed into the first semi-final, held on 10 May 2016, and was scheduled to perform in the first half of the show.

Once all the competing songs for the 2016 contest had been released, the running order for the semi-finals was decided by the shows' producers rather than through another draw, so that similar songs were not placed next to each other. Greece was set to perform second, following the entry from Finland and before the entry from Moldova. The two semi-finals and the final were televised in Greece on ERT1 and ERT HD, via radio on ERA 2 and Voice of Greece and online via www.ert.gr, all with commentary by Maria Kozakou and Giorgos Kapoutzidis.

=== Performances ===
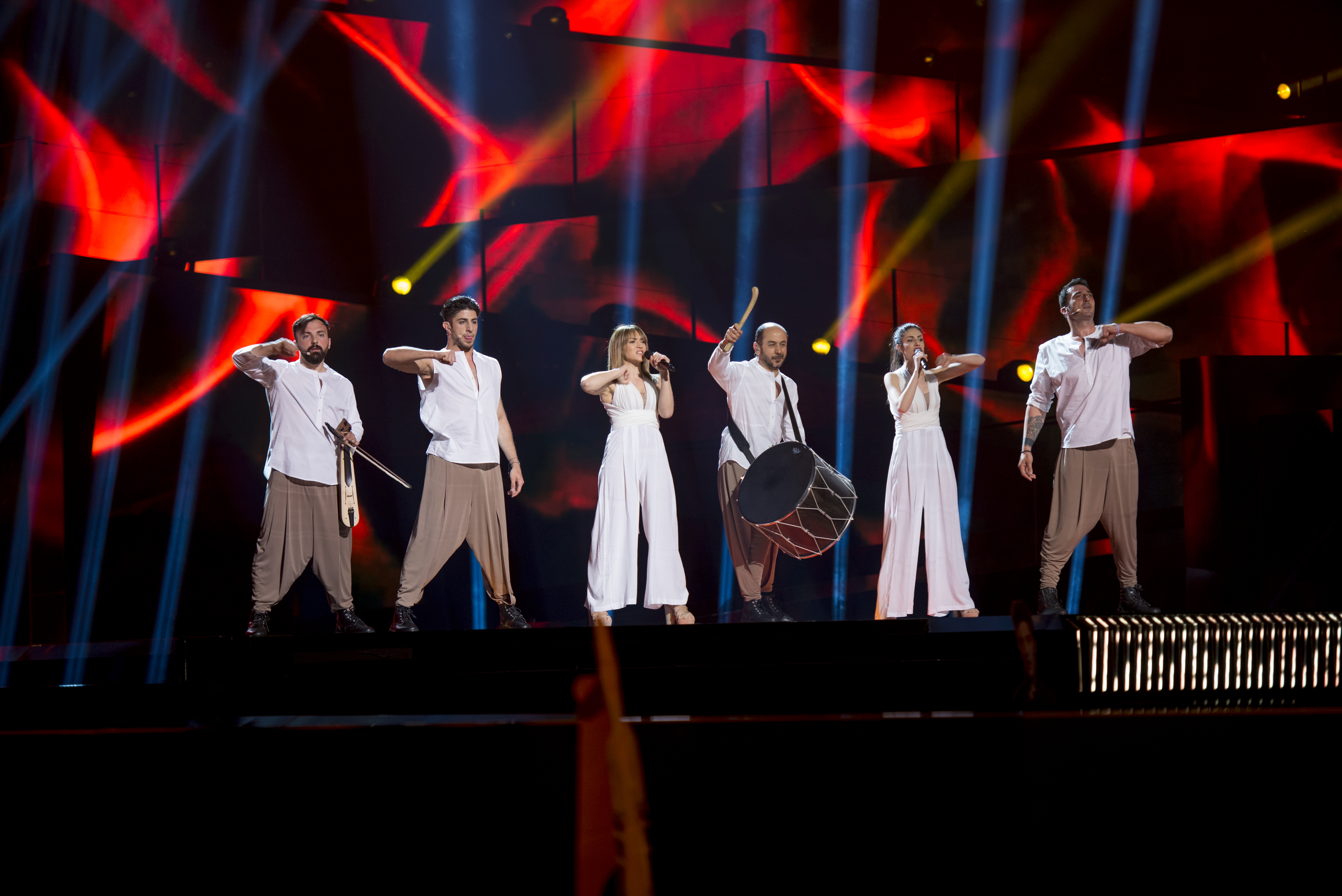
Argo during a rehearsal before the first semi-final

Argo took part in technical rehearsals on 2 and 6 May 2016, followed by dress rehearsals on 9 and 10 May. This included the jury show on 9 May where the professional juries of each country watched and voted on the competing entries. Heading into the first semi-final, CNN reported that bookmakers and polls ranked the entry 34th of the 42 entries, indicating a likely non-qualification to the final.

The Greek performance featured five of the members of Argo performing together on stage with a male dancer; the female members were dressed in white jumpsuits, while the male members were dressed in white shirts and light brown baggy trousers. The performance was choreographed by Maria Lyraraki with lighting design by Konstantinos Garinis and costumes designed by Yiorgos Mesimeris. For the performance, Argo member Elias Kesides was replaced by dancer Vasilis Roxenos.

At the end of the show, Greece was not announced among the top 10 entries in the first semi-final and therefore failed to qualify to compete in the final. It was later revealed that Greece placed 16th in the semi-final, receiving a total of 44 points: 22 points from the televoting and 22 points from the juries. This marked the first time that Greece failed to qualify to the final since the introduction of semi-finals in 2004, and the first time that the nation was absent from a final since 2000. In response to the result, Greece's Star Channel wrote that most Greeks were not surprised since they never really supported its selection in the first place. Following continued criticism of the entry's result specifically blaming Tsaknis for Argo's selection, ERT's CEO Lambis Tagmatarchis released a statement defending Tsaknis, pointing out that it was a collective decision to send them and that Argo deserves "congratulations for their effort".

=== Voting ===
Voting during the three shows was conducted under a new system that involved each country now awarding two sets of points from 1-8, 10 and 12: one from their professional jury and the other from televoting. Each nation's jury consisted of five music industry professionals who are citizens of the country they represent, with their names published before the contest to ensure transparency. This jury judged each entry based on: vocal capacity; the stage performance; the song's composition and originality; and the overall impression by the act. In addition, no member of a national jury was permitted to be connected in any way to any of the competing acts in such a way that they cannot vote impartially and independently. The individual rankings of each jury member as well as the nation's televoting results were released shortly after the final. Greece's jury consisted of Mariza Fakli, Lambros Konstantaras, Christiana Stamatelou, Georgios Segredakis and Adam Tsarouchis. The Greek spokesperson, who announced the top 12-point score awarded by the Greek jury during the final, was Constantinos Christoforou, who previously represented Cyprus in the Eurovision Song Contest as a solo artist in 1996 and 2005 as well as in 2002 as part of the boy band One. Greece received its only top 12-point score from Cyprus' televote, while the nation awarded its 12 points to Cyprus through televote and Russia through jury in both the first semi-final and final. The tables below visualise a complete breakdown of points awarded to Greece in the first semi-final, as well as by the country in both the first semi-final and final of the Eurovision Song Contest 2016.

==== Points awarded to Greece ====
Points awarded to Greece (Semi-final 1)
Score	Televote	Jury
12 points	Cyprus	
10 points		
8 points		
7 points	Armenia	Russia
6 points		Azerbaijan
5 points		
4 points		
3 points	Russia	Armenia; Cyprus; Montenegro
2 points		
1 point		

==== Points awarded by Greece ====
Points awarded by Greece (Semi-final 1)
Score	Televote	Jury
12 points	Cyprus	Russia
10 points	Russia	Armenia
8 points	Armenia	Cyprus
7 points	Hungary	Hungary
6 points	San Marino	Montenegro
5 points	Austria	Azerbaijan
4 points	Croatia	Malta
3 points	Czech Republic	Moldova
2 points	Netherlands	Austria
1 point	Malta	Netherlands

Points awarded by Greece (Final)
Score	Televote	Jury
12 points	Cyprus	Russia
10 points	Russia	Armenia
8 points	Armenia	Cyprus
7 points	Bulgaria	Australia
6 points	Ukraine	France
5 points	Australia	Georgia
4 points	France	Malta
3 points	Poland	Hungary
2 points	Hungary	Ukraine
1 point	Austria	Azerbaijan

==== Detailed voting results ====
The following members comprised the Greek jury:

- Mariza Fakli (jury chairperson) – artists' public relations
- Lambros Konstantaras – radio producer, journalist
- Christiana Stamatelou – journalist, music producer
- Georgios Segredakis – curator stage presence, costume designer
- Adam Tsarouchis – singer

Detailed voting results from Greece (Semi-final 1)
R/O	Country	Jury							Televote	
R/O	Country	M. Fakli	L. Konstantaras	C. Stamatelou	G. Segredakis	A. Tsarouchis	Rank	Points	Rank	Points
01	Finland	17	16	17	12	14	17		16	
02	Greece									
03	Moldova	9	9	7	10	10	8	3	11	
04	Hungary	5	3	9	11	4	4	7	4	7
05	Croatia	16	10	16	6	17	14		7	4
06	Netherlands	2	13	15	3	15	10	1	9	2
07	Armenia	3	5	2	2	2	2	10	3	8
08	San Marino	14	17	14	14	13	16		5	6
09	Russia	1	1	1	1	3	1	12	2	10
10	Czech Republic	10	4	13	15	8	11		8	3
11	Cyprus	4	2	4	5	1	3	8	1	12
12	Austria	15	11	3	13	5	9	2	6	5
13	Estonia	11	15	10	4	12	12		14	
14	Azerbaijan	6	8	8	7	7	6	5	12	
15	Montenegro	7	6	6	8	6	5	6	17	
16	Iceland	12	14	11	16	11	13		15	
17	Bosnia and Herzegovina	13	12	12	17	16	15		13	
18	Malta	8	7	5	9	9	7	4	10	1

Detailed voting results from Greece (Final)
R/O	Country	Jury							Televote	
R/O	Country	M. Fakli	L. Konstantaras	C. Stamatelou	G. Segredakis	A. Tsarouchis	Rank	Points	Rank	Points
01	Belgium	19	26	23	26	10	24		13	
02	Czech Republic	20	6	24	23	19	18		26	
03	Netherlands	2	20	12	12	18	13		18	
04	Azerbaijan	10	7	7	21	9	10	1	19	
05	Hungary	11	4	14	13	8	8	3	9	2
06	Italy	12	14	22	24	3	15		11	
07	Israel	15	23	21	20	17	22		23	
08	Bulgaria	13	8	9	14	13	11		4	7
09	Sweden	18	19	15	11	26	16		15	
10	Germany	22	22	25	25	24	26		24	
11	France	8	11	10	2	7	5	6	7	4
12	Poland	25	24	26	15	15	25		8	3
13	Australia	6	5	3	3	14	4	7	6	5
14	Cyprus	4	2	5	5	1	3	8	1	12
15	Serbia	14	21	17	22	20	19		17	
16	Lithuania	23	16	16	16	23	20		20	
17	Croatia	24	15	18	18	25	23		25	
18	Russia	1	1	1	1	4	1	12	2	10
19	Spain	16	17	20	17	21	17		14	
20	Latvia	17	18	19	19	22	21		16	
21	Ukraine	3	13	13	6	16	9	2	5	6
22	Malta	9	9	8	10	6	7	4	22	
23	Georgia	7	10	4	7	12	6	5	12	
24	Austria	26	12	11	8	5	12		10	1
25	United Kingdom	21	25	6	9	11	14		21	
26	Armenia	5	3	2	4	2	2	10	3	8
