= Television in Greece =

Television broadcasting in Greece began in 1966, preceded in 1951 by statute 1963 permitting television broadcasting.

== History ==
=== First broadcasts ===
The first television broadcast in Greece became a reality during the 25th Thessaloniki International Fair (3 September 1960). The Studios were organized by the Public Power Corporation (ΔΕΗ) pavilion, supplied by Philips, along with other locally improvised equipment. Some years later, a small privately owned television station started operating round the year from another pavilion in the same fair. This station operated until 1968 when the two new government channels started operation in Thessaloniki and requested the elimination of the "illegal" television station.

The two government channels, which held a television monopoly, during that period were ERT and YENED (for the military forces).

=== A third state TV channel, its closure and color TV in Greece ===
After the construction of the OTE Tower in the Thessaloniki Fair area, OTE started a third state TV channel in the SECAM color format. The two initial state channels requested the closing and elimination of the new OTE channel, fearing that OTE would drive them to close, because of the superiority of the color picture, the telecommunications network and the technical superiority of OTE. They succeeded and all the equipment, that OTE already had, passed to YENED, which started what now became ERT3, still broadcasting from Thessaloniki to this day. During the Greek military government period of 1967–74, the programs were a mixture of news and entertainment. A notable serial which still owns the watching record was the war drama O Agnostos Polemos (The Unknown War).

After the restoration of the Republic in 1974, the Hellenic Broadcasting Corporation continue to dominate, appealing to a much larger audience than YENED. Color television broadcasts began in the late 1970s and notable people were placed to improve the quality of the national channels, such as Dimitris Horn, Manos Hatzidakis and the Nobel laureate poet Odysseas Elytis. Color television was officially introduced in 1979, using the French SECAM system. ERT would later merge with YENED in 1982.

=== The merger of ERT and YENED ===
In 1982, ERT and YENED merged, forming "ERT" (Ellinikí Radiofonía Tileórasi), with ERT becoming "ERT1" and YENED becoming "ERT2". Broadcasts originally lasted for seven to eight hours daily starting at about 5:30PM with children shows and then the first televised news of the day. In 1987 an experimental teletext type information screen known as "Tilegrafos" (meaning televised words, i.e. telegraph) showed written information on ET2 during the afternoon. By the late 1980s, television broadcasts on ET1 and ET2 (still commonly known as ERT-1 and ERT-2 until later years) had increased to 12–15 hours daily, though it was still common for one or both stations to sign off briefly in the afternoon and sign back on in the early evening hours.

=== Illegal broadcasts, disputes between the government and Thessaloniki, constant frequency changes, and challenges to ERT's monopoly ===
Some illegal broadcasts made short-lived appearances during the 1980s showing mainly movies of adult nature but, in 1987, the City of Thessaloniki began rebroadcasting in a television frequency parts of European satellite channels, leading to a dispute between the government and the city, as the station's equipment was confiscated numerous times. The more serious challenge to ERT's monopoly, however, appeared with the establishment and operation of TV Plus in the Piraeus area, which began broadcasting major American films to the starved-for-diversity people of Athens. It is then that ERT decided to preempt the challenge to its monopoly and any further attempts to put private broadcasts on the air, by re-broadcasting itself foreign satellite channels. In October 1988, the first of these satellite channels made it to the airwaves in Athens to block the frequency used by TV Plus, and as this popular television station kept changing its frequency, more and more satellite channels were added by ERT to block the frequencies used by TV Plus. They included: Super Channel from the United Kingdom, TV5 from France, Sat.1 from Germany, Rai 2 from Italy, and Soviet Central Television from the Soviet Union via the Gorizont satellite. These channel were soon followed by MTV Europe and Sky Channel from the United Kingdom, while the broadcasts of Super Channel was taken over by TV Plus, due to the lack of an actual agreement with ERT. Sky Channel eventually morphed into what is now known as Eurosport, which is still rebroadcast in Greece, and Euronews, Rai 1 and Cyprus SAT were eventually added to the lineup. For a short time, NBC Europe was also rebroadcast, as were RTL Plus and 3sat from Germany.

=== Establishment of regional channels ===
In 1988, ERT also established ET3 a regional state-owned network which focused on issues of Northern Greece, to counter the Athens-centric broadcasts of the other two major state broadcasters at the time. Initially a regional network based in Thessaloniki, ET3 also began broadcasting in Athens, and within a few years, in most other regions of the country.

=== The end of the state-owned monopoly on television ===
Thessaloniki was the home of Greece's first non-state owned television station, TV100, owned by the City of Thessaloniki, and TV Plus was the first non-state television station in the Athens region. TV Plus, was owned by Invest Plus SA, a US group headed by Daniel Bourla, with the participation of the Municipality of Piraeus, and its programming was quite innovative for Greek standards at the time, as it broadcast first-run Hollywood feature films with subtitles and no commercials. Soon, TV Plus began to offer an over-the-air subscription service, broadcasting an encoded signal 24-hours a day, which viewers could watch by obtaining a decoder (provided for free by the station) and paying a monthly subscription fee. This was especially revolutionary at the time, as a legal framework for private broadcasting, and private broadcasters, still did not exist in the country.

ERT did not take too kindly to the new television stations which began to crop up on the dial following the government's unsuccessful attempts to stop TV Plus, often changing the frequencies of its own stations around or adding repeaters, to interfere with new private broadcasts. However, in 1989, the Greek Parliament finally passed legislation legalizing private broadcasting (radio and television) and providing provisional licenses to two broadcasters, Mega Channel and Nea Tileorasi (New Television). Mega Channel began officially broadcasting in November 1989 as a national network, while Nea Tileorasi, after several months of broadcasting test bars, disappeared from the airwaves.

Other private broadcasters took advantage of loopholes in the existing legislation and the lack of an organized licensing process to begin broadcasting almost overnight. In December 1989, Antenna TV began broadcasting nationally, named after the successful new radio station by the same name. Mega and Antenna featured similar programming styles, with locally produced comedies and dramas, numerous variety shows (following in the Italian tradition), American films, and tabloid news broadcasts. They immediately won over most of ERT's audience and advertising share, and to this day, are interchangeably the #1 and #2 stations in the audience ratings in Greece, while the ratings of ET1, ET2, and ET3 plummeted (they have recovered significantly since then but still do not challenge the major private networks).

=== Growth of privately-owned broadcasters ===
By early 1990, numerous other stations also appeared on the air, including New Channel (no relation to Nea Tileorasi) with movies, music videos and talk shows, Channel Seven-X (with avant-garde programming including foreign films, intellectual programming and a simulcast of French music TV network MCM), Jeronimo Groovy TV (initially a popular music video station that broadcast in Athens, amidst serious interference from other stations), TeleCity (a right-wing political station with news and talk shows), 902 TV (owned by the Communist Party of Greece), Kanali 29 (a television station with political and cultural programs and a cult following), and a plethora of other broadcasters, which filled every available VHF and UHF frequency, often broadcasting only for several weeks or months, or with very little programming of note. Many broadcasters even began to broadcast on the same frequencies as other stations, especially ERT's satellite broadcasts, many of which soon completely disappeared from the airwaves, as ERT seemed unwilling or unable to protect its frequencies. Similarly, private stations sprung up throughout the country, in every city and region and most towns.

=== SECAM to PAL switchover ===
The color television transmission system SECAM which had been used since the late 1970s finally switched over to the PAL color system widely used in the rest of Europe. PAL was the system used for years in Greece via video tape playbacks on rented movies from video stores but not by ERT. The first station to broadcast in PAL was TV Plus. Many other privately owned stations also followed suit and eventually by ERT.

=== Continued growth of privately-owned broadcasters and specialty TV, and mergers and acquisitions ===
In 1993, two new major players entered the market. Skai TV began broadcasting, after a prolonged battle for open frequencies with ERT and other stations, and soon began to broadcast as a new national network following in the footsteps of the highly rated Skai radio station in Athens. Also in 1993, Kanali 29's management was handed over to Niko Mastorakis, who was once again involved in Greek media after a long stint as a movie producer and director in the United States. Kanali 29 was renamed Star Channel, and featured programming rich in American films and TV series, and talk and lifestyle programmes. Star also began to broadcast nationally.

The following year, ERT decommissioned many of its terrestrial satellite broadcasts, and reassigned many of those now-vacant frequencies to Multichoice Hellas, for terrestrial pay services a year after TV Plus went off the air following a dispute with Time Warner that had acquired a 25% interest in the company. The name of this new pay-TV service was Filmnet. In 1995, Multichoice followed with another station, Supersport, which soon earned the broadcast rights to many Greek sports.

In 1997, ERT, whose audience had never recovered from the advent of private television, and which up until then lagged behind technologically compared to the largest private networks, revamped its operations, unveiling new logos and a new programming philosophy. The stations were modernized, and ET2 was renamed "NET" (Nea Elliniki Tileorassi). ET1 focused on general-interest programming (movies, sports, various TV series), while NET focused heavily on news and talk programming. ET3 continued to focus largely on Northern Greece, with a large dose of cultural programming.

By the late 1990s, Greece began to see its first major mergers and acquisitions (some of them ill-fated) in the realm of broadcast media. Skai TV was sold, and soon became known as "Alpha-Sky" before completely phasing into its current name as Alpha. Kanali 5, a regional television network broadcasting out of Athens, by the former owners of Kanali 29 (and with similar programming to that station), was also revamped, transitioning to "Alter 5" (with a program aimed largely at teenagers and young adults) before fully renaming itself to Alter. Its broadcast reach also gradually expanded, and the station now covers almost the entire country. Channel Seven-X, facing financial difficulties, was also sold, and was renamed Seven, featuring programming heavy on sports and news/talk programs. Seven never quite achieved the success of some of the other stations, as it continued to face financial difficulties even after the sale, and never was able to broadcast outside of certain large cities in the country. New Channel, which broadcast in many major cities but did not offer much original programming, was sold to a new investor and renamed "New Tempo" and finally "Tempo TV", building up a national network of repeaters in an effort to become a major player in the television market, which it partially succeeded in, before financial troubles led to its failure in 2001. Finally, Makedonia TV, a regional private network broadcasting out of Thessaloniki, was purchased by the Antenna Group, and has served as a secondary network featuring many old programs from Antenna TV, American TV series, and a newscast focusing on Northern Greece. The station now also broadcasts nationally.

Specialty networks had also begun to form. In 1992, TVC, Greece's first 24h music channel, began operating in Lesvos island. The channel during the 2000s reformed into the pan-European Music Force Europe, available in 3 countries. Then, in 1996, Mad TV began operating out of Athens, replacing a small local channel known as Art 68. Mad TV featured programming heavy on hit music clips, similar to MTV and its Greek predecessor Jeronimo Groovy TV (which continued to exist but with a small coverage area and with programming more heavily dependent on talk); both channels, in opposition to TVC, operated in a few-hour rotation. Mad TV did not build a national network of its own, but instead was rebroadcast through local stations throughout the country. TV 0-6 began broadcasting in Athens, with many cartoons and children's shows, while TV Magic, after an ill-fated attempt to become a news-talk station owned by Sokratis Kokkalis, became a station focusing on sports and particularly of Greek sports club Olympiacos, which Kokkalis also owned. Extra Channel was founded in 2000 with a heavy talk focus, and is now known as Extra 3.

In 1999, Multichoice Hellas also formed Nova, Greece's first satellite television subscription service, which initially featured most (but not all) of Greece's major networks, as well as many international networks, and other music and interactive services, which it has continued to expand since then. Nova was to be followed by a competing satellite platform, known as "Magna", by the owners of Seven, which never began operations.

=== Satellite television, failed ventures and the investment and creation of new ventures ===
In 2000, Alpha TV founded Alpha Digital, which broadcast Alpha TV, Polis TV (a local station serving Athens owned by Alpha) various thematic stations also operated by Alpha, the radio stations owned by the Alpha group, and a small variety of foreign television networks, headlined by MTV and VH1 (MTV, by that time, was no longer rebroadcast terrestrially in Greece, that ceased in 1999). Despite the popularity of MTV and VH1 and Alpha earning the rights to Greek soccer matches, the company soon went under, leaving Nova as the only company providing pay-TV services in Greece to this day. Plans for a satellite bouquet managed by OTE (the Greek telecommunications company) never went past the test phase, with OTE leasing frequencies on the Hot Bird satellite, rebroadcasting several smaller Greek TV stations as well as many radio stations free-to-air.

The past few years had seen the failure of many television ventures, but the creation and investment in many new ones. Polis TV was relaunched as Channel 9 in December 2005, with programming heavy on news and talk shows. More recently, the original owners of Skai TV returned to the television business, relaunching Skai on the frequencies of Seven TV. Other notable stations that have begun operating in recent years include Channel 10, while TeleCity was renamed Tileasty. Other stations had upgraded and modernized, however, the Greek airwaves are still cluttered with many unlicensed television stations, often broadcasting low quality programs (infomercials, low budget movies, music videos, illegal telephone hotlines, soft pornography).

=== Status of broadcast licenses and the quasi-legal status ===
To this day, the Greek government still has not issued official licenses to most television stations in Greece, which are currently broadcasting in a quasi-legal state. Tenders have been offered for national, regional and local broadcasters as well as terrestrial pay-TV services, which have either been frozen or have failed completely. Despite numerous government pledges, there has not been much movement on this issue in recent years. In the meantime, the airwaves are still cluttered, though things are significantly more organized than they were in the early 1990s. Despite the success of Nova, and the launch of Hellas Sat, cable television has been slow to follow, only existing on a local level in some communities around Greece until recently, when companies such as OnTelecoms have launched cable (IPTV) platforms.

=== Greek debt crisis, budget cuts, and the closure of private broadcasters ===
By the early 2010s, most Greek television stations suffered the consequences of the country's debt crisis. In this decade two major Panhellenic stations ceased operations due to economic difficulties. Alter stopped its operation on 10 February 2012, after a history of more than 20 years.

Most channels cut their budget by decreasing their original programming (mostly their original series). Except for the high number of reruns, networks started airing a lot of foreign programs, the majority of them being Turkish dramas.

=== The beginning of HD broadcasting and the closure of ERT ===
On 27 April 2011, the first transmission of a high definition free-to-air channel was made by the state-owned ERT HD.

Two years later, on 11 June 2013, the Greek Government suspended the operations of the Hellenic Broadcasting Corporation (ERT) and automatically fired 2,656 employees, in one of the numerous spending cuts that had been implemented during Greek government-debt crisis. The plug was pulled at 23:10 during the news. On 11 June 2015, the new Government (made up of SYRIZA & ANEL parties) reinstated the operations of ERT by hiring back the personnel and broadcasting the three ERT channels ERT1, ERT2, ERT3.

=== The selling of 902 TV ===
On late 2013, 902 TV, owned by the Communist Party, was sold to a Cypriot-based company A-Orizon Media Ltd. On 11 September, of the same year, the channel was renamed Epsilon TV. After four years, the network once again sold, this time to Ivan Savides' company Dimera Media Investments Limited. On 24 August 2018, Epsilon TV was replaced by OPEN BEYOND.

=== The continuation of HD broadcasting and the closure of Mega ===
Since early 2016, most Panhellenic networks began pilot high definition transmissions to a limited number of cities.

By the end of the season, the channel Mega, the oldest privately owned national television station, stopped all live broadcasts, after a worker strike, due to its workers being unpaid for several months. The network continued broadcasting only reruns of old shows for more than two years, however, its ratings didn't hit the bottom. The network was forced to stop its transmission on 28 October 2018, at 02:08 am, after almost 3 decades from its launch. Viewers paid a tribute to the network at its final hours. Mega achieved a share of 17,5% (22,5% on 15–44 age group), one of the highest rating stations in the country at the time. By the end of 2019, Vaggelis Marinakis purchased the network's archives (programs, shows and footage) and logo.

=== Rebranding of ERT HD ===
On 9 February 2019, ERT renamed its HD channel into ERT Sports HD. Now its programs are aimed at sports.

=== Current networks ===
By the end of the decade, Greece had five national state-owned networks, four state-owned national digital television networks, a state-owned satellite broadcast network, and several national private television networks, in addition to approximately 150 local and regional television stations broadcasting across the country. Audience ratings were handled by AGB Hellas. The private networks were six, Ant1 (after Mega's closure the oldest), Alpha, Skai TV, Star Channel and OPEN BEYOND, operating from the Attica region and Makedonia TV operating from Thessaloniki.

=== The reopening of Mega ===
The 2020s show the reopening of the Mega Channel. After Vaggelis Marinakis' purchase of the channel's archive, he managed to relaunch Mega, under the same name and with a similar format (a combination of news programs, movies and Mega's old Greek TV shows). The network resumed broadcasting on 17 February 2020.

== Digital terrestrial television ==
In 2005, Alpha TV briefly ran experimental broadcasts in DVB-T locally in Athens, while in Heraklion, Crete, a regional network, CreteTV, in conjunction with the University of Crete, also started digital broadcasts.

In January 2006, the state broadcaster ERT launched free-to-air digital terrestrial television (DVB-T) channels with three "pilot" channels called Prisma+, Cine+ and Sport+, collectively branded as ERT Digital. The first channel, was targeted at disabled persons, while Cine+ broadcasts movies, and Sport+ broadcasts a sports program. A fourth channel, the Cypriot national channel's satellite program RIK sat, was also retransmitted on digital.

In September 2009, the seven major television stations in Greece started broadcasting in DVB-T MPEG-4, via a company set up by them, Digea. The digital television transition was completed in February 2015 and a total of 156 digital transmitting centres are currently active throughout the country, broadcasting nationwide and regional channels and covering over 96% of the country's population.

== Cable television ==
The first cable television operator in Greece is located at Kalamaria in Thessaloniki. Hellenic Cable Networks (www.hcn.gr) among cable internet services offers digital video broadcasting - cable and analog TV services without the need of an external STB.

== IPTV ==
In 2006, two companies began offering television service via IPTV, namely Vivodi Telecom and On Telecoms. Both of these went out of business.

They offered television service bundled with High-speed Internet & Telephony services. Their channel offerings included local Greek networks, international stations and pay-TV networks Nova Cinema & Nova Sports, that were made available to subscribers via an agreement with Greek DTH provider NOVA.

In 2009, Greek Telecommunications giant OTE launched IPTV service called Conn-x TV which was initially available in Athens, Thessaloniki, Patras, Larisa and Iraklion. Greek broadband provider Hellas Online also launched an IPTV platform called hol tv (now Vodafone TV). Vodafone TV offers all major Greek TV networks as well as news, sports, music and children's channels. It is also the first provider in Greece to offer HDTV as well as Video on demand.

== Most viewed channels ==
Most viewed channels, 30 June-6 July 2025

Position	Channel	Share of total viewing (%)
1	Mega	15.6
2	Alpha TV	12.3
3	ANT1	10.7
4	Skai TV	9.2
5	Star	8.7
6	Open TV	6.0
7	ERT1	4.0
8	Makedonia TV	2.6
9	ERT3	1.9
10	ERT2	1.4

== See also ==
- List of Greek television series
- List of Greek-language television channels
- "Prosopa" Greek Television Awards
