= ERT A =

First ERT radio multiplex

ERT A is the first multiplexer of ERT and started broadcasting in March 2006 by ERT Digital. The first digital terrestrial television of its kind in Greece started through this multiplexer. Today it covers 80% of the country's population.

During 2006-2011, it broadcast its channels exclusively on the DVB-T / MPEG-2 system. In the beginning, it included only the three channels of the former ERT Digital (Cine+, Sport+ and Prisma+) and the satellite channel of the Cypriot Public Radio and Television (RIK Sat).

Due to a capacity problem, on April 27, 2011, Cine+ and Sport+ channels merged, creating Cinesport+, in place of Sport+, while in place of Cine+, the Parliament channel was transferred from the first multiplexer in the second, to give space to the first to broadcast ERT HD.

After the final closure of ERT Digital, on March 19, 2012, the following redistributions took place: in place of Cinesport+ and Prisma+, BBC World News from UK and Deutsche Welle respectively started broadcasting. Along the way, the French TV5 Monde Europe was added. The other two (Vouli and RIK) remained as they were, until June 11, 2013, when ERT was closed by a government decision.

As of June 11, 2015, when ERT reopened, it broadcast the four aforementioned satellite channels and three of the public radio stations (First Programme, Kosmos 93.6 and Third Programme) which were the same radio stations as the current first multiplexer. From May 2019, ERT changed the transmission standard, also on satellite channels, and adopted the DVB-T / MPEG-4 standard, resulting in the permanent abolition of DVB-T / MPEG-2, which in the present times, is quite old technology. It also stopped broadcasting permanently the 3 nationwide public radio stations.

From 1 December 2020, in the first multiplexer, the two public channels ERT2 and ERT3 (ERT1, broadcasts nationwide in the second multiplexer) and the satellite television stations, including Deutsche Welle which broadcast until 3 March 2022 to be replaced by the thematic channel ERT News are broadcast in High Definition 1080i resolution.

- ERT1 SD (ERT1.)
- ERT2 Sport HD
- ERT3 HD
- ERT News SD
- RIK Sat
- TV5Monde Europe
- BBC News (International Feed)

== See also ==
- ERT
- ERT Digital
- ERT B
