= ERT B =

Greek television transmitter, the second ERT multiplex

ERT B (formerly the second multiplexer of ERT Digital) is the second multiplexer of ERT. It started broadcasting in 2010. During 2010-2011, it broadcast its channels exclusively on the DVB-T / MPEG-4 system. In the beginning, it included only the then three main channels of ERT (ET1, NET and ET3) and the Parliament channel.

Due to a capacity problem, on April 27, 2011, the Parliament channel was moved from the first multiplexer to the second, to give space to the first to broadcast ERT HD, until June 11, 2013, when ERT was closed by a government decision.

As of June 11, 2015, when ERT reopened, it broadcasts only the following: four new public main channels (ERT1, ERT2, ERT3 and ERT HD) while the Parliament channel returned, respectively, from the second multiplexer to the first.

As of February 1, 2019, ERT B, covers 98% of the country's population, from 156 broadcasting centers, which were previously covered in many parts of the country through the 4th frequency of Digea, due to the absence of transponders. On February 9, 2019, ERT HD was renamed ERT Sports HD, which continued to be broadcast in High Definition 1080i resolution, and respectively, all sports events, of public television, were transferred to the station program.

Its channels are broadcast exclusively on MPEG-4, except for ERT1 HD, which on December 1, 2020, replaced ERT Sports, which was broadcast in High Definition 1080i resolution, while until the end of 2021, ERT will broadcast from 200 broadcasting centers.

It broadcasts only the three main public television stations of ERT S.A., the television station of the Hellenic Parliament, as well as five public radio stations, the worldwide Voice of Greece, Zeppelin 106.7 and the thematic web radios Deftero Laika, Deftero Paradosiaka, Trito Maestro and Kosmos Jazz.

- ERT1
- ERT2 Sport
- ERT3
- ERT News HD
- ERT1 HD
- Vouli Tileorasi
- First Programme
- Second Programme
- Deftero Laika (web radio)
- Deftero Paradosiaka (web radio)
- Third Programme
- Trito Maestro (web radio)
- ERA Sport
- Voice of Greece
- Kosmos 93.6
- Kosmos Jazz (web radio)
- Zeppelin 106.7

== See also ==
- ERT
- ERT Digital
- ERT A
