= Rika Vagiani =

Greek actress (1962–2018)

- Born: Marika Zoula (Μαρίκα Ζούλα); March 4, 1962; Pangrati, Athens, Greece
- Died: August 7, 2018 (aged 56)
- Occupations: Actress, journalist, politician, editor
- Years active: 1979–2018

Rika Vagiani, artist name for Marika Zoula (Greek: Μαρίκα Ζούλα; 1962 – 7 August 2018), was a Greek actress, journalist, politician, editor of magazines and children's book writer.

She was born in Athens district of Pangrati from journalist Odysseas Zoulas and Varvara Drakou. Her career as actress began on 1979 and graduated from National Theatre of Greece Drama School on 1982. Soon she started to work as editor-in-chief in the magazines Cosmopolitan and Colt, and the newspapers Apogevmatini and Ethnos as a daily columnist.

She began presenting on TV in shows on Mega Channel, Star, Seven X, Channel X and ERT, such as Panta n' antamonoume. She co-founded the news site Protagon, where she published two children's books. In 1986, she began presenting on television, featuring in shows on Mega, Star, Seven X, Channel 5 and, since 1997, with the state broadcaster ERT, which she has remained until 2012. She also contributed to the Protagon website and penned two children's books.

Her artistic name "Rika Vagiani" came from the first syllable of the name of Barbara's mother "Va-" and the name of Yiannis Diakoyiannis' father-yanis. Her husband was Nikos Stefanis, with whom she had a son, Odysseus. She died on 7 August 2018 of lung cancer.

== Filmography ==
=== Television ===
Year	Title	Role(s)	Notes
1982-1983	The company	Julia	Lead role, 13 episodes
1983-1984	The Minor of Dawn	Stella	Lead role, 27 episodes
1986-1987	If I can remember	Herself (host)	Game show on ERT2
1990-1991	The main advocate	Ismini	Lead role, 18 episodes
1990-1992	Mega Star	Herself (host)	Sunday talk show on MEGA
1992	Studio 5	Herself (host)	Daytime morning talk show on MEGA
1992	Ah Eleni!	Eleni's neighbor	1 episode
1992	Popular and Light	Herself (host)	TV special
1992-1994	Morning Window	Herself (host)	Daytime morning talk show on MEGA
1994	Mother is only one	Aleka Marianou	Episode: "Mary as a MEP"
1994-1995	Never isn't... with Rika Vagiani	Herself (host)	Late night talk show on STAR
1995-1996	Night with Rika Vagiani	Herself (host)	Late night talk show on STAR
1996-1997	Quiet time with Rika Vagiani	Herself (host)	Daytime talk show on Channel 5
1997	They and I	Toula	Episode: "My child's child"
1997-1998	Ladies and gentlemen with Rika Vagiani	Herself (host)	Daytime talk show on NET
1999-2002	Sweet life with Rika Vagiani	Herself (host)	Daytime morning talk show on ET1
2000	You'll not destroy my house		1 episode
2002-2004	10-2	Herself (host)	Daytime morning talk show on ET1
2004-2005	P-R	Herself (host)	Talk show on NET
2005	The Nanny	journalist	1 episode
2007	Broken red eggs	Herself (host)	TV special
2007-2008	Loft with Rika Vagiani	Herself (host)	Saturday talk show on NET
2008	Unicef Telethon 2008	Herself (host)	TV special
2008-2011	We have to talk	Herself (host)	Daytime morning talk show ON ET1
2009	Unicef Telethon 2009	Herself (host)	TV special
2010	Eurovision Song Contest - Greek Finals	Herself (host)	TV special
2010	Greece in the Eurovision Song Contest	Herself (commentator)	TV special
2014	May we always meet again	Herself (host)	Saturday talk show on Public Television

=== Film ===
Year	Title	Role	Notes	Ref.
1986	Come kiss and go	Mema	Film debut	
1986	Tricky Girl	Dora	video movie	
1987	A dream of a left night	Aphrodite		
1987	Green blue and red nuts	Roula	video movie	
1987	Your death, my life	Jenny Kokkinomichalou	video movie	
1987	Chantiri Town	Denny's daughter	video movie	
1987	The last policeman	Dora	video movie	
1988	You had to be careful, Andreas!	Anna	video movie	
1988	Marry me no matter what...	Anna	video movie	
1988	John Remoulas, the psychic		video movie	
1988	Petaloudas goes to heaven		video movie	
1989	Nana the unreached	Nana	video movie	
1995	Transito			
1997	The scent of time	reporter		
2001	Pink at full speed			
2001	Stakaman	-	writer	
2008	Minor crime	awards presenter		
