= Alpha Digital =

Greek satellite television platform

Alpha Digital Synthesis
- Industry: Telecommunication
- Founded: April 1999
- Headquarters: Athens, Greece
- Area served: Greece
- Key people: Stathis Tsotsoros (Chief executive officer)
- Products: Satellite television
- Number of employees: 220

Alpha Digital is a Greek former digital satellite pay TV platform owned by Alpha Digital Synthesis SA. Commissioned by Alpha TV and executive director Stathis Tsotsoros, the platform was launched on October 29, 2001 and shut down around a year later, September 11, 2002, due to financial difficulties and a low number of 40.000 subscribers. It was also funded by the Alexander S. Onassis Foundation.

== History ==
In 1999, Alpha TV was considering a co-operation with ERT and OTE to launch a digital platform. Despite such plans being approved by the management boards of the said companies in March 2000, they were abandoned in September of the same year, as soon as OTE, which had soft launched a package of channels on Hot Bird, left the project; the said package would continue transmitting, featuring international themed channels, which were gradually replaced with Greek local ones.

Alpha Digital Synthesis was founded in April 1999. On November 28, 2000, broadcast licenses were first given to Alpha Digital Synthesis, regarding the then-upcoming platform, for its featured stations be later transmitted through satellites Eutelsat 16B and Hot Bird 1. Conditional access system Viaccess PC2.4 was used by Sagem, in manufacturing the decoders. In early 2001, Alpha Digital Synthesis would first launch on Hot Bird test cards for its then-upcoming original channels, plus the free-to-air channels Alpha TV, Polis and Vouli Tileorasi, as well as the radio stations Alpha News (now Alpha 98.9), Polis 88.6 FM (now Kids Radio 88.6), Alpha Sports 107.4 FM (now Music 89.2) and Gold 103.3 (now Sport24 Radio).

Prior its launch, football clubs would be offered 24 billion drachmas in total, to abandon rival platform Nova in favor of Alpha Digital. As a result, P.A.O.K., Panathinaikos, Panachaiki, Panionios, Proodeftiki, PAS Giannina, A.E.K., Olympiacos, Aris, Xanthi, Ethnikos Asteras, Kavala, Panserraikos, Kassandra, Olympiacos Volos, Fostiras, Panegialios, Atromitos and Apollon Pontus signed up 3-to-5 year contracts. NetMed, the parent firm of NOVA, would initially accuse Alpha Digital Synthesis of lying to its viewers, claiming that the contracts made with NOVA hadn't expired yet. AEK on the other hand, sued NetMed because of the terms of the agreement made between the two in summer 2001, which the football club itself decided to cancel. Following the closure of the platform, the latter four clubs were sued by Alpha TV, regarding the agreements made.

The platform started operating commercially on December 1, 2001. In four months, it surpassed a total of 35.000 subscribers. One of the channels featured, PAOK Channel, which would operate daily from 5pm, was the first Greek Football Club channel. Alpha TV bought the rights to Nickelodeon cartoons, to be broadcast on a block on Alpha Cinema 1, which would later become a 12-hour station on its own; sister stations Alpha TV and Channel 9 would later also broadcast these cartoons, thus gaining popularity in the latter. The European feeds of MTV and VH1 were added on the platform on July 1, 2002. Nine days later, a party was held on the New York Summer Club, over the Peace and Friendship Stadium, celebrating that addition.

After the closure of the platform, subscribers would be offered by the owner company to become NOVA subscribers, by distributing free software for installation on the Alpha Digital decoders. 220 employees were fired and also got a refund, with a few others attending Alpha TV's radio counterpart. All of Alpha Digital's channels had stopped transmitting on October 9, 2002. Shareholders of Alpha Digital would become shareholders of NetMed. There was also the prospect of Alpha Digital Synthesis (which was now managed by the Onassis Foundation, as a result of an agreement in exchange for its departure from the channel's owner) merging with NetMed. The decision of the Competition Committee on Alpha Digital and NetMed NV's shareholding co-operation was delayed by two hours and consequently, the latter denied any co-operation with Alpha Digital. The National Television Council recalled the broadcasting license on October 22, 2002.

In August 2008, prosecution to the degree of felony was done by the Public Prosecutor's Office of First Instance Court, following an order by the Public Prosecutor's Office of Appeals, against Dimitris Kontominas and other people sued by Stathis Tsotsoros, regarding the case of transfer of 25% shares from the Onassis Foundation to George Psarras, a close partner of Dimitris Kontominas. The losses from Alpha Digital Synthesis's involvement in pay-TV were estimated to be in 2008, about €185 million, along with liabilities of €26 million.

=== Channels ===
Original channels that were expected to broadcast included Alpha Life, Alpha News, Alpha Classic, Alpha Documentaries and Alpha Cinema 2.

- Alpha Sports 1
- Alpha Sports 2
- Alpha Cinema 1
- Alpha Digital Promo
- Turner Classic Movies
- CNBC
- CLUB
- Avante
- Spice
- Private Blue
- Private Gold
- Reality
- Adventure One
- National Geographic
- Alpha Kids
- Cartoon Network
- MTV
- VH1
- Alpha TV
- Alpha International
- Polis
- Channel 5
- Magna
- Playboy
- PAOK Channel
- Extreme Sports Channel
- CNN
- Vouli Tileorasi
- Magic TV
