= ERT Cosmos =

- Country: Greece
- Broadcast area: Europe; North America; North Africa; Australia; New Zealand; Middle East; Cyprus; Africa; Asia
- Headquarters: Broadcasting House (Athens), Greece

Programming
- Language: Greek
- Picture format: 576i (16:9 SDTV)

Ownership
- Owner: ERT
- Sister channels: ERT1; ERT2 Sport; ERT3; ERT News

History
- Launched: 1996; 3 May 2016 (relaunch)
- Former names: ERT Sat (1996–2006); ERT World (2006–2026)

Links
- Website: ERT Cosmos

Availability

Terrestrial
- Digital terrestrial television in Greece: ERT B multiplex
- Cyprus DTV (FTA): All over Cyprus in local frequencies

Streaming media
- ERTflix: Watch live

ERT Cosmos (formerly ERT SAT and later ERT World) is a Greek free-to-air television channel owned and operated by state-owned public broadcaster Hellenic Broadcasting Corporation (Greek: EPT – Ελληνική Ραδιοφωνία Τηλεόραση). It is the corporation's international television service, and its programming includes a mix of news, discussion-based programmes, drama, documentaries, entertainment shows as well as sports coverage including live games from Greece's top football league, Super League Greece.

As of June 12, 2013, it was disestablished under an order of the Greek Government, as part of austerity measures, along with all of ERT's former TV and radio channels; ET1, NET, ET3, ERT World and the radio stations ceased to operate from the morning of Wednesday 12 June. As of 3 May 2016, ERT world broadcasts again to Europe; since 2021, international distribution increased again.

== History ==
In early 2006, the Hellenic Broadcasting Corporation revealed that ERT SAT would be undergoing a major overhaul to allow it to better meet the needs of Greeks abroad. Among the changes are new programmes designed specifically for the Omogeneia (Greek expatriates) and a localized schedule to serve each of the newly designated program 'zones' - North America, Europe/Africa and Asia/Australia. The new program zones were to be launched in the fall of 2006 but as of March 2013 had yet to materialize as the channel still aired programs according to local time in Greece (UTC+2).

The channel shut down alongside the ERT crisis on 12 June 2013; DStv automatically removed the channel. Plans to relaunch the channel were put into place in February 2016.

On 7 May 2026, the channel was renamed ERT Cosmos and launched terrestrially on ERT's multiplex. Its launch caused BBC News to be displaced from the multiplex and into the ERTflix platform. The move was needed in order to cater to a segment of the Greek diaspora that spoke English more; most programs are now subtitled in English, though generated with AI tools.

== Distribution ==
In August 2010, ERT announced that they had initiated a public bidding process to award the worldwide distribution rights for ERT World. The current rights holder, Comart Telecom declined to renew their agreement with ERT and on August 30, 2010, it was announced that PCCW Global would be awarded the distribution rights temporarily for 1 year until the bidding process was completed and a decision made on the rights holder.

As of March 2013, the distribution rights are held by KBI Implus Hellas. On 11 June 2013, the channel and all the channels of the ERT group were brutally cut shortly before 11 pm (local time). If the terrestrial channels (ERT1, ERT2 and ERT3) resume their broadcasts on 11 June 2015, it is still almost a year before the satellite version of Greek public television resumes broadcasting on the Hot Bird satellite on 3 May 2016 in Europe.

== Programming ==
ERT World created a special program consisting of the best programmes from the three national channels, ERT1, ERT2 and ERT3, and its own specialized programs targeted at the global promotion of Greece. It also used to air programs from Cyprus Broadcasting Corporation (the Cypriot public broadcaster) but discontinued the practice.

Programming is split into two zones - weekday and weekend. On weekdays one can find standard news and information as well as some entertainment shows. On the weekend the focus is mainly on entertainment and sports.

=== Original ERT World programming ===
- Apo Tin Australia Me Agapi - weekly magazine, features news and stories about the Greek diaspora in Australia. Hosted by Alekos Markellos & Emma Emmanuel.
- Odysseia (Odyssey) - new program created specifically for ERT World, deals with the Omogenia. Features community news from various Greek communities around the world, issues regarding the initiatives and events of the diaspora, problems facing those living abroad regarding connecting with the homeland and live reports from cities and communities of the Greek diaspora. Hosted by Dora Anagnostopoulou.
- Elliniko Panorama (Hellenic Panorama) - newsmagazine designed specifically for viewers of ERT World that aims to present to viewers the face of Hellenism. A look at the new generation and how they are shaping the Greece of tomorrow, discussion with Hellenes abroad and reports on key individuals. Now in its 4th year, hosted by Irini Nikolopoulou.
- NEWS4U - daily English language news bulletin.
- Tekmiria Ellinismou - documentary series.

=== From former ET3 ===
- Αlithina Senaria - informative series that takes the viewer around the world to meet people who excel in their respective jobs. From a businessman on Wall Street to a shepherd in Pindos, from an acclaimed journalist to a hermit in Pilios, these are fascinating people with a story to tell. This program is now in its ninth year and has been the most watched show on ET-3 since its inception. It is hosted by Nikos Aslanidis.
- Anikhnéfsis - news magazine with a focus on the Balkan region and the countries that comprise it. It gives an in-depth look at the culture, history and people of this region. Hosted by Pantelis Savvidis.
- Diaspora - a series that focuses on bridging the gap between Greeks living abroad and Greece. It gives a voice to the homogeneity, to tell about their way of life, the problems they face, stories about their experiences and more. This show that will inform and entertain viewers the world around is hosted by Xrusa Samou.

== Logos ==
Original ERT Sat logo, 1996-2000

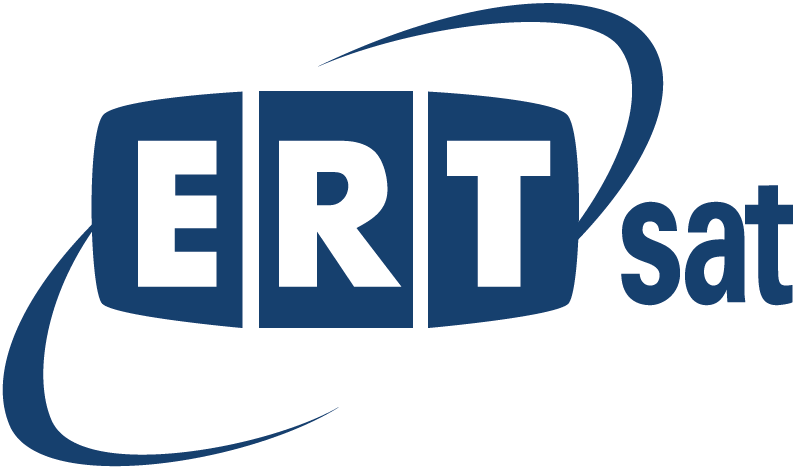
ERT Sat logo used from 2000 to 2006

ERT Sat logo (2006)

ERT World logo used from 2008–2013 and again since its re-launching in 2016. This logo changed the new look from 2008.

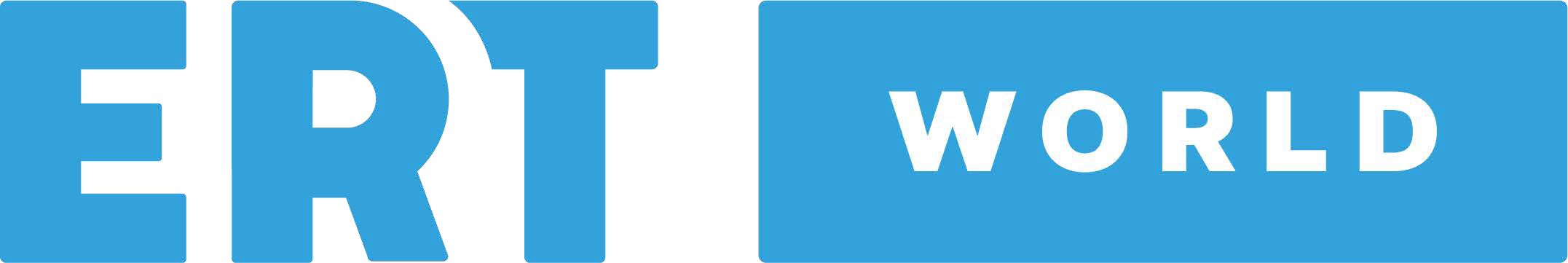
ERT World logo, in use from the 28th of September 2020, to May 6th 2026, following ERT's recent rebranding.

The logo of ERT Cosmos, uses since May 7th of 2026.

== See also ==
- ERT World Canada
- Cyprus Broadcasting Corporation
