= Panta n' antamonoume =

- Genre: variety music
- Presented by: Thanasis Alevras; Rika Vagiani
- Country of origin: Greece
- Original language: Greek
- No. of seasons: 1

Production
- Running time: 105 minutes

Original release
- Network: N1
- Release: 10 May 2014 – 6 June 2015

Panta n' antamonoume (English: We'll Always Be Meeting) is a Greek variety music television series airs on N1 on 10 May 2014 every Saturday at 8.15pm, It's hosted by Thanasis Alevras and Rika Vagiani.
