= 95.8 FM (Greece) =

Thessaloniki; Greece
- Broadcast area: Macedonia (Greece)
- Frequencies: Hortiatis: 95.8 FM; MW: 1.179 AM

Ownership
- Owner: ERT3

History
- First air date: February 1994

Links
- Website: www.ertecho.gr/radio/958fm/

95.8 FM is the second programme of the ERT3 radio service.

== History ==
The station commenced its operation in February 1994, with the encouragement of then Minister of Culture Melina Mercouri, succeeding the local ERT1 (former EIRT) radio station which was broadcast only on medium wave before being broadcast on 95.8 FM from 1994 with a cultural and recreational orientation.

In August 2011, the Papandreou government decided to merge the -then- three ERT3 radio stations (102 FM, 95.8 & Trito Programma Vrahea). This is something that was eventually averted, following negative reactions.

Following ERT's shutdown in June 2013, it ceased broadcasting. It resumed broadcasting on June 11, 2015. Until August 30, 2015, it broadcast the same programmes on 102 FM.
