= Dimosia Tileorasi =

Dimosia Tileorasi (Public Television) Δημόσια Τηλεόραση
- Type: Broadcaster (Television, Radio & Online)
- Country: Greece
- Founded: 10 July 2013
- Headquarters: Mesogeion 136 & Katechaki Avenue, Athens, Greece
- Broadcast area: Greece
- Owner: Publicly owned
- Key people: Prokopis Dukas, Fanis Papathanasiou, Antrianna Paraskevopoulos, Denia Sarakinis and Stavroula Christofili
- Launch date: 10 July 2013
- Dissolved: 4 May 2014
- Digital channel: Channel 52, 23
- Analogue channel: Channel 49, 41
- Picture format: 576i 16:9 (SDTV); 1080p 16:9 (HDTV)
- Official website: Official Site (closed)
- Replaced: ERT
- Replaced by: NERIT

Public Television (DT) (originally as Greek Public Television (EDT)) was a temporary, state television broadcaster in Greece (up to the creation of the new public channels of NERIT). From 27 January 2014, the management of the DT has gone to the Board of NERIT, to operate the new, permanent broadcaster.

== Creation of the broadcaster ==
In the morning of 10 July, DT started broadcasting on the television frequencies of ERT. The Deputy Broadcasting Minister Pantelis Kapsis in the same day, talked at a well known private TV station (from the old studios of Mega Channel in Paiania), pointed out that it was a matter of hours before of the start of broadcasting regular program and that the EDT would be broadcasting from a private studio. Indeed, at 9pm the EDT premiered by the Greek film I Kiria Dimarhos (The Lady Mayor). The TV was later renamed from EDT to DT. DT ended its broadcasts on May 4, 2014, transforming into NERIT.

== Dimosia Radiofonia ==
On 26 September 2013 in the morning, the Hellenic Public Radio Broadcasting Company (Elliniki Dimosia Radiofonia) starts live broadcasting with a single radio programme called Πρώτο Πρόγραμμα (Proto Programma - The First Programme) in several public radio frequencies. Additionally, www.hprt.gr was launched, as the official website of Hellenic Public Radio Television. The Proto eventually, along with Trito, transformed into NERIT Proto and NERIT Trito, respectively.

On 10 March 2014, at 7 a.m., the Hellenic Public Radio Broadcasting Company (Elliniki Dimosia Radiofonia) started live broadcasting of a second radio programme called Τρίτο Πρόγραμμα (Trito Programma - The Third Programme) along with Πρώτο Πρόγραμμα (Proto Programma - The First Programme). The Trito eventually, along with Proto, transformed into NERIT Trito and NERIT Proto, respectively.

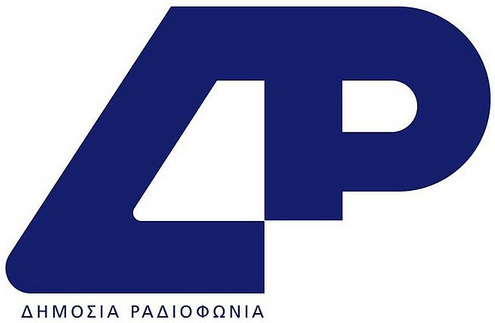
Dimósia Radiofonía logo

== Shows ==
Shows that were broadcast by the DT are:

- 4Greece
- Art Beat
- Morning News (Πρωινή Ενημέρωση - Proini Enimerosi)
- News (Επικαιρότητα - Epikerotita)
- News - Sports - Bull in the Sign - Weather (Ειδήσεις - Αθλητικά - Δελτίο στη Νοηματική - Καιρός - Eidiseis - Athlitika - Deltio sti Noimatiki - Kairos)
- The Road to the World Cup (Ο Δρόμος προς το Μουντιάλ - O Dromos pros to Mundial)
- In Focus

== DT HD ==
From June, the high definition simulcast of DT started broadcasting, temporarily replacing Vouli Tileorasi. The channel is the successor of ERT HD, which was one of the biggest achievements that ERT made, which already started HD broadcasts in 2011. It brought a free-to-air Greek high definition channel, while foreign networks almost exclusively broadcast in high definition, since their home countries already broadcast in high definition before. The channel has also been added to the satellite platforms Nova (channel 101) and OTE TV (channel 103).
