= Cine+ =

Cine+ may refer to:

- Ciné+, set of cable and satellite television channels owned by Canal+
- Cine+, a digital terrestrial television station owned by ERT Digital
