= ERT3 (studio) =

Regional broadcasting center in Thessaloniki

Greece
- City: Thessaloniki

Ownership
- Owner: Hellenic Broadcasting Corporation

History
- Founded: 1988 (as a General Management of ERT Northern Greece); 1994 (as ERT3)

Links
- Website: ert.gr

ERT3 (Greek: Ελληνική Ραδιοφωνία Τηλεόραση 3) is a regional broadcasting center in Thessaloniki that belongs to the Hellenic Broadcasting Corporation (ERT), the public service broadcaster in Greece. It provides radio and television programming with Northern Greek perspectives.

== Services ==
Television channels

- ERT3 (Available nationwide)

Radio stations

- 102 FM
- 95.8 FM
- Trito Programma Vrahea (closed)
