= Pantelis Savvidis =

Greek journalist

Pantelis Savvidis (Greek: Παντελής Σαββίδης), (born 1954 in Axioupoli, Kilkis), is a Greek journalist, based in Thessaloniki, Greece. He is, thirteen years now, the host of the weekly talk-show Anichnefseis (Ανιχνεύσεις, Greek for explorations) on ERT3, for which he earned various prizes for the serious way of informing viewers on issues regarding the Balkans, international and European politics. He was, for two years (2005–07), the managing director of Makedonia, one of the oldest newspapers in Greece.
