= ERT Sports =

ERT Sports HD
- Country: Greece
- Broadcast area: National
- Headquarters: Broadcasting House

Programming
- Language(s): Greek
- Picture format: 1080i (HDTV)

Ownership
- Owner: ERT
- Sister channels: ERT1; ERT2; ERT3; ERT World

History
- Launched: 27 April 2011; 11 June 2015 (Relaunch); 9 February 2019 (as ERT Sports)
- Closed: 8 February 2019 (as ERT HD); 1 December 2020 (as ERT Sports)
- Replaced by: ERT1 HD

Links
- Website: ERT Sports HD

Availability

Streaming media
- ERTflix: Watch live

ERT Sports (Greek: ΕΡΤ Sports) was a Greek free-to-air television channel, owned by the Hellenic Broadcasting Corporation, the state broadcaster of Greece. It was the first high-definition television channel in the country and started broadcasting on 27 April 2011 in several large cities such as Athens, Thessaloniki and Alexandroupoli as ERT HD.

ERT HD broadcast such important international events as the Olympic Games, the UEFA European Championship and the Eurovision Song Contest. It broadcasts at 1080i frame, encoded at Advanced Video Coding on the DVB-T standard.

On 1 December 2020, ERT Sports was technically replaced on terrestrial television by ERT1 HD, while at the same time, HD broadcasts began in 80% of the country's population for ERT2 and ERT3. ERT Sports is currently broadcast only through the ERTFLIX platform, in three separate instances (ERT Sports, ERT Sports 2 and ERT Sports 3), to allow concurrent broadcasting of athletic events. Following ERT Sports' closure, ERT 1 is responsible for the broadcast of the French Open, the finals of the UEFA Champions League, UEFA Europa League and Formula One and ERT 3 for games of the Greek Basket League, the Basketball Champions League, the A1 Ethniki Volleyball and the Greek handball championship, as well as the Super League Greece 2. When two or more athletic events are scheduled for simultaneous or near simultaneous broadcast, both ERT 3 and ERT Sports channels are used; the ERT Sports channels do not broadcast other content otherwise. During the XXXII Olympiad, on certain days, all ERT channels, terrestrial and via the internet were utilized for the broadcast of athletic events.

== Lawsuit ==
The Greek private television channel Skai filed a lawsuit against the state broadcaster in 2011 for what it claimed was an illegal monopoly on high-definition programming by the public broadcaster. In its lawsuit, Skai claimed that ERT was in violation of European Union regulations regarding competition.

== Logos ==
27/04/2011 - 11/06/2013

11/06/2015 - 09/02/2019

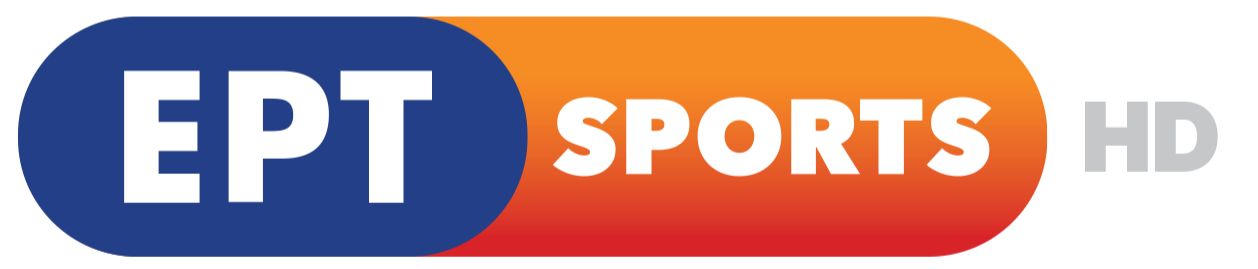
09/02/2019 - 28/09/2020

28/09/2020 - 1/12/2020

== See also ==
- ERT
- ERT1
- ERT2
- ERT3
- ERT News
