= Nova Life =

Greek satellite television channel

Novalife
- Country: Greece

Programming
- Language: Greek
- Picture format: 1080i (HDTV)

Ownership
- Owner: Nova
- Sister channels: Novasports; Novacinema

History
- Launched: May 13, 2013

Links
- Website: Official website

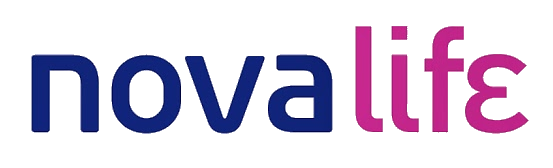
Old logo (2014-2021)

Novalife is a Greek satellite television channel owned by Nova, who own and operate a DTH satellite service with the same name. It was launched on May 13, 2013, and it features series, movies, talk shows, shows with showbiz news, making of, deleted scenes and backstage. It also broadcasts hit series from its sister channel Novacinema, and formerly a kids zone named Nova Kids.

On August 1, 2016, it started broadcasting in HD.

In Cyprus it is available to the subscribers of Nova Cyprus and CytaVision.

== Programmes ==
=== Current programming ===
- The Ellen DeGeneres Show, a talk show
- The Bachelor, a reality television dating game show
- The Bachelorette, a reality television dating game show
- America's Got Talent, a talent show
- Britain's Got Talent, a talent show
- American Idol, a talent show
- Fitness Time, a show about yoga, pilates, meditation, health & spiritual well-being

=== Former programming ===
- Lampater, a talk show
- Life Time, a show-biz news show, hosted by Dimitri Kouroumpali and Κaterina Geronikoloy
- Fashion and The City, a show about fashion news, architecture, interior design, fashion design etc.
- One World Kitchen, a cook show
- RealTalk, a talk show, hosted by Katerina Laspa
- Gran Hotel
- Rome
- Police Woman
- Hart to Hart
- Charlie's Angels
- Bewitched
- Dharma & Greg
- Magic City
- Velvet
