= Music Force Europe =

Greek music channel

Music Force Europe is a music channel based in Greece.

== History ==
Music Force Europe is a reincarnation of TVC, Greece's first 24-hour music channel. TVC (TV Chidira) began operating out in Lesbos back in 1993. In opposition to TMF and MTV Dance, it is not country-localized and depicts all the subgenres of electronic and dance music: trance, house, Italo disco, disco, eurohouse, progressive, dance, electro, breakbeat, chill out, drum and bass, Eurodance, garage, Eurobeat, uplifting, italo, lounge, techno, or old skool.
