= Nova Cinema (Greece) =

Greek pay television movie channel

Novacinema
- Country: Greece

Programming
- Language: Greek
- Picture format: 1080i (HDTV)

Ownership
- Owner: Nova
- Sister channels: Novasports; Nova Life

History
- Launched: 1994
- Former names: Filmnet (1994–2008)

Links
- Website: Official website

Novacinema is a pay television service available in Greece that broadcasts blockbuster movies and hit series. It is a 24/7 movie service and it launched in 1994. It is owned by Nova, who own and operate a DTH satellite service with the same name and Novasports—a sports channel.

In 2015, Nova Cinema has an output deal with HBO to broadcast the biggest hit series in Greece at the same time with the US. The fifth season of Game of Thrones premiered on 12 April 2015 on HBO and Nova Cinema at the same time.

Nova satellite subscribers have access to all four Novacinema channels if they subscribe to either the Cinema pack or the Full pack offered by the company.

== FilmNet ==
From 1994 until 1 June 2008, Nova Cinema was known as Filmnet which was one of the oldest names in European pay television history: Originally, service was launched in 1985 targeting Benelux and Scandinavia. In 1997, all Filmnet channels minus the one in Greece were sold to Groupe Canal+ and rebranded as Canal+. With the arrival of the Nova Cinema brand in 2008, the name Filmnet was retired.

== Channels and content ==
Nova Cinema operates four multiplex channels:

- NovaCinema 1 HD: features blockbusters and premieres, Greek co-productions from Nova, as well as movie awards.
- NovaCinema 2 HD: The channel showing movies.
- NovaCinema 3 HD: features adventure, crime, fantasy, sci-fi, horror and western movies and as well as adult zone every night.
- NovaCinema 4 HD: The series channel, features foreign series with new episodes, broadcast for the first time in Greece, shortly after America's air time.

=== Temporary channels ===
Nova occasionally uses channel slot 200 for a new channel to air different kinds of seasonal or promotional programming. Examples of this include:

- Nova Summer HD: Broadcast from 1 June until 31 August, featuring 2 movies every night at 9pm.
- Nova Christmas HD: Broadcast during the Christmas holidays as a seasonal channel featuring family and kids movies every night.
- Nova Stars HD: Broadcast during the whole January and February, featuring 2 awarded/nominated movies every night.
- Nova Star Wars: Broadcast from 4 May 2015 until 31 May 2015, featuring Star Wars full-time.
- Nova Harry Potter HD: Broadcast from 14 October 2017 until 29 October 2017, featuring Harry Potter and Fantastic Beasts full-time.
- Nova X-Men HD: Broadcast from 11 May 2018 until 28 May 2018, featuring X-Men full-time.
- Nova Thrones HD: Broadcast from 1 April 2019 until 31 May 2019, featuring Game of Thrones full-time.
- Nova Rock HD: Broadcast from 15 June 2019 until 31 July 2019, featuring 2 rock music movies every night.

=== Special Events ===
NovaCinema 1 HD features special events such as Golden Globe Awards, Screen Actors Guild Awards and BAFTA. It used to broadcast the Academy Awards until 2016 when Nova lost the exclusive rights to the coverage of the ceremony.

=== Current Hit Series ===
- Absentia
- Big Little Lies
- Blindspot
- Condor
- Four Weddings and a Funeral
- Gotham
- His Dark Materials
- Lethal Weapon
- Mrs. Fletcher
- NCIS
- Prodigal Son
- Silicon Valley
- Succession
- The Deuce
- The Good Doctor
- The Handmaid's Tale
- True Detective
- Watchmen
- Westworld

=== Former Hit Series ===
- Black Sails
- Boardwalk Empire
- Cedar Cove
- Counterpart
- CSI: Crime Scene Investigation
- Deadly Class
- Deception
- Divorce
- Game of Thrones
- Gomorrah
- Gran Hotel
- Hannibal
- Person of Interest
- Satisfaction
- Show Me a Hero
- The Art of More
- The Following
- The Leftovers
- The Mentalist
- The Newsroom
- Timeless
- Vinyl
- Whiskey Cavalier

== Logos ==
1994–2008

2008–2010

2010–2014

2014–2021
