= National Radio Foundation =

The National Radio Foundation (Greek: Εθνικό Ίδρυμα Ραδιοφωνίας, romanized: Ethnikó Ídryma Radiofonías) or EIR (Greek: ΕΙΡ), was the main public state broadcaster of Greece from 1945 until 1970.

The agency was founded in 1945, following liberation from the Axis occupation of Greece, as the successor of the occupation-era Radio Broadcasting Company Limited (AERE) (Note: Greek: Ανώνυμη Εταιρεία Ραδιοφωνικών Εκπομπών, romanized: Anónymi Etaireía Radiofonikón Ekpompón.) and the pre-war Radio Broadcast Service (YRE). (Note: Greek: Υπηρεσία Ραδιοφωνικών Εκπομπών, romanized: Ypiresía Radiofonikón Ekpompón.) EIR was one of 23 founding broadcasting organisations of the European Broadcasting Union in 1950. It started offering television services in 1966, the same year that the second public broadcaster, the military-run Armed Forces Television (TED), also began operations. In 1970 EIR became the National Radio Television Foundation (EIRT) until 1987, when it and ERT2, TED's successor, were amalgamated into the Hellenic Broadcasting Corporation (ERT).
