= New Hellenic Radio, Internet and Television =

Greek broadcasting company

New Hellenic Radio, Internet and Television Νέα Ελληνική Ραδιοφωνία, Ίντερνετ και Τηλεόραση
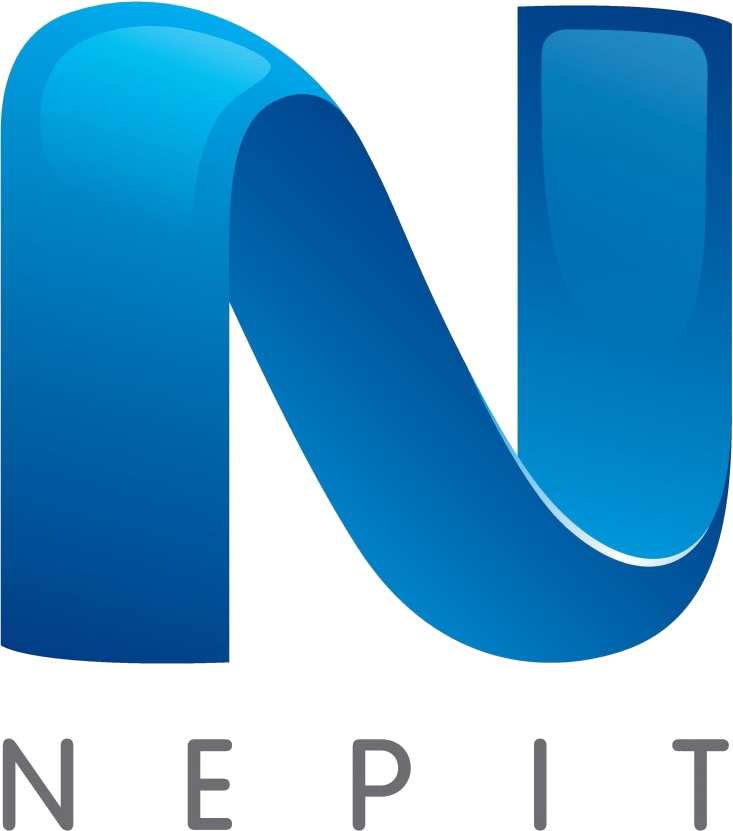
- Type: Public broadcasting network
- Country: Greece
- Headquarters: Broadcasting House (Mesogeion 432), Agia Paraskevi, Athens, Greece
- Broadcast area: Nationwide
- Owner: State-owned
- Key people: Petros Maes
- Launch date: 10 July 2013; 12 years ago
- Dissolved: 11 June 2015; 10 years ago
- Picture format: 576i 16:9 (SDTV); 1080p 16:9 (HDTV)
- Replaced: Hellenic Broadcasting Corporation (ERT) (1975–2013)
- Replaced by: Hellenic Broadcasting Corporation (ERT)

New Hellenic Radio, Internet and Television (Greek: Νέα Ελληνική Ραδιοφωνία, Ίντερνετ και Τηλεόραση, romanized: Néa Ellinikí Radiofonía, Ínternet kai Tileórasi) or NERIT (ΝΕΡΙΤ) was the state-owned public broadcaster for Greece from 4 May 2014 to 11 June 2015. Antonis Samaras' coalition government established NERIT to replace the Hellenic Broadcasting Corporation (ERT) in 2013: NERIT began broadcasting under their identity on 4 May 2014, replacing the transitional service Dimosia Tileorasi.

In 2015, the government (by then under Alexis Tsipras as Prime Minister) restored ERT as Greece's public broadcaster, and NERIT ceased broadcasting on 11 June 2015 (at 6:00 EEST).

== History ==
=== Background ===
On 11 June 2013, the Greek government announced its intention to close ERT, due to unfair recruitments over the past 30 years of previous governments' favors to persons without degrees and without passing the exams of ASEP with exchange of voting them eternally and with immediate effect and to open a new organization entitled NERIT (Νέα Ελληνική Ραδιοφωνία, Ίντερνετ, Τηλεόραση - Nea Elliniki Radiofonia, Internet, Tileorasi - New Hellenic Radio, Internet and Television) and built it from top to bottom, with employees with degrees and certifications of passing the exams of ASEP. That night, the government started to shut down every transmitter of ERT in Greece. Many employees refused to leave ERT's headquarters at the Broadcasting House in Agia Paraskevi and continued to broadcast an internet TV channel on Greek, Cypriot and other European media sites. A few days later, ERT's signal was restored on some analogue frequencies in Greece, broadcasting a strike programme from Agia Paraskevi. In the meantime, the president of PASOK, Evangelos Venizelos, blackmailed the prime minister that if he did not stop the closing of the Hellenic Broadcasting Corporation, he would immediately leave the coalition government, along with the president of the Democratic Left, Fotis Kouvelis and push the country into new elections, which meant another expenditure against the people and lack of stability in the country.

On 10 July 2013, after 28 days of black screens on ERT's digital channels, a transitional service started broadcasting on ERT frequencies as ΕΔΤ (Ελληνική Δημόσια Τηλεόραση - Elliniki Dimosia Tileorasi - Hellenic Public Television) from Paiania studios. A few hours later the broadcasting authority renamed the channel ΔΤ (Δημόσια Τηλεόραση - Dimosia Tileorasi - Public Television). ΔΤ, the transitional channel, transmitted old Greek movies and scientific, social and historical documentaries from ERT's archives. Βουλή Τηλεόραση (Vouli Tileorasi - Parliament Television) broadcasts sessions and documentaries from the Greek Parliament.

On 21 August 2013, ΔΤ started live broadcasting with "Πρωινή ενημέρωση" (Proini Enimerosi - The Morning News) from its Katehaki headquarters on several public frequencies. Sporting events such as the FIA Formula 1 World Championship and the UEFA Champions League were broadcast by ΔΤ (Δημόσια Τηλεόραση - Dimosia Tileorasi - Public Television) with commentaries from journalists. The broadcaster launched a redesigned logo for "ΔΤ".

On the morning of 26 September 2013, the Ελληνική Δημόσια Ραδιοφωνία (Elliniki Dimosia Radiofonia - Hellenic Public Radio Broadcasting) started live broadcasting with a programme called Πρώτο Πρόγραμμα (Proto Programma - First Programme) on several public frequencies. www.hprt.gr was launched as the official website of Hellenic Public Radio Television.

On 1 December 2013 ΔΤ stopped using the DIGEA platform. ΔΤ now broadcasts via the ex-ERT transmitters on three different frequencies: On the first (23 UHF from Athens), ΔΤ broadcasts 3 TV channels (ΔΤ1, ΔΤ HD, Vouli TV) and 3 Radio channels (ΔΡ1, ΔΡ2, ΔΡ3). ΔΤ1 is the main ΔΤ TV channel. The logo ΔΤ remained unchanged. ΔΤ HD (Dimosia Tileorasi High Definition) broadcast mainly the same as ΔΤ1 but in HD. The logo of ΔΤ HD is the same as ΔΤ with a small "HD" logo on the right-hand side of the screen. Technical details of ΔΤ HD: 1080i and Dolby Surround Digital Plus. ΔΡ1 and ΔΡ2 broadcast the same radio coverage, whilst ΔΡ3 later became a different channel. On the second frequency (37 UHF), ΔΤ broadcast 4 digital TV channels (ΕΔΤ, TV5 Europe, Nova Cinema 1 and Nova Sports-Disney XD). ΕΔΤ broadcast the same programme as ΔΤ1. On the third frequency (56 UHF from Thessaloniki), ΔΤ transmitted 4 TV channels (ΔΤ2, RIK, BBC and DW). ΔΤ2 broadcast exactly the same programme as ΔΤ1.

On Monday, 10 March 2014, at 7 a.m., the Ελληνική Δημόσια Ραδιοφωνία (Elliniki Dimosia Radiofonia - Hellenic Public Radio Broadcasting) began live broadcasting of a second radio channel called Τρίτο Πρόγραμμα (Trito Programma - Third Programme) along with Πρώτο Πρόγραμμα (Proto Programma - First Programme).

On Good Friday, 18 April 2014, ΔΤ2 broadcast a different TV programme to cover only the Basketball Euroleague play-off game between Panathinaikos B.C. and CSKA Moscow. The temporary logo of ΔΤ2 was the same as ΔΤ with a small "2" on the right-hand side.

=== NERIT launch ===
From Sunday, 4 May 2014, at 6 p.m. at the beginning of the evening news, the Hellenic Public Television changed its name and logo to NERIT Νέα Ελληνική Ραδιοφωνία, Ίντερνετ και Τηλεόραση Néa Ellinikí Radiofonía, Ínternet ke Tileórasi - New Hellenic Radio, Internet and Television with a single programme called "Nerit", which was broadcast in 3 TV channels (Ν1, Ν2 (NERIT Sports), Ν HD). The current logo of the N channel is the letter "N" displayed as a ribbon. Hellenic Public Radio has become "NERIT Radio" with three channels: First Programme (Proto), Third Programme (Trito) and Kosmos. Three more radio channels are planned. The new NERIT webpage (www.nerit.gr) replaced the Hellenic Public Radio Television website (www.hprt.gr). On 15 May 2014 the second NERIT channel began transmission as a sports programme called NERIT Sports. In January 2015 began the official second channel of NERIT, NERITplus (replaced ERT2), the Second Programme and the new radio NERIT Macedonia (102 FM).

== Services ==
=== Television channels ===
==== NERIT1 ====
NERIT1 (N ENA) was the first Greek public television channel of New Hellenic Radio, Internet and Television (NERIT), the successor of ERT. The public broadcaster chose not to display the number "1" next to the letter N, so the logo of the channel was the letter "N," but it was still known as NERIT1. On 11 June 2015, after the government's decision of reopening ERT, it was replaced by ERT1.

==== N Plus ====
N Plus logo

N Plus was the second public television channel of NERIT. The program consisted of varied programming and there were times when N1 was rebroadcast to fill in the hours when the program wasn't broadcast. In June 2015, the channel was replaced by ERT2.

==== N HD ====
N HD logo

N HD (NERIT HD) was the third public television channel of NERIT and transmitted a mix of the programs of N1 and N Plus in HDTV. Usually, it transmitted the program of N1 because it was more significant, in their view. There were big events which were broadcast like the Eurovision Song Contest. It transmitted the program of N Plus when the channel broadcast sports events. In June 2015, the channel was replaced by ERT HD.

==== N Sports ====
N Sports logo

NERIT Sports was a short-lived television channel of the Greek state owned public broadcaster New Hellenic Radio, Internet and Television. NERIT Sports began broadcasting on 18 May 2014. Originally only broadcasting during the day-time, the channel began broadcasting 10/6 one week before the World Cup. The channel was only broadcasting sports, with the occasional rebroadcast of the first programme of ERT2. The channel was broadcast nationwide from Athens, Greece.

On 31 December 2014, the channel was closed and replaced by the family channel NERITplus (now ERT2).

=== Radio stations ===
==== First Programme ====
First Programme was the first public radio channel of NERIT. The programme consisted of folk music, sports and news.

==== Second Programme ====
Second Programme was the second public radio channel of NERIT. The programme consisted of Greek music and culture broadcasts.

==== Third Programme ====
Third Programme was the third public radio channel of NERIT. The programme consisted of classical music, radio dramas and culture.

==== Kosmos ====
Kosmos was the fourth public radio channel of NERIT. The programme consisted of reggae, jazz, folk-ethnic and world music. Kosmos was earlier on air only in Athens, but under NERIT it went on air on the frequencies of the former ERA Kosmos in Athens, as well as in Thessaloniki. The station was expanded nationwide in a period of 2 weeks in July.

==== NERIT Macedonia (102 FM) ====
NERIT Macedonia (102 FM)

NERIT Macedonia (102 FM) (Greek: NΕΡIΤ Μακεδονίας (102 FM), NERIT Makedonias) was the fifth public radio channel of Greece's state broadcaster, ERT. The programme consisted of broadcasts about civilization of Macedonia, News, the regional music show Noah's World, and music blocks. The radio broadcast only in Greek Macedonia.

=== Internet ===
NERIT had one official website which informed people about the news from Greece but also from the world, science, culture, sports, etc. In addition there was information about the organization, press releases and competitions. The page organized a public consultation which sought views of citizens on issues concerning the organization and functioning of the body.

== Funding ==
NERIT's main source of income was a 3 euro surcharge from electricity pricing, supplemented by revenues from programme sponsorship and advertising.
