= ERT Digital =

- ERT Digital logo.
- Country: Greece
- Network: ERT

Programming
- Language(s): Greek

Ownership
- Owner: ERT

History
- Launched: 2006
- Closed: March 2012

ERT Digital (Greek: ΕΡΤ Ψηφιακή) was a pilot project by ERT, the public broadcaster of Greece. It was the first legal attempt at digital television broadcasting in Greece, featuring four new channels: Cine+, Prisma+ Sport+ and Info+. It was officially launched in early 2006 as part of the digital television transition mandated by the European Union. The project was funded through ERT's budget and had no advertising.

In the initial phase of the program, each channel was to broadcast between six and ten hours of original programming. This would last approximately 1–2 years in which time it was anticipated that new programming would be produced for each channel. ERT also hoped to launch at least two more digital channels at some point in the future, a lifestyle channel and a children's channel. The programming on the four digital channels was separate and distinct from that featured on ERT's three traditional analogue services - ΕΤ1, ΝΕΤ and ΕΤ3.

ERT Digital was available to approximately 65% of the population, mainly in Athens, Thessaloniki and some other major cities. It broadcast free-to-air without any subscription cost, requiring only a generic DVB-T set-top box. The issue of paying for the four digital channels had been a bone of contention for many Greek citizens as ERT was funded by a fee levied on all Greek households through their electricity bills. Some contended that they should not have to pay for a service they might not be able to receive or did not want to watch.

== RIK Sat ==
RIK Sat was also offered on the same frequency, accounting as the temporary fourth channel of the bouquet.
