= Digital terrestrial television in Cyprus =

Digital terrestrial television is the only means of watching terrestrial TV in Cyprus. The switch-over from analogue to digital TV was completed on 11 July 2011, in line with Cyprus's commitments as a European Union Member State. Transmission is on the DVB-T MPEG-4 standard and covers both standard and high definition channels (DVB-T MPEG-4 HD (1920 x 1080)). Currently there are two licensed platforms: CyBC and Vellister.
