= Novasports =

Greek sports pay television network

- Country: Greece

Programming
- Language: Greek
- Picture format: 1080i (HDTV)

Ownership
- Owner: Nova
- Sister channels: Novacinema; Novalife

History
- Launched: 1994
- Former names: SuperSport (1994–2008)

Links
- Website: www.novasports.gr

Novasports is a Greek sports pay television network owned by Nova, a subsidiary of Greek telecommunications company of the same name. It is available exclusively on Nova, a DTH satellite service. It is available terrestrially and via satellite only on Nova.

== SuperSport era ==
It was launched in 1994 as Supersport and at the time was the first premium sports service in Greece.

The SuperSport brand is still prevalent in South Africa as the name is used thereby DStv which is a satellite television provider owned by MultiChoice, the previous owners of Greece's SuperSport and Filmnet as well.

Some events shown on Nova Sports are still taken directly from SuperSport (South Africa) broadcast feeds, complete with SuperSport logos and on-screen promotions. These normally include Golf and Rugby Union matches, and occasionally result in the second audio feed, which usually broadcasts English alongside Greek, broadcasting commentary in Afrikaans.

On 1 June 2008, the Greek SuperSport changed its name to the current one, Novasports.

== Channels ==
Novasports operates fourteen (14) multiplex channels, all of which are of 1080i (HD) quality:

- Novasports News
- Novasports Start
- Novasports Prime
- Novasports 1
- Novasports 2
- Novasports 3
- Novasports 4
- Novasports 5
- Novasports 6
- Novasports Premier League
- Novasports Extra 1
- Novasports Extra 2
- Novasports Extra 3
- Novasports Extra 4

== Original programs ==
- Time of the Champions - Football show covering Super League Greece with news, interviews, statistical analysis and highlights (pre- and postgame).
- Playmakers - Basketball show covering EuroLeague Basketball with news, interviews, statistical analysis and highlights (pre- and postgame).
- Monday Football Club (Monday FC) - Football show covering the reviews and highlights of past weekend matches (Super League, Premier League, LaLiga, Bundesliga and Eredivisie). The program is being aired on Monday nights. When it is shown in different weekdays, it is called Novasports Football Club (Novasports FC).
- Novasports Challenge - Mini interviews with former legends (players and coaches) of the Greek football championship.
- Novasports Moments - Flashback moments from retro games of the Greek football championship that were left unattended in time.
- Kings of Europe - Mini tributes to important moments of the European national football championship.
- Novasports Exclusive - A documentary series with extended interviews of high profile players and coaches of Greek sport.

== Sports broadcasting rights ==
=== Association football ===
==== Club competitions ====
- Super League Greece
  - Home matches of PAOK FC
  - Home matches of Aris Thessaloniki F.C.
  - Home matches of Atromitos F.C.
  - Home matches of Asteras Tripolis F.C.
  - Home matches of Levadiakos F.C.
  - Home matches of Kalamata F.C.
- (England) Premier League (-2028)
- (Germany) Bundesliga (-2029)
- (Germany) 2. Bundesliga (-2029)
- (Germany) DFL-Supercup (-2028)
- (Italy) Coppa Italia (-2027)
- (Italy) Supercoppa Italiana (-2027)
- (Netherlands) Eredivisie
- (Brazil) Copa do Brasil

==== National team competitions ====
- (Europe) UEFA Nations League (2024–25 & 2026–27)
- Finalissima (-2028)

=== Basketball ===
- (Europe) EuroLeague (-2028)
- (Europe) EuroCup Basketball (-2028)

=== Tennis ===
- (United Kingdom) Wimbledon Championships
- WTA Finals
- WTA 1000
- WTA 500
- WTA 250
- Davis Cup

=== Golf ===
- (United States) Masters Tournament

=== Mixed martial arts (MMA) ===
- (Singapore) ONE Championship
