= National Radio Television Foundation =

The National Radio Television Foundation (Greek: Εθνικό Ίδρυμα Ραδιοφωνίας Τηλεοράσεως, romanized: Ethnikó Ídryma Radiofonías Tileoráseos) or EIRT (Greek: ΕΙΡΤ) was the Greek state broadcaster founded in 1970, during the junta. In 1975 it converted to ERT.

== History ==
The EIRT was the fourth state broadcasting organisation of Greece and the first state TV operator in Greece. The first broadcasting organisation of Greece was the Radio Broadcast Service (Υπηρεσία Ραδιοφωνικής Εκπομπής, Ypiresía Radiofonikís Ekpompís; ΥΡΕ/YRE), which was replaced by Radio Station Athens (Ραδιοφωνικός Σταθμός Αθηνών, Radiofonikós Stathmós Athinón; ΡΣΑ/RSA), founded by the 4th of August Regime of Ioannis Metaxas in 1938.

The second operator was Radio Broadcasting Anonymous Company (Ανώνυμη Εταιρεία Ραδιοφωνικών Εκπομπών, Anónymi Etaireía Radiofonikón Ekpompón; ΑΕΡΕ/AERE), again with Radio Station Athens, which was established during the Occupation. In 1945, the National Radio Foundation (Εθνικό Ίδρυμα Ραδιοφωνίας, Ethnikó Ídryma Radiofonías; ΕΙΡ/EIR) was founded by the Constituent Act 54/1945 "establishing the National Radio Foundation," whereby it became the owner of all the property of the former AERE.

== Establishment ==
On April 21, 1967, the military junta was imposed and assumed command of the EIR and TED (later YENED). Georgios Papadopoulos wanted to create a second public broadcaster in order to strengthen the propaganda of the dictatorship. The EIR facilities in Zappeio were insufficient, and in the period from 1968 to 1969, the Broadcasting House in Athens was constructed. It was inaugurated in 1970, and on 10 December that same year, the Papadopoulos government junta established the National Radio-Television Foundation with the now permanent television station of the former EIR and the First, Second and Third Radio Programmes.

== Role ==
The role of EIRT was to broadcast information nationwide and to entertain the Greek people.

== After the junta: succession ==
After the fall of the junta, Constantine Karamanlis returned to EIRT. It continued its normal course until being replaced by the Hellenic Broadcasting Corporation on 3 December 1975.
