= Nova (Greece) =

Greek telecommunications and media company

- Type: Subsidiary
- Industry: Telecommunications
- Founded: 1995; 31 years ago
- Founder: Foundation for Research & Technology – Hellas; Minoan Lines
- Headquarters: Athens, Greece
- Area served: Greece and Cyprus
- Key people: Nikos Stathopoulos (Chairman); Panagiotis Georgiopoulos (CEO)
- Products: Mobile; Fixedline telephony Broadband; IPTV; Satellite television Television show Pay television IT services
- Revenue: ▲€579 million (2022)
- Net income: ▲ −€15 million (2022)
- Parent: United Group
- Website: nova.gr

Nova Telecommunications & Media S.M.S.A. is a Greek telecommunications company which provides broadband, television, mobile and fixed services. It also offers satellite services in Cyprus. It was traded on the Athens Exchange until its delisting in 2021.

In June 2016, the services for clients and SMEs were rebranded under the Nova brand. The company gave up Forthnet brand completely in June 2020.

On 29 May 2020 BC Partners' United Group agreed to purchase a majority stake in Nova from a consortium of 4 Greek banks. As of 29 April 2021 is the sole shareholder.

On October 15, 2021, Nova announced that they would be shutting down some of their older services (like Dialup, Call-by-Call and old technology ADSL) on December 15 of the same year.

On January 11, 2023, Wind Hellas merged with Nova, resulting in the rebranding of all fixed and mobile telephony, internet, and pay-TV services under the Nova brand. The merger created the second largest integrated telecommunications provider in Greece.

== History ==
Forthnet was established in October 1995 by Minoan Lines SA and the Foundation for Research & Technology – Hellas.

Nova brand was launched in Greece in December 1999 for the satellite television platform by Naspers, who also operated MultiChoice. In 2002, Nova absorbed the Alpha Digital satellite television platform. On April 14, 2008, Forthnet reached an agreement with Naspers to purchase Netmed, the parent company of Nova satellite television platform in Greece and Cyprus for €430 million.

In 2010, Nova Greece had 363,679 subscribers. HD service counted 52,968 subscribers in 2011.

In the end June 2015 the platform had 509,088 subscribers, while one year later, June 2016 it had a decrease to 460,252.

In July 2017, it was referred that Nova had 430,000 subscribers.

In 2020, Nova had 551,000 broadband internet subscribers and 457,000 pay television subscribers.

In March 2021, it was announced that Nova had 456,500 pay television subscribers making it the second largest TV provider.

== Satellite Technical information ==
Nova broadcasts in standard definition using the DVB-S MPEG-2 format and (since September 2010) in high definition using the DVB-S MPEG-4 format through Hot Bird 8 satellite at 13°E. The service is encrypted with Irdeto conditional access system. Until recently the subscribers had the option of buying a specific set-top box, or using any DVB-S Irdeto enabled set-top box, but since September 2009 new subscribers are only allowed to use the company's own set-top box. This change of policy has raised some significant controversy. Nova has also introduced a digital video service, accessible only through a (different) specific set-top box. This service requires an extra subscription fee but also provides the subscriber with the option to watch two different channels on two different TV sets in the same household.

=== Digital satellite receivers ===
Nova Satellite Package includes digital satellite receivers manufactured by Pace. The current models are NovaBox HD 831 and NovaBox HD PVR 865. Older models were Panasat 1110, Panasat 910, as well as the older Panasat 720i, Panasat 700 and Panasat 642, manufactured by Panasat.

== Nova channels ==
Nova operates 4 Novacinema and 14 Novasports pay television channels and an entertainment channel Novalife. Nova channels are available in Cyprus through CytaVision, PrimeTel & Cablenet platforms.

== Nova Cyprus ==
Nova has been providing satellite television and internet services in Cyprus since 2004. Most television channels are available, except generalist television channels from Greece which do not have a broadcasting license for Cyprus.

== Logos ==
1995–2007

2007–2017

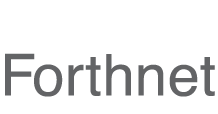
2017–2021

2021–present

The new NOVA logo from 2022 shares the same style with the largest telecommunications company in Bulgaria, Vivacom. This is due to Vivacom and Nova belonging to the same parent company, United Group.

== See also ==
- List of mobile network operators in Europe
