= ERT1 =

- Logo used since 2020
- Country: Greece
- Broadcast area: National
- Headquarters: Broadcasting House

Programming
- Language: Greek
- Picture format: 1080i HDTV (downscaled to 16:9 576i for the SDTV feed)

Ownership
- Owner: ERT
- Sister channels: ERT2 Sport; ERT3; ERT News; ERT Cosmos

History
- Launched: 23 February 1966; 60 years ago 11 June 2015; 11 years ago (relaunch)
- Former names: EIR (1966–1970); EIRT (1970–1975); ERT (1975–1987); ET1 (1987–2013)

Links
- Website: ERT1

Availability

Terrestrial
- DVB-T (DTT): All over Greece at local frequencies

Streaming media
- ERT1 Live: Watch Live

ERT1 (Greek: ΕΡΤ1 "ERT Ena") is a Greek free-to-air television channel owned and operated by state-owned public broadcaster Hellenic Broadcasting Corporation (Greek: EPT – Ελληνική Ραδιοφωνία Τηλεόραση). It is the corporation's flagship television channel, and is known for broadcasting mainstream and generalist programming, including news bulletins, talk shows, cultural shows, prime time drama, cinema and entertainment, and major breaking news, sports and special events.

It was launched on 23 February 1966 as the first regular television service in Greece. It was launched as a television service of the National Radio Foundation (EIR). In 1970 it was transformed into the National Radio Television Foundation (EIRT). Then became ERT, ERT1, ENA, and ET1 before being closed by the Greek government in 2013, when it was mainly an entertainment and cultural channel but also broadcast documentaries, news, sports and children's shows. On 11 June 2015, ERT was reopened and the ERT1 name was restored, technically replacing NERIT 1 which had been launched by the previous government in 2014 as part of the New Hellenic Radio, Internet and Television (Greek: Νέα Ελληνική Ραδιοφωνία, Ίντερνετ και Τηλεόραση, abbrev. NΕΡIΤ or NERIT).

== History ==
The channel launched on 23 February 1966 as part of the National Radio Foundation (EIR), as the first general television channel in Greece. TED, Armed Forces Television (Τηλεόρασις Ενόπλων Δυνάμεων, ΤΕΔ) orientated towards the Hellenic Armed Forces only, went on air four days later on 27 February 1966 (renamed as Armed Forces Information Service (Υπηρεσία Ενημερώσεως Ενόπλων Δυνάμεων, ΥΕΝΕΔ) from 1970).

ERT (Ellinikí Radiophonia Tileórasi) replaced EIRT on 3 December 1975. Colour television was introduced in 1979, using the French SECAM system.

On 3 November 1982, the Hellenic Armed Forces relinquished ownership of YENED to ERT. when it was renamed ERT2. In 1987, ERT1 and ERT2 were amalgamated into a single company and became ET1 and ET2. ET3 was launched on 14 December 1988 and ET2 became known as NET (New Hellenic Television) in 1997. With the restructuring, ET1 started putting emphasis on local productions and quality entertainment.

On 18 August 2011, the government under George Papandreou proposed to close ET1 and redistribute its programs to ERT's two remaining television channels, NET, and ET3. However, the Greek coalition government (with Antonis Samaras as Prime Minister) abolished ERT entirely on 11 June 2013, resulting in widespread condemnation. ET1 went off air on the same day, but ERT's employees at Broadcasting House kept NET on air, with the assistance of the European Broadcasting Union, who sent satellite retransmission vans to the station's headquarters, via the Internet and as part of the ERT Open movement, until riot police evicted them on 7 November 2013. Employees from the Thessaloniki studio continued to unofficially transmit ET3, also via the Internet and under the same movement, until 11 June 2015.

On 11 June 2015, exactly two years after the closure of ET1, the coalition government with Alexis Tsipras as Prime Minister restored ERT as part of counter-austerity measures. On the same day, ERT1 replaced NERIT1 on its frequencies, which had operated since 2014.

== Programming ==
Foreign series:

- Chica Vampiro
- Murdoch Mysteries
- Agatha Christie's Poirot
- Seis Hermanas
- Madam Secretary

Greek comedies:

- Haireta mou ton platano
- Ta kalitera mas hronia
- I tourta tis mamas
- Zaketa na paris

Shows include:

- From 6 a.m. – ERT weekday breakfast show from 5:30–10 a.m.
- Communication – Airs from 10–12 a.m.
- ERT News – Daily newscast, with national and international news. Airs at 6:00am, 12:00noon, 3:00pm, 6pm, 9pm (main newscast) and 12:00am midnight.
- Connections – Airs from 10am - Noon.
- flERT – Daily infotainment show about culture.
- See and find – Daily game show from 8–9 p.m.
- Sport Sunday – ERT sports show on its 55th season. Hosted by Tasos Kollintzas and Elena Mpouzala.
- Personally – A show which shows stories of remarkable people. Hosted by Elena Katritsi.
- Various research shows such as Roads, Special Missions, ERT Report, etc.

== Logos and identities ==
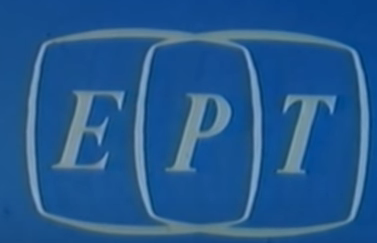
3 December 1975 to 24 October 1987

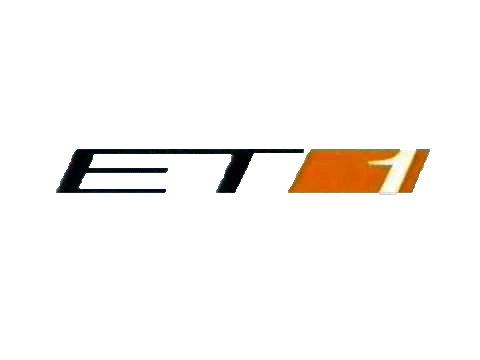
2000 to 22 October 2003

7 June 2008 to 11 June 2013

11 June 2015 to 28 September 2020

28 September 2020 to present

== See also ==
- ERT
- ERT2
- ERT3
- ERT News
- ERT Sports
