= Armed Forces Information Service =

Television and radio station of the Greek Armed Forces

The Armed Forces Information Service (Greek: Υπηρεσία Ενημερώσεως Ενόπλων Δυνάμεων, ΥΕΝΕΔ, Ypiresia Enimeroseos Enoplon Dynameon, YENED) was the television and radio station of the Greek Armed Forces, operating from 1966 until its conversion to a civilian broadcaster in 1982.

== History ==
=== TED begins ===
The station was set up on an experimental basis on the grounds of the Hellenic Military Geographical Service, and began broadcasting on 27 February 1966, a few days after the start of television broadcasts from the National Radio Foundation (EIR). Originally it was called Armed Forces Television (Τηλεόρασις Ενόπλων Δυνάμεων, ΤΕΔ).

=== TED becomes YENED ===
In November 1970, it was renamed the Armed Forces Information Service, now including radio stations as well. It remained under military control until 3 November 1982, when it was renamed ERT2.

According to its founding act, YENED -being, in essence, a military unit- was responsible for:

1. Psychological warfare.
2. Τhe national, moral and social education of the Armed and Security Forces and, secondarily, of the public.
3. Informing the public about the ongoing work of the Armed Forces and issues of general interest.
4. Stimulation of the morale of the fighting Nation during mobilization or war.
5. Τraining of military personnel in the operation of image capture devices and generally of image projection machines.

In 1982, YENED was renamed to ERT-2 and converted to a decentralised public service of the Ministry of the Presidency of the Government.

=== Last years under the civilian control as ERT-2 ===
In 1987, ERT2 and ERT1 were amalgamated into a single company, and ERT2 became ET2 (and later New Hellenic Television or NET).

== Depictions in other media ==
The early days of the station's existence are dramatized in the 1984 cult Greek comedy Loafing and Camouflage by Nicos Perakis, based on his own experience there during his military service.
