= Hellenic Broadcasting Corporation =

Greek public broadcasting corporation

Hellenic Broadcasting Corporation Ελληνική Ραδιοφωνία Τηλεόραση
- Logo since September 2020

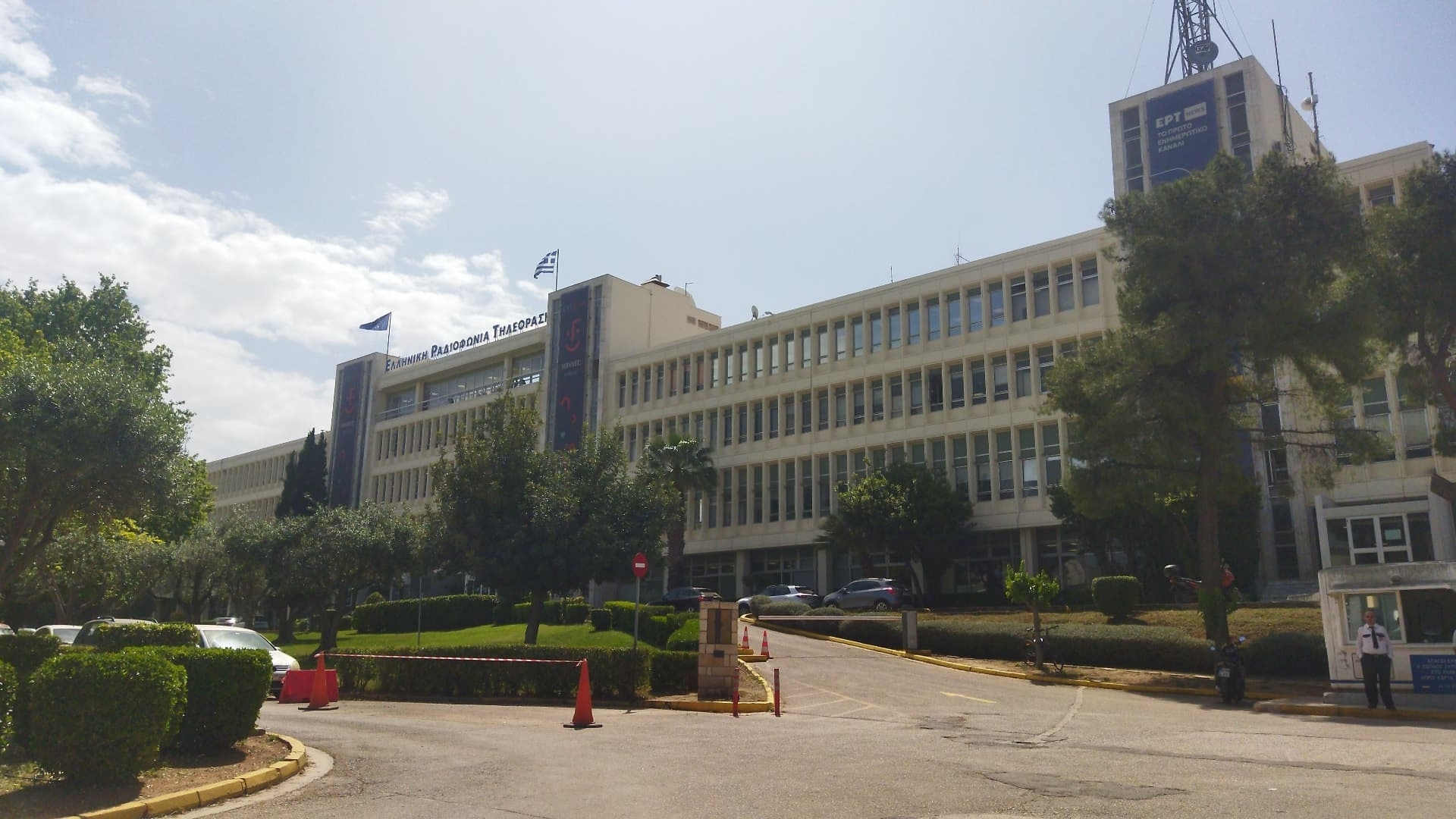
- Type: Radio, Public broadcasting network
- Branding: ERT (English); EPT (Greek)
- Country: Greece
- Availability: Nationwide
- Founded: 1936 (as YRE)
- TV stations: ERT1, ERT2 Sport, ERT3, ERT News, ERT Cosmos
- Net income: ▲32.264€ million (2023)
- Headquarters: Zappeion (1936–1968); Mourouzi Studio (1968–1974); Broadcasting House/House of Radio/Radiomegaron (1974–present)
- Broadcast area: Greece; Cyprus (also parts of Turkey, Albania, North Macedonia and Bulgaria near the Greek border)
- Owner: State-owned
- Launch date: 7 September 1936; 90 years ago (radio); 23 February 1966; 60 years ago (Television); 11 June 2015; 11 years ago (relaunch)
- Dissolved: 11 June 2013; 13 years ago (original)
- Former names: ΥΡΕ (1936–1941); ΑΕΡΕ (1941–1945); ΕΙΡ (1945–1970); ΕΙΡΤ (1970–1975)
- Picture format: 576i 16:9 (SDTV); 1080i 16:9 (HDTV)
- Callsign meaning: Ελληνική Ραδιοφωνία Τηλεόραση
- Official website: ert.gr
- Replaced by: NERIT and EDT (2013–2015)

The Hellenic Broadcasting Corporation (Greek: Ελληνική Ραδιοφωνία Τηλεόραση A.E., romanized: Ellinikí Radiofonía Tileórasi A.E., lit. 'Greek Radio [and] Television S.A.'), commonly shortened to ERT (Greek: ΕΡΤ), is the state-owned public radio and television broadcaster of Greece.

== History ==
=== Overview ===
ERT began broadcasting in 1938 as the Radio Broadcasting Service or YRE (Υπηρεσία Ραδιοφωνικής Εκπομπής, ΥΡΕ).

Following a government decision, the original company was abolished on the 11th of June 2013, with its 2,656 employees protesting against the closure and continuing broadcasting via a satellite transmission using European Broadcasting Union equipment. The EBU also began providing Internet streaming of the ERT broadcast.

On the 12th of June 2013, the Greek government proposed a successor organization, New Hellenic Radio, Internet and Television (Νέα Ελληνική Ραδιοφωνία, Ίντερνετ και Τηλεόραση), shortened to NERIT (ΝΕΡΙΤ), which launched in August 2013 as "Public Television" (Δημόσια Τηλεόραση). As protests against the decision of the government (Coalition of New Democracy, PASOK, DIMAR) continued, on 15 June Prime Minister Samaras proposed returning ERT to service immediately, by having an emergency committee rehire selected employees. This offer was rejected by the ERT employees and Samaras' coalition partners.

On 17 June 2013, following an appeal by ERT's employees to the Council of State (Greece's highest administrative court), the Council suspended the government's decision to interrupt broadcasting and shut down ERT's frequencies and ordered the Finance Minister and the minister responsible for media, signing the decision, to take "all necessary organisational measures for the continuation of transmission of broadcasting services and operation of internet websites by a public broadcaster for the period until the establishment and operation of a new operator that will serve the public's interest". In his ruling, the Council's President found that the government's decision violated Law 1730/1987 which requires "the contribution by a public broadcaster to informing, educating and entertaining the Greek people and the diaspora". The Council's appellate division upheld the original Temporary Injunction three days later.

Until 24 October 2013, ERT's employees were able to offer the television programmes of NET (also simulcast in HD as ERT-HD) and ET3, and the radio programmes of ERA Athens-Thessaloniki and Third Programme through conventional means (analogue and digital TV, FM, medium and shortwave radio broadcasts) as well as over the Internet. At approximately 18:11 EEST, ERT lost their satellite capacity on the Astra 23.5°E satellite after successful lobbying by the Greek government to the capacity provider SES. That halted most conventional TV and radio broadcasts that received the feed from the satellite but did not affect the regional ERA affiliates that produced their programming locally, nor a large part of Athens which is served by a DVB-T transmitter located within the ERT HQ in Ayia Paraskevi. Web streaming was not affected at all.

As of 24 March 2014, more than nine months after the decision to close down ERT, the striking workers still ran 17 radio stations (15 regional, two national) and a single TV channel (ET3), from the regional radio studios, and the ET3 Television Building in Thessaloniki. FM and AM transmissions continued throughout Greece with some interruptions and shortwave transmissions continued with weaker transmission power. All radio stations were also available as web streams. The TV channel was sporadically transmitted by conventional means (analogue transmitters in Thessaloniki) and was always available as a web stream.

In April 2015, the Hellenic Parliament approved the draft of re-opening ERT S.A. and also voted and approved the draft of re-opening this broadcaster.

On 11 June 2015, ERT relaunched to replace NERIT.

=== 1938–2013 ===
ERT began broadcasting in 1938 as the Radio Broadcasting Service or YRE (Υπηρεσία Ραδιοφωνικής Εκπομπής, ΥΡΕ), initially limited to radio services from Athens, with the Athens Radio Station based in the Zappeion. During the Axis occupation of Greece, the service was renamed as the Limited Hellenic Radio Company or AERE (Ανώνυμη Ελληνική Ραδιοφωνική Εταιρεία, ΑΕΡΕ). After Liberation, in 1945 the service was reorganized as the National Radio Foundation or EIR (Εθνικό Ίδρυμα Ραδιοφωνίας, ΕΙΡ), still based at Zappeion. The radio services were expanded to three national radio services as well as international radio services for emigrant Greeks. EIR was one of 23 founding broadcasting organizations of the European Broadcasting Union in 1950.

Test television broadcasts began in 1965 and full TV service began in 1966. In 1970, the company was renamed National Radio and Television Foundation or EIRT (Εθνικό Ίδρυμα Ραδιοφωνίας-Τηλεόρασης, ΕΙΡΤ). In 1966, the Hellenic Armed Forces began their own TV station, the Armed Forces Television or TED (Τηλεόρασις Ἐνόπλων Δυνάμεων, ΤΕΔ), renamed in 1970 as the Armed Forces Information Service or YENED (Ὑπηρεσία Ἐνημερώσεως Ἐνόπλων Δυνάμεων, ΥΕΝΕΔ). Television was prominently used as a propaganda medium by the Greek junta. YENED kept its name and military orientation until the early 1980s, when it was renamed ERT2 by the then PASOK government. On 1 September 1987, a third station was added – ET3, based in Thessaloniki, with mostly regional programming focused on Macedonia and the rest of Northern Greece.

During the first 20 years of TV services in Greece, ERT broadcasting was limited, starting at around 5 pm to between midnight and 2 am. Since 1997 the three ERT TV channels are known as ET1, NET and ET3, and broadcast round the clock. ET1 is an entertainment channel whereas NET is focused on news services. ET3 is still focused on Northern Greece issues, although it broadcasts nationwide.

ERT was a major national sponsor and the official broadcaster of the 2004 Olympic Games in Athens. It has been broadcasting the Olympic Games in Greece since the Mexico City Games of 1968. It also broadcasts IAAF games while it is shown on privately owned channels mainly in the United States. Today it broadcasts documentaries, some from the private sector, and a few animated shows. With the introduction of independent privately owned channels in Greece in the late 1980s, programme quality changed to a more commercial variety, in order to survive the fierce competition for ratings. This was a major shift in the network's principles that was dominated by wider variety, alleged "higher quality" programmes including documentaries and World Cinema.

On the 19th of August of 2011 the Hellenic Broadcasting Corporation announced a planned restructuring of the company; ERT's main channels became NET and ET3, while ET1 was incorporated into the program of NET and ET3. Additionally the digital channels Cine+ and Sport+ ceased broadcasting, and their programming were again incorporated into that of the company's two major domestic channels. ERT World also saw changes in its programming to reflect the needs of the Greek diaspora as identified by a survey conducted by ERT. The Minister of State also said that the company would become public but no longer state-owned.

=== Closure ===
At 17:45 EEST (UTC+3) on the 11th of June of 2013, the Greek spokesperson, Simos Kedikoglou, announced ERT would close by the end of the day. ERT shutdown caused the loss of jobs for 2,500 employees.

ERT was dissolved by a Common Ministerial Decision that was enacted by virtue of Article 14B of Law 3429/2005 (regarding the dissolution, merger and restructuring of public companies) as amended by an urgent government Legislative Ordinace (FEK 139/11.06.2013, Issue A'). Despite running a budget surplus on income from a license fee outside the state budget, in a televised statement, Simos Kedikoglou, the minister responsible for media and the government's spokesperson, said that the ERT was a "haven of waste" that cost more and had fewer viewers than private stations.

Later in the evening, some of ERT workers managed to continue the broadcasting via Ustream. Police forced their way into at least one of the transmitting stations, and all ERT transmitters were closed down around Greece, as was eventually the worldwide ERT World feed. Using satellite offices and other spaces that had not been closed down, ERT journalists continued to broadcast to the Internet. The nearest ERT Transmitters to Athens closed at approximately 23:17 local time. 20 seconds later, channel 902TV (the communist party channel) retransmits the ERT signal, although a few minutes later, the Greek government called Digea, the digital television service, to close the signal [902's] due to rebroadcasting the signal without permission, and so 902 was closed for a period of time. This action was deemed unacceptable by most Greek citizens due to the Greek Government shutting down ERT without consulting the National Council of Radio and Television, the official body of Radio and Television in Greece.

On the 12th of June at noon local time, the AS and IP range of ERT, the official domain names "ert.gr", "ert3.gr", and "voiceofgreece.gr" were cancelled in the Greek Internet registry, meaning that live broadcasts on the Internet (ERT LIVE) have stopped, as well as the publication of all news articles. Emails sent to the broadcasters are no longer delivered. Other Internet assets registered by ERT are at risk of being closed (because their owner and contact address are no longer valid), notably the official Facebook page and Twitter account. ERT LIVE is relayed by other sites, such as the University of Greece.

The European Broadcasting Union was quick to criticise the closure, issuing a statement the same evening where they expressed "profound dismay on behalf of Europe's entire public service media" and urged the prime minister to reverse the decision. The EBU made the ERT stream available on satellite to its members, declaring as well that "to be in the EBU, you must be a broadcaster, and so we will continue keeping ERT on the EBU council" as said by the director, Ingrid Delterne.

Alexis Tsipras, the leftwing opposition leader, who would later become Prime Minister, expressed dismay in regards of ERT's shutdown and described it as "illegal".

=== NERIT ===
On the 12th of June in 2013 a Greek government spokesperson, Simos Kedikoglou, announced the formation of a new public service broadcaster, New Hellenic Radio, Internet and Television. The company's services were expected to launch on 29 August 2013. The service provider employed between 1,000 and 1,200 and was funded by advertising and tax contributions.

Prior to its launch on television, a temporary state television broadcaster known as Dimosia Tileorasi (English: Public Television) launched on 10 July 2013 on the frequencies of ERT, launching as Elliniki Dimosia Tileorasi (English: Greek Public Television). It was closed on 4 May 2014, in order for it to be replaced by NERIT.

=== Relaunch of ERT ===
In 2015, the government, under Prime Minister Alexis Tsipras, restored ERT as Greece's public broadcaster and NERIT ceased broadcasting on 11 June 2015, at 6:00 EEST.

== Services ==
=== Radio ===
ERT broadcast radio programmes under the name of Hellenic Radio, since 1988. Under this name, ERT broadcasts four national radio services:

- ERT News Radio 105.8 is 24/7 news radio channel.
- Second Programme (Δεύτερο Πρόγραμμα) is primarily a Greek music station.
- Third Programme (Τρίτο Πρόγραμμα) is more of a classical music/arts & culture station (with some drama thrown in).
- ERA Sport a sports-oriented station, with regular news every hour and sports news every half-hour. During the late night hours most ERA programmes aired a common night program.
- Kosmos 93.6 is primarily a world music (ethnic, soul, jazz, etc.) station.
- Voice of Greece (ERA 5) is an international audience shortwave radio station. Under the name of the ERA International Network, Voice of Greece and some ERA domestic programmes were rebroadcast on AM and FM stations throughout the globe.
- 102 FM is the news station for the city of Thessaloniki.
- 95.8 FM is the music and cultural station for Thessaloniki.
- Zeppelin 106.7 is the new rock music station.

Former, discontinued channels:

- Trito Programma Vrahea, ERT3's global radio station.
- Philia 106.7, radio station for immigrants in Greece.

For regional audiences, ERT has 19 regional stations with relays. The regional station in Macedonia was the only one with two separate programme streams and a shortwave service. The interval signal for all ERA programmes are several opening bars of the folk song "Tsopanakos Imouna" (Once I Was A Shepherd Boy).

=== Television ===
==== Current channels ====
Name/Logo	Type	Launched	Description
	Free-to-air	23 February 1966; 11 June 2015 (relaunch)	ERT1 is the generalist channel. ERT1 broadcasts the news at 12:00, and 18:00. ERT1 transmits a series of live news and current affairs programmes round the clock. ERT1 also broadcasts old Greek movies, gameshows, different series and late night talk shows. This channel broadcasts different documentaries and shows in the weekend afternoons, music shows at 22:00 every saturdays, as well as kids movies every friday nights.
	Free-to-air	27 February 1966; 11 June 2015 (relaunched as ERT2) 4 October 2025 (ERT2 Sport)	ERT2 Sport is a 24-hour sport channel that replaced the regular ERT2 on October 4 2025. ERT2 Sport broadcast sport shows, football, basketball, and other sport matches. Auto Moto ERT show about cars and motorcycles.
	Free-to-air	14 December 1988; 29 June 2015 (relaunch)	ERT3 is ERT's only channel which does not broadcast from Athens, but from Thessaloniki. The channel's programme contains short news bulletins every hour and two main longer editions at 13:00 and 19:00, as well as kids shows. This channel is mainly focused on culture and regional issues.
	Free-to-air	3 March 2022 (test phase); 5 September 2022 (official broadcasts)	ERT News is the main news and current affairs channel. It broadcasts on the former frequency of Deutsche Welle.
	9/2/19 Free to air 1/12/20 Web Tv	27 April 2011 (as ERT HD); 9 February 2019 (as ERT Sports)1/12/20 As ERT 1 HD	ERT Sports is a series of five public channels that broadcast 24-hour sport programmes, replaced ERT1 HD in Dec 2020. It is also available on ERTFLIX
	Satellite	1996; 3 May 2016 (relaunch)	ERT Cosmos is compendium of all ERT programming via satellite, mainly intended for the Greek diaspora.

==== Former discontinued channels ====
- Cine+ – movies (part of ERT Digital).
- Sport+ – sports (part of ERT Digital).
- Prisma+ – program for hearing impaired (part of ERT Digital).
- Studio+ – music (part of ERT Digital in association with MAD TV).
- Info+ – news and current affairs (part of ERT Digital).
- Cinesport+ – merger of Cine+ and Sport+.

=== Internet ===
- www.ert.gr is the ERT's official website.
- ERT Play is the internet channel of ERT which started broadcasting on 28 January 2017. It is not a 24-hour channel, and is used to broadcast competitions when the 4 main channels can't broadcast any event (especially Olympic Games). The first programme that was broadcast is the presentation of Demy for Eurovision 2017.
- www.ertflix.gr is ERT's movie and television series streaming platform. It also live streams ERT's channels and has all of ERT's TV transmissions.
- mousikasynola.ert.gr is the website of its Music Ensembles.
- www.ertnews.gr is the ERT's news website.
- www.ertsports.gr is the ERT's sports website.
- vog.ert.gr is the Voice of Greece's website.
- www.ertecho.gr/ is ERT's audio streaming platform

=== Music Ensembles ===
ERT is also home to three music ensembles:

- National Symphony Orchestra
- Contemporary Music Orchestra
- Hellenic Radio Choir

The music ensembles' broadcast is called Protos Orofos (First Floor) and aires on the Third Programme every Saturday at 14:30.

== Funding ==
ERT is mainly funded by a license fee, which is also paid with the electricity bill (along with other applicable taxes) which represents the vast majority of resources in the public group. The fee was 4.74 euros per month in 2013, equal to 56.88 euros annually, but was reduced to 3 euros per month upon the launch of ERT. It is not connected with actual ownership of a TV set.

There are modest grants from the government for contributing to educational public missions. However, since 2008, some commercial resources from advertisers (even though the channels have lost significant parts of audiences) and the economic crisis in Greece has severely impacted the profitability of advertising and of commercial cooperation for the joint production of programs, as well as the collection of license fees on electricity bills.

== Corporate identity ==
The opening bars of Tsopanakos Imouna (Greek: Τσοπανάκος ήμουνα) is ERT's corporate theme music, as well as their interval signal on radio.

ERT is the holder of the biggest audiovisual archive in Greece, which includes also significant moments of modern Greek history.

== Logo history ==
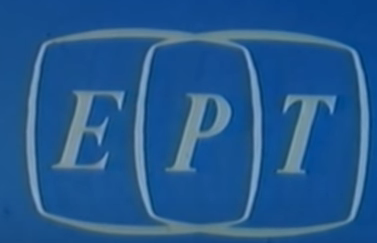
3 December 1975 – 11 August 1987

2002 – 7 June 2008

7 June 2008 – 28 September 2020

28 September 2020 – present

== See also ==
- List of Greek-language television channels
- List of radio stations in Greece
- Television in Greece
