= ERT2 Sport =

Greek public television network

- Country: Greece
- Broadcast area: National
- Headquarters: Broadcasting House

Programming
- Language: Greek
- Picture format: 1080i HDTV (downscaled to 16:9 576i for the SDTV feed)

Ownership
- Owner: ERT
- Sister channels: ERT1; ERT3; ERT News; ERT Cosmos

History
- Launched: 27 February 1966; 60 years ago 11 June 2015; 11 years ago (relaunch)
- Replaced: Armed Forces Information Service; NERIT Plus
- Former names: TED (1966–1970); YENED (1970–1982); ERT2 (1982–1987, 2015–2025); ET2 (1987–1997); NET (1997–2013); DT2 (2013-2014); N2 (2014); Nerit Sports (2014); Nerit Plus (2015)

Links
- Website: ERT2

Availability

Terrestrial
- DVB-T (DTT): All over Greece at local frequencies

Streaming media
- ERT2 Live: Watch Live

ERT2 Sport (Greek: ERT 2 Σπορ, "ERT Dyo Spor") is a Greek free-to-air sports television channel owned and operated by Greece's public broadcaster Hellenic Broadcasting Corporation (Greek: EPT – Ελληνική Ραδιοφωνία Τηλεόραση). It is the corporation's second television channel.

It was originally referred to as "ERT2" and "ET2" (short for Ellinikí Tileórasi 2; Ελληνική Τηλεόραση 2 (Greek for 'Hellenic Television 2')) but the name was later changed to "NET" (short for Néa Ellinikí Tileórasi; Νέα Ελληνική Τηλεόραση (Greek for 'New Hellenic Television')), before changing back to "ERT2" by technically replacing NERIT Plus. Amid protests of the government's decision to close the public broadcaster, ERT staff continued to operate NET via satellite and internet. until November 7, 2013, when riot police stormed into ERT headquarters and took the internet programming of NET off the air.

== History ==
On the 27th of February 1966, a second television channel was created by the Hellenic Armed Forces, the Armed Forces Television (TED), which in 1970 became a fully-fledged second broadcaster as the Armed Forces Information Service (YENED). It contained news, sports, fashion, music, drama series and more rarely documentaries, films, and children programming.

On 3 November 1982, YENED passed under civilian control and was renamed as ERT2. Public broadcasters were the only broadcasters in Greece. ERT2 followed the same programming. In 1987, ERT and ERT2 became one company, ERT and the channels rebranded ET1 and ET2.

The channel started losing ratings due to the arrival of private television channels. As consequence of that, In 1997, ET2 was restructured as a news and information channel, airing documentaries and sports. It was therefore renamed as NET (Nea Elliniki Tileorasi/New Hellenic Television). The new name appeared on 20 October 1997.

On 11 June 2013, NET was taken off air after the Greek government announced its decision to close ERT. Amid protests, NET continued to be broadcast via the Internet with the help of the European Broadcasting Union until November 7, 2013, when police forces invaded the ERT building and took the program off.

By ERT relaunch on June 11, 2015, the station returned as ERT2, technically replacing NERIT Plus in its space.

From 4 October 2025, the channel will be rebranded ERT2 SPOR and will only air sports programming. The new format will include a protocol with the Hellenic Olympic Committee, valid until year-end 2027.

== Programming ==
ERT2's shows (prior to the reconversion to an all-sports channel in 2025) included:

- Athens Tower – The show, suggests our most important, the most interesting and different things that will happen or are happening in Athens and are output for entertainment and fun. Actions, events, entertainment, gastronomy, exhibitions, odd and the city's singularities, places and people that shape new trends and anything is created, moves and plays in Athens. Airs Saturdays at 6:30 pm.
- The Era of Images - Katerina Zacharopoulou, observing the international artistic activity, meets and talks with artists, museum directors, and curators. The show focuses on the artistic discourse, the importance of large or smaller exhibitions in contemporary society and the Biennial European countries, presenting young artists with interesting jobs. Visiting museums and galleries with exhibitions that attract the interest of the general public.
- Without Question - The documentary series, "Without question," is a series of film-documentary portraits of people of literature, science and art. Without asking the guest-hence the title of our broadcast only makes a personal narrative, as if it is addressed directly to the audience and tells us important pieces of his life and professional career.
- Ancient Drama - In each episode, a different project is presented through the eyes and the interpretive approach of a modern director or coefficient of theatre at a time, in the form of a free course-workshop. The series aspires to him how to build a new proposal for a set of current research programs and teaching of ancient drama, as active researchers meetings of theatre with young actors within the framework of a public course.
- Art Week - Shows that every week presents some of the most renowned Greek artists. Lena Aroni conversing with musicians, directors, writers, actors, artists, with people who, by the way, and dedication in their work, have won the recognition and love of the public. They speak for the way they approach their subject matter and describe joys and difficulties encountered in their path. Airs at 5:30 pm.

=== Foreign Series ===
- Anne of Green Gables
- Charlie Chaplin films
- Laurel and Hardy films
- Borgen
- Seis Hermanas
- Downton Abbey
- Murdoch Mysteries
- Upstairs and Downstairs
- Parade's End
- Dancing with Jazz

=== Live events ===
- Eurovision Song Contest
- Formula One (qualifying and race)

=== Children's ===
- Sesame Street
- Snorks
- Hallo Spencer
- Doug
- Mickey Mouse Works
- Hercules
- Darkwing Duck
- Quack Pack
- The Legend of Tarzan
- Timon & Pumbaa
- Disney Channel original films
- Walt Disney Pictures films
- Dragon Hunters
- Noddy, Toyland Detective
- Postman Pat (including SDS)
- Tilly and Friends
- Distance education (via Educational Television of the Greek Ministry of Education and Religious Affairs)
- Go Jetters
- Hey Duggee
- Superhero Kindergarten

== Logos and identities ==
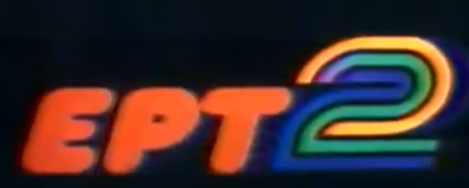
3 November 1982 to 1984

1984 to 11 August 1987

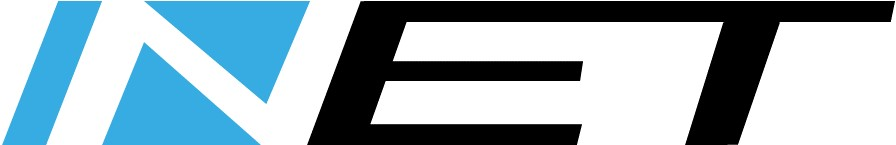
20 October 1997 to 7 June 2008

7 June 2008 to 7 November 2013

11 June 2015 to 28 September 2020

28 September 2020

Since 4 October 2025

== See also ==
- ERT
- ERT1
- ERT3
- ERT Sports
