= Vouli TV =

Βουλή Τηλεόραση Voulí Tileórasi
- Country: Greece

Programming
- Picture format: 576i (SDTV) 16:9

Ownership
- Owner: Hellenic Parliament

History
- Launched: 1999; 27 years ago

Links
- Webcast: Live Streaming
- Website: Vouli TV Official Site

Availability

Terrestrial
- DVB-T: All over Greece at local frequencies

Voulí Tileórasi (Greek: Βουλή Τηλεόραση, Parliament TV) is a Greek network dedicated to airing non-stop coverage of government proceedings and public affairs programming. The name comes from Greek Βουλή Voulí, meaning 'assembly', 'council', or 'parliament'; and Tileórasi, meaning television.

== Overview ==
The primary aim of the channel is to give each citizen direct access to the inner workings of the Hellenic Parliament. It broadcasts live all sessions of parliament and the meetings of the department of parliamentary recess. Also broadcast recorded not live, the work of the various permanent parliamentary committees. Voulí TV broadcasts a daily parliamentary newscast that gives briefings on the day-to-day business of parliament, as well as information on democratic institutions and the parliamentary history of Greece.

It also features updates on the European Parliament with special emphasis on the Greek members of parliament. The network also features non-political type programming, a block of cultural programming airs daily from 6pm-Midnight, with documentaries (covering various topics such as the arts, society, nature, history and science), films, theatre, dance, opera and classical music.

Voulí TV is the only channel of its kind in Europe that broadcasts terrestrially, FTA without the need for any special equipment or subscription fees. The signal is transmitted from 19 broadcast centres on the country which enable it to reach over 50% of the population. Efforts are underway to increase transmission so that the entire country can receive the signal. Voulí is also available on satellite, the signal transmits on Hotbird 3 and HellasSat.

== Programming ==
The main objective of the TV channel is to give every citizen, direct access to the inner workings of the Greek Parliament. Broadcast live, all sessions of Parliament, and the part of the parliamentary progress. Also on the broadcast channel, but no live recordings works of various standing committees.

- Morning Reading - Information broadcast on the parliamentary activities of the day. Airs Monday to Friday at 9-10am.
- Notebooks of parliamentary speech - Emission series based on the eponymous edition of the Foundation of the Hellenic Parliament. Presented and discussed major Greek political speeches of our modern history.
- Parliamentary Stories - Documented facts of modern and contemporary history since the foundation of the Greek state as today, that took place in the Parliament.
- What the law says - Discussion with parties rapporteurs for the legislative work.
- Membership Card - Information series programs for lives in the European Union.
