= Broadcasting House (Athens) =

Building in Athens, Greece

Coordinates: 38°00′47″N 23°49′33″E

ERT Broadcasting House
- Ραδιομέγαρο ΕΡΤ
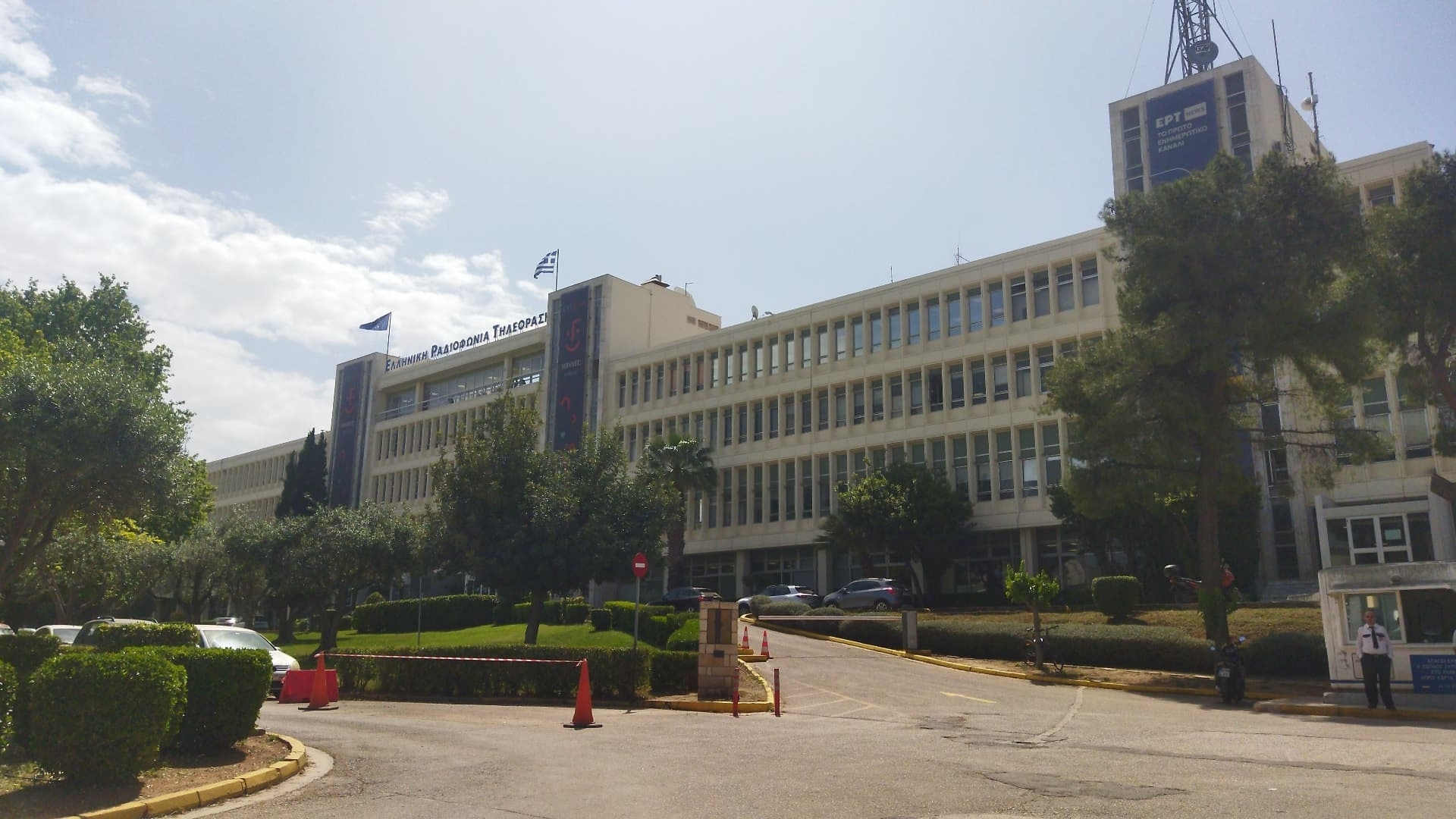
- Broadcasting House in 2024

- Location within North Athens

General information
- Architectural style: Brutalist architecture
- Location: Athens, Greece, Mesogeion Avenue 432, Agia Paraskevi, Greece
- Construction started: 1968; 58 years ago
- Completed: 1969
- Inaugurated: 1974
- Owner: ERT

Technical details
- Floor count: 4

The Broadcasting House or House of Radio (Greek: Ραδιομέγαρο, romanized: Radiomégaro) is an office and broadcasting installation building in Athens, Greece. It currently houses the Greek state broadcaster, the Hellenic Broadcasting Corporation.

== History ==
=== Construction and early years ===
Construction started in 1968, during the Greek military dictatorship for the housing of EIRT (National Radio Television Foundation), later replaced by the Hellenic Broadcasting Corporation (ERT). Construction was complete by 1969 and it was inaugurated in 1974. It is one of the many examples of Brutalist architecture in public buildings in Athens.

=== 2013: Occupation by workers and police invasion ===
On 11 June 2013, with the closure of ERT, the redundant workers occupied the building, which became the scene of large-scale demonstrations on the same day, on 11 September and 7 November. On 7 November, the riot police invaded, occupied and evacuated the building, evicting the workers.

=== The ERT sign, its removal, and re-installation ===
Prior to its replacement, the original ERT sign was spelled out as "ELLINIKI RADIOFONIA TILEORASI" in Greek, with white text on a blue background.

On 13 April 2014, the old ERT sign was removed from the building in preparation for the installation of ERT's successor, New Hellenic Radio, Internet and Television. On 20 September, the new NERIT sign finished installation. Unlike its original predecessor, it was all blue text without a background, something which remains true in the current ERT sign. The sign remained there until 8 June 2015, when the "N" and "I" were removed to spell ERT after Alexis Tsipras decided to reopen the broadcaster. ERT was restored 3 days later, after NERIT closed on 6:00 EEST.

On 4 November 2017, the entire Greek spelling of ERT "ELLINIKI RADIOFONIA TILEORASI" was then restored on top of the building.

== See also ==
- List of Greek-language television channels
- List of radio stations in Greece
- Television in Greece
- List of Brutalist structures
