= ERT3 =

Greek public television channel based in Thessaloniki

- Country: Greece
- Broadcast area: National
- Headquarters: ERT3 Studios, Thessaloniki, Greece

Programming
- Language: Greek
- Picture format: 1080i HDTV (downscaled to 16:9 576i for the SDTV feed)

Ownership
- Owner: ERT
- Sister channels: ERT1; ERT2 Sport; ERT News; ERT Cosmos

History
- Launched: 14 December 1988; 37 years ago (ET3); 29 June 2015; 10 years ago June 2015 (ERT3)
- Former names: ET3 (1988–2015)

Links
- Website: ERT3

Availability

Terrestrial
- DVB-T (DTT): All over Greece at local frequencies

Streaming media
- ERT3 Live: Watch Live

ERT3 (Greek: ΕΡΤ3, "ERT Tria") is a Greek free-to-air television channel owned and operated by state-owned public broadcaster Hellenic Broadcasting Corporation (Greek: EPT – Ελληνική Ραδιοφωνία Τηλεόραση). It is an entertainment channel, and although it broadcasts nationwide, most of its content is aimed at Northern Greece. It mainly broadcasts from Thessaloniki with regional studios in various north cities, including Florina, Komotini, Alexandroupoli and on the islands of Paros, Lesbos (Mytilene) and Samos.

== History ==
The headquarters

The channel launched as ET3 (Greek: Ελληνική Τηλεόραση 3, Ellinikí Tileórasi 3) on 14 December 1988, following the merger of state-owned TV and radio services into ERT, as a single entity.

On 11 June 2013, the Greek coalition government (then with Antonis Samaras as Prime Minister) abolished ERT and attempted to close the Thessaloniki studio, but the station's employees continued to unofficially transmit ET3 via the Internet as part of the ERT Open movement, protesting the closure of public television and producing citizen journalism. Exactly two years later, the following coalition government (with Alexis Tsipras as Prime Minister instead) restored ERT as part of the counter-austerity measures: on the same day, ET3 adopted its current name and identity. The channel, under the new name ERT3, returned on all domestic television platforms.

== Headquarters ==
Unlike its national counterparts from Broadcasting House in Athens, it broadcasts from Thessaloniki, due to ERT3 being centered towards Northern Greece, although it still broadcasts nationwide.

== Logos and identities ==
7 June 2008 to 11 June 2015

11 June 2015 to 28 September 2020

Since 28 September 2020

== Programming ==
Shows included:

- Αlithina Senaria (Real scenarios) – Informative series, that takes the viewer around the country and the world, to meet people who excel in various topics and subjects. From a businessman on Wall Street to a shepherd in Pindos, from an acclaimed journalist to a hermit in Pilios, fascinating people with a story to tell. This program is now in its 9th season and has been the most watched show on ERT-3 since its inception. Hosted by Nikos Aslanidis.
- Anichnevsis (Tracing) – A socio-political talking program regarding politics and science. Hosted by a journalist Pantelis Savvidis. Thursdays at 10:30 pm.
- Deltio Eidiseon (News forecast) – Daily newscast, with national and international news as well as regional news with a focus on headlines from Northern Greece. Airs at 1:00pm, 3:00pm and 12:00am, with update at 7:00pm. Main newscast hosted by Olga Pharidis.
- Diaspora (Diaspora) – A series that focuses on bridging the gap between Greeks living abroad and Greece. It gives a voice to the diaspora, to tell about their way of life, the problems they face, stories about their experiences and more. A show that will inform and entertain viewers the world around. Hosted by Xrusa Samou.
- Κyriaki Sto Horio (Sunday in the village) – It is a journey to different towns and villages across the country giving viewers a glimpse at life in rural Greece, the traditions, music, culture, history and problems that the residents face. An informative and entertaining program that looks at how those outside the city live. Hosted by Marni Hatziemmanouil, airs Sundays at 3:30pm.
- Lavyrinthos (Labyrinth) – Weekly program that deals with Politics and features a discussion on issues of importance that are making headlines. Economic and policy debates as some of the topics discussed, with live reports and a focus on a regional issue affecting Thessaloniki and all of Northern Greece. Hosted by Alexandros Triantafillidis.
- Ο Κosmos Ton Spor (The world of sports) – It is a look at the top stories from the sports world. With news and analysis of the day's events, scores and highlights of matches, live reports and guests in the studio. A daily wrap up from the Greek sports scene as well as the rest of the world. Hosted by Tasos Stamboulis, airs Monday to Friday at 8:00pm.

== See also ==
- ERT
- ERT1
- ERT2
- ERT News
- ERT Sports
