= Television in Cyprus =

Television in Cyprus was introduced in 1956. In 1957, CyBC was created. Private television was introduced on 26 April 1992, by the church owned Logos TV which started its transmissions in stereo and Teletext from day one. In August 1995, Logos also introduced the first internet service provider in Cyprus, LogosNet. By the mid-1990s, Cyprus had five free-to-air television channels, with the appearance of ANT1 Cyprus and Sigma TV. The Republic of Cyprus currently uses the PAL colour system and has converted terrestrial transmissions to digital on 1 July 2011, in line with EU policy. Because of the political division of the island, television companies are also divided.

== Republic of Cyprus ==
Terrestrial digital transmission is now available in Cyprus (parallel analogue transmissions ended finally on 1 July 2011). Satellite digital transmission is available through Nova platform. Athina Sat, another provider, was launched in May 2005 but ceased operations in 2008. CytaVision and PrimeTel both offer digital TV through IPTV transmission and Cablenet through its privately owned cable network (in certain urban areas).

=== Free-to-air ===
==== Public Stations ====
- CyBC 1 (Aglandjia) (ΡΙΚ 1)
- CyBC 2 (Aglandjia) (ΡΙΚ 2)
- CyBC HD (Aglandjia) (ΡΙΚ HD)
- ERT News (Agia Paraskevi)
- ERT World (Agia Paraskevi)

==== Private Channels ====
- Alpha TV (Nicosia)
- ANT1 (Nicosia)
- Capital (Limassol)
- New Extra (Limassol)
- Omega TV (Nicosia)
- Plus TV (Nicosia)
- Sigma TV (Nicosia)
- Smile TV (Limassol)
- Vergina (Nicosia)

The private channels ANT1 Cyprus, Plus TV, Mega Cyprus (a predecessor of Omega Channel), Sigma and New Extra formed Velister which carried their digital programming. It's thought that Velister covered the whole south region of Cyprus before the analogue switch off on 1 July 2011. Reception of free to air digital channels varies across the country. Since 2026, Hellas Sat has taken over digital transmission, activating the DVB-T2 standard.

=== Pay TV ===
==== Platforms ====
- Cablenet (Engomi)
- CytaVision (Strovolos)
- Epic TV (Nicosia)
- NOVA Cyprus (Nicosia)
- PrimeTel (Limassol)

==== Channels ====
- ART Cyprus (Limassol)
- Cablenet Cinema (Nicosia)
- CytaVision Sports (Nicosia)
- Greek Cinema (Nicosia)
- Movies Best (Nicosia)
- Omonia TV (Nicosia)

=== Others ===
- BFBS
- ERT World
- Euronews
