= Telecommunications in Cyprus =

Telecommunications in Cyprus includes radio, television, fixed and mobile telephones, and the Internet, in the Republic of Cyprus.

Cyta, the state-owned telecommunications company, manages most telecommunications and internet connections on the island. However, following the recent liberalization of the telecommunications sector, a few private telecommunications companies, have emerged.

== Radio and television ==
The Cyprus Broadcasting Corporation (CyBC, Greek: ΡΙΚ, Turkish: KRYK) is the main broadcaster in Cyprus, although there are also privately owned 4 radio and 3 TV stations. A television channel from the Greek state broadcaster ERT (ERT World) is available. The British Forces Broadcasting Service also operates radio and TV stations, although the TV signal is now confined to the Sovereign Base Areas or encrypted for copyright reasons.

- Radio stations: A mixture of state and privately run radio services; the public broadcaster operates 4 radio stations; in addition a number of private radio stations are available; in Turkish-occupied Northern Cyprus, there are 4 public radio stations as well as privately owned radio broadcast stations (2007).
- Radio receivers: 310,000 (1997).
- Television stations: A mixture of state and privately run services with island-wide coverage; the public broadcaster operates 3 free-to-air TV channels; 10 private free-to-air TV broadcasters, satellite and cable TV services including telecasts from Greece and Turkey are available; in Turkish-occupied Northern Cyprus, there are 2 public TV stations, and privately owned TV broadcast stations (2007).
- Television sets: 248,000 (1997).
- Public TV stations:
  - RIK 1, CyBC 1st channel.
  - RIK 2, CyBC 2nd channel.
  - RIK HD, CyBC HD channel.
  - ERT News channel.
- Private free-to-air TV stations:
  - Alpha TV
  - ANT1 TV
  - ART TV
  - Capital TV
  - Omega TV
  - One Cyprus
  - Plus TV
  - Sigma TV
  - Smile Cyprus
  - Vergina Cyprus
- Subscriber TV: The first subscription channels in Cyprus were LTV and Alfa, offered by MultiChoice since the mid-1990s. The current subscription channels are:
  - Cablenet Cinema
  - CytaVision Sports
  - Greek Cinema
  - Movies Best TV
  - Omonia TV
- Some major subscription TV platforms today are:
  - Cablenet, offering services over their cable network with their triple-play package with over 30 channels.
  - CytaVision, offering approximately 30 channels via an ADSL IPTV platform, as well as LTV and Alfa.
  - epic, with 40 channels over IPTV.
  - Nova, with approximately 35 themed channels via satellite.
  - PrimeTel, offers more than 30 digital TV channels using ADSL IPTV, as well as LTV and Nova packages.

== Telephones ==
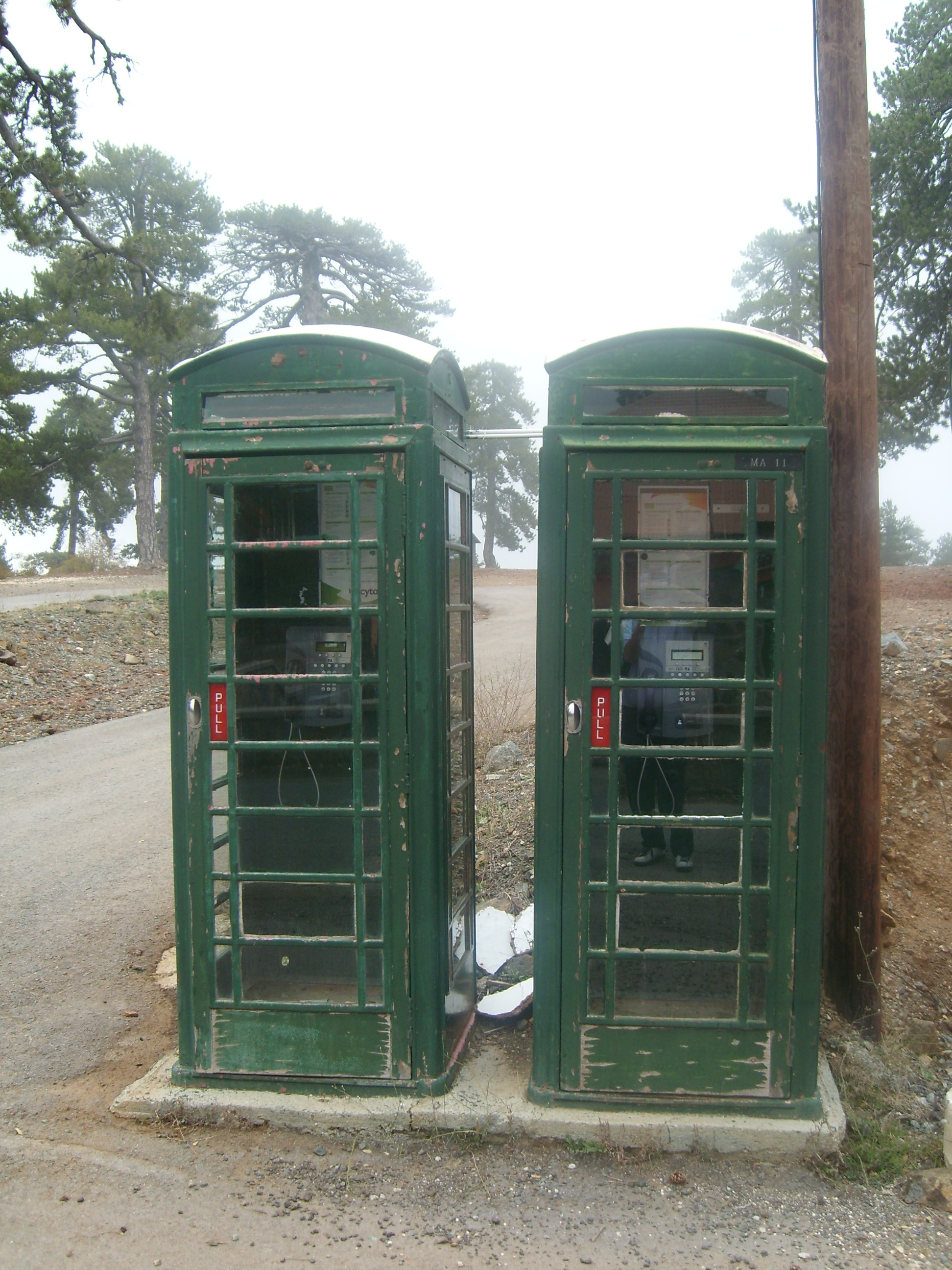
Old telephone boxes in the Troodos Mountains.

- Calling code: +357 for the Republic of Cyprus and +90 for Northern Cyprus, which uses the Turkish numbering plan.
- International call prefix: 00
- Domestic: excellent system in both the area under Republic of Cyprus government control and Turkish-occupied Northern Cyprus; open wire, fiber-optic cable and microwave radio relay.
- International:
  - Tropospheric scatter;
  - Communications cables: a number of submarine cables, including the SEA-ME-WE 3, combine to provide connectivity to Western Europe, the Middle East and Asia;
  - Satellite earth stations: 8 as follows: 3 Intelsat (1 Atlantic Ocean and 2 Indian Ocean), 2 Eutelsat, 2 Intersputnik and 1 ArabSat.
- Main lines: 373,200 lines in use, 108th in the world (2012).
- Companies that offer land-based telecommunication services:
  - Cablenet
  - Cyta
  - epic
  - Omega Telecom
  - PrimeTel
- Mobile cellular: 1.1 million lines, 155th in the world (2012).
- Companies that offer mobile cellular services:
  - Cytamobile-Vodafone, a subsidiary of Cyta and is a Vodafone partner network.
  - epic
  - PrimeTel Mobile
- Companies that offer Voice over IP (VoIP)/Cloud Telephony Services:
  - KCM Telecom, Revocoms Ltd., offers cloud and on premise based managed service telephony solutions to businesses.

== Internet ==
Asymmetric digital subscriber line, the most widespread broadband technology in Cyprus, is available in most urban and sub-urban areas, with multiple providers offering packages that range from 512 kbit/s to 32 Mbit/s. Cable broadband is also available in some urban locations (Nicosia, Larnaca and Limassol) with speeds up to 150 Mbit/s. An internet service provider comparison website exists at the Cyprus Broadband portal. Many wireless networks are appearing in Cyprus, some with no minimum contract/pay as you go and others with a fixed contract. Quantum Cable is planned 7,700 km ultra high speed optical fiber submarine communications cable system connecting Cyprus with Greece, Israel, Italy, France and Spain.

It is expected to have 160 terabits per second, capacity equivalent to streaming 80 million HD video conference calls at the same time. The Quantum Cable will be laid at same time with the 2,000 MW EuroAsia Interconnector. Quantum Cable will upgrade Cyprus to telecom hub and will support data centers on Cyprus.

- Top-level domains: .cy for Cyprus
- Internet users: 694,223 users, 126th in the world; 61.0% of the population, 63rd in the world (2012).
- Fixed broadband: 218,783 subscriptions, 82nd in the world; 19.2% of population, 51st in the world (2012).
- Wireless broadband: 384,270 subscriptions, 98th in the world; 33.8% of the population, 47th in the world (2012).
- Internet hosts: 252,013 hosts, 67th in the world (2012).
- IPv4: 1.1 million addresses allocated, less than 0.05% of the world total, 999 addresses per 1000 people (2012).
- Internet service providers: 11 ISPs (2006).
- Internet providers in Cyprus:
  - Cablenet
  - Cytanet
  - epic
  - IPTP Networks (a.k.a. Fredonia Trading)
  - PrimeTel

=== Internet censorship and surveillance ===
There are no government restrictions on access to the Internet, with the exception that gambling sites not licensed by the Republic of Cyprus are blocked, or reports that the government monitored email or Internet chat rooms without appropriate legal authority. Individuals and groups engage in the peaceful expression of views via the Internet, including e‑mail. The law provides for freedom of speech and press and the government generally respects these rights in practice. An independent press, an effective judiciary, and a functioning democratic political system combine to ensure freedom of speech and press. The law prohibits arbitrary interference with privacy, family, home, or correspondence, and the government generally respects these prohibitions in practice.

== Northern Cyprus ==
The northern part of the island is controlled by the de facto Turkish Republic of Northern Cyprus. The status of Northern Cyprus as a separate entity is recognised only by Turkey, which keeps around 30,000 troops in the north of the island.

International telephone calls to Northern Cyprus are routed via a Turkish dialing code (+90 392) as Northern Cyprus has neither its own country code nor official ITU prefix. Similarly, there is no Internet top-level domain for Northern Cyprus, which is instead under the Turkish second-level domain .ct.tr and .nc.tr. Amateur radio operators sometimes use call signs beginning with "1B", but these have no standing for awards or other operating credit.

== See also ==
- Mass media in Cyprus
- Cyprus Internet Exchange
- Cyprus Safer Internet Helpline
- Cyprus Safer Internet Hotline
