= Telephone numbers in Cyprus =

- Republic of Cyprus shown in dark green
- Country: Cyprus
- Continent: Europe
- Regulator: Office of the Commissioner of Electronic Communications and Postal Regulation
- Numbering plan type: Closed
- NSN length: 8
- Format: 2x-xxxxxx (Note: Landline numbers); 9x-xxxxxx (Note: Mobile numbers)
- Numbering plan: Cyprus National Numbering Plan
- Last updated: 6 May 2011
- Country code: +357
- International access: 00
- Long-distance: none

Telephone numbers in Cyprus follow a closed telephone numbering plan which was adopted on 1 December 2001. As a result, for landline phone numbers the digit 2 followed by the old area code was affixed to the subscriber number and for mobile phones 9 was affixed to the phone number. The plan is also used in Akrotiri and Dhekelia.

== Currently ==
Under the new system, these changed to numbers with eight digits, to be dialled from within Cyprus or abroad.

- Landline number in Nicosia called from within Cyprus (including Nicosia):
  - 22 xxxxxx
- Landline number in Nicosia called from abroad:
  - +357 22 xxxxxx
- Mobile phone number called from within Cyprus:
  - 9x xxxxxx (during that period only 09 code was in use, from CYTA)
- Mobile phone number called from abroad:
  - +357 9x xxxxxx

As with fixed line numbers, under the new system, these changed to numbers with eight digits, to be dialled from within Cyprus or abroad. Numbering portability between the networks is possible.

- Mobile phone number called from within Cyprus:
  - 9x xxxxxx (the first x depends on the company, as seen below, the second x is random except when it follows a 4 for Epic)

Company	Number
CYTA	9, 7
Epic	6, 8
PrimeTel	5
Cablenet	4

All numbers (except short codes) in Cyprus now have eight digits, hence the new numbering plan's promotional logo (in advertising) was an octopus called TESA (from Greek Τελικό Εθνικό Σχέδιο Αριθμοδότησης Final National Numbering Plan).

== In the past ==
Previously, landline numbers consisted of the trunk code 0, the area code, and a six-digit number.

- Landline number in Nicosia called from Nicosia:
  - xxxxxx
- Landline number in Nicosia called from inside Cyprus (other than Nicosia):
  - 02 xxxxxx
- Landline number in Nicosia called from abroad:
  - +357 2 xxxxxx

Mobile phone numbers had the prefix 09, followed by six digits, which had to be dialled in full.

- Mobile phone number called from within Cyprus:
  - 99 xxxxxx (during that period only 09 code was in use, from CYTA)
- Mobile phone number called from abroad:
  - +357 9 xxxxxx

As with fixed line numbers, under the new system, these changed to numbers with eight digits, to be dialled from within Cyprus or abroad. Numbering portability between the networks is possible.

- Mobile phone number called from within Cyprus:
  - 9xxxxxxx (where the first x is either 9 or 7 which belongs to CYTA, 6 which belongs to Epic, 5 to PrimeTel 4 to Cablenet)
- Mobile phone number called from abroad after 12/2001:
  - +357 9x xxxxxx

== Regional codes ==
The 5 districts of Cyprus under government control each have their own 2 digit dialling code for landline numbers. These are:

Dial Code	District
22	Nicosia
23	Famagusta
24	Larnaca
25	Limassol
26	Pafos

(Note: Kyrenia District is fully within the area not under government control. Although some websites claim the code 27 to be for Kyrenia, no phone number is assigned to it.)

After the district code, a 3 digit "area code" is written, which different for every town (Most towns have multiple codes, depending on how many numbers are in it). For example the prefixes 723 and 724 are used for Xylotymbou There isn't a list that displays all the codes, and from researching the yellow pages, the codes don't seem to be able to be narrowed down further and are mostly random.

== Situation in Northern Cyprus ==
In Northern Cyprus, the Turkish numbering plan is used. The Turkish area code 0392 has been assigned for use with landline numbers, with 0533 Kuzey Kibris Turkcell and 0542 KKTC Telsim being used for mobile phones, while the Turkish country code +90 is used for calls from the rest of the world.

For calls from the Republic of Cyprus to Northern Cyprus, the code 0139 followed by the 7-digit subscriber number is used, which are charged at local call rates. 0139 is still used for direct calls to Northern Cyprus even after the numbering plan change of December 2001.

For calls from Northern Cyprus to the Republic of Cyprus, area code 0123 is used but the call is charged at international rates. It is also possible to use the international prefix 00357.

These direct telephone connections between the two halves of the island are operated by the United Nations exchange, which allows direct telephone calls between the two communities is in place since 4 May 1998.

After 2 March 2003, direct international calls from the Republic of Cyprus to Turkey are possible. Now callers from the Republic of Cyprus can call Northern Cyprus either through Turkey dialing 0090 392 xxxxxxx (calls charged at international rates), or using 0139 (calls charged at local rates).
