= UEFA Euro 2008 broadcasting rights =

Sale of rights for broadcasting sports

This is the article listing about the broadcasting rights for UEFA Euro 2008. Previously UEFA had sold the rights to the tournament through the European Broadcasting Union (EBU), but for 2008 they worked through the sales agency Sportfive, with which UEFA expected it can increase by more than 600 million the revenue that it can generate.

== Financial targets ==
UEFA hoped to secure 600 million euros from the television rights but initially was reported to be struggling to raise the amount they wanted. In the end, UEFA secured 410 million euros from four of the five biggest markets, Germany, United Kingdom, France, and Italy. The broadcasting rights as a whole are reported to have secured UEFA over 30% more than the TV rights to the UEFA Euro 2004 championship.

== UEFA and free-to-air television ==
UEFA kept a policy that each country should be able to watch their own team on free-to-air television. However, UEFA was unhappy that the list of events that must be shown on terrestrial television in the United Kingdom included all of the matches in the tournament even though none of the home nations qualified for the event. Only in the United Kingdom and Belgium were pay television unable to bid for any of the live broadcasting rights. UEFA is bringing a legal case with the European Union as it saw this as infringing their property rights and distorted competition.

== Broadcasters ==
=== UEFA ===
Territory	Rights holder	Ref
Albania	Top Channel; Digit-Alb	
Armenia	Armenia 1	
Austria	ORF	
Azerbaijan	Lider TV	
Belarus	ONT	
Belgium	SBS; RTBF	
Bosnia and Herzegovina	BHRT	
Bulgaria	Diema	
Croatia	HRT	
Cyprus	CNC Plus TV; LTV	
Czech Republic	Prima TV	
Denmark	TV 2; Telenor	
Estonia	ERR	
Europe	Eurosport	
Finland	Yle; MTV3	
France	TF1; M6	
Georgia	Rustavi 2	
Germany	ARD; ZDF	
Greece	ERT; NOVA	
Hungary	MTV; Sport 1	
Iceland	RÚV	
Ireland	RTÉ	
Israel	Charlton	
Italy	RAI	
Kazakhstan	Khabar	
Kosovo	RTK	
Latvia	LTV; Pervy Baltiysky Kanal Latvia	
Lithuania	LRT	
Macedonia	Alsat-M	
Republic of Moldova	Prime	
Montenegro	TV In	
Netherlands	NOS	
Norway	TV 2; Telenor	
Poland	Polsat	
Portugal	TVI; Sport TV	
Romania	TVR	
Russia	VGTRK; Channel One; NTV Plus	
Serbia	RTS	
Slovakia	STV	
Slovenia	TV3	
Slovenia	TV3	
Spain	Cuatro; Canal+	
Sweden	TV4; Telenor	
Switzerland	SRG SSR	
Turkey	ATV; Digiturk	
Ukraine	NTU; Poverkhnost	
United Kingdom	BBC; ITV	

=== Rest of the world ===
Territory	Rights holder	Ref
Australia	SBS; Setanta Sports	
Brazil	Rede Record; Globosat	
Canada	TSN; Sportsnet	
Chile	Canal 13	
China	CCTV; Sina.com	
Fiji	Fiji Television	
Hong Kong	now TV	
Indonesia	MNC; RCTI; MNCTV; GTV; Indovision	
Japan	TBS; WOWOW	
Latin America	ESPN; OTI; Televideo	
Macau	TDM	
Malaysia	Media Prima; Astro	
Mongolia	C1 Television	
Myanmar	MRTV	
Middle East	Al Jazeera	
New Zealand	SKY TV; Prime	
North Africa	Al Jazeera	
United States	ABC; ESPN	
Philippines	Solar Entertainment Corporation	
Singapore	StarHub	
South Africa	SABC; SuperSport	
South Asia	ESPN Star Sports	
South Korea	KBS; MBC; SBS	
Sub-Saharan Africa	SuperSport; Canal+ Horizon	
Thailand	CH7; Channel 9	
Venezuela	Meridiano Televisión	
Vietnam	VTV, HTV	
