= Alfa TV (Cypriot TV channel) =

Former pay TV service in Cyprus

Alfa TV κανάλι ΑΛΦΑ
- Country: Cyprus

Programming
- Language(s): Greek
- Picture format: 4:3 (576i, SDTV)

Ownership
- Owner: Alfa TV Limited

History
- Launched: 1998
- Closed: 2015

Alfa TV was a pay television service available in Cyprus, that broadcast sports and children's programming as well as the odd film. It was owned by Alfa TV Ltd. and was launched in 1998. Alfa TV was one of only 2 pay-TV services in Cyprus, the other being Lumiere TV with whom Alfa TV had a programming agreement. Some of the programs on Alfa TV were broadcast incorporation with well-known pay-TV channels, and specifically with those of MultiChoice (CineMagic, SuperSport and K-T.V.).

It was broadcast over the air, together with Lumiere TV, on several platforms, like CytaVision, with an extra fee. Repeaters had been set up across the country that enabled more than 80% of the population to receive those services. Alfa TV was available on the Nova Cyprus platform but due to a financial dispute with the provider, the channel was removed and signed on with rival Athina Sat in July 2006. It was also available through IPTV providers CytaVision & PrimeTel.

As of March 3, 2008, Alfa TV returned to NOVA Cyprus following a new agreement whilst Athina Sat, had ceased operations. During the summer of 2011, the channel, was expected to be renamed to STAR Channel. The owner and former member of the parliament, Sokratis Chasikos, hired the former head manager of ANT1 Cyprus, Giorgos Tsalakos, as head manager. The contract with LTV ended in May and was not renewed.

== Former Programming ==
=== Sports ===
Alfa TV featured sports programming from Cyprus and around the world, as some of them were broadcast in corporation with SuperSport. Sports coverage included live action from NBA, WNBA, UEFA Champions League, UEFA Europa League, WWE Bottom Line, World Rally Championship, NASCAR and Champ Car World Series. In addition, Alfa TV had extensive coverage of championship football including matches from the following leagues: Super League, Premier League, Serie A, German Bundesliga and Portuguese Primeira Liga. Alfa TV also covered other events such as horse racing from the Nicosia Racing Club, tennis, boxing, bowling, billiards, rodeo, golf and extreme sports. Shows regarding sports would include:

=== Children's ===
Initially, Alfa TV would broadcast children's programs incorporation with K-T.V. At a time the latter network would collapse, Kids TV, its spiritual successor, was formed. Independently managed, it would air Warner Bros. and Nickelodeon cartoons. Coincidentally, K-T.V. in South Africa would also air Nickelodeon programming.
