= 2008 Cypriot presidential election =

- 17 February 2008 (first round); 24 February 2008 (second round)
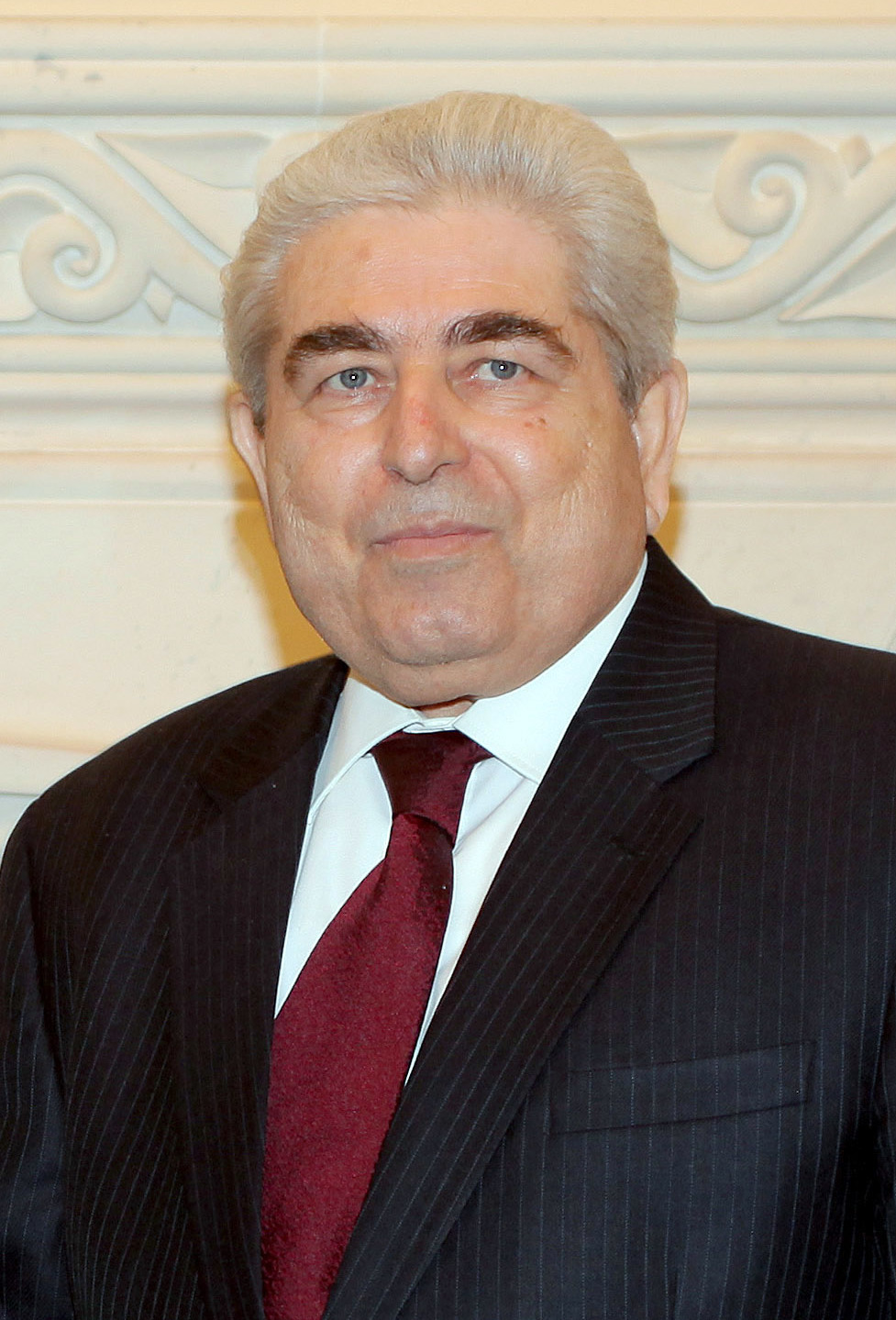

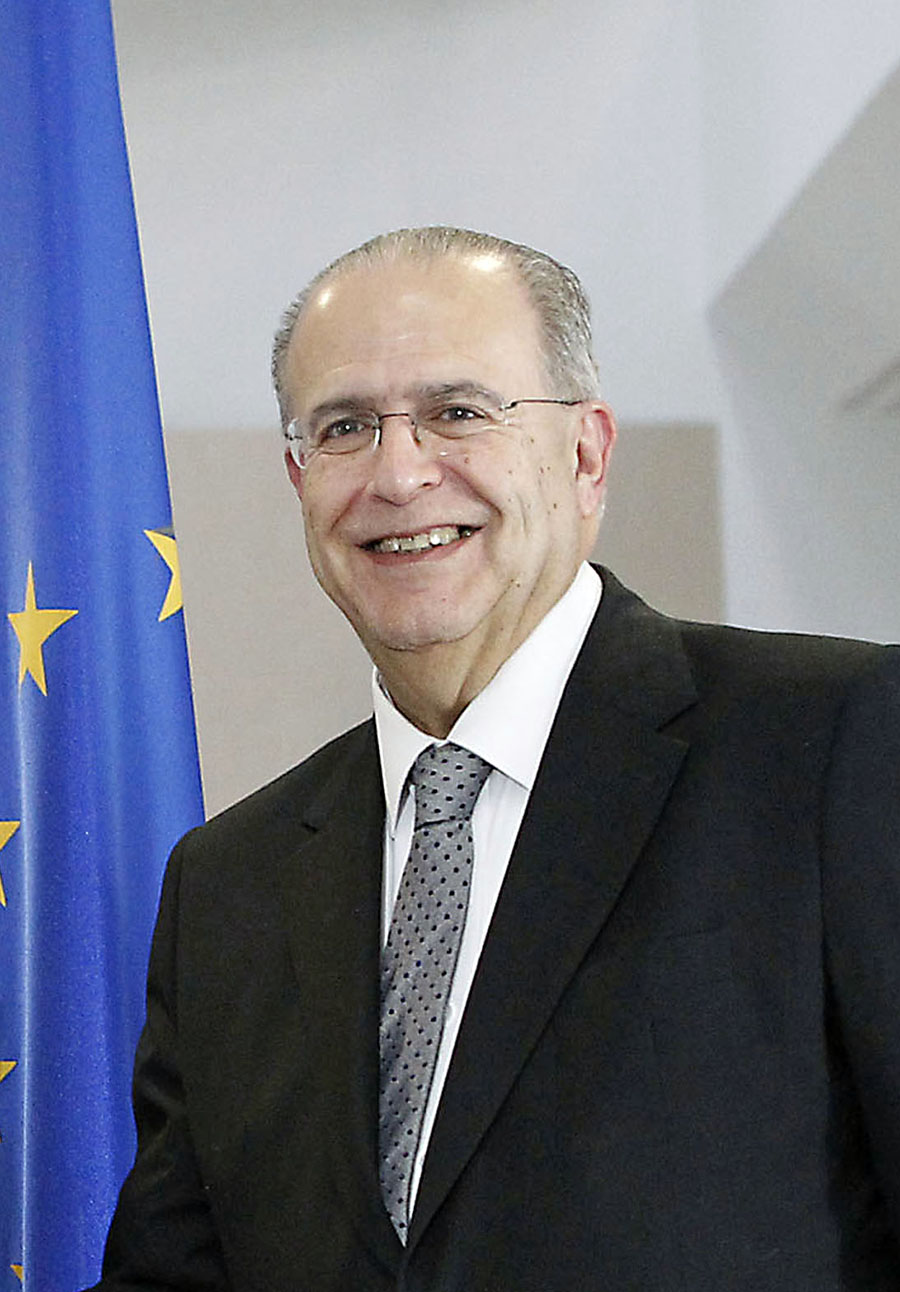
Nominee	Demetris Christofias	Ioannis Kasoulidis
Party	AKEL	DISY
Popular vote	240,604	210,195
Percentage	53.37%	46.63%
President before election
Tassos Papadopoulos
DIKO
Elected President
Demetris Christofias
AKEL

Presidential elections were held in Cyprus on 17 February 2008, with a second round on 24 February. The second-round winner, and thus the President of Cyprus for the next term, was Dimitris Christofias.

The first round saw a close result between three leading candidates, Dimitris Christofias of AKEL, Ioannis Kasoulidis of Democratic Rally, and the incumbent Tassos Papadopoulos. Results showed Kasoulidis in first place with 33.51%, Christofias in second with 33.29%, and Papadopoulos in third with 31.79%. Christophias and Kasoulidis therefore participated in a second round on February 24. The elimination of Papadopoulos in the first round was viewed as surprising.

In the second round, Christofias won with 53.37% against 46.63% for Kasoulides. He was sworn in as President on February 28.

According to the exit polls, Papadopoulos was voted for by 40% of "No" voters in the Annan referendum and 5% of the "Yes", Christofias by 35% of the "No" and 34% of the "Yes" voters and Kasoulidis by the 24% of the "No" and 62% of the "Yes" voters.

== Candidates ==
Papadopoulos (DIKO) announced in late July that he would run for re-election. In early July 2007, the ruling coalition (consisting of DIKO, AKEL and EDEK) fell apart due to a lack of consensus on a common candidate for the presidential elections; AKEL general secretary Dimitris Christofias was proposed as a common candidate by AKEL, but rejected by DIKO and EDEK (who both will support Papadopoulos' bid for reelection), which AKEL took as a reason to leave the ruling coalition. Thus, both Papadopoulos and Christophias contested the election. The Ecological and Environmental Movement (KOP) decided on November 18, 2007 to support Papadopoulos. The movement supported him in 2003 as well.

Furthermore, the Democratic Rally support MEP Ioannis Kasoulidis, a former foreign minister, and Kostas Themistokleous, a former minister of agriculture and environment, also contested the election.

Controversial MEP Marios Matsakis announced on 29 December 2007 that he would contest the election. Marios Matsakis was elected two times as a member of the Cypriot parliament and once as member of the Εuropean Parliament with the support of DIKO.

The Secretariat of the Movement of the United Democrats initially considered to support Themistokleous but at the end they supported Christophias to minimize the possibility of Papadopoulos' re-election.

Nine candidates were eventually approved to participate in the elections. Each candidate had to be recommended by one Cypriot citizen and supported by eight more.

The names of the candidates announced on 18 January 2008 were:

- Tassos Papadopoulos, supported by DIKO, EDEK, Evroko, ADIK, KOP
- Dimitris Christofias, supported by AKEL, United Democrats
- Ioannis Kasoulidis, supported by DISY, Kinima Eleftheron Politon, Evropaiki Dimokratia, Laiko Sosialistiko Kinima
- Kostas Themistokleous
- Marios Matsakis
- Andreas Efstratiou
- Anastasis Michael
- Christodoulos Neophytou
- Kostas Kyriacou (Outopos)

== Campaign ==
=== Second round ===
After the first round of the election and the elimination of Papadopoulos, the latter's party, DIKO, announced its support for Christofias although Papadopoulos himself stayed neutral. Christofias had offered three ministerial positions to DIKO, including that of Minister of Foreign Affairs, in addition to the post of President of the House of Representatives, while Kasoulides had offered five ministerial positions in exchange for DIKO's support. EDEK also backed Christofias, on the proposal of its Political Bureau, with 109 members of its Central Committee voting in favor of supporting Christofias, five voting against, and two abstaining. The Cypriot Orthodox Church leader Archbishop Chrysostomos II backed Kasoulidis.

Ecological and Environmental Movement on 21 February 2008 decided to support Dimitris Christofias.

Evroko, ADIK and Marios Matsakis announced that they will support neither of the two candidates.

Kostas Themistokleous backed Ioannis Kasoulidis.

== Debates ==
On 26 January 2008 the three main candidates, Papadopoulos, Christofias, and Kasoulidis, debated on television. The debate was transmitted by all Cypriot TV stations. The three candidates were questioned by journalists from RIK, MEGA, ANT1, Sigma TV and CNC Plus TV. The debate started at 9.45PM local time and lasted 1 hour and 50 minutes. Each candidate had three minutes to answer each question and 1.5 minute for every follow-up question. The procedure was divided in 6 sections and, at the end of each section, each candidate had 3 minutes to give a short speech and 1.5 minute for a short comment.

On 14 February, a second debate was held. The subject of discussion was the Cyprus dispute.

== Opinion polls ==
A collection of opinion polls taken before the elections is listed below. Beginning on 11 February 2008, no opinion poll is allowed to be published.

Polling Firm	Source	Date Published	T. Papadopoulos	D. Christofias	I. Kasoulidis	K. Themistokleous	M. Matsakis
Symmetron		3 October 2007	32.9%	27.5%	27.6%	0.4%	
RAI Consultants		19 November 2007	33%	28.5%	27.8%	0.4%	
Public Isuue PIK		21 November 2007	31%	30%	29%	1%	
Noverna		22 November 2007	30.1%	28.4%	27.1%	1.2%	
RAI Consultants		25 December 2007	32.7%	28.7%	26.2%	1.2%	
Noverna		17 January 2008	30.3%	29.1%	30.5%	0.1%	2.2%
Noverna		23 January 2008	30.5%	30.0%	30.1%	0.3%	2.2%
Public Issue-RIK		7 February 2008	34.0%	33.5%	30.5%	0.1%	2.0%

== Results ==
Candidate	Party	First round		Second round	
Candidate	Party	Votes	%	Votes	%
Ioannis Kasoulidis	Democratic Rally	150,996	33.51	210,195	46.63
Dimitris Christofias	Progressive Party of Working People	150,016	33.29	240,604	53.37
Tassos Papadopoulos	Democratic Party	143,249	31.79		
Marios Matsakis	Independent	3,460	0.77		
Kostas Kyriacou	Independent	1,092	0.24		
Kostas Themistocleous	Independent	753	0.17		
Andreas Efstratiou	Independent	713	0.16		
Christodoulos Neophytou	Independent	243	0.05		
Anastasis Michael	Independent	117	0.03		
Total		450,639	100.00	450,799	100.00
Valid votes		450,639	97.36	450,799	96.09
Invalid/blank votes		12,208	2.64	18,344	3.91
Total votes		462,847	100.00	469,143	100.00
Registered voters/turnout		516,441	89.62	516,448	90.84
Source: MOI, MOI

=== Geographical distribution ===
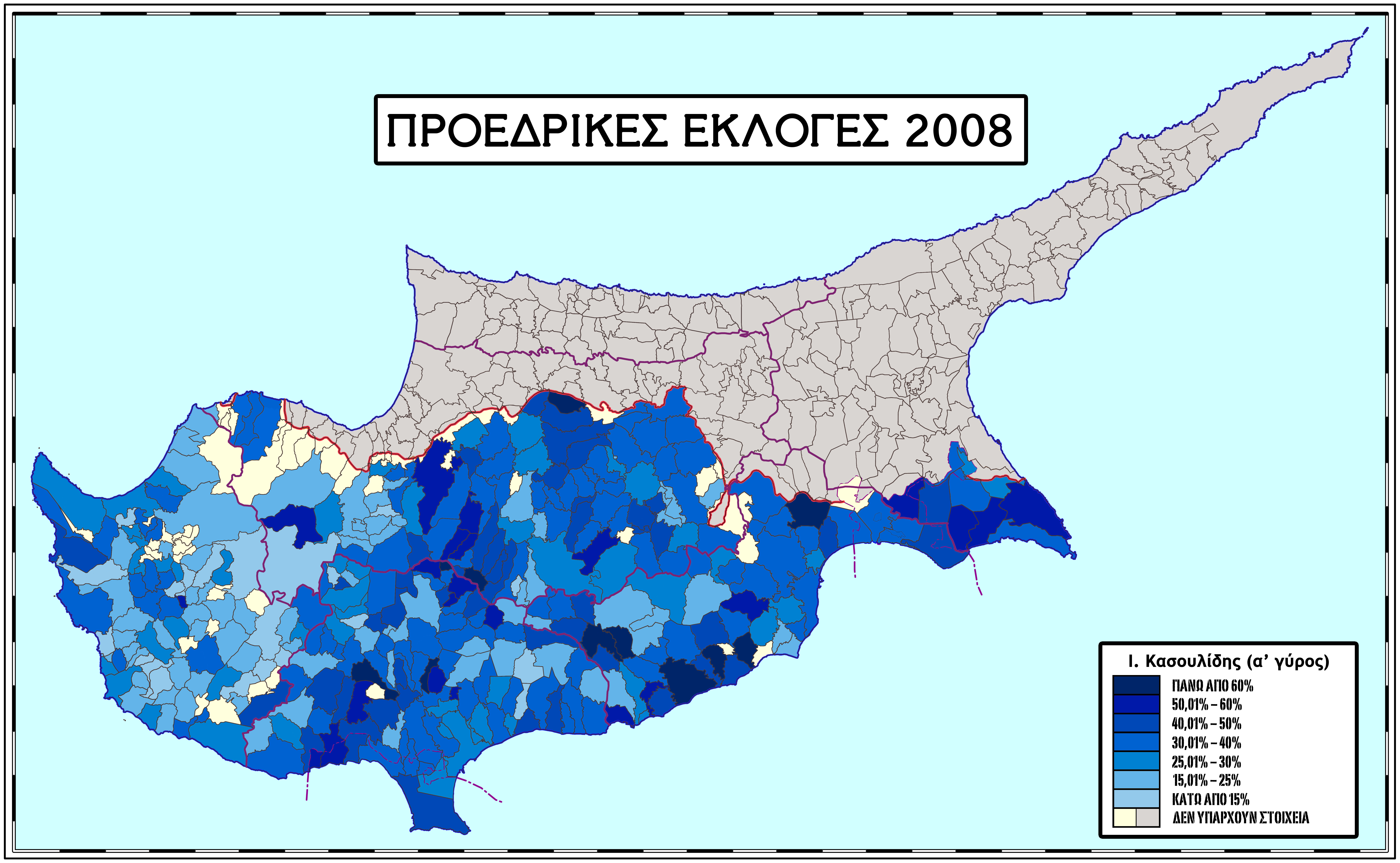
Kasoulidis' distribution (1st round) (in Greek)

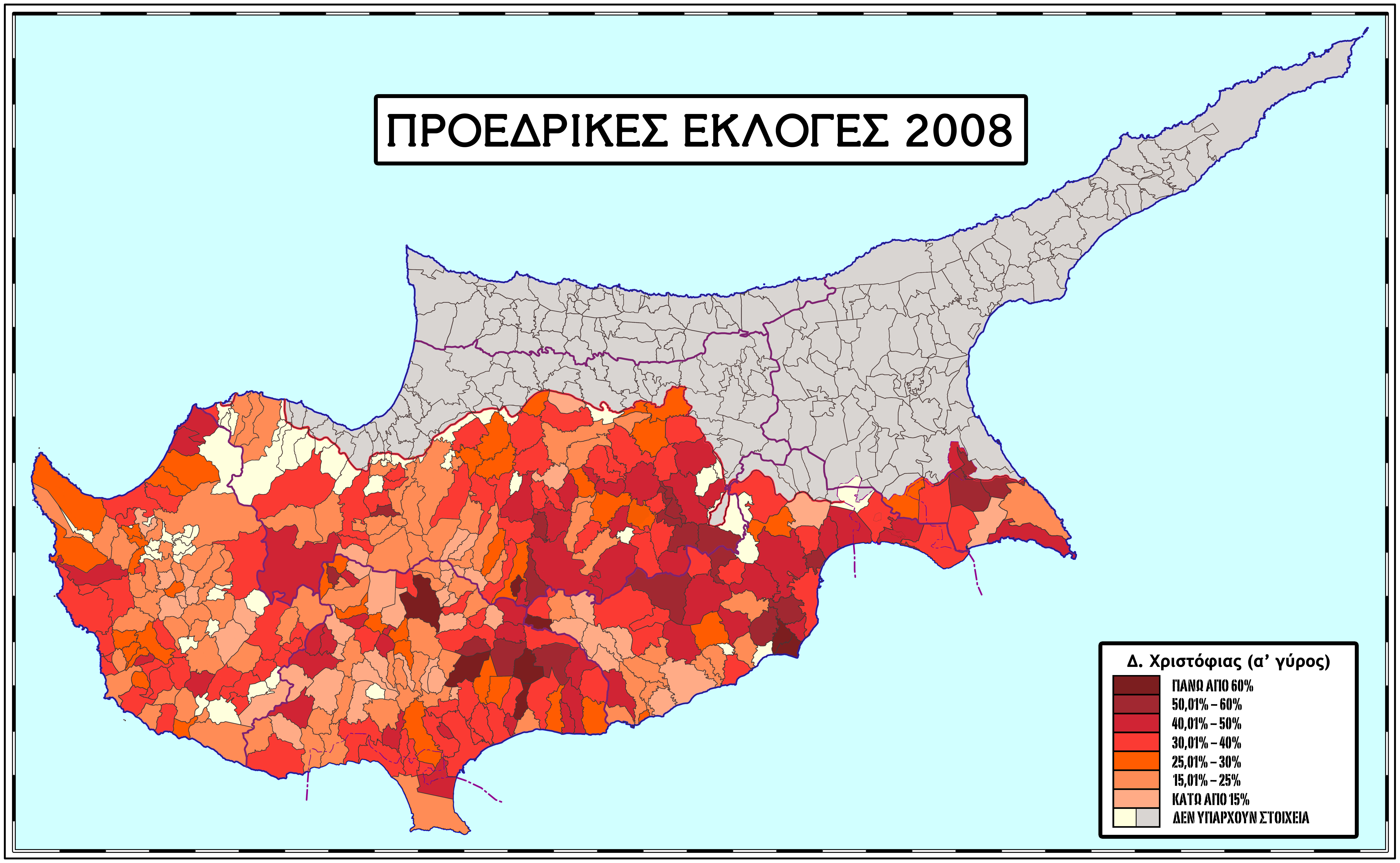
Christofias' distribution (1st round) (in Greek)

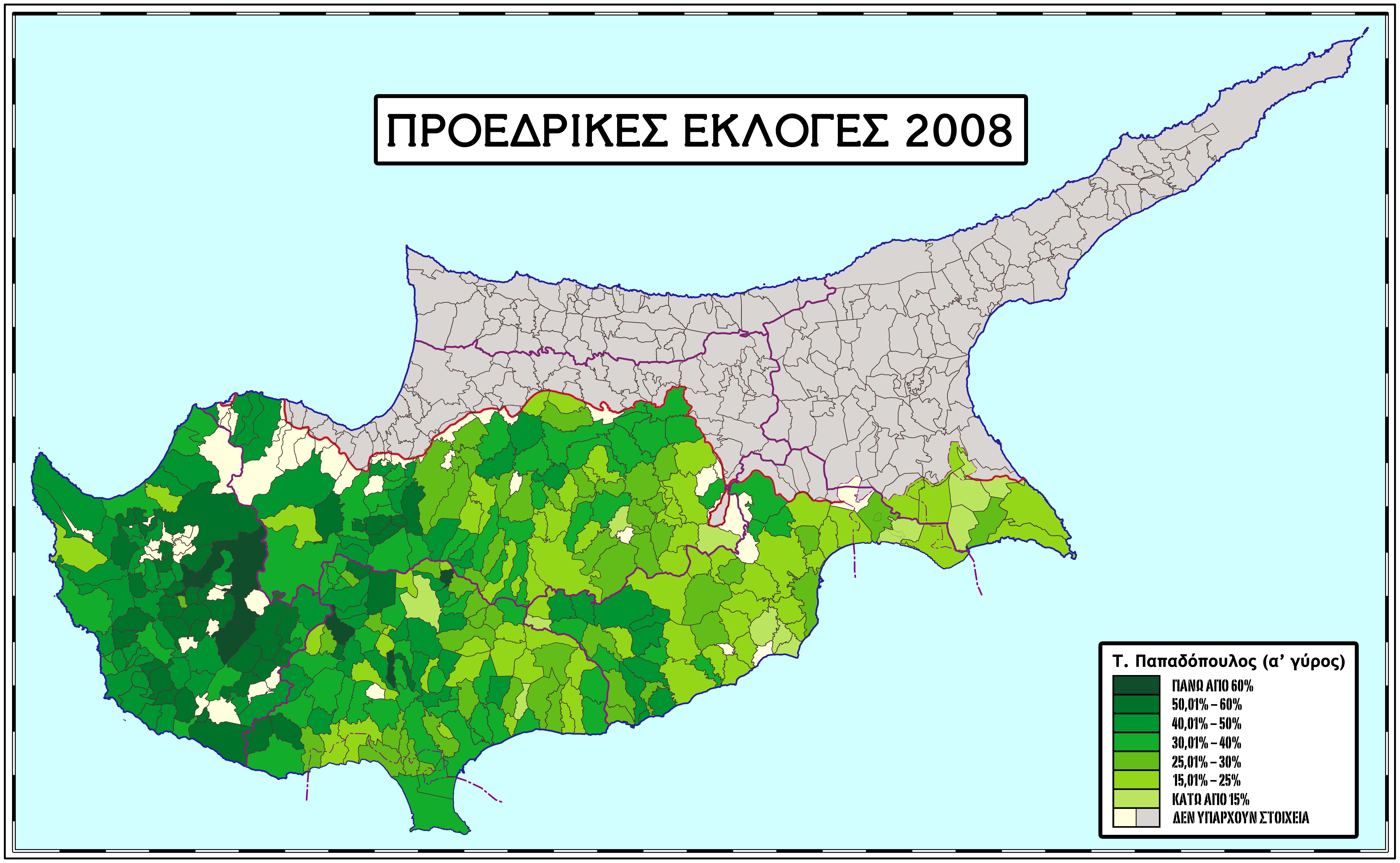
Papadopoulos' distribution (1st round) (in Greek)

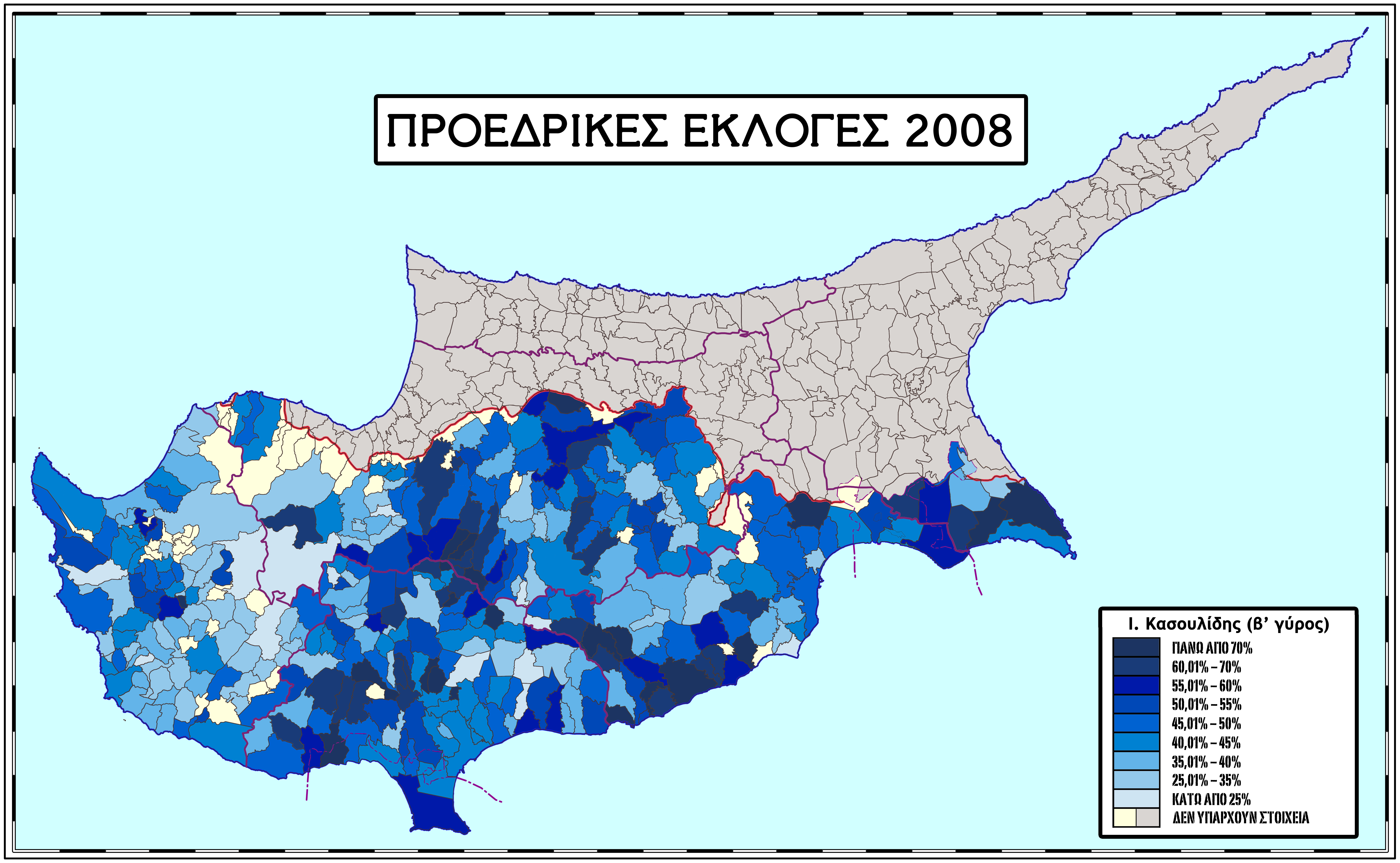
Kasoulidis' distribution (2nd round) (in Greek)

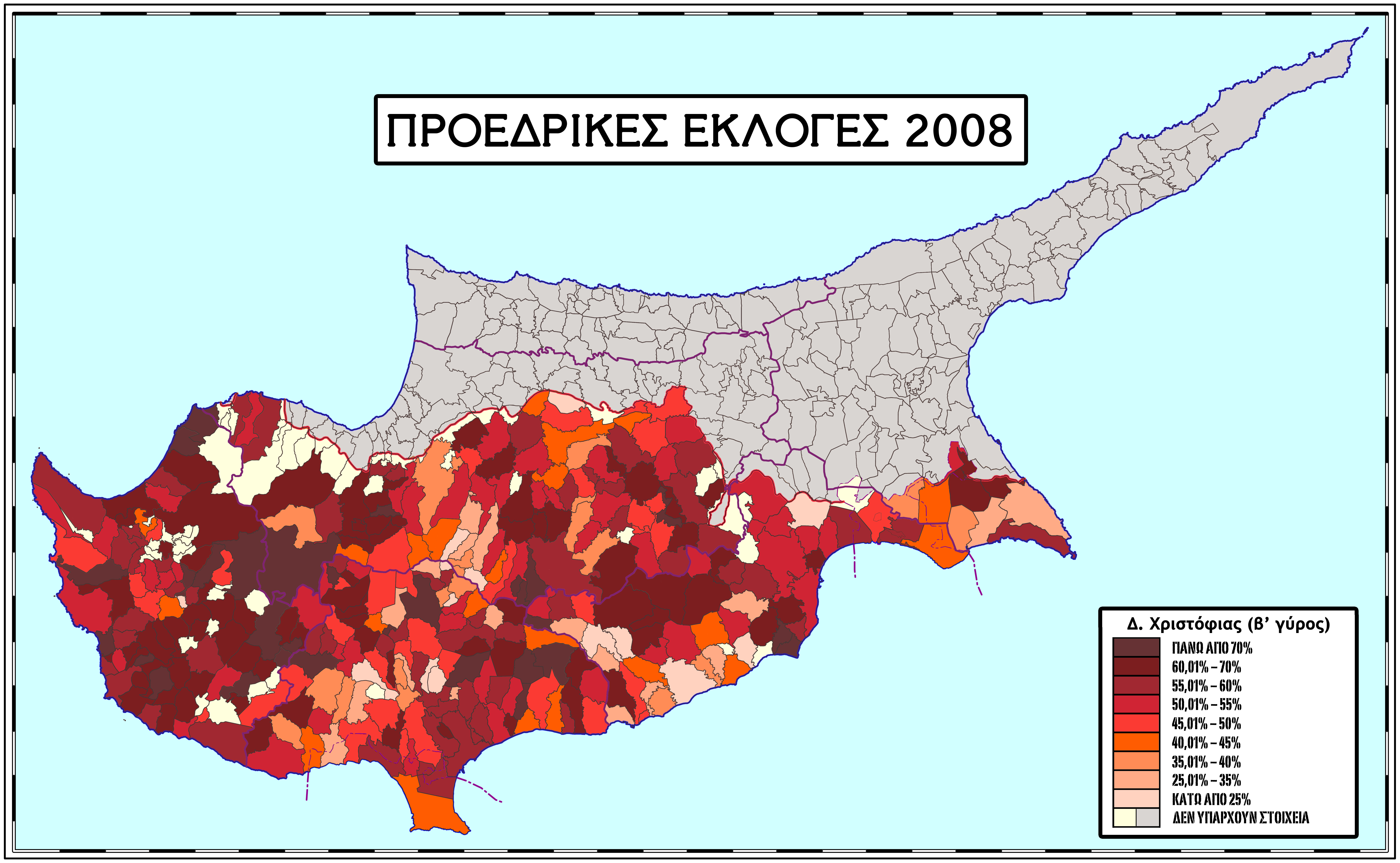
Christofias' distribution (2nd round) (in Greek)

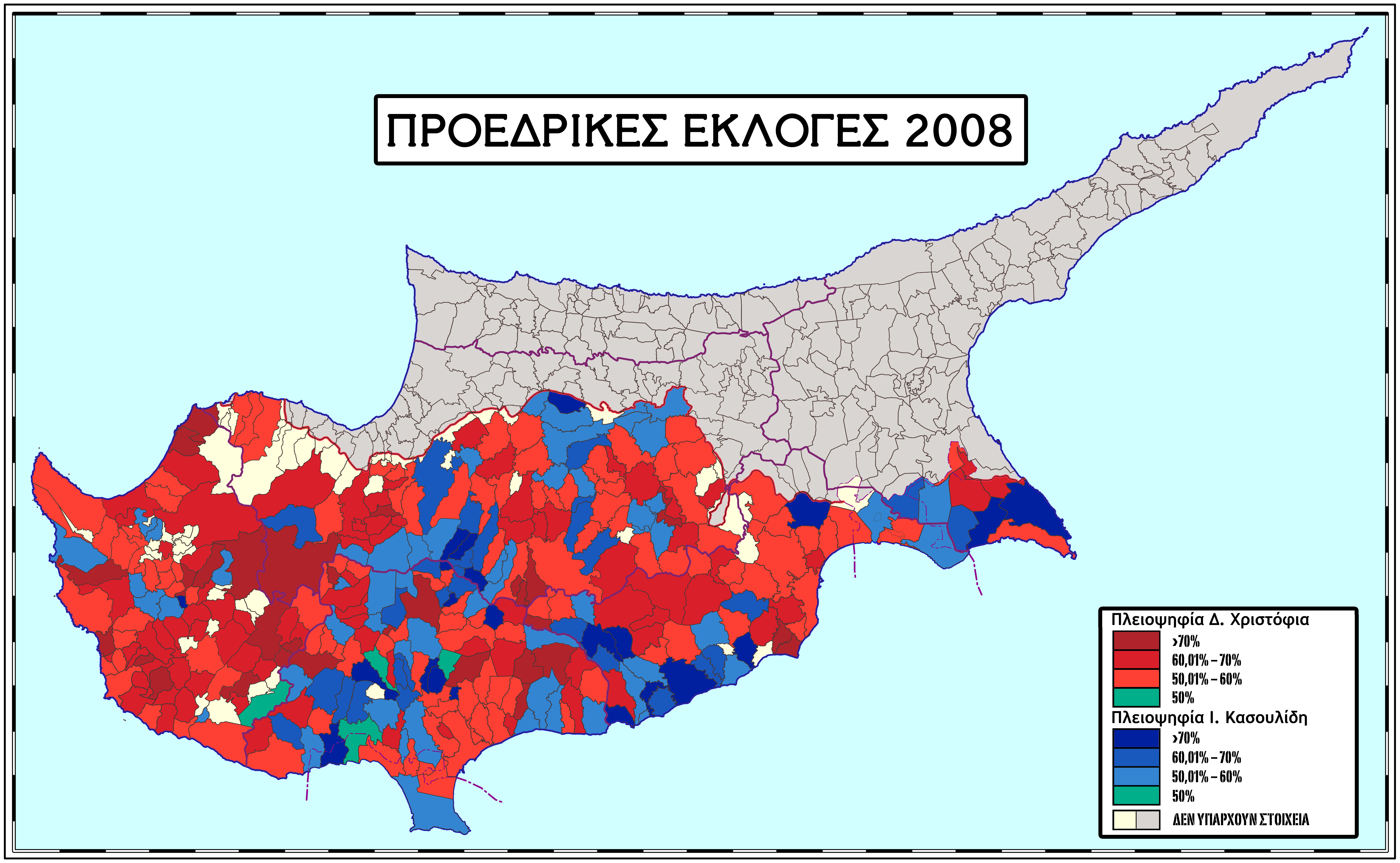
Final distribution (2nd round) (in Greek)
