= To Kokkino Potami =

- Genre: Drama; History; Romance
- Created by: Charis Tsirkinidis
- Written by: Nikos Apiranthitis; Dora Masklavanou; Manousos Manousakis
- Directed by: Manousos Manousakis
- Starring: Ioannis Papazisis; Anastasia Pantousi; Tania Tripi; Konstantinos Kazakos; Takis Vamvakidis; Tatiana Papamoschou; Argiris Pantazaras; Chara Mata Giannatou
- Theme music composer: Christos Papadopoulos
- Opening theme: Kokkino Potami performed by Eleonora Zouganeli
- Ending theme: Kokkino Potami performed by Eleonora Zouganeli
- Country of origin: Greece
- Original languages: Greek; Turkish; Russian; French; German; Armenian
- No. of seasons: 2
- No. of episodes: 59

Production
- Production locations: Greece; France; Russia
- Camera setup: Multi-camera
- Running time: 41-44 minutes
- Production company: Telekinisi S.A.

Original release
- Network: Open TV
- Release: 6 October 2019 – 10 June 2023

The Red River (Greek: Το Κόκκινο Ποτάμι, Romanized: To Kokkino Potami) is a Greek-language historical television series, directed by Manousos Manousakis for Open TV in 2019, to 2023 based on the homonymous historical novel by Charis Tsirkinidis, and concerns real events surrounding the Greek Genocide.

This is the most expensive production in the history of Greek television with a total cost of over 4 million euros.

On October 6, 2019, Open TV started broadcasting To Kokkino Potami every Sunday at 9:00pm. It continued on May 24, 2020, after the break because of the COVID-19 pandemic in Greece, at 10:00pm. The last episode was broadcast on July 13, 2020.

Starred by Ioannis Papazisis, Anastasia Pantousi, Tania Tripi, Konstantinos Kazakos, Takis Vamvakidis, Tatiana Papamoschou, Argiris Pantazaras and Chara Mata Giannatou.

== Plot ==
The series is about a love story at the beginning of the 20th century, during the years of persecution of the Greeks of Pontus by the Ottoman Empire. The story begins in the town of Akdağmadeni in the Prefecture of Ankara, in May 1895, when the family of Georgios Pavlidis is engaged to their 9-year-old son, Miltos, to the 7-year-old Iphigenia, daughter of Michalis Nikolaidis.

An engagement of expediency, as was customary at that time, as, according to Muslim law, if a girl was engaged, she was considered dishonored and was not allowed to become a Muslim woman. The attacks of the fanatical Turks forced the two families to leave their place, with the Pavlidis family settling in Samsun and the Nikolaidis family in Constantinople. The two young people met by chance again in Constantinople, after 11 years and, without knowing the family relationship that binds them, they fell in love.

== Cast ==
=== Main ===
- Ioannis Papazisis as Miltiadis "Miltos" Pavlidis
- Anastasia Pantousi as Iphigenia Nikolaidi/Ayşe Yildirim/Ayşe Ömeroğlu
- Tania Tripi as Sofia Nikolaidi
- Konstantinos Kazakos as Michalis Nikolaidis
- Takis Vamvakidis as Georgios Pavlidis
- Tatiana Papamoschou as Evgenia Pavlidi
- Argiris Pantazaras as Themistoklis "Themis" Pavlidis
- Chara Mata Giannatou as Vasiliki Ioannadi/Vasiliki Pavlidi
- Giorgis Tsampourakis as Commandant Ali Ömeroğlu/Ilias
- Stefanos Kiriakidis as Metropolitan Theoklitos
- Sotiris Chatzakis as Basil Zaharoff
- Dimitris Drosos as Mehmet Kartal
- Kostas Xykominos as Onur Aslan
- Lampros Ktenavos as Osman Poiraz
- Thodoris Frantzeskos as Kerem Kartal
- Giorgos Chaleplis as Mutasarrıf of Samsun
- Dimitra Vitta as Arin
- Pavlina Zachra as Lusin
- Dimitra Sigala as Eleni Nikolaidi
- Sotiris Tsakomidis as Oguz
- Gerasimos Skiadaresis as Sultan Abdul Hamid II

=== Also main ===
- Kelli Giakoumaki as Irini Nikolaidi/Ipek
- Alexandros Moukanos as Teacher Ioannadis
- Evri Sofroniadou as Melike Ömeroğlu
- Giannis Thomas as Nedim Ömeroğlu
- Giorgos Frintzilas as Archimandrite Grigorios
- Konstantinos Tsiomidis as Panagiotis "Panaetas" Ioannadis
- Spyros Sideris as Konstantinos "Kostis" Karapesidis
- Sofia Alexanian as Domna Sachanidou
- Petra Mavridi as Chara Mavridou
- Panagos Ioakeim as Father Eytixios
- Dimitris Tsolakis as Mustafa
- Petros Xekoukis as Hotza
- Giorgos Amoutzas as Lefteris Karakostas
- Stathis Nikolaidis as Vali in Erzurum
- Aias Manthopoulos as Emir
- Anna Manta as Fatma
- Memos Koen as Turkish refugee
- Spyros Stamoulis as Murat, flag lieutenant of Vali
- Dimitris Georgiadis as Russian officer
- Aggelos Andriopoulos as Mustafa Kemal Atatürk
- Andreas Voulgaris as Athanasios Spatharis
- Giorgos Giannoutsos as Argiris

== Filming locations ==
Most of the indoors scenes were made in studios. Some scenes were shot in St. Petersburg, Russia and Paris, France. Despite much of the series being set in Pontus, Turkey many scenes that include the town of Sampsounta (Samsun) were filmed in the old town of Xanthi, in northern Greece while others were made in Trikala and Veria. Also a few scenes that include Pontians that were hanged, were shot at the former retirement home in Athens (Gyrokomeio). Also it is noted that the scenes set on the platforms of the Paris train station Gare du Nord were most probably filmed in the main railway station of Athens, Larissa Station. A fun fact is that a goat appeared while making the series and it was adopted by one of the actors who named it Potamaki.
