= Cypriot Super Cup =

- Organiser(s): Cyprus Football Association
- Founded: 1951; 75 years ago
- Region: Cyprus
- Teams: 2
- Current champions: Pafos (1st title)
- Most championships: Omonia (17 titles)
- Broadcaster: Alpha TV Cyprus
- Website: www.cfa.com.cy
- 2026 Cypriot Super Cup

The Cypriot Super Cup is a Cypriot football trophy, contested in an annual match between the previous season's Cypriot First Division champions, and the Cypriot Cup winners. The match is contested at the beginning of the football season, and is usually played at the GSP Stadium in Nicosia. The most successful team in the competition are Omonia, who have won the trophy on 17 occasions.

The current holders are Pafos who defeated Omonia 1–0 in the 2026 match.

== History ==
The first match was played in 1951, under the name Pakkos Shield (Greek: Ασπίδα Πάκκου). At the time, the trophy was not awarded to the winner of the match, but would instead be awarded to the overall most successful team in the competition, after 10 matches. The Shield was finally awarded for the first time in 1967, to Çetinkaya, who were the first club to win the trophy three times. At the time, if the league champions and the Cup winners were the same team, they were automatically named winners of the Shield.

Due to different circumstances, the competition wasn't held for 10 years, and returned in 1979 under the name Stylianakis Shield, in honor of the former president of the Cyprus Football Association. This name remained for 10 years, after which the Shield was awarded to Omonia, who won the trophy seven times in this time period.

The competition was renamed as Cyprus Football Association Shield in 1989. From 2008 until 2013, the competition was held under the name LTV Super Cup, for sponsorship reasons. Since LTV's withdrawal as the competition's sponsor in 2014, the competition is simply called the Super Cup.

== Rules ==
- If a team wins the double (the Championship and the Cup in the same season), then this team plays the runners-up of the Cypriot Cup.
- Since 2013 if no winner is determined after 90 minutes, a penalty shootout takes place.

== Cypriot Super Cup Finals ==
The table below lists all finals of the Super Cup each year:

Key to list of winners
*	Match went to extra time
†	Match decided via a penalty shoot-out after extra time
‡	Winning team won the Domestic Double (League title and Cypriot Cup) the previous season
	Winning team won the League Title the previous season
	Winning team won the Cup the previous season
(#)	Number of trophy won by club

Year	Winner	Score	Runner-up
1951	Çetinkaya Türk (1)	5–1	APOEL
1952	Çetinkaya Türk (2)	2–1	APOEL
1953	AEL Limassol (1)	4–2	EPA Larnaca
1954	Çetinkaya Türk (3)	2–1	POL
1955	EPA Larnaca (1)	4–2	AEL Limassol
1956	Not held		
1957	Not held		
1958	Not held		
1959	Not held		
1960	Not held		
1961	Not held		
1962	Anorthosis ‡ (1)	–	–
1963	APOEL (1)	1–0	Anorthosis
1964	Not held		
1965	Not held		
1966	Omonia (1)	3–1	Apollon Limassol
1967	Olympiakos Nicosia (1)	1–0	Apollon Limassol
1968	AEL Limassol (2)	2–1	APOEL
1969	Not held		
1970	Not held		
1971	Not held		
1972	Not held		
1973	Not held		
1974	Not held		
1975	Not held		
1976	Not held		
1977	Not held		
1978	Not held		
1979	Omonia (2)	3–0	APOEL
1980	Omonia (3)	2–1 *	APOEL
1981	Omonia ‡(4)	4–1	ENP
1982	Omonia ‡(5)	2–0	Apollon Limassol
1983	Omonia ‡ (6)	3–1	ENP
1984	APOEL (2)	3–2	Omonia
1985	AEL Limassol (3)	1–0	Omonia
1986	APOEL (3)	6–5 *	Apollon Limassol
1987	Omonia (7)	2–1	AEL Limassol
1988	Omonia (8)	1–0 *	POL
1989	Omonia (9)	3–1 *	AEL Limassol
1990	Nea Salamina (1)	1–0	APOEL
1991	Omonia (10)	4–0	Apollon Limassol
1992	APOEL (4)	3–0	Apollon Limassol
1993	APOEL (5)	4–3	Omonia
1994	Omonia (11)	2–1	Apollon Limassol
1995	Anorthosis (2)	1–1 † (Note: Score was 1–1 after extra time. Anorthosis won the penalty shoot-out 5–4.)	APOEL
1996	APOEL ‡ (6)	1–0	AEK Larnaca
1997	APOEL (7)	2–1	Anorthosis
1998	Anorthosis ‡ (3)	4–1	Apollon Limassol
1999	Anorthosis (4)	2–0	APOEL
2000	Anorthosis (5)	2–1	Omonia

Season	Winner	Score	Runner-up
2001	Omonia (12)	1–0	Apollon Limassol
2002	APOEL (8)	6–3	Anorthosis
2003	Omonia (13)	3–2	Anorthosis
2004	APOEL (9)	5–4 *	AEK Larnaca
2005	Omonia (14)	2–2 † (Note: Score was 2–2 after extra time. Omonia won the penalty shoot-out 5–4.)	Anorthosis
2006	Apollon Limassol (1)	3–1 *	APOEL
2007	Anorthosis (6)	2–1	APOEL
2008	APOEL (10)	1–0	Anorthosis
2009	APOEL (11)	2–1	APOP Kinyras
2010	Omonia (15)	1–1 † (Note: Score was 1–1 after extra time. Omonia won the penalty shoot-out 3–2.)	Apollon Limassol
2011	APOEL (12)	1–0	Omonia
2012	Omonia (16)	5–3	AEL Limassol
2013	APOEL (13)	1–0	Apollon Limassol
2014	Ermis Aradippou (1)	2–1	APOEL
2015	AEL Limassol (4)	0–0 † (Note: Score was 0–0 after extra time. AEL Limassol won the penalty shoot-out 4–3.)	APOEL
2016	Apollon Limassol (2)	2–1	APOEL
2017	Apollon Limassol (3)	2–1	APOEL
2018	AEK Larnaca (2)	1–1 † (Note: Score was 1–1 after extra time. AEK Larnaca won the penalty shoot-out 4–1.)	APOEL
2019	APOEL (14)	1–0	AEL Limassol
2020	Not held		
2021	Omonia (17)	1–1 † (Note: Score was 1–1 after extra time. Omonia won the penalty shoot-out 3–2.)	Anorthosis
2022	Apollon Limassol (4)	2–0	Omonia
2023	Aris Limassol (1)	2–0	Omonia
2024	APOEL (15)	1–0	Pafos
2025	AEK Larnaca (3)	1–1 † (Note: Score was 1–1 after extra time. AEK Larnaca won the penalty shoot-out 5–4.)	Pafos
2026	Pafos (1)	1–0	Omonia

Notes:

- Following a decision by the Executive Committee of the Cyprus Football Association (CFA/KOP), upon the opinion of its legal advisor, on 19 June 2025, a request by AEK Larnaca was approved for the recognition of the titles of EPA Larnaca and Pezoporikos Larnaca in the name of AEK Larnaca.
- From 1951-1955, 1962-1963 & 1966-1968 it was called the Pakkos Shield.
- From 1979-1988 it was called the Stylianakis Shield.
- From 1989-2007 it was called the Cyprus FA Shield.
- From 2008-2013 it was called the LTV Super Cup.
- From 2013 onwards, its called the Super Cup.

== Performances ==
=== Performance by club ===
Club	Winners	Runners-up	Winning years
Omonia	17	8	1966, 1979, 1980, 1981, 1982, 1983, 1987, 1988, 1989, 1991, 1994, 2001, 2003, 2005, 2010, 2012, 2021
APOEL	15	15	1963, 1984, 1986, 1992, 1993, 1996, 1997, 2002, 2004, 2008, 2009, 2011, 2013, 2019, 2024
Anorthosis Famagusta	6	7	1962, 1995, 1998, 1999, 2000, 2007
Apollon Limassol	4	11	2006, 2016, 2017, 2022
AEL Limassol	4	5	1953, 1968, 1985, 2015
AEK Larnaca (Note: Includes wins and runner-ups of EPA Larnaca FC and Pezoporikos Larnaca FC until 1994.)	3	5	1955, 2018, 2025
Çetinkaya Türk	3	–	1951, 1952, 1954
Pafos	1	2	2026
Aris Limassol	1	–	2023
Ermis Aradippou	1	–	2014
Nea Salamina	1	–	1990
Olympiakos Nicosia	1	–	1967
Enosis Neon Paralimni	–	2	–
APOP Kinyras	–	1	–

Notes:

- Following a decision by the Executive Committee of the Cyprus Football Association (CFA/KOP), upon the opinion of its legal advisor, on 19 June 2025, a request by AEK Larnaca was approved for the recognition of the titles of EPA Larnaca and Pezoporikos Larnaca in the name of AEK Larnaca.
