= Open TV =

Greek television channel

- Country: Greece
- Broadcast area: National
- Headquarters: Paiania, Greece

Programming
- Language: Greek
- Picture format: 1080i HDTV (downscaled to 16:9 576i for the SDTV feed)

Ownership
- Owner: Radiotelevision S.A.; (a subsidiary of Dimera Media Investments, a company of Ivan Savvidis)
- Sister channels: Plus TV

History
- Launched: 1990–2013 (as 902 TV); 2013–2018 (as Epsilon TV); 2018–present (as Open TV)
- Replaced: 902 TV (1990–2013)
- Former names: Epsilon TV (2013–2018)

Links
- Website: Official Website

Availability

Terrestrial
- Digea: All over Greece at local frequencies

Streaming media
- Open TV: Live TV

Former logo (2 February - 23 October 2018)

Open TV, formerly Epsilontv, is a Greek free-to-air television station, based in Paiania, East Attica.

== History ==
It belonged to Radio-television S.A. which was sold from Communist Party of Greece to the Cypriot offshore company A-Orizon Media Ltd. under contract came on 31 July 2013, and replaced the 902 channel. The operation began on 11 September 2013, at 00:10 with broadcast Entertainment Gossip News with presenter Maria Louisa Vourou.

The first station's newscast sent out the same day at 19:30 pm, with main presenter journalist George Karameros. Since October 2013 the channel has a full schedule, including Press News, information, entertainment, cultural and sports programs. George Tragas for a few months showed the program State of Siege and subsequently Restricted Area. Also presented program Without Anesthetic and Sniper. Since September 2014, the main news program has been presented by Lina Klitou. In 2017, the channel was sold to Ivan Savvidis. Filippos Vrionis was the former owner.

== Broadcasting signaling ==
The E Channel began broadcasting from its platform Digea on 11 September 2013. On 22 November 2013 the channel joined the Cable platform Nova Greece at position 114 and Nova Cyprus at position 613 and from 15 December 2014, and joined the Cable platform of Cosmote TV at position 111. On the afternoon of 8 March 2016 officially launched the E Channel to broadcast in high definition (HD). Also, old Epsilon TV has been working with Greek New Epsilon TV, Extra Channel and Cypriot Plus TV.

== Controversies ==
The Open TV program "Ευτυχείτε" (Eutixeite, lit. "happenings") and its host Katerina Kainourgiou were criticized due to her and the show's guests ridiculing South Korean pop singers Oh Se-hun, Kang Daniel, V and Jungkook who made it on a list of "the 100 most handsome faces of 2018".

== Current programs ==
=== Daytime ===
==== Talk shows ====
- Poios einai Proiniatika? (Who is so morning?) (2021-today)
- Open Weekend (2021-today)
- Mera Mesimeri me ti Marion (In broad daylight with Marion) (2022-today)

==== Former shows ====
===== Soap operas =====
- I Teleftaia Ora (2021-2022)
- O Prigkipas tis Fotias (2018-2019)

===== Game shows =====
- Joker (2020-2021)
- Enas gia olous! (2019-2020)
- Poios rotaei? (2018-2019)

===== Talk and variety shows =====
- Glam Wars (2021-2022)
- Familiar (2021)
- Milise mou (2021)
- Green Kitchen by Madame Ginger (2021)
- Radio Arvyla (2021)
- Style me up (2020-2021)
- The Booth (2020)
- Kitchen' Health (2020)
- Open Ellada (2020)
- Annita Koita (2019-2021)
- Mesimeri Yes (2019-2020)
- Me to N & me to S (2019)
- Ola lathos (2019)
- Studio Open (2019)
- Mesimeriatika (2019)
- Ela Xamogela! (2018-2021)
- Eftixeite (2018-2021)
- Top Story (2018-2019)
- Kouzina gia dyo (2018-2019)
- Gia tin parea (2018-2019)

=== Primetime / Late night ===
==== Talk shows ====
- After Dark with Themis Georgantas (2021–present)
- Anoixta with Annita Pania (2021–present)
- Total Football (2018–present)

==== Others ====
- Taxi with Dionysis Atzarakis (2021–present)
- Ena tragoudi akoma with Giorgos Theofanous (2021–present)
- Eikones with Tasos Dousis (2019–present)

==== Former shows ====
===== Talk shows =====
- Aples Kouventes (2021)
- The Grandmother with Ieroklis Mihailidis (2021)
- Gramma gia sena with Viky Hatzivasileiou (2020)
- Info-19 with Niki Lymperaki (2020)
- Open Mind with Elli Stai (2019)

===== Others =====
- I Proklisi (2021-2022)
- Into your heart with Giorgos Mavridis (2021-2022)
- Into the skin with Giorgos Mavridis (2021)
- Kai Egeneto Ellas (2020-2021)
- Just the 2 of Us (2020)
- Paggenger (2019-2020)
- My Greece with Despina Vandi (2019-2020)
- The X Factor (2019)
- Revenge Body with Ioanna Lili (2019)
- Al Sihtiri with Lakis Lazopoulos (2019)
- Al Tsantiri News with Lakis Lazopoulos (2019)
- It's Show Time! with Nikos Koklonis (2019)
- Oi peirates tou Aigaiou (2019)
- Project Runaway Greece (2018-2019)

===== Series =====
- To Kokkino Potami (2019-2020)
- Gia Panta Paidia (2018-2019)
- Eleftheri Sxesi (2018-2019)
- Ou Fonefseis (2018-2019)
