= Athina Sat =

Cyopriod satellite pay TV service

- Company type: Private
- Industry: Telecommunications
- Founded: May 2005
- Defunct: March 2008
- Headquarters: Engomi, Nicosia, Cyprus
- Area served: Cyprus
- Products: Direct Broadcast Satellite
- Owner: Athina Sat TV Ltd.
- Website: Athina Sat

Athina Sat was a Cypriot digital satellite pay television service owned by the limited company of the same name. Launched in May 2005 and was the first Cypriot-owned DTH satellite provider in Cyprus. It was one of two satellite platforms, the other being Nova.

Athina Sat offered Cypriot subscribers an array of programming choices from News, Sports, Movies, Children's, Entertainment as well as popular Cypriot TV networks.

In March 2008 Athinsat decided to shut its doors due to the loss of several channels, including popular Cypriot networks LTV, and Alfa TV, which re-signed with Nova.

== Channels ==
Athina Sat offered over 30 channels in its line-up, from Greece, Europe and abroad as well as several FTA channels. The Current line-up of channels:

Foreign channels

- BBC Entertainment
- CNA
- CNN International
- Čarli TV
- Cartoon Network
- Eurosport 1
- Eurosport 2
- M2
- TCM

Greek-language channels

- 902 TV
- Alfa TV
- ERT World
- LTV
- LTV Races
- PIK Sat
- Sigma TV
- Skai TV
- TV Magic
- Vouli TV
