= Giorgis Tsampourakis =

Greek actor

- Born: Georgios Tsampourakis; October 31, 1974 (age 51); Düsseldorf, North Rhine-Westphalia, Germany
- Citizenship: Greek, German
- Occupations: Actor, producer
- Years active: 2001–present
- Children: 2

Giorgis Tsampourakis (Greek: Γιωργής Τσαμπουράκης; born October 31, 1974) is a Greek actor and producer.

== Biography ==
Tsampourakis was born on October 31, 1974, in Düsseldorf. He is the son of Ioanni and Irini Tsampouraki, who came from Avgeniki, Heraklion, Crete.

He graduated from the School of Dramatic Art Veaki. In 2001 he made his TV debut in the series Ti simvainei me ton Chari. In 2005 he starred in the series Ston Ilio tou Aigaiou. In 2019 he starred in To Kokkino Potami.

He is married and has two children. He is the owner of the restaurant "ASTER" in Petralona, together with his friend and actor Michalis Moulakakis.

He is the founder and director of the theater company "Imeros" and the Higher School of Dramatic Art "NOTOS" in Heraklion, Crete.

== Filmography ==
| Year | Title | Role | Notes |
|---|---|---|---|
| 2001 | Ti simvainei me ton Chari | Giannis | Episode: "Ego kai o filos mou Renos" |
| 2005 | Kaneis den leei s' agapo | Petros | 2 episode |
| 2005/06 | Meine dipla mou | Timotheos | Main Cast |
| 2005/06 | Ston Ilio tou Aigaiou | Aris | Leading role |
| 2006/07 | I Teleutaia Parastasi | Antonis Argiriadis | Leading role |
| 2007/08 | Pira Kokkina Gialia | Sakis Christodoulou | Leading role |
| 2008 | Alithinoi Erotes | Pavlos Anagnostou | Episode: "Mezoneta" |
| 2008/09 | Exo ena mistiko... | Telis | 9 episode |
| 2009 | Alithinoi Erotes | Giorgos | Episode: "Parania" |
| 2009/11 | Karma | Filippos | Leading role |
| 2010 | Ouk An Laveis Para Tou Mi Exontos | Factory Master (voice) | 1 episode |
| 2014 | Klemmena Oneira | Miltos Kriezis | Main Cast |
| 2016/17 | Tamam | Thanos Iakovou | 8 episode |
| 2019/20 | To Kokkino Potami | Ali Omeroglu | Leading role |

=== Movies ===
| Year | Title | Role |
|---|---|---|
| 2008 | O Arsivaristas kai o Aggelos | Manolis |
| 2013 | Big Bad Sheep | |

== Theatre ==
- Bend
- Alloi antropoi
- O Elafovasilias
- To aima pou marathike
- Oidipodas
- Oresteia
- Filla apo Giali
- Basilias Lir
- O thanatos tou Danton
- Erotokritos
- Perses
- Kaligoulas
- O Vasilikos
- Odysseia
- Oi Tris Adelfes
- Ena mathima xorou
- Mon petit prince
- Fool for love
- O Theios Vanya
- Nora
