= Christodoulos Neophytou =

Christodoulos Neophytou (Greek: Χριστόδουλος Νεοφύτου, born 29 May 1950) is a Cypriot economist who was born in Famagusta and now lives in London, England.

He studied Applied Economics in London. Institute Of Marketing London, IAH. Yacht Master RYA UK.

He was a candidate for the 2008 Cypriot presidential elections.
