= Monaco Telecom =

Telecommunications provider in the Principality of Monaco

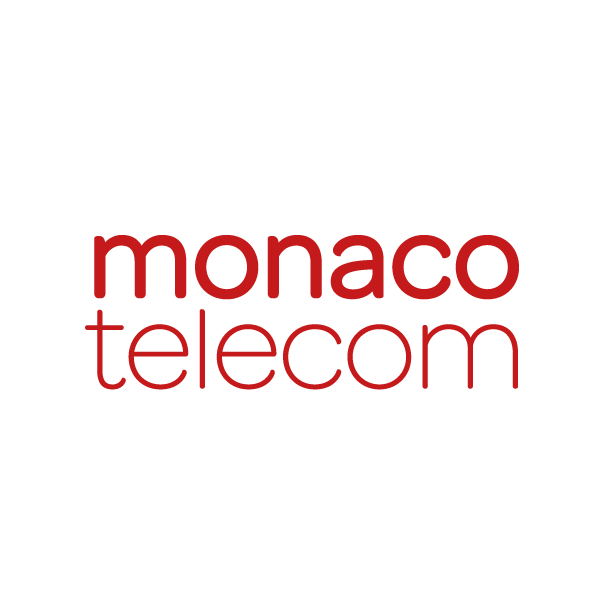
- Type: Société Anonyme Monégasque (SAM)
- Industry: Telecommunications
- Predecessor: Office Monégasque des Téléphones
- Founded: 1997; 29 years ago
- Headquarters: Monaco
- Key people: Etienne Franzi (Chairman of the Board); Martin Péronnet (CEO)
- Revenue: 149.9 million euros (2015)
- Net income: 52.1 million euros (2015)
- Owners: Xavier Niel through NJJ Holding (55%); Government of Monaco (45%)
- Number of employees: 226
- Subsidiaries: Epic (Malta); Epic (Cyprus)
- Website: www.monaco-telecom.mc

Monaco Telecom is the primary telecommunications provider in the Principality of Monaco. Established in 1997, the company was formed following the government of Monaco's decision to privatize the previously state-owned Office Monégasque des Téléphones. Monaco Telecom provides various services including internet access and mobile phone services. It is a key entity in facilitating communication within Monaco and connecting the principality to global telecommunications networks. Additionally, the company operates a retail store which functions as a point of service and customer interaction.

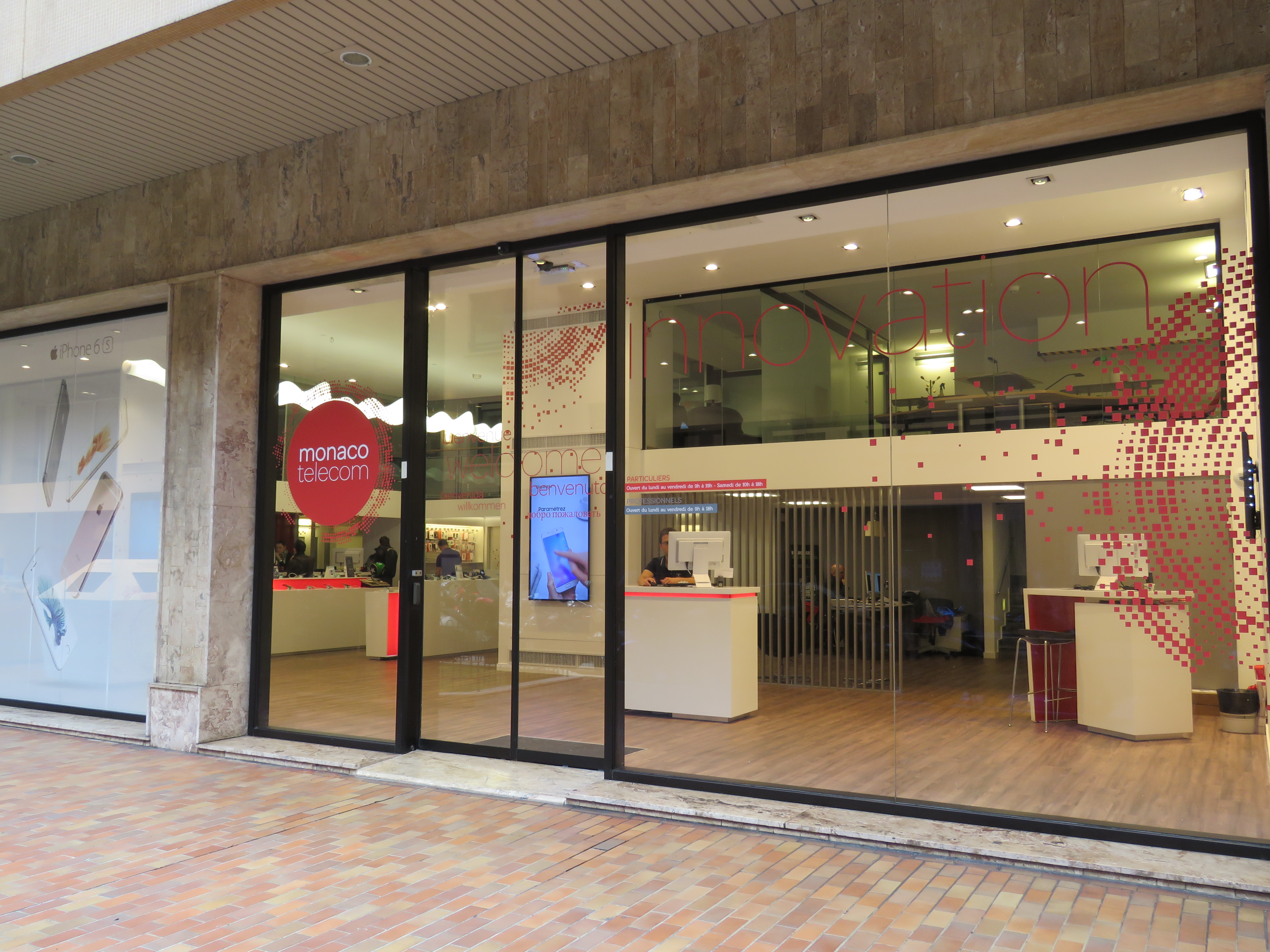
Monaco Telecom store

== International development ==
=== Africa ===
In August 2012, Monaco Telecom sold its stake in its subsidiary, Afinis Communications - a Casablanca, Morocco-based telecommunications provider serving Africa's largest corporations - to SkyVision. In September of the same year, the Planor/Kome CESSE/Monaco Telecom consortium was awarded Mali's third mobile telephone licence. Monaco Telecom is the technical partner in the consortium, which operates through the Malian company, Alpha Telecom Mali.

=== Asia ===
Monaco Telecom owned a 36.75% stake in Roshan, Afghanistan's leading telecommunications provider, and was the technical lead for the deployment of the Roshan's mobile-telephone network in Afghanistan. Deployment of the network was completed in July 2003. In Afghanistan, which is currently undergoing massive reconstruction, Monaco Telecom also offered a range of complementary telecommunications services, including ISP data networks, leased lines, call centres, and emergency numbers. Monaco Telecom sold its 36.75% stake to AKFED in August 2020, making it the sole owner. Monaco Telecom also has an office in Dubai, in the United Arab Emirates.

=== Europe ===
Cyprus: Since 2018, Monaco Telecom owns Epic (formerly MTN Cyprus) which is one of the largest telecommunication providers in Cyprus with a recorded share of broadband access at 47.8% in 2019. Epic provides integrated mobile and fixed telephony, internet and pay-TV services as well as solutions for businesses. It currently operates 18 stores across all major cities on the island.

Kosovo: Monaco Telecom won a 1999 United Nations contract to deploy and extend the Kosovo Telecom GSM network in Kosovo. Today, the mobile network covers over 99% of the population, with more than 1.2 million subscribers. In 2012 the Kosovo mobile telephony contract was extended for a further 3 years.

Malta: In December 2019, Monaco Telecom agreed to acquire Vodafone Malta for a cash consideration equivalent to an enterprise value of €250 million; the acquisition was accomplished on 31 March 2020. On 17 November 2020 Vodafone Malta was renamed Epic.

Monaco: Monaco Telecom offers Monegasque residents and companies the entire range of products and services expected of a major telecommunications company. Through a concession agreement with Principality, the company holds the monopoly for fixed-line telephone services, internet access and television services while the mobile telephony market is entirely open to competition. Monaco Telecom currently owns and operates 2 sales outlets in Monaco.

Sector	Number of customers
Fixed	22 096
Mobile lines	42 800

== OnAir Communications ==
Since 2006, Monaco Telecom has been providing OnAir with infrastructure enabling in-flight connectivity—via GSM and IP networks—on several Airbus aircraft. In June 2006, OnAir extended its agreement with Monaco Telecom to include the development and management of its entire land-based network supporting GSM and GPRS calls originating from anywhere in the world. The first in-flight tests, on a commercial flight, were conducted in December 2007. By the end of 2011, the OnAir system was available in about a hundred aircraft operated by about fifteen companies. In June 2010, Monaco Telecom and OnAir broadened their range of services to include a new offer OnMarine extending the maritime communications network.

== Research and development ==
Monaco Telecom is a member of Eurecom, an engineering school and communication systems research centre based in Sophia Antipolis, France.

== Shareholders ==
Monaco Telecom is 51.2% owned by Xavier Niel, founder and largest shareholder of the Paris based Iliad SA. The principality of Monaco owns the remaining 49.8% through the wholly owned Société Nationale de Financement.

== Key dates ==
- 2024: Since January 31, 2024, no residents have accessed the internet via the copper network in the Principality.
- 2021: The Fiber network is deployed across the entire territory and the offers marketed for individuals and businesses in Monaco. n May, the Monegasque State renewed its public concession with Monaco Télécom for twenty years.
- 2020: On 31 March Monaco Telecom acquires Vodafone Malta.
- 2019: On 9 July Monaco Telecom launched its 5G network in conjunction with the presentation of the commercial offer. Within the same year the company has re-branded its MTN acquisition in Cyprus as epic
- 2018: On 16 July Monaco Telecom acquires MTN Cyprus.
- 2015: On 8 September Monaco Telecom launched the ultra high speed broadband service using DOSCIS 3.0. Speed reaches 1Gbit down and 200Mbit up.

Launch of LTE advanced in Monaco.
Introduction of a new logo and a new visual identity.

- 2014 : Acquisition of Monaco Telecom by Xavier Niel, (founder and majority shareholder of the French Internet service provider and Mobile operator Iliad trading under the Free brand)

African group Azur Telecom chose Monaco Telecom to accompany him in his development.

- 2013 : Monaco Telecom and global carrier Level 3 signed a strategic agreement for international connectivity

Launch of LTE in Monaco.

- 2012 : the Planor/Kome CESSE/Monaco Telecom consortium was awarded Mali's third mobile telephone licence.

Monaco Telecom sold its stake in its subsidiary Afinis Communications to SkyVision.
Kosovo mobile-telephony contract extended for a further 3 years.

- 2011 : Monaco Telecom launches its 4G LTE pilot service.

Provides circuit-wide WiFi coverage for the Monaco Formula 1 Grand Prix.
Education & Research: Eurecom names its future Class of 2011-2012, "Monaco Telecom".
The Open des Artistes de Monaco art competition: artists' contributions illustrate the telephone directory of the Principality.
Monaco Telecom and Cable&Wireless Communications announce the formation of Afinis Communications, following the merger of Divona's and Connecteo's sales operation.

- 2010 : OnAir and Monaco Telecom launch OnMarine, an extended maritime communications service.

Monaco Telecom partners with Eurecom.
Launches 30MB high-speed broadband and full digital TV services.

- 2009 : Outdoor demonstration of mobile WiMax technology in Monaco.

Martin Péronnet appointed as CEO (5 January 2009).

- 2008 : Monaco Telecom sells 60% of its stake in its call centre, eCALL.

Acquires Connecteo, a VDI service provider with operations in 6 African countries.
CWI selects Monaco Telecom to establish its first mobile WiMax Centre of Excellence, in partnership with Alvarion, Cisco and Nokia.

- 2007 : Monaco Telecom unifies its four core service offerings (landline and mobile telephony, internet and television) under the Monaco Telecom brand, and changes its corporate visual identity.
- 2006 : Monaco Telecom opens an office in Dubai.
- 2005 : OnAir selects Monaco Telecom for its land-based infrastructure (in-flight GSM telephony services).
- 2004 : U.K.-based Cable & Wireless International buys Vivendi Telecom International's stake in Monaco Telecom.

Monaco Telecom sets up two satellite telecommunications subsidiaries in the Maghreb: Tunisia-based Divona Telecom and Divona in Algeria.

- 2003 : Signs mobile network management services agreement with Afghanistan-based Roshan.
- 1999 : Awarded mobile network management services contract in Kosovo.

Vivendi Telecom International acquires 51% stake in Monaco Telecom.

- 1997 : Government of Monaco privatizes Office Monégasque des Téléphones and forms Monaco Telecom.
- 1996 : The Principality of Monaco assigned its own country calling code (377).
- 1994 : GSM network deployed in the Principality.
- 1890 : First public telephones in the Principality of Monaco.

== Corporate responsibility ==
For several years Monaco Telecom has spearheaded initiatives to measure electromagnetic field intensities to reassure the public that its installations do not pose a health risk. As of November 2010, electromagnetic wave emissions are regulated under Monegasque legislation, itself inspired by the most stringent regulations in the industry, i.e., an electric-field intensity threshold of 6 Volts/metre for radio antenna, television, walkie-talkie, and WiFi emissions, and 4 Volts/metre for mobile-telephone relay antennas. Compliance with threshold values is monitored by the government-run DCE (Direction des Communications Electroniques) during annual measurement campaigns, or whenever new mobile radio frequency emitting equipment is brought into service.
