= Epic (Malta) =

Maltese telecommunications company

Epic Communications Limited
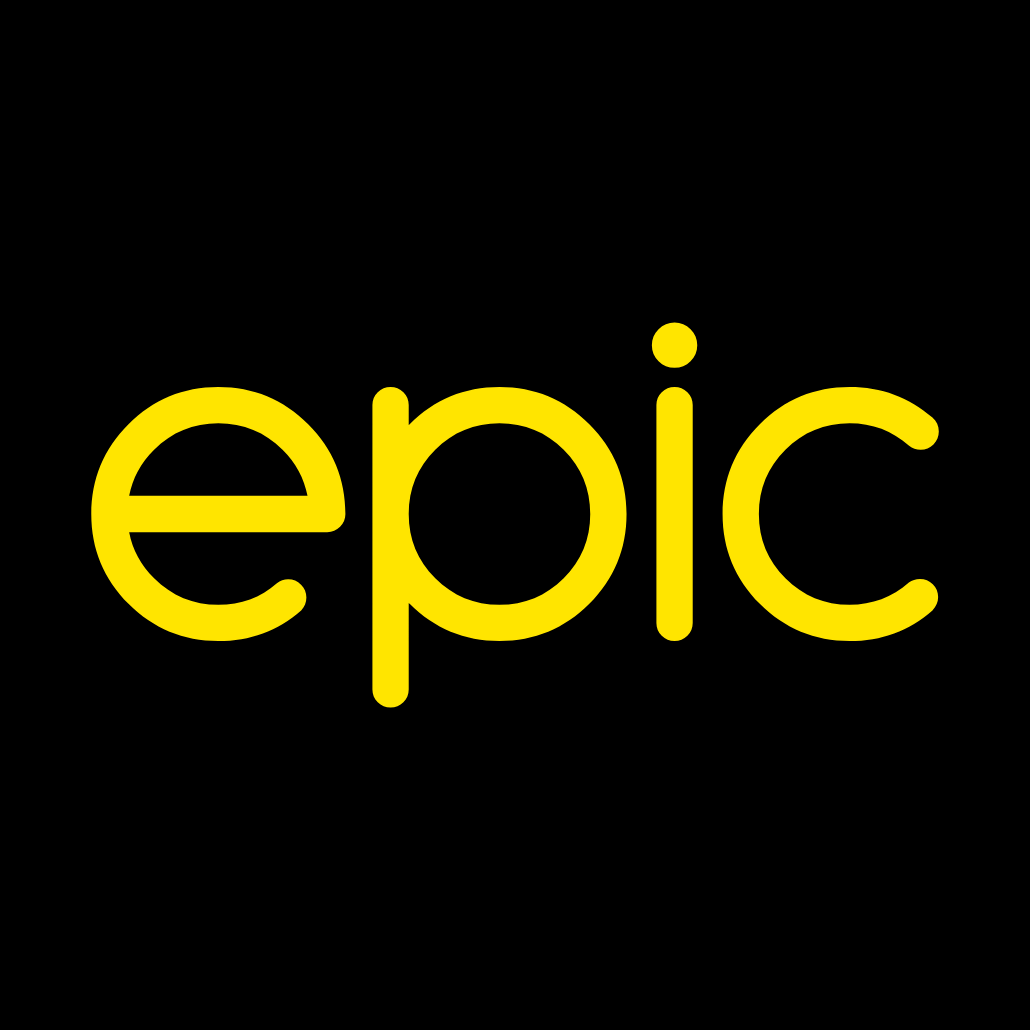
- Formerly: Telecell Limited (1989-1997); Vodafone Limited (1997-2020)
- Type: Subsidiary
- Industry: Telecommunications
- Founded: 1989; 37 years ago
- Headquarters: Luqa, Malta
- Area served: Malta
- Key people: Pierre-Etienne Cizeron (CEO)
- Products: Mobile telephony; Fixed telephony
- Owner: Monaco Telecom (100%)
- Number of employees: 319
- Parent: Monaco Telecom
- Website: www.epic.com.mt

Epic Communications Limited (from 1989 to 1997 Telecell Limited, and then from 1997 to 2020 Vodafone Limited) is a Maltese mobile network operator, and the largest mobile network in Malta by number of customers.

The company offers a full range of Voice, SMS and mobile Data services over 2G, 3G, 4G, 4G+ and 5G networks.

== History ==
=== Telecell (1989-1997) ===
Telecell was established in 1989 as the first mobile network provider in Malta. The first call was made on the Telecell network in 1990 whilst the first GSM call was made in 1997.

=== Vodafone (1997-2020) ===
In 1997 Telecell was rebranded as Vodafone^{[citation needed]}.

Vodafone Malta's international gateway was launched in 2004 making it the first company in Malta to offer resilience and backup on international connectivity to the local business community. The international gateway spans approximately 250 km between Malta and Catania carrying three main types of traffic: Internet, Voice and Data. During August 2006, Vodafone was the first mobile network operator to deploy 3G followed by the launch of HSDPA for high speed data transmission in December 2006. In June 2007, Vodafone Malta launched fixed broadband based on WiMax technologies.

In 2008, Vodafone opened its Mobile Network to Virtual Network Operators. This was made possible through an agreement with ASPIDER Solutions. One of the virtual operators using the Vodafone network is Redtouch Fone. In 2010, Vodafone added another first when it announced the launch of an even faster mobile data service with nationwide download speeds of 14.4 Mbit/s. In 2012, another first for Malta was launched by Vodafone. The new 21.6 Mbit/s HSPA capability was launched live across all of Vodafone's coverage area. Vodafone started also rolling out the very latest 42 Mbit/s capability across key areas and high traffic sites on its network. Vodafone Malta announced its roll out of a 4G network in October 2013. It is the first mobile operator in Malta with an operating 4G network and in June 2017 Vodafone Malta has announced 4G+.

In 2017, Vodafone became the first network to introduce superfast 4.5G to the Maltese islands, making it the country's fastest network. The new technology allows for the downloading of data at unprecedented speeds – 33 per cent faster than any other network available in Malta and Gozo – at 300 Mbit/s.

In October 2018, Vodafone Malta introduced NB-IoT (narrow band IoT) to Malta bringing the next generation IoT technology to the local market.

On 19 December 2019, Vodafone Group announced that it has entered into an agreement to sell 100% of Vodafone Malta to Monaco Telecom for a cash consideration equivalent to an Enterprise Value of €250 million; the sale was accomplished on 31 March 2020.

=== Epic (since 2020) ===
On November 17, 2020, the company changed its name into Epic, and announced that it would be the first company in Malta that would not rely on lock-in contracts.

== Head Office ==
Epic Communications Limited's head office is located in SkyParks Business Centre, at the Malta International Airport. The company also operates a number of retail outlets across the Maltese Islands offering a range of customer services. On 11 November 2014, the company opened its first destination store in Malta. The store occupies 417 sq metres and is situated on the Birkirkara Bypass.

== Foundation ==
The Foundation was set up in 2003 and is a separate entity from epic's commercial organisation. The Foundation focuses on supporting projects that make a difference to the Maltese community. Its prime objective is to partner up with NGOs and co-create, support and fund projects that fall under the Connecting for Good Programme. The aim of this programme is to harness the power of innovative mobile technology to bring about social change. Gemma Mifsud Bonnici was chairperson of the foundation until 2015. Michel Macelli replaced Bonnici as chairperson.
