= Kostas Themistocleous =

Cypriot politician

- Κώστας Θεμιστοκλέους
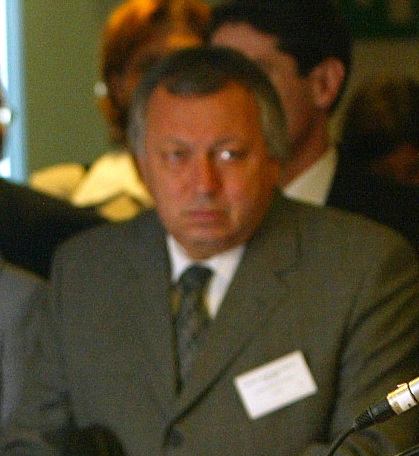
- Themistocleous in 2002

Minister of Agriculture, Natural Resources and Environment
- President: Glafcos Clerides
- Preceded by: Andreas Mantovanis
- Succeeded by: Timis Efthymiou

Personal details
- Born: 1949 (age 76–77)
- Party: United Democrats
- Spouse: Avgi Lymbouri

Kostas Themistocleous (Greek: Κώστας Θεμιστοκλέους; born 1949) is a Cypriot politician.

He studied economics and political sciences in Athens. He also studied MSc Economics Developing in London.

He is married with Avgi Lymbouri and has two daughters and one son.

Themistocleous was Minister of Agriculture, Natural Resources and Environment in the government of Glafcos Clerides. A member of the United Democrats, he was an independent candidate in the 2008 Cypriot presidential election, obtaining 0.17% of the vote.

He was one of the supporters of the Annan Plan for Cyprus.
