= ASPIDER =

Dutch mobile technology company

- Type: Privately held company
- Industry: Telecom
- Founded: 2000 in Driebruggen NL
- Headquarters: Woerden, The Netherlands
- Number of employees: 50-100
- Website: www.aspider.com

ASPIDER is the group name for a series of companies that are mostly based in Europe. The company name has evolved over the years as a result of acquisitions, mergers and restructuring. The company is an MVNE (Mobile Virtual Network Enabler), providing mobile services to companies that want to control their own network. Clients include enterprises, manufacturers, integrators, and the mobile operators themselves.

== History ==
Following the merger of ASPIDER and MEC Solutions in 2004, the company traded as ASPIDER Solutions. Following the acquisition of NGI in 2014 the company traded as ASPIDER-NGI. ASPIDER sold aspects of its M2M business in 2010 to Wyless (which was subsequently purchased by Kore Wireless).

ASPIDER is traditionally known as a Mobile Virtual Network Enabler (MVNE), delivering services to a variety of operators and MVNOs and MNOs (Postmobile, Vodafone and T-Mobile). More recently, the company has been delivering services to Enterprises, Manufacturers and other MVNEs (SURFnet, and has announced partnerships with other companies for the use of eSIM in IoT initiatives (IDEMIA, Oracle).

ASPIDER's promotion of eSIM is notable because, when the initial specifications were announced, they were limited mainly to use-cases around operator selection and Remote SIM provisioning. ASPIDER has promoted additional use cases more for enterprise applications - like authentication and identity management. The company has been working with industry groups like BTG to get pilots off the ground with companies like SURFnet.

== Operations ==
ASPIDER operated from a number of datacenters around the world and the largest of these was based in Malta. The Maltese operation included a full core network that interconnected to a number of operators, in particular with Vodafone Malta in order to launch a number of MVNOs in Malta. The core network components featured the usual manufacturers in Cisco and Oracle, but also smaller specialist vendors like Blueslice and BroadForward. ASPIDER had also acquired technologies from eSERVGlobal for a variety of messaging and communications components.

== Locations ==
The company headquarters are in the Netherlands, with offices in Belgium, UK, USA, France, New Zealand and Malta. In previous years the company also had offices in Seattle (US), Ireland and Egypt.
