= Iphigenia (film) =

- Film poster
- Directed by: Michael Cacoyannis
- Screenplay by: Michael Cacoyannis
- Based on: Iphigenia in Aulis by Euripides
- Produced by: Michael Cacoyannis
- Starring: Irene Papas; Tatiana Papamoschou; Kostas Kazakos
- Cinematography: Giorgos Arvanitis
- Edited by: Takis Yanopoulos
- Music by: Mikis Theodorakis
- Production company: Greek Film Center
- Distributed by: Cinema V (USA)
- Release date: 1 October 1977
- Running time: 127 minutes
- Country: Greece
- Language: Greek

Iphigenia (Greek: Ιφιγένεια) is a 1977 Greek tragedy film directed by Michael Cacoyannis, based on the Greek myth of Iphigenia, the daughter of Agamemnon and Clytemnestra, who was ordered by the goddess Artemis to be sacrificed. Cacoyannis adapted the film, the third in his "Greek Tragedy" trilogy (after the release of Electra in 1962 and The Trojan Women in 1971), from his stage production of Euripides' play Iphigenia in Aulis. The film stars Tatiana Papamoschou as Iphigenia, Kostas Kazakos as Agamemnon and Irene Papas as Clytemnestra. The score was composed by Mikis Theodorakis.

Iphigenia was nominated for one Oscar, Best Foreign Language Film. It was also nominated for the Palme d'Or at the 1977 Cannes Film Festival. Iphigenia received the 1978 Belgian Femina Award and received the Best Film Award at the 1977 Thessaloniki Film Festival, where Tatiania Papamoschou also received the Best Leading Actress Award for her role as Iphigenia.

== Plot ==
Iphigenia tells the story of an event just before the Trojan War. Helen, Menelaus' wife, ran away to Troy with Paris, Priam's son. Agamemnon, Menelaus' brother and the King of Argos, gathered a large Greek expedition at Aulis to retrieve Helen. However, Artemis, angered by an offense from Agamemnon's father, King Atreus, caused storms to hinder the Greek fleet. This sets the stage for the film's beginning.

The Greek armies have been waiting for what feels like an eternity for the winds to rise and blow eastward, carrying their boats to Troy. The men are tired, bored, hungry, and eager for battle. In an attempt to appease them, Agamemnon (Kostas Kazakos) allows them to take sheep from a nearby temple dedicated to Artemis. In the chaos that ensues, Artemis' sacred deer is accidentally killed. This angers Calchas (Dimitris Aronis), the high priest of Artemis' temple, who delivers an oracle to Agamemnon in the presence of Menelaus (Costas Karras) and Odysseus (Christos Tsagas). According to Calchas, the oracle, believed to be from Artemis herself, demands that Agamemnon offer a sacrifice to atone for the defilement of the holy ground and the killing of the sacred stag. Once the sacrifice is made, Artemis will allow the winds to blow eastward, permitting the armies to sail to Troy. The sacrifice demanded is Agamemnon's first-born daughter, Iphigenia (Tatiana Papamoschou). News of "the deal" spreads quickly among the army, although the exact nature of the sacrifice remains temporarily unknown to them.

After a heated argument between the two brothers, Agamemnon sends a message to his wife, Clytemnestra (Irene Papas), in Argos. In the letter, Agamemnon requests that his wife send their daughter, Iphigenia, alone to Aulis, supposedly to marry Achilles (Panos Mihalopoulos). Achilles, the leader of the Myrmidon army, is part of Agamemnon's expeditionary forces. Despite her husband's instructions, Clytemnestra decides to accompany her daughter to Aulis.

From this point on, the tension and tragedy intensify. Agamemnon begins to doubt his plan. After admitting his deception to his old servant (Angelos Yannoulis), Agamemnon sends him with another letter to Clytemnestra, revealing the deal and urging her to cancel Iphigenia's journey. However, Menelaus' men intercept the servant on the road and bring him back to Aulis. In the ensuing confrontation, Menelaus condemns his brother for sacrificing Greece's honor for personal interests. Agamemnon challenges this argument convincingly, persuading Menelaus that no war is worth the life of a child. Following their agreement, Agamemnon decides to deliver the letter to Clytemnestra personally, but it's too late. A messenger announces the imminent arrival of the wedding party, including Clytemnestra. Agamemnon is stunned by the news and resigns himself to fate: "From now on, fate rules. Not I."

Upon Clytemnestra's arrival at Aulis, she is filled with happiness about her daughter's impending marriage to the renowned Myrmidon leader, Achilles. However, Iphigenia's first encounter with her father is fraught with double entendre, which is devastating: as she speaks of her upcoming wedding, he speaks of her impending sacrifice. Although they use the same words, their meanings could not be more tragically divergent. When Agamemnon meets with Clytemnestra, he futilely attempts to persuade her to return to Argos without witnessing the "wedding". Clytemnestra and Achilles soon discover the truth from Agamemnon's aged servant. Achilles is overwhelmed with shame and anger upon learning of the deception that has ensnared him in this tragedy. Clytemnestra erupts into fury and, in desperation, confronts her husband one last time. However, Agamemnon is ensnared in his own trap and cannot retreat, as Odysseus has threatened to disclose the true nature of the sacrifice to the army if Agamemnon fails to comply with the oracle's demand.

Meanwhile, preparations for the sacrifice progress swiftly. "Let's not delay; the wind is picking up," declares Calchas. Odysseus finally takes action by revealing the chosen sacrificial victim to the army. With this revelation, there is no turning back. Although Iphigenia briefly manages to escape, she is soon captured by Odysseus' soldiers. In a poignant scene reminiscent of the dying sacred stag at the film's outset, Iphigenia is found lying exhausted and breathless on the forest floor, evoking a sense of impending tragedy. Her captors return her to the camp to face her fate. Resigned to her destiny, she shares a heartrending final meeting with her father before ascending the hill towards her fate. Meanwhile, Agamemnon, surrounded by his jubilant army, watches helplessly from below as Iphigenia reaches the summit and is swiftly seized by Calchas. At that moment, as the wind rises, Agamemnon rushes up the steps. Upon reaching the hilltop, his expression reflects the assumed sight of his daughter's demise. With a strong wind now blowing, the men hasten to the beach, launching their ships into the sea and setting sail towards Troy and its promised riches.

== Cast ==
- Irene Papas as Clytemnestra
- Tatiana Papamoschou as Iphigenia
- Kostas Kazakos as Agamemnon
- Costas Carras as Menelaus
- Christos Tsagas as Odysseus
- Panos Mihalopoulos as Achilles
- Dimitri Aronis as Calchas

== Divergences from the original play ==
Cacoyannis made a number of changes to Iphigenia in Aulis in order to adapt it to modern cinema, some of them significant divergences from the original plot. Cacoyannis does away with the traditional Greek tragic chorus originally employed to explain key scenes, replacing it in some cases with a chorus of Greek soldiers. He introduces as dramatis personae Odysseus and Calchas, who were not present but were mentioned in the original play, to further the plot and voice certain themes.

As in Euripides' original work, Cacoyannis deliberately renders the ending ambiguous. Though Greek myth states that Iphigenia was miraculously saved by the deities at the moment of her death, this event is not directly depicted in either the play or the film, leaving Iphigenia's true fate in question although Agamemnon's expression leaves little doubt that her death, in fact, has just taken place. In Euripides' Iphigenia in Aulis, Iphigenia's rescue is described second-hand by a messenger. In the film, there is no overt reference to this event: the audience sees clouds and mist, followed by a shot of Agamemnon's shocked expression.

== Home video ==
Iphigenia was released on DVD by MGM Home Entertainment on July 24, 2007, as a Region 1 DVD. It was released on Blu-ray by Olive Films on May 24, 2016. A limited edition high definition Blu-ray for regions A and B was later released by Radiance Films on February 23, 2026.

== See also ==
- Iphigenia
- Iphigenia in Aulis
- Iphigenia in Tauris
- List of historical drama films
- Greek mythology in popular culture
- List of submissions to the 50th Academy Awards for Best Foreign Language Film
- List of Greek submissions for the Academy Award for Best International Feature Film
