= K-T.V. =

European children's network

Ownership
- Owner: Multichoice
- Sister channels: K-TV World

History
- Launched: 1990 (South Africa); 1993 (Scandinavia, Netherlands)
- Closed: 1997 (Scandinavia, Netherlands); 2001 (Greece); 2002 (Cyprus); 2011 (South Africa)

Links
- Website: www.ktv.co.za (archived on 6 May 2000)

K-T.V. (also known as Kids TV) was a children's network broadcast in Scandinavia, the Netherlands, Belgium, Greece, Cyprus and South Africa as a programming block on M-Net and later on FilmNet. It was owned by Multichoice. In Greece, it used to air in the morning and afternoon on Alfa TV exclusively for NOVA.

Its sister programming block was K-TV World (also known as K-World), which aired mostly in the afternoon, while K-T.V. aired in the morning.

== History ==
Scandinavia and the Netherlands: It was a programming block on Filmnet (temporary called FilmNet Plus and renamed later as FilmNet 1 in Sweden), from 1 January 1993, to 11 January 1997. It was broadcasting in the mornings and the noon/afternoon. It had a sister programming block called "K-TV mini".

Greece: The network was replaced on 1 October 2001, by Fox Kids. However, the site and the club were still active.

Cyprus: It was a programming block on Alfa TV, until January 2002, when it was replaced by a Nickelodeon one. The block is not to be confused with Kids TV, the K-T.V. block's spiritual successor, independently managed by the channel itself.

Africa: it started broadcasting on the M-Net channel in 1990. It signed a strategic alliance with Nickelodeon in 1999, providing it with programming. The block ended on 1 April 2011, as the audience had migrated entirely to DStv's roster of kids channels.

=== Playback ===
Playback was a weekly K-T.V. original TV show, presented by Jenna Dover. There, you could vote for your favorite video each week and win prizes.

=== Ti Paizei ===
Ti Paizei (Greek: Τι Παίζει) was an original production for the Greek counterpart of the network, presented by Vanta Rapti, George Menediatis and Mary Vlachou.

=== Music Mail ===
Music Mail (Greek: Μουσικό Μήνυμα) was an original production for the Greek counterpart of the network, similar to Playback. It featured video clips, tributes, news and exclusive interviews from singers; it was presented by Vanta Rapti.

== See also ==
- M-Net
- Filmnet
- SuperSport (South African TV channel)
