= Tatiana Papamoschou =

Greek actress

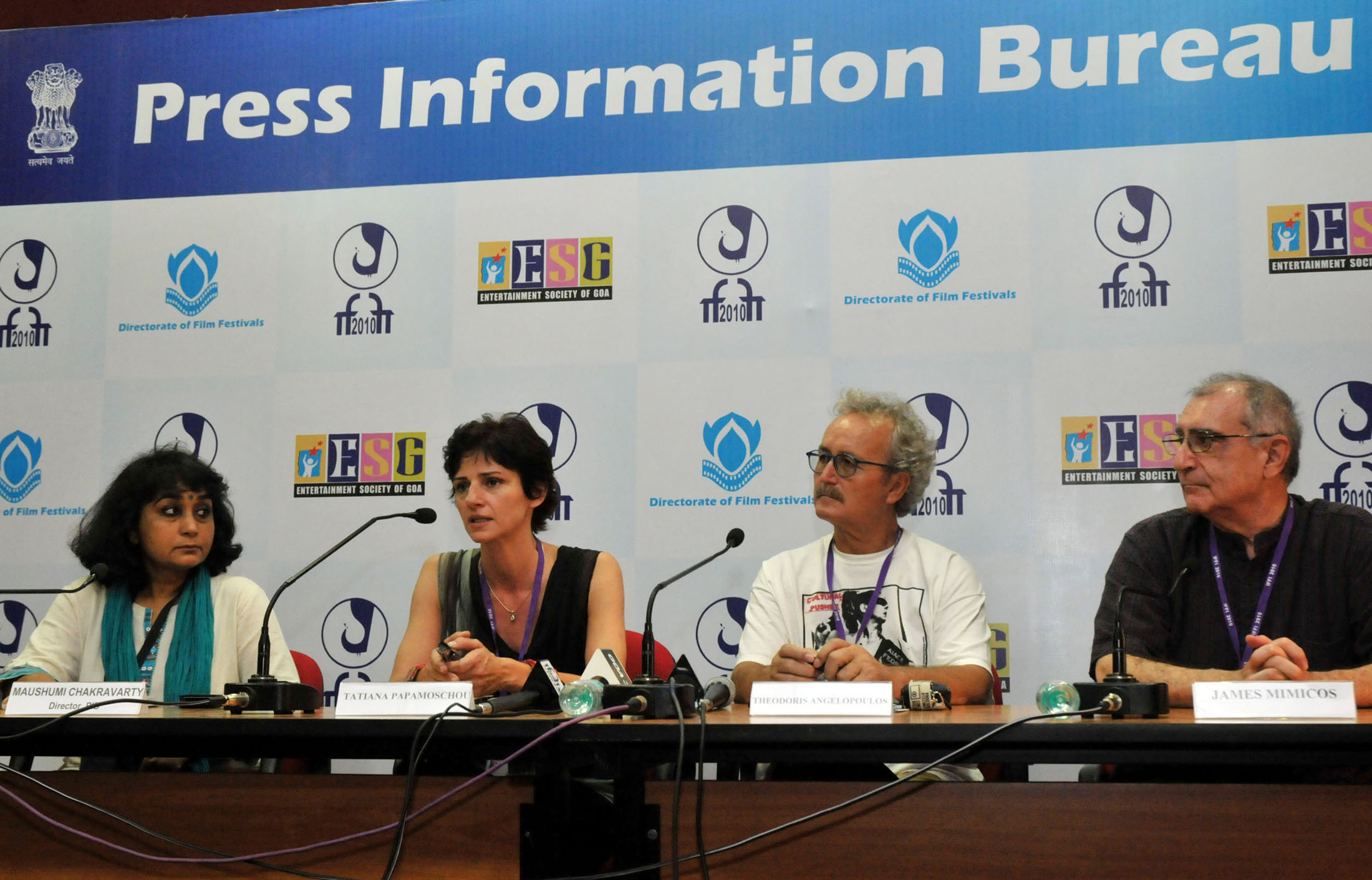
- Tatiana Papamoschou, IFFI (2010)
- Occupations: Writer; director

Tatiana Papamoschou (Greek: Τατιάνα Παπαμόσχου; born 1964 in Athens, Greece) is a Greek actress who has starred in numerous Greek theatrical, film and television productions. She is best known for her role as the title character in the 1977 Oscar-nominated film Iphigenia (her first film role), for which she earned the Best Leading Actress Award at the 1977 Thessaloniki Film Festival.

She was only 13 years old when she was cast as Iphigenia. In addition to Greek, she speaks fluent English and French. She was also in two other movies and a short film called Happy New Year, Mom! It was only 22 minutes long.
