= 902 TV =

Greek television network

902
- Country: Greece
- Availability: National, via Satellite
- Owner: Communist Party of Greece
- Launch date: 1990
- Dissolved: 2013
- Picture format: 4:3 (576i, SDTV)

902 TV was a television station in Greece that was owned by the Communist Party of Greece.

It featured general entertainment programming and was available throughout Greece. On September 10, 2012, ceased operations due to financial difficulties as well as the high costs involved in converting from analogue to digital. On March 2, 2013, starts broadcasting again via Digea.

On 11 August 2013, the television station along with the relevant broadcast license was sold by the party to a private company called A-Horizon Media Ltd, and hence no longer has any affiliation to the party. The station was renamed to Epsilon TV (E TV now Open TV) and broadcasts completely different shows than 902 TV.
