= Epic (telecommunications) =

Cyprus based telecommunications company

Epic Ltd
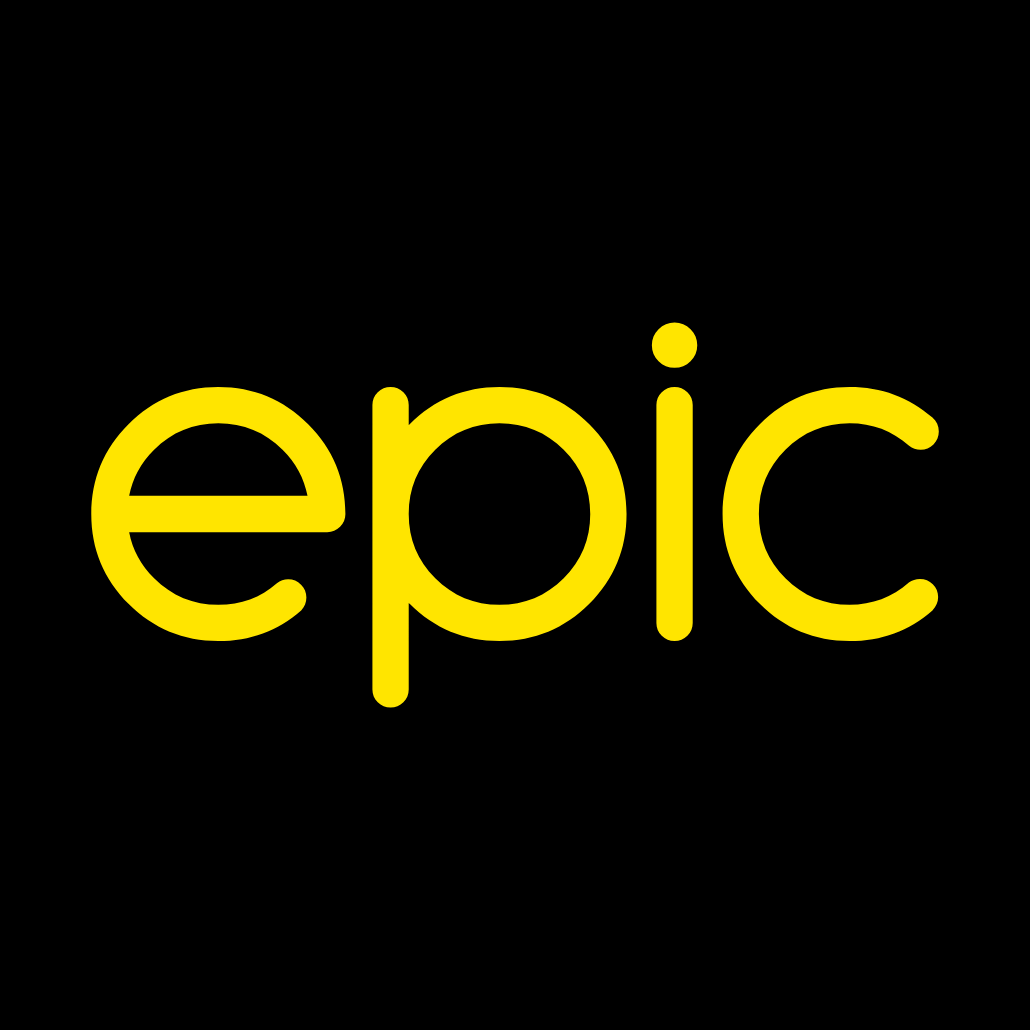
- Formerly: Areeba (2004–2007); MTN (2007–2019)
- Company type: Subsidiary
- Industry: Telecommunications
- Founded: 2004; 22 years ago
- Founder: Investcom
- Headquarters: Nicosia, Cyprus
- Number of locations: 18 (2021)
- Area served: Cyprus
- Products: Mobile telephony; Fixed telephony
- Owner: Monaco Telecom (100%)
- Number of employees: 300 (2021)
- Parent: Monaco Telecom
- Website: www.epic.com.cy

Epic Ltd (from 2004 to 2007 Areeba Ltd, and then from 2007 to 2019 MTN Cyprus Ltd), is a Cyprus based telecommunications service provider owned by Monaco Telecom.

It is the second largest mobile network operator in Cyprus by number of subscribers, behind Cyta.

In addition to its already established mobile network, the company is a provider of fixed telephony, broadband services and TV.

== History ==
=== Areeba (2004–2007) ===
The company commenced its operations in Cyprus in July 2004 as Areeba after being granted the second mobile telephony licence by the Cyprus Government. In December 2004, Areeba introduced the first 3G network in Cyprus.

=== MTN (2007–2019) ===
In September 2007 Areeba was rebranded to MTN after its parent company (Investcom) was acquired by the multinational telecommunications company MTN Group. In March 2008, MTN upgraded its 3G network to support HSPA (marketed as 3.5G).

In October 2008, the MTN Group and Amaracos Holdings entered into a partnership with Amaracos acquiring 49% of MTN Cyprus' stock. In turn, MTN Cyprus acquired 100% of Infotel Ltd (Germanos chain of stores) as well as Otenet (Cyprus) Ltd, a fixed telephony and internet provider, thus entering both the fixed telephony and internet service markets respectively for the first time. In February 2013, the MTN Group reached an agreement with Amaracos Holdings to acquire the latter's share capital in MTN Cyprus, resulting in the MTN Group now possessing 100% of the shares in MTN Cyprus.

In March 2015, MTN launched its 4G/LTE network, being the first alongside PrimeTel to introduce the first 4G networks in Cyprus. In May 2017, MTN expanded its services to include subscription based TV by launching MTN TV.

In September 2018, it was announced that Monaco Telecom (operating in the principality of Monaco and a member of NJJ Holding) had acquired the entire share capital of MTN Cyprus from the MTN Group for €260 million. As a part of the deal Monaco Telecom was allowed to continue using the MTN brand name for three years in exchange for a commercial fee.

In November 2018, MTN upgraded its 4G network to support LTE-A (marketed as 4.5G). In May 2019, MTN announced the deployment of wideband audio for voice calls between its subscribers (also known and marketed as HD voice).

=== Epic (since 2019) ===
In June 2019, Monaco Telecom retired the MTN brand name and renamed the company as Epic.

In December 2020 Epic deployed VoLTE on its 4G network, becoming the first mobile network in Cyprus to do so. In the same month Epic participated in the Cyprus Government's 5G licence auction, winning a licence enabling it to build and operate a 5G network.

On 9 July 2021 Epic officially launched its 5G network.

== Marketshare ==
According to statistics released by the Office of Electronic Communications & Postal Regulations (OCECPR), as of March 2021, Epic is the second largest mobile network operator in Cyprus, after CYTA (which has a market share of 54.50%), controlling 33.80% of the market.

== Awards ==
Epic has won the following awards:

Awards Won by Epic (Cyprus)
| Award | Date/Period | Awarded by |
|---|---|---|
| Best Mobile Network in Test | June 2020, March 2021 | umlaut |
| Fastest Mobile Network | January–June 2020, July–December 2020 | Ookla |
| Fastest Fixed Internet | April–September 2023 | Ookla |

== Mobile Network Frequencies ==
Frequencies Used on the Epic (Cyprus) Network
| Frequency (MHz) | Protocol | Class |
|---|---|---|
| 900 | GSM-900 | 2G |
| 1800 | GPRS/EDGE | 2G |
| 900 | UMTS/HSPA+ | 3G |
| 2100 | UMTS/HSPA+ | 3G |
| 800 | LTE/LTE-A | 4G/4G+ |
| 1800 | LTE/LTE-A | 4G/4G+ |
| 2600 | LTE/LTE-A | 4G/4G+ |
| 700 | 5G NR | 5G |
| 3600 | 5G NR | 5G |

== See also ==
- List of mobile network operators in Europe
