= Lumiere TV =

Cyprus television service

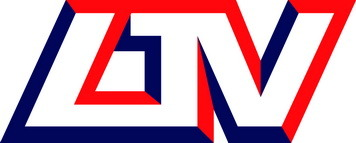
- Country: Cyprus

Ownership
- Owner: Lumiere TV Limited

History
- Launched: 20 September 1993
- Closed: August 2014

Lumiere TV (LTV) was a pay television service based in Cyprus and broadcast in more than 67 European and African countries. It broadcast movies, series, documentaries and social TV shows. It was owned by LTV Group Ltd.

== Availability ==
Repeaters had been set up across 67 countries that enabled more than 80% of the population to receive these services. Lumiere TV was originally available on the Nova platform but following a financial dispute, it moved over to rival Athina Sat in July 2006. As of March 3, 2008, LTV was once again available through Nova, following a new agreement that was signed between the two companies.

The channel is no longer available through Athina Sat, which ceased operations in March 2008. It was also available through IPTV providers CytaVision and PrimeTel until its final closure and liquidation in August 2014.

== Channels and content ==
Lumiere TV operated eight multiplex channels:

Channels	Description
	LTV was a 24-hour channel which broadcast entertainment, news and sports programming, as well as live football matches of the Cypriot Champions League. It also broadcast blockbuster movies, feature films, top-rated television series, lifestyle programmes, reality shows and talk-shows. The sports section included live football matches and sports programmes.
	LTV1 was a 24-hour channel and it focused on the live transmission of sports events and sports-related programmes. The entertainment content involved Nickelodeon's children's programmes and a vast range of animation movies which were broadcast daily.
	LTV2 was a 24-hour channel and included prime TV series and mini-series from the biggest American studios. Movies and programs of general interest were also included.
	LTV3 was a 24-hour channel which broadcast premieres of blockbuster films and TV-movies, but also old favourite movies. The channel also included a daily adult zone.
	LTV Sports 1 was a 24-hour channel which broadcast live transmissions, highlights and sports shows for big football events, such as the Marfin Laiki Championship, the Coca-Cola Cup, the Barclays Premier League, the German Bundesliga and the Spanish Primera Division. Also, it broadcast basketball and tennis games, golf, motor sports events and as well as the NBA.
	LTV Sports 2 aimed to complement the LTV Sports 1 channel in cases of simultaneous or multiple event transmissions, such as the Barclays Premier League, the Spanish Primera Division, the Greek Superleague, and others. It also broadcast live tennis events and weekly football highlights.
	LTV Sports HD broadcast football games and many sports in HD.
	Premier League's High Definition channel with 380 LIVE exciting football matches and 400 derbies of the past that remained in history. Highlights, commentaries, season review, live transmissions, sports shows, and the latest updates.

== Programming ==
Lumiere TV featured hit movies from Greece and abroad, including Hollywood blockbusters. It also aired hit TV series from the US and it broadcast over 15 premieres each month with new release films being added continuously.
