= Cyta =

Semi-governmental Telecom in Cyprus

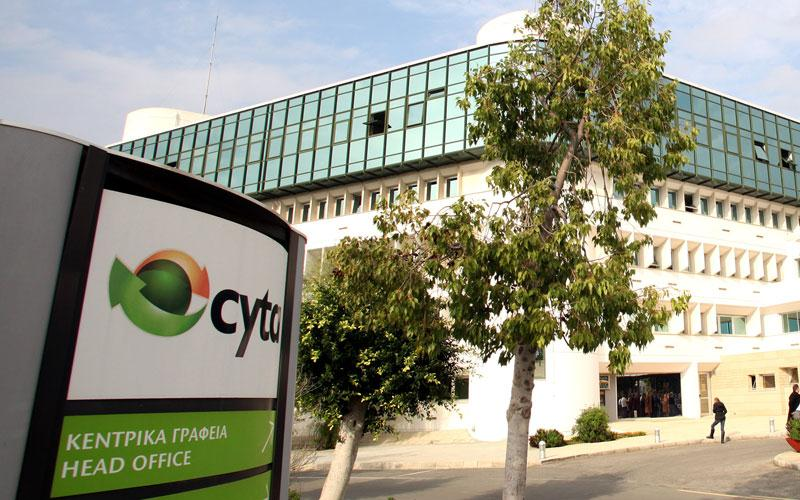
- CYTA Central Offices
- Native name: Cyprus Telecommunications Authority (CYTA)
- Formerly: Cyprus Inland Telecommunications Authority (CITA; 1955-1961)
- Type: State-owned
- Industry: Telecommunications
- Founded: 1955; 71 years ago
- Headquarters: Strovolos, Nicosia, Cyprus
- Area served: Cyprus
- Key people: Michael Ioannides (Chairman); Andreas Neocleous (CEO)
- Products: Fixed-line telephony Mobile telephony IPTV; Broadband
- Revenue: ▲€400.1 million (2022)
- Operating income: ▲€84.79 million (2022)
- Net income: ▼€76.08 million (2022)
- Total assets: ▲€1.081 billion (2022)
- Total equity: ▲€1.116 billion (2022)
- Owner: Government of Cyprus
- Number of employees: 2,287 (2022)
- Website: www.cyta.com.cy

Cyta (Greek: [ˈsita]) is a semi-governmental company incorporated by law. It is the dominant provider of fixed-line telecommunications, mobile telecommunications and Internet access in Cyprus.

== History ==
Originally established as Cyprus Inland Telecommunications Authority (CITA; Greek: Αρχή Εσωτερικών Τηλεπικοινωνιών Κύπρου (A.E.T.K.)) in 1955, took on its current name Cyprus Telecommunications Authority (CYTA; Greek: Αρχή Τηλεπικοινωνιών Κύπρου (Α.ΤΗ.Κ.) [aˈtik]) in 1961 after taking control of external communications from Cable & Wireless Ltd.

It has provided Internet access since 1995 under the brand Cytanet, and it now offers broadband services DSL access. Branded as miVision then, Cyta entered in 2004 the digital and interactive television market. The service has been renamed Cytavision.

In 1988, the company launched mobile telephony offer under the brand Cytagsm, which became Cytamobile in 2004, and the same year, following a network partnership agreement with Vodafone, it was renamed Cytamobile-Vodafone.

== Operations ==
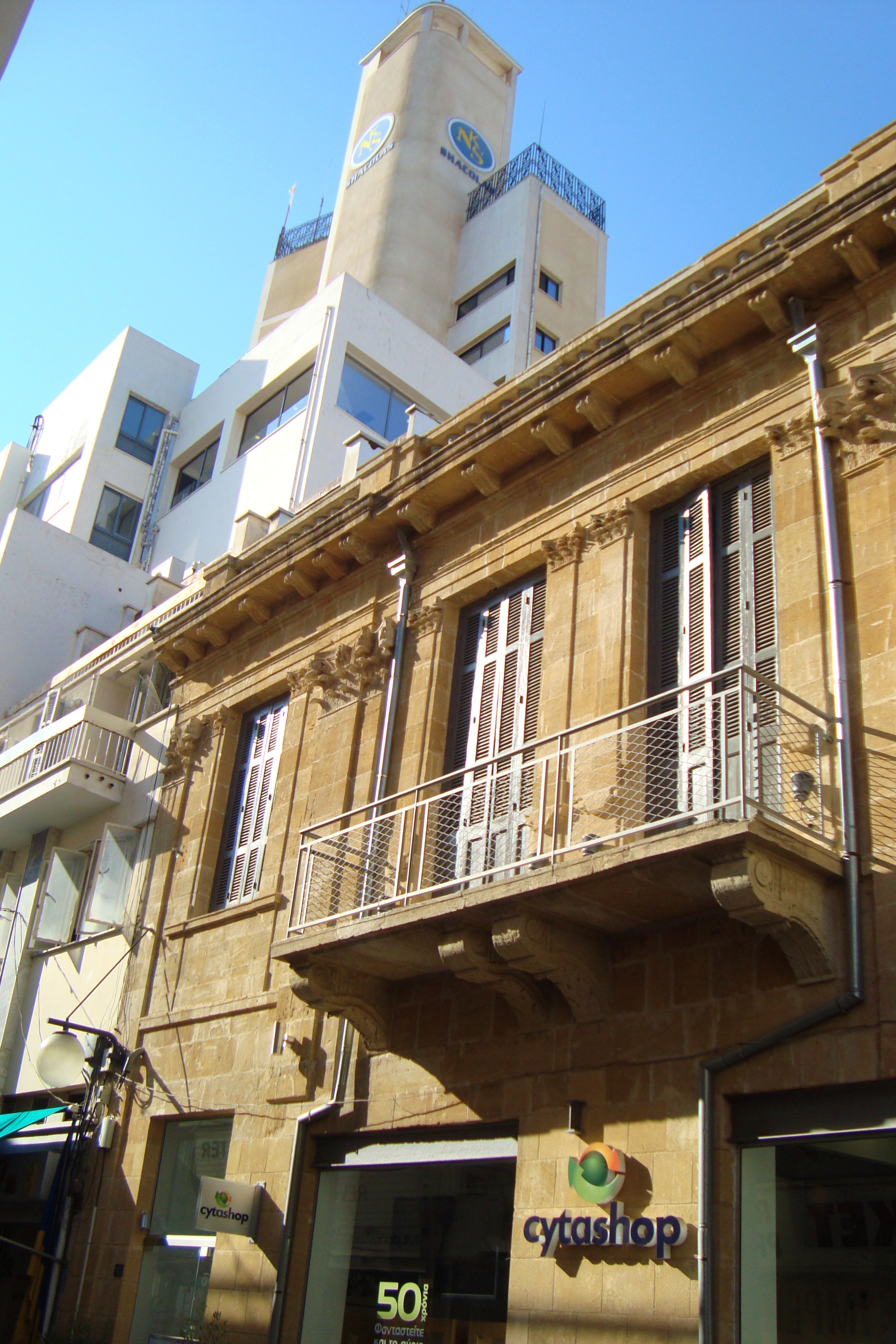
Cytashop in Nicosia, Cyprus

Nowadays, Cyta provides a broad range of services and facilities for voice and data applications in both fixed and mobile telephony.

Building on its role as a telecommunications hub in the South-Eastern Mediterranean, Cyta expanded its operations in the Greek market, offering broadband Internet and fixed telephony services in specific areas of Greece, with plans for further expansion in the future. It also operates in the British market, under the brand Cyta UK, offering "tailored network solutions" to customers based on the IP-MPLS platform. Central and Eastern Europe are markets that have also been targeted.

In recent years and following Cyprus’ accession to the European Union in 2004, Cyta faced a number of challenges with regard to the legal implications and regulations of operating within the European Bloc, the fierce competition this brings as well as the ever-changing developments in telecommunications.

== Services ==
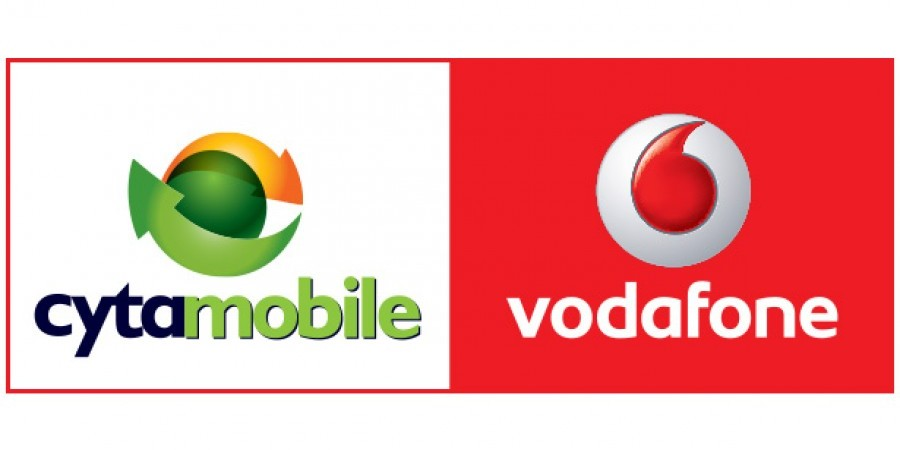
Cytamobile-Vodafone old logo (2008–2017)

The company covers the whole country with digital PSTN, ISDN, DSL and FTTH services. Cyta is offering fixed-line telephony, Internet service provider (Cytanet), mobile telephony (Cytamobile) and pay television (Cytavision).

== See also ==
- List of mobile network operators in Europe
