= PrimeTel =

Telecommunications company in Cyprus

Primetel
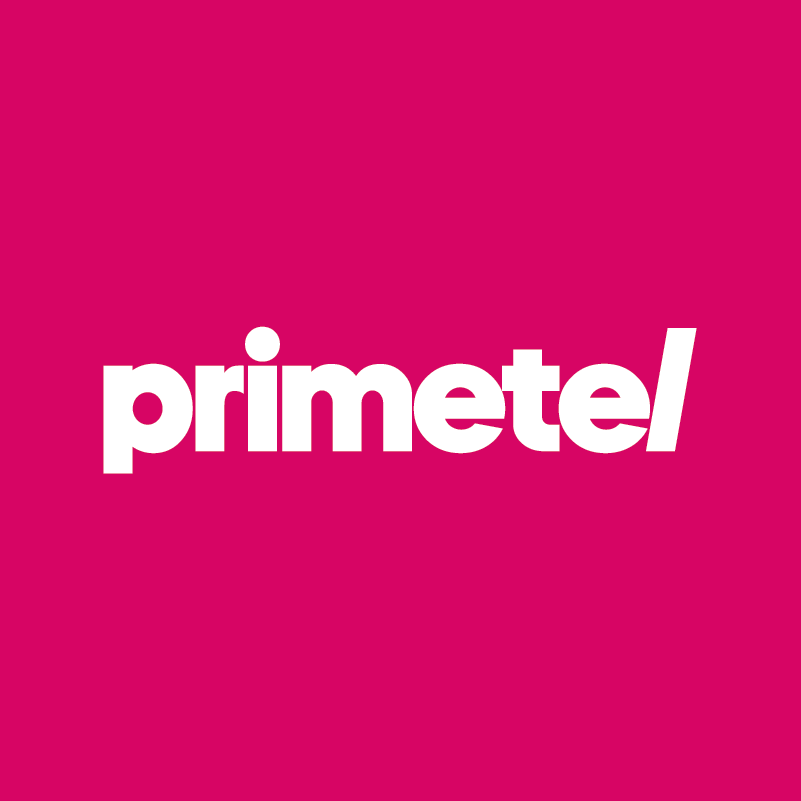
- Type: Private
- Industry: Telecommunication
- Founded: 2003
- Headquarters: Limassol
- Area served: Cyprus
- Products: Telephone; IPTV; Broadband; Mobile
- Parent: Primetel PLC
- Website: primetel.com.cy

Former logo (2003-2020)

Primetel PLC is a Cypriot telecommunications company that offers and develops voice, data, and video services. It is ranked third in fixed-line telephony after Cyta and Epic, with a market share of 11.2%(2025). The company owns and operates a regional network in Cyprus, Germany, Greece, Russia, and the United Kingdom, providing data communications, fiber-optic fixed network infrastructure, and IP-based services between Europe and the Middle East.

== History ==
In June 2009, Primetel announced the launch of its submarine fiber cable landing station in Geroskipou and that Reliance Globalcom had terminated its 2.7 terabit HAWK submarine cable system into it.

In May 2011, Primetel launched the first mobile virtual network operator in Cyprus, making it the third cellphone operator on the island. Primetel has recently launched Mobile telephony services with Quad–Play services (Fixed and mobile telephony, Internet and TV).

In April 2015, Primetel launched the third mobile network operator in Cyprus. Based on data released by the Office of the Commissioner for Electronic Communications and Postal Services Regulation (OCECPR) for the first half of 2025, Primetel holds an 11.2% market share in total mobile connections in Cyprus.

In July 2023, Primetel was placed into administration after defaulting on a loan it has acquired from Signal Capital Partners.

== See also ==
- List of mobile network operators in Europe
