= Plus TV (Cyprus) =

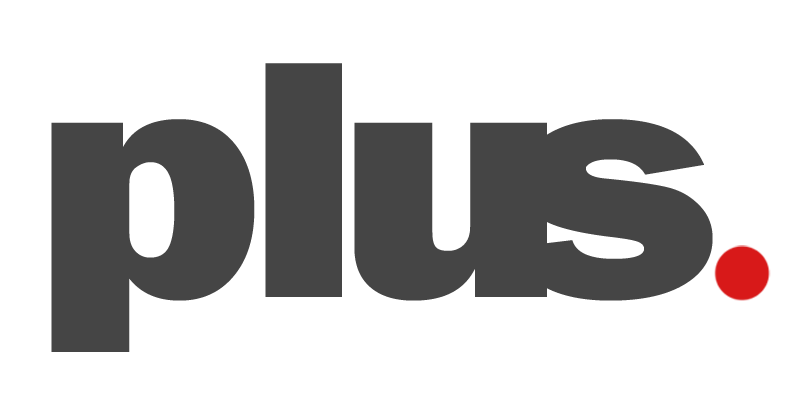
- Country: Cyprus
- Broadcast area: National
- Headquarters: Engomi, Nicosia, Cyprus

Programming
- Language(s): Greek
- Picture format: 16:9 (576i, SDTV)

Ownership
- Owner: Proteas Production and Media Limited
- Sister channels: New Epsilon TV

History
- Launched: 28 July 2016
- Former names: Astra TV (2000-2005); Axia Channel (2005-2006)

Former logo

Plus TV is a private national free-to-air television channel. It is the sixth private TV channel established in Cyprus. Its first official broadcast took place on July 28, 2006.

== History ==
Its first official broadcast was in the mid-2000s as Astra TV until 2005 when it was renamed to Axia Channel. Later, on July 28, 2006 it changed to CNC Plus TV, with CNC meaning Cyprus New Channel. It broadcast a pilot program with children's and music shows. After January 2007, it changed to its current name (Plus TV) with the acronym CNC later removed after August 2007.

In July 2006, it maintained a partnership with Alter Channel while also including more Cypriot productions and partnership with Greek Alpha TV and 902 TV. In September 2007 the channel changed ownership and made ‘rapid improvements’.

At the end of the 2009-2010 season Plus TV occupied the lowest audience share among the nationwide channels, with direct implications for advertising value.

In 2009, it stopped cooperation with these three channels and started a new deal with Star Channel, broadcasting most of its programs until 2015 when Omegastarted an exclusive cooperation with the television channel.

In 2016, Plus was acquired by Filippos Vryonis, who three years before bought 902 TV, turning it into Epsilon, while also owning two regional channels in Greece (Extra and AB) with the aim of renaming the all-Cypriot channel to Epsilon Cyprus. However, the plan was aborted due to continued obstacles from the Cyprus Radio and Television Authority and a lack of data. Previously, in 2013 when the then pan-Hellenic Epsilon started broadcasting, he had signed a collaboration with the also all-Cypriot Capital TV based in Limassol.

In September 2018, there was a dispute between Plus and Omega (then known TV one) over the cooperation and broadcasting of programs of the renamed Epsilon/Open channel due to a change of ownership the year before. Due to these changes, the channel started cooperating with New Epsilon, having a shorter range in Greece, replacing Extra, which returned to AB's frequencies.
