= Closure of ERT =

Closure of Greek public broadcaster

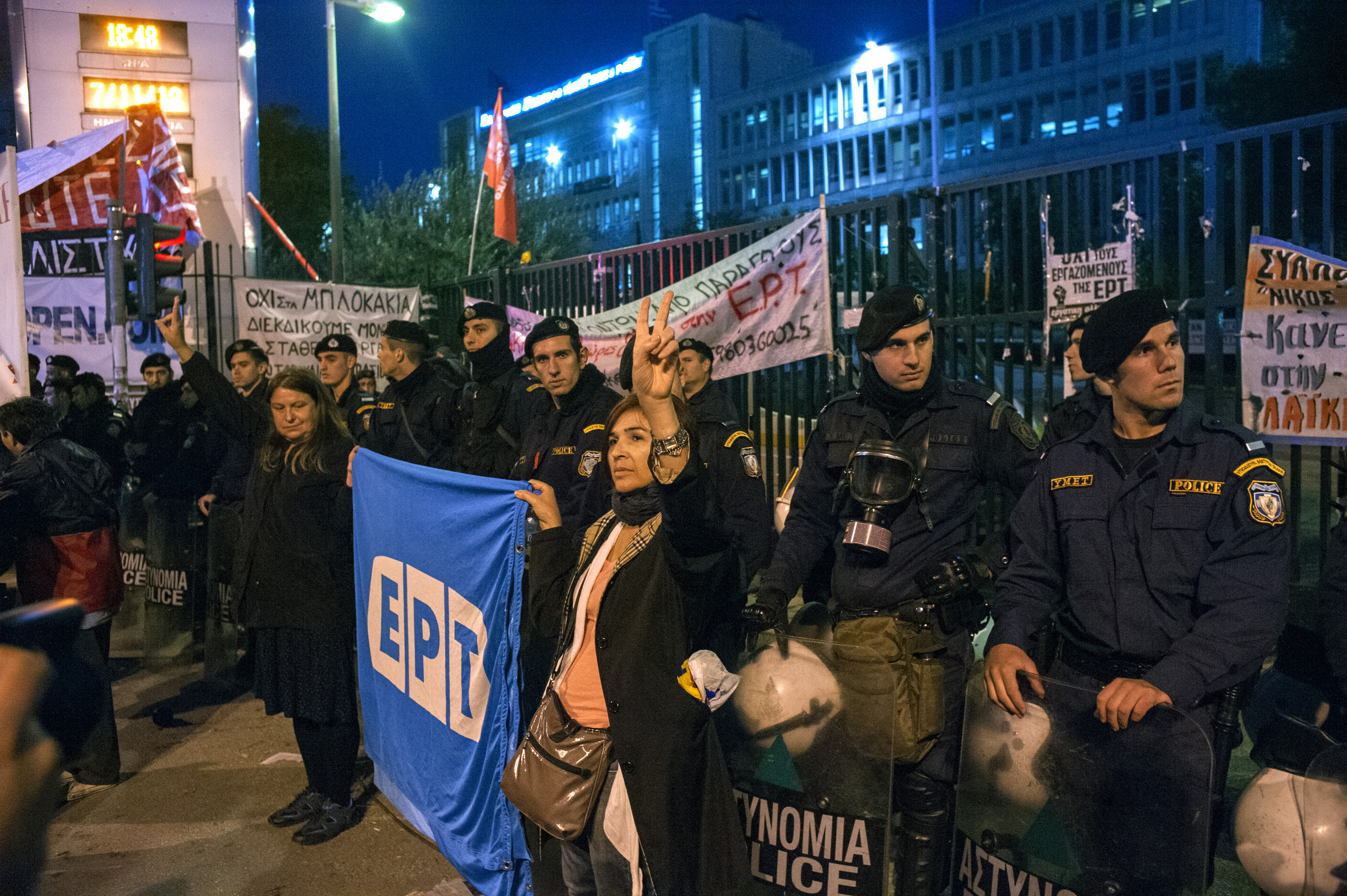
- Date: 11 June – 7 November 2013
- Location: Greece
- Causes: Firing of 2,656 employees
- Methods: Occupation of the Radiomegaron; Protests; Establishment of ERT Open
- Outcome: Evacuation of the Radiomegaron; Establishment of new operator

From 11 June until 7 November 2013, the ND/PASOK/DIMAR coalition government, shut down the Hellenic Broadcasting Corporation (ERT), the then public broadcaster of Greece, in order to replace it with the New Hellenic Radio, Internet and Television (NERIT). The sudden decision, announced only hours before the formal closure of the broadcaster, cited high operating costs and alleged a lack of transparency in the organization.

The decision was highly controversial, leading to national and international outrage, as well as causing the Democratic Left party to leave the government. Most fired employees continued to broadcast from the headquarters of ERT, while after their expulsion from the Radiomegaron, a minority continued broadcasting through ΕRT Open while others took part in the new public broadcaster, NERIT.

== Timeline ==
On 11 June 2013, Minister for the Press and Mass Media and Government Spokesperson Simos Kedikoglou announced that by midnight of the same day, ERT would shut down and that its 2,656 employees would be laid-off. According to his statements, after a short but undefined period of time, a new public broadcaster with a staff of less than 1,000 people would begin operating.

ERT was dissolved by a joint ministerial decision issued under Article 14B of the Law 3429/2005 (on the dissolution, merger and restructuring of public enterprises) as amended by an Act of Legislative Content (Government Gazette 139/11.6.2013, Issue A'). Despite the existence of a budget surplus thanks to the contribution fee, Kedikoglou described ERT as a "waste shelter" that cost more and had fewer viewers than private media.

Shortly before dawn on 12 June the transmission of the signal from the broadcasting antennas throughout Greece was interrupted by the intervention of the MAT on some transmitters. The analogue signal was interrupted at 22:54, the digital signal at 23:12 and the radio signal at 23:22. At the same time, the signal of other TV channels using the same transponders was cut off. Using satellite services, some offices and other places that had not yet been closed, ERT journalists continued their broadcasts online.

In turn the state, which had already directly assumed the management of ERT, requested the suspension of the retransmission of ERT's television programming by television stations and internet providers on the grounds that it was not legal and licensed.

On 12 June the official websites ert.gr, ert3.gr and voiceofgreece.gr were removed from the Greek online register. Other assets and websites registered by ERT were in danger of being shut down (because the managers decided to cancel and change the contact address), in particular the official Facebook and Twitter pages. ERT Live began broadcasting on other websites and blogs.

== Reactions ==
The closure of ERT triggered a wave of protests and reactions throughout Greece, with citizens gathering outside the ERT Radiomegaron in a show of support and solidarity throughout the evening, while the ESIEA, the GSEE and ADEDY went on a 24-hour strike. A wave of reactions was also caused abroad with the beginning of the television coverage of the events at the Mesogeion Avenue Radiomegaron by foreign television networks. The EBU was quick to criticise the closure of ERT, issuing a statement expressing "deep disappointment on behalf of the entire public media in Europe" and calling on Prime Minister Antonis Samaras to reverse the decision.

On 12 June the Belgian channel "Télé Bruxelles" (now "BX1") broadcast the ERT logo with the word "Solidarité" meaning "solidarity" underneath.

Despite the announcement of the closure, the majority of ERT employees remained at their workplaces. After the closure of the transmitters and the website, broadcasting continued via satellite with EBU equipment. The EBU also allocated a frequency for the live streaming of ERT's broadcast on the internet. In addition, ERT employees reopened the analogue transmitters in most areas of Greece to continue broadcasting its programme.

On 21 June 2013 the Democratic Left, the then third government partner, withdrew from the ND-PASOK coalition, citing as a reason the way the government chose to reorganise public broadcasting.

=== Council of state decision and creation of Dimosia Tileorasi ===
On 12 June 2013 the government announced the entity that would replace ERT, New Hellenic Radio, Internet and Television (NERIT). Five days later, the Council of State ruled that the closure of ERT was legal but at the same time demanded the continued operation of a public broadcaster for the period until the establishment and operation of a new broadcaster. In order not to reopen ERT, the government created a temporary body, Dimosia Tileorasi, which was under the Ministry of Finance, which had undertaken the management of ERT's assets and liquidation. The broadcaster began its experimental operation on 10 July.

=== POSPERT appeal to the European Court of Justice ===
In April 2018 the European Court of Human Rights accepted and examined the application of POSPERT, which, among other things, argued that "the total closure of a public service broadcaster amounts to a violation of freedom of expression, protected by Article 10 of the ECHR".

== Continued broadcasting and evacuation of the Radiomegaron ==
Most of the workers refused to leave the ERT building and continued broadcasting their radio, and television broadcasts as well as through the internet. On 24 October 2013 the EBU stopped transmitting ERT's programme via its satellites, which affected terrestrial broadcasting in some parts of Greece. At dawn on Thursday 7 November 2013, riot police and in the presence of a prosecutor entered the Agia Paraskevi Radiomegaron, evacuated it and arrested four employees. In this way, they put an end to five months of radio and television broadcasting from the Radiomegaron. This was followed by clashes and limited use of tear gas outside the building where people gathered after a call by the workers.

A minority of ERT employees continued to broadcast programmes through the ERT Open project, which continued television broadcasts from ET3's frequencies and radio broadcasts from various regions of Greece.

== Re-opening of ERT ==
The SYRIZA and the ANEL, the two parties that formed the coalition government that emerged from the elections of January 2015 had in their programme the reopening of ERT. On 28 April 2015, the relevant bill was passed by a majority vote which provided for the reopening of all ERT's television and radio stations and the Radiotelevision magazine, with a maximum planned staff of 2,500 employees.

ERT came back together with the channels: ERT1, ERT2 and ERT HD and the radio stations: Proto, Second and Third Programme, Kosmos 93.6, ERA Sport, Voice of Greece, ERT3's radio station Macedonia (102 FM, 95.8 FM) and its 19 regional radio stations on 11 June 2015 with a renewed programme, 95.8 FM).

ERT's third channel, ERT3, which did not stop broadcasting from the day of the operator's closure, reappeared on ERT's nationwide frequencies with a new programme on 29 June 2015. On 12 October 2017, the Radiotelevision magazine was re-released. The radio programmes Filia 106.7, Trito Programma Vrahea and the foreign language programmes of the Voice of Greece did not resume. On 5 March 2018, the ERT building at the corner of Muroouzi and Rigillis streets was reopened. On July 2021, the ERTOpen channel became Zeppelin, a rock music station.

== See also ==
- Czech TV crisis
- 2023 Polish public media crisis
