= Countries using DAB/DMB =

Countries with regular services Countries with trials and/or regulation Countries with interest DAB no longer used/switched to another standard

The radio technology Digital Audio Broadcasting (DAB and DAB+), and its television sibling, digital multimedia broadcasting (DMB), is operated in several regions worldwide, either in the form of full services, or as feasibility studies.

As of 2017, 420 million people are able to receive DAB services, with over 2,100 DAB services on air in 38 countries.

This article provides brief information on most of the regions using DAB, DAB+ and DMB.

The majority of these services are using DAB+, with only Ireland, the UK, Romania and Brunei still using a significant number of DAB services.

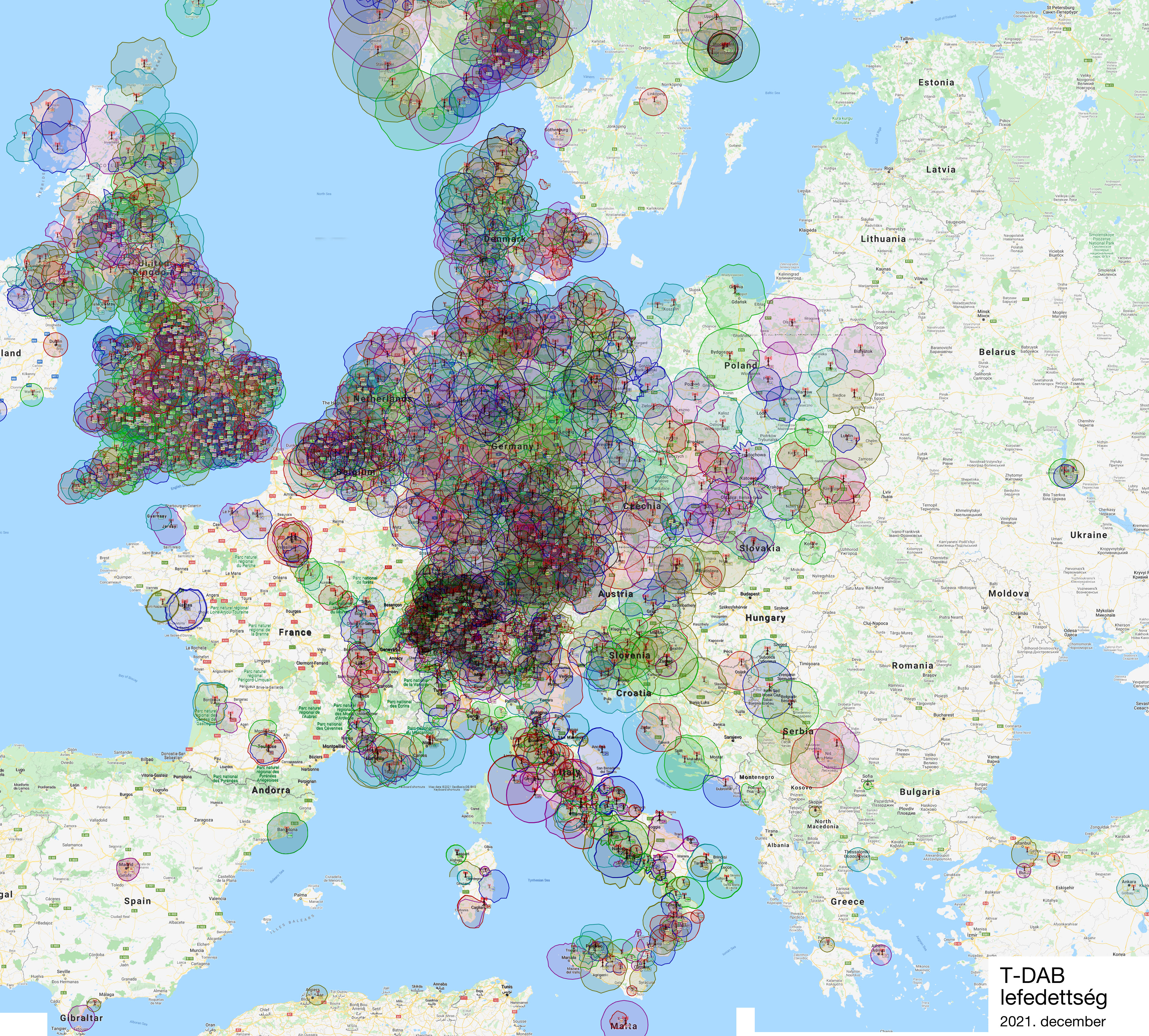
T-DAB transmitters and coverage areas in Europe, in December 2021

== Australia ==
Australia was one of the first countries to commence large scale rollout of the newer DAB+ standard on 4 May 2009. As of 2017, nearly 25% of the population of the five metropolitan capitals (Sydney, Melbourne, Brisbane, Perth and Adelaide) were listening to DAB+ radio each week. Over 3 million digital radios have been sold with listeners being able to receive over 380 DAB+ stations.

== Austria ==
Digital Radio Austria (Verein Digitalradio Österreich) will apply for a DAB+ trial license. Two transmitters will operate as a single frequency network, with one transmitting a 10 kW signal. This test mode is scheduled to last a year, with the possibility of an extension in to 2015. The twelve radio stations which will take part in the trial are being selected. Unlike earlier trials, consumers will receive more information on this new way of radio consumption and there will be a large volume of digital radios available in consumer electronic shops.

Austria is committed to a digital radio future and a report by the regulators, the Austrian Communications Authority (KommAustria) and RTR-GmbH recommended DAB+ in Band III as the way forward. As planned, KommAustria completed a call for interest regarding DAB+ in August 2012. KommAustria intended to launch DAB+ by an open call for tender regarding the DAB+ network if enough parties showed believable and sustainable interest. A minimum limit of 12 possible programs (to fill one MUX coverage) was set. This limit was not reached as too few parties showed interest or failed to meet the criteria of the call for interest. Most remarkably, the public broadcaster ORF and the bigger players in the Austrian market did not show interest but strongly voiced their opposition against the launch of DAB+ in Austria. However, there is a group of broadcasters who are very outspoken in favour of DAB+, but the majority of radio stations remain unsure. The public broadcaster ORF has renewed its objection to any DAB+ plans. In the upcoming "Digitalisation Concept" which marks the authority's official strategy and schedule for the digitalisation of broadcasting, KommAustria plans to elaborate on the technical details of a possible DAB+ network. There will be no further calls for interest but the possibility for a call for tender upon request. Nevertheless, a working group that was created in 2009 to consider the countries digital future is still at work. Its members are stakeholders from the Austrian radio market who represent opponents and proponents of digital radio. It consists of the regulatory authority, the public broadcaster ORF, the commercial and non-commercial broadcasters associations, the electronic industry and consumer associations. The group is constantly watching and evaluating the progress of digital radio in other European countries. The success of digital radio in Germany will affect whether Austria decides to implement DAB+.

The Austrian Association of the Electrical and Electronic Industry (FEEI), and Austrian radio stations such as Radio Arabella and LoungeFM have founded the digital radio club, Digital Radio Austria. The aim of the new organisation is the promotion and development of digital radio in Austria, developing the media category "Radio" in the digital media world, the establishment of radio on new platforms and to promote the provision of information and support for education and training in the field of electronic and new media.

== Belgium ==
=== French (Wallonia and Brussels) ===
The Radio Télévision Belge de la Communauté Française (RTBF) is the public broadcaster for the Belgian French speaking community. Since 1997, RTBF has operated one DAB multiplex simulcasting its five FM radio stations and two BRF (the Belgian German speaking public broadcaster) FM radio stations, covering of Brussels and Wallonia. On this multiplex, RTBF is also testing four DAB+ audio and data channels (indifferent bit rates and with slideshows) for itself and also for the private radio stations. The aim is to plan a roadmap for DAB+ in French speaking Belgium together with the private broadcasters, subject to approval from the French Community Government and the regulator, the CSA. In Spring 2011 a common vision of the main broadcasters, both private and public, was defined with a four-tier strategy for migration from analogue to digital radio (DAB+ broadcast; hybrid radio; single online radio player and radio on TV). In summer 2011 the Parliament of the French-speaking Community adopted unanimously a resolution asking the French-speaking Government to support the migration to digital radio from 2011 onwards.

The CSA (regulator) launched a public consultation about digital radio in autumn 2011 which provided positive feedback. In spring 2012, the CSA recommended to the Government a DAB+ rollout based mainly on two layers in Band III. In June 2012 the Government authorized RTBF to proceed with DAB+ trials for commercial and non-profit radio stations licensed by the CSA.

The next step is to achieve a public funding agreement to finance the investments needed for the technical DAB+ rollout, upgrade of the RTBF DAB network to DAB+ to ensure deep indoor coverage of Brussels and Wallonia, for a potential public launch in 2015 (to mark the 101st anniversary of the first radio broadcasting in Belgium). RTBF is testing Radio DNS interactive slideshows on its DAB+ channels.

=== Flemish (Flanders and Brussels) ===
The Vlaamse Radio- en Televisieomroeporganisatie (VRT) is the public broadcaster for the Belgian Flemish Community. VRT has one DAB multiplex in operation with eight radio stations: the 5 FM-also stations Radio 1, Radio 2, Klara, Studio Brussel and MNM and three digital-only channels: Nieuws+ (news), Klara Continuo (non-stop classic and older music) and MNM Hits (Top 40). Norkring, which operates VRT's multiplex, also has a license for another multiplex and is wording on a DAB+ roll out. In February 2013 Norkring launched a "call for interest" for a DAB+ roll-out in the Northern part of Belgium. Based on the results of this call, Norkring has launched a second call to include a progressive deployment, with the Brussels DAB+ roll-out in the first phase.

In May 2016, the Flemish government announced the intent to have all nationwide Flemish radio stations broadcast exclusively in DAB+ by 2022.

The VRT was to switch from DAB to DAB+ on 17 October 2017 and to discontinue DAB service at the same time.

Norkring also broadcasts BBC World Service, clubfm, VBRO Evergreen, Family Radio, Joe, Qmusic, Radio Maria, TOPradio and VBRO Radio. The number of transmitters will increase from 5 to 10 in April 2018 and 20 in September 2018. It also began broadcasting RTBF Mix on DAB+ on 2 May 2019, which became RTBF's only over-the-air radio station in Flanders.

=== Country wide ===
As VRT and RTBF's multiplexes together cover the whole country's main road networks, since 2012 they have been broadcasting data traffic information (via TPEG) on behalf of Be Mobile, a company specialising in the provision of traffic and mobility content. Their first client was Toyota Belgium.

== Czechia ==
Three network operators, Czech Radio, TELEKO and RTI CZ, broadcast DAB+ in Czechia. Czech radio network covers over 95% population. There are many regional broadcasters with only one small transmitter.

== Denmark ==
Public service broadcaster DR began regular services of DAB in 2002. Denmark has one of the highest numbers of DAB users per capita in the world, with 40% of the population having access to a DAB/DAB+ radio set. In 2016 a total of 36% of all radio listening was on digital platforms (DAB and online).

The parliamentary Media Agreement 2012-2014 stipulates that the FM band will close in 2019 if at least 50% of radio listening is on digital platforms by that time. The closure of FM radio in Denmark has been canceled, and there is no known date for future closure.

On 1 October 2017 a nationwide switch from DAB to DAB+ took place and three DAB multiplexes became available:
DAB MUX 1
Digital Radio Cibicom is the gatekeeper of this multiplex broadcasting commercial national radio.
DAB MUX 2
National public service stations. DR's 7 channels (including the 10 regional variations of DR P4), as well as the privately owned, public service channel Radio4.
DAB MUX 3
Regional and local commercial radio.

Signal coverage is officially said to cover the entirety of Denmark, No known broadcasts are known to have taken place on the Faroe Islands or Greenland, potentially as all their stations still fit on the FM band.

== France ==
The CSA has set Friday, 20 June 2014 as the start date of the broadcast for digital radio for the authorised radio stations in the areas of Marseille, Nice and Paris.

The rule states that the start date is set at least six months in advance. This period will enable publishers of radio and multiplex operators to conduct all necessary technical and commercial operations launch services.

DAB+ is now part of the multiplex allocation in France. The original CSA publication called T-DMB and each radio station had 104/1000 of the multiplex. T-DMB is still part of the possible technology for RNT in France however with DAB+, each radio station has 76/1000 of the multiplex.

The authorisation for the multiplex operators was given mid October 2013.

Radio Galère is now allowed to broadcast in Marseille in DAB+ until the end of the 2013; The TDF and France Multiplex may also continue to broadcast in Lyon in T-DMB and DAB+ until the end of June 2014. Nantes was already allowed until the end of the year. In January 2012 it was reported by the French newspaper 'Les Echos' that the CSA had requested the Ministry of Industry to include DAB+ in the technical standard for France. The consultation for this closed in May 2012 and the technical decree was released 16 August 2013, including DAB+ to the list of permitted standards. At the end of 2007, France's Government announced that the official standard for digital radio in France would be DMB-A, to be marketed as Radio Numérique Terrestre (RNT).

At the end of 2013, the French Parliament will examine an update of the 1986 law about radio and television. Then the CSA should publish a timetable for a call for applications for tenders for digital terrestrial licenses for France's next 20 biggest cities which will add up to 62% coverage. An additional tender will also allow to add DAB+ services to the 14 multiplexes in Paris, Marseille and Nice, as well as five more multiplexes in these towns.

In April 2012 the CSA re-launched a call of tender for three cities (Paris for seven multiplexes, Marseille and Nice for six multiplexes each). The four main commercial radio groups decided do not bid and the government did not allow the public service (Radio France) to pre-empt frequencies. At the beginning of October 2012 the CSA published the candidates selected for the three cities. At the beginning of 2014, six multiplexes will be on air in Paris, four in Marseille and four in Nice.

Roll out of terrestrial digital radio was scheduled to start in December 2009 but was postponed amid opposition from several sources, including private radio operators. The Prime Minister commissioned a further report by David Kessler, former chief executive France Culture, which was published in mid-2011 and suggested that the conditions had not been met for the full scale deployment of digital radio in France. The report suggested a moratorium of two to three years during which time the French market would look at the deployment of digital radio in the rest of Europe. The report also stated that the government approved the CSA's decision to allow further trials to continue.

The CSA is responsible for taking the findings of the Kessler report forward and in order to do this set up an 'Observatory' which includes all of the industry players. The publication of the Kessler report meant the market could move forward after a period of stagnation and to this end various trials were put on-air (Paris, Nantes, Marseille and Lyon).

=== Martinique ===
A trial multiplex was launched on Martinique between 1 January 2023 and 31 June 2024, with stations including the radio station of Martinique La Première, Radio Fusion, Mixx FM, and Identité Radio. As of 11 November 2024 there is no readily available info on what happened after the official end of the trial.

=== Réunion ===
2 trial multiplexes were launched on Réunion on 1 March 2024, mostly featuring smaller Réunion-based stations like Capital FM, RJL Radio, and Hit FM.

== Germany ==
By the end of 2013 more than 120 national, regional and local programs would have been broadcast in Germany. More than 90% of the German population would also able to listen to at least one digital radio ensemble, two years after the launch.

Despite some changes in the national multiplex, the prospect for both commercial and public broadcasters is very positive as receiver sales are increasing. Furthermore, a stable ecosystem of private digital radio stations could be established in metropolitan areas such as Frankfurt, Berlin and Munich.

The current focus of broadcasters and network operators is to continue their marketing efforts in all media. For this reason the initiative 'Digitalradio Deutschland' was founded by the commercial broadcasters on the national multiplex (represented by DRD GmbH), the ARD group, Deutschlandradio and the network operator Media Broadcast. The goal is to coordinate the b2b and b2c marketing initiatives of all stakeholders to foster the evolution of digital radio in Germany by obtaining a reasonable market penetration by end of 2014.

Coordination with the device industry is carried out via the initiative 'Digitalradio Deutschland', organised by the German Federal Ministry of Economics and Technology (BMWi). Five working groups were created to guide all areas of digital radio development and roll out, such as receiver/devices, data and traffic services, networks or advertisements.

The initiative hired consumer electronics market professionals which significantly improved the communication with the retailers. Many stores are now equipped with in-house-coverage solutions. The German car manufacturers offer DAB+ receivers for nearly all models either as an option or line fit. Two commercial telematics service providers use data capacity on the national mux to transmit TPEG based traffic information via DAB. The impressive coverage of Germany's highways over the last two years was secured through market collaboration and support for the technology.

== Greece ==
The first broadcast of digital radio in Greece occurred on 5 Jan. 2018, from the ERT (Greece's public broadcaster) facilities in Ymittos. Seven radio programs of ERT are being sent on channel 12C using DAB+.

ERT launched its own digital multiplexer just one month after the publication of the private digital broadcasting bill. From the channel 12C multiplexer (frequency 227.36) the First, Second and Third Program, Kosmos, ERA Sport and Voice of Greece, as well as a program called ERA7, broadcasting sound from the Parliament channel, are being broadcast, reports radiofono.gr.

The DAB+ transmission is clearly in the test phase – the technical characteristics are constantly shifting.

Channel 12C will cover the whole of Central Greece and Attica with a single-frequency network based on the pre-existing frequency map developed a decade ago. The newly updated frequency map has not yet been published.

DAB radios are available in almost all electronic appliances shops.

Frequency planning has allocated a national multiplex and one for each of Greece's nine regions.

== Italy ==
Regular services in Italy started in December 2012 in the Trentino region following a decree by AGCOM.

On 29 July 2015 AGCOM published the definition of 39 local areas covering all of Italy, a The majority of band III has to be reserved for DAB+. Two consortia in Trento received the rights on Band III with Channel 10A assigned to DBTAA and Channel 12D to Digiloc. The rights to Channel 10B and 10D have been assigned to RAS and Channel 10C to DABMedia in Bolzano.

As March 2018, five consortia of local broadcasters and 8 local broadcasters are on air. In total there are 116 DAB+ stations simulcast on FM and 20 DAB+ stations available exclusively on DAB+ digital radio. Traditionally, Italy has a quite unique radio market, which reflects the current situation.

The combined coverage of the broadcasts is estimated to be around 83% of the Italian population (i.e. people in reach of DAB+transmissions for outdoor coverage).

The Italian Government has committed to a road map for DAB+ development, a key part of this will be a plan for coordinated frequency planning. AGCOM also renewed commitment to putting forward legislation that receivers should have FM and digital capability.

The Italian law requires all radio receivers to have digital capability from 1° Jan 2020.

RAS is planning to shut down the first minor FM transmitter stations in the province of South Tyrol started in December 2017 and will be completed in November 2018.

== Liechtenstein ==
As of August 2024, Radio Liechtenstein was included on a Swiss regional multiplex that covers Liechtenstein and northeast Switzerland. The radio station ceased operations in April 2025.

== Luxembourg ==
In June 2025, the Luxembourgish department of media released an official list of 12 stations that would begin broadcasting in Luxembourg by the end of 2025. The list included RTL Radio (One Luxembourgish and one German version), RTL Today Radio, Radio 100,7, Eldoradio, L'essentiel Radio, Radio ARA, Radio Latina, Lor'FM, Crooner Radio, Nostalgie Luxembourg, and Opus 100,7.

There have been signal spillovers from Belgium and Germany into Luxembourg for some time prior to the 2025 launch, but there is little documentation about it. For instance, the broadcast mast in Arlon, Belgium is located just over 3km from the Luxembourg border.

== Malta ==
Malta was the first European country to roll out a DAB+ network and services were on-air in October 2008. There are nearly 40 services on the two national multiplexes which include unique digital only stations, MOT, EPG and DLS applications. The multiplexes are operated by Digi B Network and cover 100% of the population. By the end of 2012, over 25% of Maltese radio listeners were tuning in via DAB+.

A second national mux (6A – Digi B2) was launched in 2011. The use of the digital radio platform has increased by 4.12% to 13% over the same period last year (January–March 2012) and the use of FM has dropped by 7%. Malta boasts a vibrant and growing DAB+ community of services.

== Monaco ==
A T-DMB test was carried out in VHF Band III on Channel 6A between July 2009 and September 2009. Monaco and the area around it has a transmitter, but due to some technical issues, digital radio in Monaco was put on hold.

Prior to this, the principality of Monaco broadcast DAB digital radio services to 100% of its population of 32,000 people since 2005. Stations on air have included MFM, Radio Classique, Radio Monaco, Riviera Radio and RMC. All were simulcasts of existing FM services.

Services resumed at some point between then and August 2024.

== The Netherlands ==
Currently there is DAB+ with reception in most of the country. Both public and commercial stations are available with a wider choice of stations than regular FM radio. Many stations also offer a second music-only station. By 2015, the network will be further extended with an additional 24 transmitter sites, enabling good indoor reception across virtually all of the Netherlands.

== Norway ==
The government of Norway on 16 April 2015, announced that the country will officially switch-off national FM broadcasting in January 2017. It became the first country in the world to announce an official switch-off date for FM broadcasting. The initial conditions laid by the government was found to be fulfilled in January 2015 to facilitate this transition. The conditions for the transition were:

1. Coverage (absolute condition for FM shutdown): Before 2015, the public broadcaster NRK must achieve coverage of 99.5%, the commercial broadcasters on the national network #1 are required to reach 90% of the population
2. Value added for the listeners (absolute condition for FM shutdown). There must be a value added for the listeners in going from FM to DAB, both in terms of available content and in terms of user experience.
3. Digital listening (condition to be met in order to shut down FM in 2017. Failure to reach it can postpone the shutdown until 2019). Before 2015 50% of the radio listeners must daily use a digital radio platform (currently this is 45%). This does not specify market share of listening, contrary to the UK requirement, only reach. "Digital platform" also includes listening via internet and via the digital TV network. This condition is set in order to measure the listeners' independence of the analogue FM-platform.
4. In-car solution (condition to be met in order to shut down FM in 2017. Failure to reach it can postpone the shutdown until 2019). Before 2015, there must be reasonably priced, well-functioning in-car adaptors on the market. In half of all Norwegian municipalities there must be an offer of in-car DAB-adaptor installation.

After 2017, local stations, except for stations in major cities, had the option to continue FM broadcasting. The report leaves it to the broadcasters to choose between DAB or DAB+ transmissions. By 2017, all DAB broadcasting in Norway is in DAB+ format.

The transition proceeded as planned in 2017, with the NRK and national commercial broadcasters moving entirely to 2 national multiplexes. Regional multiplexes for smaller stations began to be set up around the same time and into the early 2020s. Anti-DAB protest movements among very small local stations in interior areas, including Innlandet County, lasted into the 2020s until regional multiplexes were expanded in those areas.

Signal coverage is officially said to cover almost all of mainland Norway, except some remote mountain areas (mostly national parks).

=== Svalbard ===
Longyearbyen and the wider Isfjorden area (possibly including Barentsburg but unconfirmed) received signals in 2017, with Longyearbyen shutting off civilian FM stations soon after. One AM station for NRK P1 remained in Longyearbyen as of November 2023.

== Poland ==
As of December 2025, Poland has one nationwide DAB+ multiplex, which consists of ten nationwide stations:

- 4 FM-available stations (Jedynka, Dwójka, Trójka, PR24)
- 4 DAB-only stations (Czwórka, Radio Dzieciom, Radio Chopin, Radio Kierowców)
- Radio Poland - DAB-only in Poland, but in some countries also on FM or SW.
- Polish Radio Ukraine Service (Polish: Polskie Radio dla Ukrainy) - DAB-only in Poland, but select programming is offered by Ukraine's national radio service.

The multiplex can include one or two regional stations (at least one of them FM-available), but it differs between Polskie Radio's various regional stations. It can be received in many parts of the country thanks to the presence of eighty transmitters, although it remains unpopular compared to FM radio.

There are also 15 local multiplexes, which carry local stations as well as select national and cross-regional programmes.

== San Marino ==
Although there are no DAB multiplexes that officially serve San Marino, and none that broadcast the two stations of San Marino RTV as of November 2024, the entire country is believed to be covered by nearby Italian multiplexes, with the Montescudo signal tower being approximately 2.3km from the San Marinese village of Faetano.

== Slovenia ==
Regular DAB+ transmission in Slovenia began on 19. September 2016 from seven transmitters, which all broadcast on 215.072 MHz, multiplex 10D. 67% of households and 89% of highways and expressways are covered, as of September 2016. First and only multiplex is currently broadcasting all national programmes (4) and some commercial programmes (9), bringing total number of programmes to 14, with all major radio stations announcing, that they are interested in broadcasting in digital technology in the near future.

Once the first multiplex is filled with radio content (about 20 programmes), tenders for additional multiplexes will be published.

Until November 2013 Slovenia's public broadcaster, RTV Slovenia, broadcast four DAB services - Prvi program, Val 202, Ars and Radio Slovenia International from Krvavec transmitter on a trial multiplex 12B (frequency 225.648 MHz, vertical polarization) covering the capital city of Ljubljana and central Slovenia. About half a million people, or 22.5% of the population, were potentially able to receive DAB transmissions. In January it was announced that they have obtained a frequency allocation for a national network of DAB+ transmitters, covering 73% of Slovene households and 89% of highways and expressways. Test broadcasting on said frequency began on 2 September 2016 from Krvavec transmitter, shortly after that RTV Slovenia began nationwide regular transmission on 19. September 2016.

== South Korea ==
As the first country to commercially launch mobile TV, South Korea is the most successful DMB market in the world. More than 62 million DMB enabled devices have been sold, of which the most popular are mobile phones. This number is expected to rise even more with an increase in coverage; services already cover over 80% of the country. Hundreds of DMB devices are available in this market and usage of mobile TV increases year on year. Interactive services are also growing in popularity adding value to broadcasting services.

The Korean government has set up a digital audio project to recommend a digital audio broadcasting standard for Korea. Following ETRI's investigation of various digital radio platforms, a major decision is expected regarding the adoption of a digital radio technology for South Korean broadcasters.

Korea's latest innovation is an interactive mobile TV service, or Smart DMB, launched in May 2011 with six terrestrial-DMB operators (T-DMB). With Smart DMB, mobile TV viewers are able to search the internet, receive EPG information updates, and even enjoy 'TV Screen Capture and Share Service' through SNS while watching television. Moreover, hybrid DMB was launched in August 2013 for the high quality video service.

A DAB+ trial has been on air in Seoul since December 2013.

== Spain ==
The first DAB trials in Spain started on 23 June 1996.

A total of 18 DAB audio services are on air. Population coverage is currently 20%. The Spanish DAB Association that comprised both national private and public broadcasters, were responsible for DAB/DAB+ in Spain as of May 2014.

Spain first began broadcasting terrestrial digital radio in April 1998 covering Madrid, Barcelona and Valencia. From 2002 to June 2011, 23 transmitters covered the 52% of the Spanish population through three national multiplexes (1 SFN and 2 MFN). In addition, in some Comunidades Autónomas, DAB services were launched on additional regional multiplexes, but they are currently switched off.

The Council of Ministers reached an agreement on Digital Radio in June 2011 and approved a Digitalisation Plan for Terrestrial Broadcasting with the following measures:

1. Reduction of DAB coverage from 52% to 20%, in order to facilitate a migration to DAB+
2. Flexibility for the broadcasters, in order to allow for migration to DAB+
3. Study of a possible reassignment of the multiplexes
4. Promotional activities through the Spanish DAB Forum
5. DAB+ trials
6. A study of the necessary conditions to determine the date of a possible analogue switch off

As of December 2021, the cities of Algeciras and Ceuta were said to receive DAB+ signals from Gibraltar.

== Sweden ==
DAB transmissions in Sweden started on 27 September 1995 and today the coverage (MUX1) is 35% of the population with services from public service broadcaster Swedish Radio (SR). The license under which SR operates is valid until 31 December 2019.

During the years several propositions have been put forward to the Parliament suggesting a larger digital radio network roll-out for public service broadcaster SR. This is seen as the first step to a switchover from analogue FM to digital DAB/DAB+.

In 2009, trial transmissions of DAB+ started and the coverage (MUX 2) quickly reached 22% of the population with 16 services from public service radio, commercial radio and community local radio.

In 2010, the Radio and TV Act came into effect which, for the first time, allowed commercial radio companies to apply for digital licenses. This paved the way for a radio industry united behind DAB+, something for which both public and commercial services have been lobbying for. At the same time, the Swedish Government allocated spectrum for a total of four nationwide multiplexers in VHF band III to digital radio DAB/DAB+. Two multiplexers are reserved for SR and two multiplexers are reserved for commercial radio. Three of the multiplexers are regionally MFNs and one multiplexer is a nationwide SFN on channel 12B.

In 2012, the license regulator (MRTV) started the license process for commercial digital radio. All major commercial broadcasters, representing 91% of all listening not counting SR, applied for a total of 22 audio programme licenses spread over 2 commercial multiplexers.

In 2013, the Government appointed a Digital radio Industry Coordinator to put forward a Digital Switchover (DSO) plan at the latest in November 2014 after consultation with SR and the commercial radio broadcasters. The purpose of this plan is to put forward a proposition on DSO for a decision by the Swedish Parliament.

In 2014 the radio industry saw the commercial licenses issued. However the Switchover Plan put forward by the Digital Radio Industry Coordinator. was rejected by the government June 2015 after a negative consultation round which included the telecom authority (PTS). The government also received serious objections by the National Audit Office. The rejection of the DSO plan was finally confirmed by a unanimous vote in the Parliament 3 February 2016.

Despite being among the first to do trial broadcasts, expanding the signals to further regions and cities have gone very slowly. As of August 2023, DAB signals are only broadcast in the greater Stockholm-Uppsala region, Gothenburg, Malmö, Luleå, and Piteå, with no known plans from any of the 3 broadcast licence companies to extend coverage to other regions, leaving out fairly many urban cities like Jönköping, Kalmar, Sundsvall, and Karlstad, among others.

In the absence of local signal towers, Helsingborg, Strömstad, Årjäng, and Storlien are said to receive signals from neighbouring countries.

== Switzerland ==
The Federal Office of Communications awarded a radio licence to the Digris AG company for the operation of DAB+ islands throughout Switzerland.

Today there is one national (with four regional multiplexes for the four different languages) two regional and one local multiplexes, covering the German, French and Italian speaking areas of the country, with a mix of public and commercial services. In the middle of October 2012 the standard DAB was switched to the standard DAB+. Two to three programs per region will remain on simulcast service DAB/DAB+ until 2015.

The original four multiplexes are run by the public broadcaster SRG SSR, the first commercial DAB+ multiplex which was launched on 13 October 2009 now broadcasts 14 commercial radio stations in the German-speaking part of Switzerland. A second local commercial DAB+ multiplex started in December 2012 in the German-speaking part with six commercial radio- and three public radio stations and a first regional commercial DAB+ multiplex in the French-speaking part will start at the end of 2013.

Switzerland first launched DAB digital radio services in 1999 when the public broadcaster, SRG SSR went on air. Marketing activities started in 2006.

In November 2016, the stations regulated by public law will have fully migrated from DAB to DAB+, while FM broadcasts are expected to cease in 2024.

== United Kingdom ==
The UK radio industry is committed to a digital future for radio and is working towards a Digital Radio Switchover.

Government criteria for setting a date for digital radio switchover are:

- Digital listening share reaching 50% of all listening hours
- Local commercial and national DAB coverage reaches the same level as for FM
- Significant progress on conversion of cars to digital radio

A Memorandum of Understanding signed by the Government the BBC and commercial operators in 2012 establishes an agreement in principle to fund the build-out of local DAB to FM equivalence over the next five years, with a commitment to consider further funding if necessary.

The BBC has committed to build-out its national networks to 97% and at least five new local multiplexes will launch in the next year. Significant signal boosts in London, Manchester, Leeds have improved coverage for thousands of households and there are more to come during 2013–14.

The 2014 DCMS Digital Radio Action Plan can be found here: Digital radio action plan

Following the Government's statement on digital radio at the end of 2013 it has now published a range of supporting documents here. These include a preliminary analysis of the effect of a switchover, as well as a number of documents addressing technical and communications issues.

=== Isle of Man ===
Along with an Isle of Man multiplex for BBC stations that had begun broadcasting at an earlier point and which continues to do so, a small local multiplex for Manx FM and Energy FM was granted for a 2023–26 3-year licence from Ofcom and has begun broadcasting as of May 2023. The multiplex initially focuses on the city of Douglas and uphill northwest to approximately Crosby.

=== Channel Islands ===
DAB+ signals were set up on Jersey and Guernsey in 2021, covering the entirety of the Channel Islands archipelago. As of August 2024 there were 22 stations broadcasting on those signals.

=== Gibraltar ===
DAB+ broadcasts in Gibraltar began in December 2012. As of August 2024 it broadcasts four stations: The three stations of Gibraltar Broadcasting Corporation, and the Gibraltar-based commercial station Rock Radio, all four of which are simulcasts of FM or AM stations.

== Ukraine ==
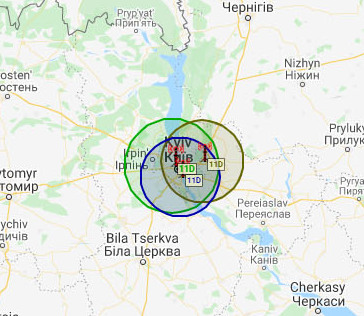
DAB+ coverage in Kyiv, Ukraine (2021)

In 2018, DAB+ launched in Kyiv as channel 11D, and as of 2021, there were three stations operated by public broadcaster Ukrainian Radio, one state-owned Army FM, and more than a dozen commercial channels.

Since 2022, due to the Russian invasion of Ukraine, most commercial broadcasters in Kyiv stopped DAB+ broadcasting (due to war losses, business closures, or because they switched back to FM, which is more popular among listeners) and further development of DAB+ is unclear.

As of April 2025, there were only seven stations broadcasting in Kyiv in DAB+, including three by public broadcasters and one by a state-owned broadcaster. There are dozens of commercial FM stations broadcasting, as FM persists in Kyiv and all around the country.

== Vatican State ==
One of the multiplexes for the Rome/Lazio area, which also covers the Vatican State, broadcasts four versions of the Vatican State's official radio station Radio Vaticana.

Owing to the country being in the middle of Rome, it also receives a large number of other Rome, Lazio, and Italian national stations from nearby transmitters.

== Unclear or defunct ==
=== Brunei ===
In 2007 RTB (Radio Television Brunei, the public and main broadcaster) began a DAB trial, originally to last for five years to include simulcast services. Five RTB stations are broadcast on DAB in Brunei.

A task force has been set up within RTB, which is working closely with AITI (Authority for Info-communications Technology Industry of Brunei) on the plans for a commercial launch.

=== Canada ===
Canada tested DAB services in the L-Band, in five major cities: Toronto, Montreal, Vancouver, Windsor, and Ottawa in 1999. This covered a third of the population. The unique requirements for DAB receivers to work inside Canada led to slow consumer uptake due to high receiver prices and reduced availability of L-Band DAB receivers. Also, the US has opted for a different system of digital radio broadcast, which further reduced the market availability of L-Band DAB receivers. The L-Band assigned for DAB is currently considered for DMB services in Canada. CRTC had initial plans for DAB to replace all AM/FM radio stations in 1996, but lack of adoption led to the decision to keep AM/FM stations. All DAB bouquets in Canada have been discontinued.

A few stations in Canada are now using the American in-band on-channel (IBOC) digital radio platform.

=== China ===
China's State Administration of Radio, Film, and Television (SARFT), chose DAB for the standard for digital audio services in May 2006, and tested DMB services in the following years. Beijing Jolon, GTM in Guangzhou and other broadcasters provided DMB services during the Olympic Games in 2008. DAB is now on air in three cities (Beijing and Hong Kong in Band III and Shanghai in L-Band).

Some of them provide several DMB services among audio services. Beijing Jolon, the biggest local broadcaster in Beijing, has launched 'Push Radio' based on DAB in 2010 in Beijing. Beijing Jolon broadcasts 30 hours – or 25 program channels every day through Push Radio. 16 Audio programs are broadcast 15 times per day and downloaded onto receivers. Value added services such as news, data and slideshow have been provided through Push Radio services. Cooperating with Commercial Radio Australia (CRA), Beijing Jolon has upgraded their latest generation receivers to support DAB+ and is trialling Push Radio in Australia.

=== Croatia ===
Trials using DAB were launched by Croatian Radiotelevision (HRT), the biggest Croatian public broadcaster, in 1997. Centred around Zagreb, the HRT multiplex broadcast simulcasts of its three national radio services. This trial has been completed in 2011.

In September 2017 state owned network operator Odašiljači i veze announced that during November 2017 a trial broadcasting of DAB+ services will begin and invited interested radio stations to express their desire to participate in trial.

=== Ghana ===
On 14 May 2008 FonTV, Africa's first mobile phone enabled television content service, was launched via DMB. The network is operated by Black Star TV in collaboration with OneTouch and VDL. This launch followed on from a successful trial that ran in Accra during 2007.

FonTV is a subscription based service costing around 2 Euros a month. Black Star TV operates three mobile TV services, including the BBC World News and ultimately hopes to provide up to six TV channels and four digital radio services. While coverage is currently limited to the areas around Accra and Kumasi, the operator has plans to roll out FonTV across the country.

=== Hong Kong ===
The first stage of broadcasting seven channels in DAB+ on a 24-hour basis in Hong Kong started in August 2011. After the completion of the network construction of seven hilltop sites on 19 June 2012, 17 out of the 18 channels broadcast formally.

The Government issued DAB+ licences to three commercial operators – DBC HK (Digital Broadcasting Corporation HongKong Ltd, formerly Wave Media), Metro Broadcast and Phoenix U Radio, together with the public broadcaster, RTHK.

Four broadcasters broadcast via DAB+ on Mux 11C(220.352 MHz) in VHF Band III. The four DAB+ stakeholders have formed a Consortium (an Industry Working Group) which together with its Technical Committee looked after detailed network implementation. A Marketing Committee was formed to plan marketing and promotional activities. RTHK operated and maintained the network on behalf of the Consortium and the seven hilltop sites.

The three commercial operators - DBC HK (Digital Broadcasting Corporation Hong Kong Ltd, formerly Wave Media), Metro Broadcast and Phoenix U Radio discontinued their services during 2015 to 2016 due to low revenue from advertisements, mostly attributed to the small audience of digital broadcasting in Hong Kong. The Executive Council of Hong Kong has decided on 28 March 2017 to discontinue all digital broadcasting services in six months. RTHK discontinued its 5 DAB channels on midnight on 4 September 2017. All DAB services in Hong Kong has ceased to exist since.

=== Hungary ===
Hungary chose DAB+ for its digital radio standard, and there was a test multiplex on air broadcasting seven radio programs to the Budapest area. The multiplex was operated by Antenna Hungária, which also runs DVB-T multiplexes, national TV and radio stations in Hungary.

Pursuant to the contract concluded with the former National Communications Authority (actually National Media and Infocommunications Authority) by December 2008 Antenna Hungária had constructed the first phase of its digital terrestrial radio network. Thereafter the Company started experimental broadcasting on its DAB+ digital terrestrial radio network, which is received since 23 January 2009 in and around Budapest.

From the beginning, the programs that could be heard are the channels of Magyar Rádió: Kossuth, Petőfi and Bartók (and then could still be heard the three channels of Swiss Satellite Radio). The experimental broadcast was supplemented in mid-February 2009 by adding Sláger Rádió and Magyar Katolikus Rádió (Hungarian Catholic Radio), in April (together with two channels ceased to be broadcast until that time) Klubrádió as well as Danubius Radio and Juventus Rádió (which is not transmitted from 3 January 2011) in October raising then the number of channels to thirteen, providing listeners with a broader variety of programs.

From 19 November 2009, Sláger Rádió and Danubius Rádió were cancelled from the list after terminating the nationwide broadcast of their programs. However, the program of Lánchíd Rádió and Inforádió were put on the DAB+ radio system on 19 November 2009 and 17 February 2010. From 3 January 2011, there were 7 available radio programs within the frames of the experimental DAB+ broadcasting in Hungary: Kossuth, Petőfi, Bartók Rádió and Magyar Katolikus Rádió, Klubrádió, Lánchíd Rádió, Inforádió.

However, on 6 September 2020, the National Media and Infocommuncations Authority has shut down DAB in Hungary, citing a lack of interest from the listeners and the market.

On 1 October 2021, a local multiplex was set up for testing purposes on channel 10D, broadcasting from Széchenyi-hegy with an ERP of 10W. It included four channels, all broadcasting the same content, but with different bitrate and FEC. The aim of the test was to investigate the possibilities of small scale DAB+ multiplexes, which should provide more information necessary for the transition to DAB+ in the future. The multiplex was shut down after a month.

=== Indonesia ===
The Indonesian government has announced an official decree that Indonesia has chosen the DAB family of standards as the national standard for digital radio. Indonesia is the largest country in south-east Asia with a population of around 240 million. DMB trials have been running in the capital, Jakarta, since 2006. There are four services on air. The trial is operated by the regulator and MNC, the largest media company in Indonesia.

=== Ireland ===
In late 2020 it was announced that all DAB radio transmissions would be shut down the following year due to low usage numbers for the service. On 2 March 2021 it was confirmed that the service would be terminated at the end of that month.

Ireland's public service broadcaster, RTÉ operated a full-service Multiplex across a five transmitter network covering 52% of the population in the main cities until late March 2021.

Two commercial trials were run in Dublin, Cork and the South-East of the country carrying a mix of FM simulcasts and DAB exclusive stations operated by independent companies dB Digital Broadcasting Ltd and Total Broadcasting Ltd. Legislation has been in place since 2009 to enable commercial broadcasters to engage with DAB but the broadcasting regulator has not addressed the issue of establishing a regulatory framework to date.

It was expected that Ireland would adopt the DAB+ standard. However, there are currently no commercial or public service broadcasters using DAB technology and the future of the technology as part of the Irish radio broadcasting landscape remains uncertain.

According to 2018 analysis maps by the United Kingdom's Ofcom, spillovers of Northern Ireland signals into Republic of Ireland were scarce, with only Monaghan and Letterkenny being believed to receive signals among significant Republic of Ireland towns.

=== Israel ===
In 1996, the telecommunications company Bezeq started broadcasting a national DAB multiplex in Israel on a test basis. As of 2004, stations on the multiplex included the public Kol Yisrael stations Reshet Bet and Reshet Gimel, and the Israel Defense Forces stations Army Radio and Galgalatz.

The broadcast ended in 2008 when the Ministry of Communications issued an invitation to tender for a national multiplex using the DAB+ standard, for which no applications were received. As of 2021, Israel does not use DAB.

=== Latvia ===
On 17 November 2016, the National Electronic Mass Media Council (NEPLP) allowed Latvian public radio Latvijas Radio to start testing DAB+. The testing would continue until 16 November 2017.
On 29 December 2022, the NEPLP made a decision to approve the National Strategy for the Development of the Electronic Media Sector for 2023–2027. According to the adopted strategy, the introduction of DAB/DAB+ in Latvia is considered as economically and technically inexpedient.

=== Malaysia ===
Since the launch of its first pilot DAB+ trials in late 2009 in the capital city of Kuala Lumpur, there is no decision yet on the time line for the implementation of digital radio and broadcasting services in Malaysia. The sole DAB+ equipment (from head-end to transmitter) are owned and operated by the public broadcaster, Radio TV Malaysia (RTM).

In February 2013, RTM invited local agencies such as the Malaysian Communications and Multimedia Commission (MCMC), various members of the local radio industry and Telecoms Malaysia to a joint field trial study. Some elements of the field trials included identifying minimum reception figures for in building reception loss, minimum figures for acceptable mobile reception and speed tests.

Considering the power of the trial DAB+ transmitter of 1 kW, the results of the field trial are in line with figures already established by the ITU and in broadcasting agencies in Australia.

15 FM radio programs are available on the DAB+ platform, nine from RTM and six from the commercial radio stations.

Efforts are underway to study/familiarise staff with other aspects of the DAB+ system such as adding Slideshow (SLS) and text (DL) in order to maximize the full potential of DAB+.

=== Mexico ===
Mexico had tested various radio problems in the 1990s, including Eureka 147. The trials were not well received by northern Mexican radio stations, whose owners feared losing access to American audiences, as that country had already decided against DAB. While there was support for digital radio via the DAB family of standards among some Mexican broadcasters, the primary use of the L-Band in Mexico is for maritime transmissions and space communications.

In 2008, the Federal Telecommunications Commission authorized IBOC (American in-band on-channel) for all stations within 320 kilometres (200 mi) of the US border. In 2011, Cofetel allowed other stations in the country to use IBOC.

=== New Zealand ===
Digital radio services have not been introduced into New Zealand, other than on a trial basis. These trials have been licensed by the Ministry of Business, Innovation and Employment, but as yet there has been no requirement to develop wider policies concerning digital radio services.

New Zealand's government-owned broadcast and telecoms company, Kordia, had been operating a DAB test service in Auckland and Wellington since October 2006 with two transmitters operating in Band III. The multiplex delivered a mix of DAB and DAB+ services, including twelve audio channels at the conclusion of the trial, slideshow and EPG. No DAB+ rollout is planned.

New Zealand's Ministry of Business, Innovation and Employment allocated 22 MHz in Band III for DAB+ (December 2017).

Kordia would launch commercial DAB+ multiplexes if the New Zealand radio industry was interested (February 2018).

The DAB trial ended on 30 June 2018 with the expiry of licences 261444/5.

=== Portugal ===
Expansion of the DAB network awaits a decision by the Portuguese government. It is likely that future rollout will use DAB+ or DMB. A trial operated by RDP (now RTP) ran from 3 August 1998 until 1 April 2011, using one multiplex carrying Antena 1, Antena 2, Antena 3, RDP África and RDP Internacional, covering around 72% of the population. There is no available station now.

=== Romania ===
The first trial of DAB digital radio occurred in Bucharest on 2004. Regular services in Romania started on 9 January 2012 on the Bucharest region. There is one trial multiplex on air broadcasting a total of six DAB services from public broadcaster Radio Romania. However, in September 2021, Romania turned off DAB broadcasting. Main cause is lack of interest both from listeners and broadcasters, low sales (and also low availability) of DAB receivers and the wider spread and acceptance of internet radio. Sales of DAB receivers where available in stores was also low, and DAB listeners were very few, due to low coverage, being available only in Bucharest.

=== Russia ===
A decision on the DAB family of standards in Russia has not yet been made due to an issue with frequency availability. However some western manufacturers of DAB+ equipment have become interested in entering the Russian market and are willing to finance the deployment of an experimental broadcasting zone on trial.

The village of Nikel in Murmansk Oblast is said by Norway to receive DAB signals from Norway, though this has not been confirmed by Russian sources.

=== Serbia ===
The Ministry of Telecommunications and Information Society has announced that Serbia will switch from analogue to digital radio and television broadcasting by 2015. The Ministry of Telecommunications, the Ministry of Culture and Media, the Broadcasting Agency and the Republican Agency for Telecommunications are working on a common strategy.

=== Singapore ===
MediaCorp launched the DAB service in Singapore in November 1999 and was the first broadcaster in Asia to offer DAB digital radio service. On 1 November 2011, MediaCorp announced its DAB service would cease with effect from 1 December 2011.

Listeners could continue to receive MediaCorp radio through online streaming as well as mobile phone apps alongside the FM services in Singapore. Rediffusion Singapore launched its DAB service in July 2006. It was the first country in the world to introduce subscription based DAB+ digital radio service for the mass market. In April 2012, Rediffusion Singapore announced its service was under receivership and went off-air from 1 May 2012. Its branding and assets were brought over by Eduplus Holdings in June 2012.

There are no plans to turn on the DAB network in Singapore. Services are running via FM and online streaming.

=== South Africa ===
The Joint SADIBA/NAB Digital Radio DAB+ Trial Working group's application for a high–powered DAB+ trial licence has been approved. The trial licence was granted to the South African Broadcasting Corporation (the applicant on behalf of the NAB radio members) by the regulator, the Independent Communications Authority of South Africa (ICASA). The trial will run from 1 April 2014 to 31 March 2015, and Sentech will be the signal distributor for the duration of the trial.

The SADIBA/NAB Working group is encouraged by the commitment of all stakeholders in putting digital radio firmly on the South African broadcasting agenda.

The South African DAB+ trial will consist of two high power transmitting stations (10 kW transmitter power) 100 kW ERP situated in Johannesburg and Pretoria in the province of Gauteng. The trial will operate as a SFN in VHF band III on Channel 13F on a frequency of 239.200 MHz. This will happen after coverage verification at transmitter powers of 2 kW, 5 kW, and 10 kW. The total area covered by the trial is 21185km2 and the total gross population covered is 10 705 387 (21.5% of total SA population). It is envisaged that between 18 and 20 radio from the Public, Commercial and Community sectors will participate in the trial. The trial will allow the testing of: End-to-end technical functionality Extent of portable mobile coverage Signal permeability Demonstrate digital radio services and value-added services Performance in the field using typical consumer equipment and professional test and measurement equipment. The effects of vehicle penetration loss, building penetration loss and clutter (e.g. buildings and vegetation) on coverage. Testing of the various encoding methods (stereo, para stereo, mono) for different audio types and at different bit rates to get a good understanding of what bit rates/encoding to use for the different program types. Investigate the delivery of PAD within these tests, synchronisation with the audio and rate of change of the images. In July 2013 over 200 radio industry representatives came together at the South African Broadcasting Corporation's (SABC) facility in Johannesburg to attend a landmark workshop on the rollout of DAB+ digital radio and to discuss plans for a high-powered DAB+ trial transmission extending from Pretoria to Johannesburg by end 2013. The Independent Communications Authority of South Africa (ICASA), indicated that it stands ready to support broadcasting innovation in South Africa, which will be the first country to exploit opportunities for delivery of educational services via DAB+, as well as services for those with disabilities. Broadcasting radio via DAB+ will also allow ICASA to license new entrants where FM bandwidth is congested.

MobileTV PTY performed technical tests of DMB (Digital Multimedia Broadcasting) and DAB+ in Gauteng from August 2011 until the end of July 2013 and plans to expand trials in South Africa. The prospective broadcaster will launch trials of DMB technology in the Free State and the Western Cape before the end of the 2013. In July 2012 they applied for a commercial license and expect to get an answer during 2013. ICASA has granted test licences for Cape and Bloemfontein, while assessing new applications for Port Elizabeth, East London and Mpumalanga. MobileTV PTY aims to switch on the trials in Cape Town and Bloemfontein on 1 October and 1 November respectively. Their two transmitters will be relocated from Pretoria and Johannesburg Autumn 2013.

MobileTV PTY ran two TV channels and one radio station on a test license. If a license is granted they would then cover 15–20 million of the 45 million people in South Africa and expand coverage in parallel to sales of devices and uptake of services. MobileTV PTY has teamed up with SABC, the public service broadcaster in South Africa. SABC reaches 76% of the population daily and is by far the biggest broadcaster and is partially financed by a TV license and partially by advertisements. MobileTV PTY is in dialogue with the Department of Education to evaluate whether the technology can be used for educational purposes, such as to reach rural schools and colleges in a cost-effective manner. The department is primarily interested in the abilities of data transfer but an educational TV channel has not been ruled out. SABC will offer their 18 radio channels. MobileTV PTY wishes to also offer distribution for private radio stations following the launch.

No programmes are on air. Mobile TV PTY is awaiting a commercial license from the government. If licences are granted they will within the first year cover up to 50% of the population of South Africa, although they aim to increase this to between 80 and 90% within 2–3 years. Their plan is to broadcast 6-10 mobile TV channels and two radio stations. Additional services that combine broadcasting and the internet on the same device will be an essential part of their business model. Such services include traffic information, gambling, integration with social media and touch-screen shopping.

=== Taiwan (Republic of China) ===
The Broadcasting Corporation of China (BCC), a private company with nationwide coverage, operates three AM and three FM networks as well as a digital audio broadcasting system. In July 2010, the Government of the Republic of China announced plans for digital convergence by 2015. During the first stage of the program, from 2010 through 2012, a number of bills being formulated and sent to the legislature for review, including a radio and TV broadcast law. Taiwan has been a supporter of DAB and DAB+ broadcasting and planned for a full implementation of digital broadcasting (both TV and radio) by 2010. Lack of marketing, promotion and consumer awareness has slowed this digital expansion. The new laws being developed should set a firm timeline in place for digital conversion of all media and telecoms. DAB in Taiwan is solely operated by SuperFM on a trial basis. There are seven trial services available including one DMB.

SuperFM broadcasts multiple foreign language programmes, for example in Vietnamese, Thai and Filipino aimed at foreign nationals living in Taiwan but who are unable to listen to their home nation's radio programmes via analogue radio.

Taiwan ended trials in 2016.

=== Thailand ===
Following the successful licence auction for commercial digital TV channels in December 2013, the National Broadcasting and Telecommunications Commission (NBTC) is looking to auction about 4,000 similar licences for digital radio in early 2015.

The licences would be in the nationwide and region-wide categories. There are expected to about 20 nationwide licences. The auction will be held on a phase-by-phase basis.

The NBTC's broadcasting committee will sign a memorandum of understanding with MCOT, the Public Relations Department and the Royal Thai Army at the end of January 2014 to conduct a year-long trial of digital radio broadcasting.

The digital radio service will be provided on VHF (very high frequency) bands that will be returned to the NBTC by the state agencies that own existing analog TV concessions.

The existing analog AM and FM radio frequencies will be allocated for community and public radio. There are 525 AM and FM channels nationwide.

The estimated final price of a commercial digital radio licence would be around Bt100,000. About 10 licences to provide network services to the prospective digital radio operators will also be granted.

The first Thailand Broadcasting Master Plan (2012–2016) states strategies for digital terrestrial radio roll-out, roadmap and policy for digital terrestrial radio roll-out within two years, after the adoption of the Master Plan. DAB+ demonstrations started in Bangkok on 1 March 2013. The International Telecommunication Union (ITU) and the National Broadcasting and Telecommunications Commission (NBTC), jointly organised the "NBTC/ITU Workshop on Digital Radio Technologies" held in Bangkok, Thailand, 1–3 March 2013. The Workshop was supported by WorldDMB, MCOT Public Co., LTd., the Government Public Relations Department, and the Royal Thai Army Radio and Television Station.

NBTC is in the process of developing a policy document for digital radio services that will be published in 2014.

=== Turkey ===
TRT, the Turkish Broadcasting Corporation, has aired DAB test transmissions broadcasting four simulcast services in Band III and covering the capital, Ankara. A second transmitter was also planned for Istanbul. With the completion of Küçük Çamlıca TV Radio Tower and Çanakkale TV Tower in 2020 digital transition began in Istanbul and Çanakkale.

=== Vietnam ===
The public broadcaster in Vietnam, VOV (the Voice of Viet Nam), trialed the DRM standard in 2005, HD-Radio in 2009 and DAB+ in July 2013. The road map for digital broadcasting radio and television 2020 has been granted by the Prime Minister of Vietnam since 2009. The Ministry of Communication and Information got together with other broadcasters in Vietnam: VTV, VOV, VTC and TTNVN to implement the digital broadcasting scheme by 2020.
