= Hellenic Radio =

Main public radio broadcaster in Greece

- Native name: Ελληνική Ραδιοφωνία
- Romanized name: Elliniki Radiofonia
- Industry: Mass media
- Headquarters: ERT Broadcasting House
- Area served: Greece, Worldwide
- Services: Radio
- Owner: ERT
- Parent: ERT
- Website: www.ertecho.gr

The Hellenic Radio (Greek: Ελληνική Ραδιοφωνία; or ERA) is the main public radio broadcaster in Greece. Founded in 1987 as a subsidiary of public broadcaster Hellenic Broadcasting Corporation (ERT), it broadcasts four domestic radio channels and the international shortwave radio channel Voice of Greece.

== History ==
After the collapse of the Greek junta, the conservative Karamanlis government brought the main public television channel EIRT under civilian government control. It was renamed Hellenic Broadcasting Corporation (ERT). Both the second domestic television channel (later renamed ERT2) and public radio broadcasting however remained under the auspices of the Armed Forces Information Service (YENED).

It was only in 1982 that the socialist Papandreou government dissolved YENED and placed all public broadcasting under civilian government control. In 1987, the four domestic channels ERA 1, ERA 2, ERA 3 and ERA 4 as well as the multilingual shortwave service Voice of Greece (ERA 5) were consolidated under the new legal structure Hellenic Radio, a subsidiary of the now overarching Hellenic Broadcasting Corporation (ERT).

The same 1987 law provided for the establishment of municipal and private-sector stations. This wasn't before the first municipal station Athens 98.4 FM already went on air on 31 May 1987 without a proper license, but backed by then-mayor of Athens Miltiadis Evert. Subsequently a number of stations opened and state radio gradually declined in both audience and importance, with large media corporations gaining ground. By 2002, Hellenic Radio however still maintained 19 regional stations throughout the country.

On 11 June 2013, ERA continued its operation with 15 local stations. At the beginning of 2018, trial digital broadcasts began in Attica on the frequency 12C (227.36 MHz).

== Radio stations ==
=== ERΤ regional radio ===
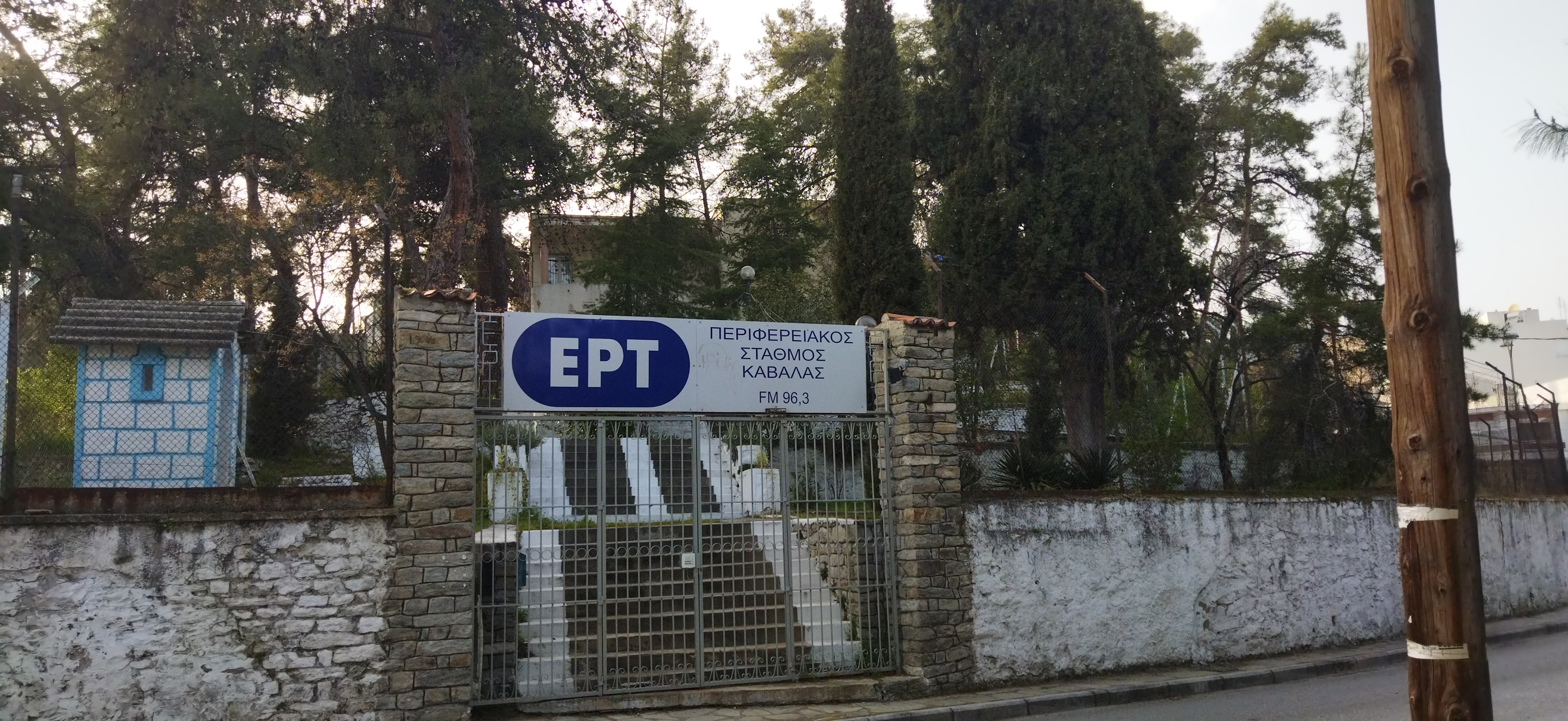
Headquarters of ERT Kavala

- ERΤ Aegean (Mytilene)
- ERΤ Volos
- ERΤ Zakynthos
- ERΤ Heraklion
- ERΤ Ioannina
- ERΤ Kavala
- ERΤ Kalamata
- ERΤ Corfu
- ERΤ Kozani
- ERΤ Komotini
- ERΤ Larissa
- ERΤ Orestiada
- ERΤ Patras
- ERΤ Pyrgos
- ERΤ Rhodes
- ERΤ Serres
- ERΤ Tripoli
- ERΤ Florina
- ERΤ Chania

On weekdays from 7:00 to 10:00, the regional radio stations of the ERΤ network used to send a local news program, covering the individual station's broadcasting area. This was followed by a news program covering the larger region. During the afternoon hours, the stations broadcast an entertainment program, partly adopted from First, Second Programme and ERA Sport.

Some regional radio stations produced their own local program at a second local news bulletin between 18:00 and 20:00, and a mostly entertaining weekend program.

=== Domestic and special interest stations ===
- First Programme (ERA 1)
- Second Programme (ERA 2)
- Third Programme (ERA 3)
- ERA Sport
- Kosmos 93.6
- Voice of Greece
- 102 FM
- 95.8 FM (Greece)
- Zeppelin 106.7

In addition to those above, there are five online radio stations dedicated to specific musical genres; namely Deutero Laika for Rebetiko and Laika music, Kosmos Jazz, Tríto Maestro for classical music, Radio Eurovision (launched ahead of the 2023 contest) and Deytero Paradosiaka for Greek traditional music. Former, discontinued stations are Trito Programma Vrahea, ERT3's international short-wave station and Philia 106.7, a radio station for immigrants in Greece.
