= Haris Vrondos =

Greek composer

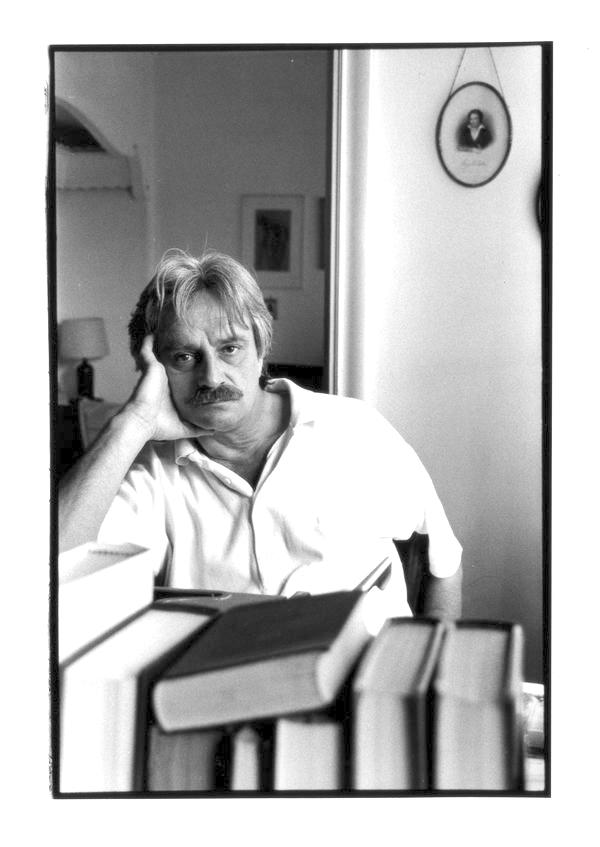

Background information
- Born: 1951 (age 74–75); Vytina, Greece
- Origin: Athens, Greece
- Genres: classical; chamber music; opera
- Occupation: Composer
- Years active: 1969–present

Haris Vrondos (born 1951) is a modern Greek composer.

== Biography ==
Haris Vrondos was born in 1951 in Vytina. In 1963 he started studying guitar in the Lefkada music school. Later, he would move to Athens and take piano lessons Eleni Zioga. At the same time he would also follow the seminars of Günter Becker about electronic music, that would result in the actual start of his career as a composer. The lessons of G.A. Papaioannou on counterpoint will complete his musical education.

He worked as a columnist and musical critic for the Greek newspaper Rizospastis from 1974 to 1976, continuing to write also on the Greek magazines Tipo, Mousiki, To Dentro, Kritiki kai Keimena, High Lights. Beyond these writings he also published four books containing essays and texts about music.

In 1982 he started to collaborate with the Greek National Radio (with the First Programme and the Third Programme) for the presentation and the production of musical and musicological transmissions. In 28 years of collaboration with the Hellenic Radio he reached over 3000 hours of broadcasting.

In 1983, together with other artists, they founded the magazine Nisos that printed musical cassettes with the music and the poetry of the artists affiliated to the journal. The action of the group was enriched by the many shows and recitals that they were doing in the city of Athens and in the close cities.

His relevance in the Greek musical scene brought him to be member of the board of the Union of the Greek Composers (from 1987 to 1990).

== Musical career ==
His work can be divided into three periods:

1. 1969-80: a period that comprehends the amateur phase and the experimentation. It includes the works from Αυτοκτονίες (1969) until Μονόλογο (1981).
2. 1982-86: this period is characterised by works of mixed nature (Proti Simfonia, 1982, Mavri Mousiki, 1985, and Deuteri Simfonia, 1986) and stylistically emphasises the end of romanticism through elements of modernism.
3. 1986 until present: this period is marked by the compositions of the operas: Οι Δαιμονισμένοι (The Possessed), Αλκιβιάδης (Alcibiades), Ρέκβιεμ Αχμάτοβα (Requiem), Η Δίκη (The Trial), Ιδανικοί αυτόχειρες (Idanikoi Autoxeires) and the cantata Ιουλιανός ο Παραβάτης (Julian The Apostate). In this last period Vrondos searches for his personal style.

Xaris Vrondos has composed music for associations like The Athens Concert Hall Association, ALEA III, the University of Boston, the Greek Ballet, the Union of Greek Composers, the Municipality of Thessaloniki and the Paris-Sorbonne University. He also made live concerts with his works of chamber music (Προοδευτικός Σύνδεσμος Υμηττού, 1980 - Ωδείο Athenaeum, 1995 - Εθνική Πινακοθήκη, 1996 - Μουσείο Μπενάκη, 2002 και 2006), whereas also his soloist and orchestral works have been played in Greece and Abroad. Starting from 2014 he has been organising plays, presenting and writing pockets operas and chamber music.

== Compositions ==
=== Cantatas ===
- 1976 - Περιμένοντας τους βαρβάρους - libretto by the composer, inspired from the poem of Konstantinos Kavafis Waiting for the Barbarians.
- 1997 - Ιουλιανός ο παραβάτης - libretto by the composer, comprehending two poems of Konstantinos Kavafis.
- 2005 - Εμβατήριο Μαγιακόφσκι - libretto by the composer, comprehending a poem of Vladimir Majakovskij.

=== Operas ===
- 1986 - Οι δαιμονισμένοι, based on the novel Demons by Fyodor Dostoyevsky. - libretto by Alexandros Adamopoulos. Opera in three acts for symphonic orchestra, 21 soloist and choir.
- 1997 - Η δίκη, based on the novel The Trial by Franz Kafka. Libretto by the composer. Opera in three acts for soloist, choir and orchestra.
- 2000 - Αλκιβιάδης, based on the Alcibiades. Libretto by the composer. Opera in three acts for 23 soloists, choir and symphonic orchestra.
- 2003 - Ρέκβιεμ Αχμάτοβα, with poems of Anna Akhmatova and X. Vlavianou. Libretto by the composer. Opera for soprano, baritone, clarinet, horn, piano and strings.
- 2007 - Η Γυναίκα της Ζάκυθος, with text of D. Solomou. One act pocket opera for baritone, mezzo-soprano, violin, clarinet, cello and piano.
- 2008 - Ιδανικοί αυτόχειρες, libretto by the composer. One act pocket opera in three acts for 14 soloists and chamber orchestra.
- 2011 - Το ατύχημα, libretto by the composer. One act pocket opera for soprano, baritone, clarinet, cello and piano.
- 2011 - Η καριέρα, libretto by the composer. One act pocket opera for soprano, baritone, clarinet, cello and piano.
- 2012 - Η παγίδα, libretto by the composer. One act pocket opera for soprano, tenor, clarinet, cello and piano.
- 2013 - Η Μεταμόρφωση, based on the novel The Metamorphosis by Franz Kafka. Libretto by the composer. Opera for 6 soloists, oboe, clarinet, bassoon and piano.
- 2015 - H Επέτειος, libretto by the composer. Opera in two acts for soprano, baritone, clarinet, cello and piano.
- 2016 - O Εραστής, based on the play The Lover by Harold Pinter. Libretto by the composer. Opera for soprano, baritone, oboe, clarinet, bassoon, cello and piano.

=== Ballet ===
- 1983 - Never Return - music in nine parts, for flute (piccolo) and two percussionists.
- 1988 - Σφιγξ (The Sphynx), story based on the myth of Oedipus, for mezzo soprano - later sung by Ioanna Sfekas-Karvelas.
- 1993 - Το πηγάδι της αυγής - in four parts, for voice, flute, clarinet and piano.

=== Electronic mixes ===
- 1969 - Αυτοκτονίες
- 1974 - Πρό-θεσις
- 1976 - Περιμένοντας τους βαρβάρους
- 1977 - Μονόλογος Ι
- 1988 - Σφιγξ - work based on the myth of Oedipus.

=== Vocals ===
- 1976 - Δύο τραγούδια, based on a poem of Konstantinos Kavafis. Work for mezzo-soprano, tube and piano.
- 1978 - Τέσσερα τραγούδια, for voice and chamber orchestra.
- 1984 - Wall Street , work for mezzo-soprano and chamber orchestra. Based on the poem Lament of the Frontier Guard by Ezra Pound.
- 1989 - Εξομολόγηση, from the opera Οι δαιμονισμένοι - aria for baritone and chamber orchestra.
- 1992 - Serenity, based on Four Quartets by T. S. Eliot. Work for soprano and quintet (flute, oboe, horn, harp and cello).
- 1993 - Marina, based on Ariel Poems by T. S. Eliot. For soprano and orchestra.
- 1995 - Απολείπειν ο Θεός Αντώνιον, work for soprano, oboe, clarinet, cello and piano.
- 1995 - Τέσσερα τραγούδια, with poems of Christos Laskaris. Work for mezzo-soprano and cello.
- 1996 - Συναυλία, with poems of Takis Pavlostathis. Work for soprano, oboe, clarinet, horn, piano and string quartet.
- 1997 - Τρία ελληνικά τραγούδια, work for soprano, clarinet and harp.
- 1999 - Le cimetière marin, based on the same titled work of Paul Valéry. Work for soprano and string orchestra.
- 2001 - Le Jeune Parque, based on the same titled work of Paul Valéry. Work for soprano and piano.
- 2004 - Τέσσερα τραγούδια, with poems of Takis Pavlostathis. Work for soprano, cello and piano.
- 2004 - Δύο τραγούδια, with poems of Nikos Karouzos. Work for soprano, cello and piano.
- 2006 - Φυσάει, work for soprano and piano.
- 2009 - Του θηρίου, work for voice, clarinet, violin, cello and piano.
- 2009 - Ο στρατιώτης ποιητής, work for voice, clarinet and piano.
- 2010 - ΄Ενα κορμί στο διαμέρισμα, work for soprano, clarinet and piano.
- 2012 - ΄Ενα τραγούδι σε ποίηση Σαπφώς, work for soprano, flute, cello and piano.

=== Orchestra ===
- 1974 - Σπουδή για έγχορδα - Étude for Strings.
- 1976 - Τετράδιο, για ορχήστρα δωματίου.
- 1982 - Πρώτη Συμφωνία, για ορχήστρα - 1st Symphony.
- 1985 - Μαύρη μουσική (Black Music for Voice and Orchestra) - later also sung by Ioanna Sfekas-Karvelas.
- 1986 - Δεύτερη Συμφωνία, για ορχήστρα - 2nd Symphony
- 1992 - Δυτικά, για ορχήστρα
- 1996 - Διπλό κοντσέρτο, για βιόλα, βιολοντσέλο και ορχήστρα - Double Concerto for viola and cello.
- 2003 - Μονόλογος, για ορχήστρα εγχόρδων - Monologue, for string quartet.
- 2007/2009 - Κοντσέρτο για πιάνο και ορχήστρα - Piano concerto.

=== Chamber music ===
- 1981 - Θηραϊκή γη - για βιολοντσέλο και πιάνο
- 1983 - Συμφωνική σπουδή, για όμποε, τούμπα ( ή βιολοντσέλο ) και πιάνο
- 1993 - Σερενάτα - για κλαρινέτο και κουαρτέτο εγχόρδων (Serenade for clarinet and string quartet).
- 1995 - Τρίο, για βιολί, βιολοντσέλο και πιάνο - Piano Trio.
- 1995 - Κουαρτέτο, για φλάουτο, κλαρινέτο, βιολοντσέλο και πιάνο - Quartet for flute, clarinet, cello and piano.
- 1999 - Κουαρτέτο εγχόρδων, σε τρία μέρη - String quartet.
- 2000 - Οι ποιητές τώρα φεύγουν - για βιολοντσέλο και πιάνο

=== Solo works ===
- 1981 - Άλμπουμ, δεκαπέντε μικρά κομμάτια για τούμπα - Album, fifteen small pieces for tuba.
- 1981/1985 - Μονόλογος Ι, για κόρνο - Monologue I for French horn.
- 1994 - Σουίτα αρ. 1 - Suite for solo cello No. 1.
- 1994 - Σουίτα αρ. 2 - Suite for solo cello No. 2.
- 1995 - Μονόλογος ΙΙ, για κλαρινέτο - Monologue II for clarinet.
- 1998 - Σπουδή για πιάνο - Piano étude
- 1998 - Νυχτερινή άσκηση, για πιάνο

=== Music for theatre, cinema and television ===
- 1978 - Οι γυναίκες σήμερα, documentary (Popi Alkouli)
- 1981 - Επικίνδυνο παιχνίδι, later known as Anametrisi, film (Giorgos Karypidis)
- 1987 - Το καλοκαίρι της Μήδειας, film (Mpampis Plaitakis)
- 1987 - Ιωάννης Ζαμπέλιος, radio show (Giorgos Xatzidakis)
- 1988 - Τα πρόσωπα της Μαγδαληνής, TV show (Kostas Xronopoulos)
- 1996 - Los títeres de Cachiporra, play based on the work of Federico Garcia Lorca.

== Books ==
- 1982 - Diabolus in Musica (Gutenberg, Αthina)
- 1997 - Χαμηλή γη (Nefeli)
- 1999 - Για τον Νίκο Σκαλκώτα (Nefeli)
- 2005 - Μετρονόμος για μικρές και μεγάλες αρρυθμίες (Nefeli)
- 2013 - Ιδανικοί αυτόχειρες (Panas music, edition including 2 CD with the original compositions of the opera)
