= Diagoras =

Diagoras may refer to:

== Given name ==
- Diagoras of Melos – an Atheist philosopher and poet (5th century BC)
- Diagoras of Rhodes – a boxer (5th century BC)
- Diagoras – a Greek physician quoted in Natural History of Pliny
- Diagoras Chronopoulos (1939-2015) was a Greek actor, director, cultural manager, producer, and acting teacher

== Fictional characters ==
- Mr Diagoras, a character from the British science fiction series Doctor Who who became the human part of Dalek Sec, a Dalek-human hybrid
- Doctor Diagoras, one of the mad scientists of Stanisław Lem

== Sports ==
- P.A.E. G.S. Diagoras – football club named after Diagoras of Rhodes
- Diagoras Stadium, Rhodes
- Diagoras Dryopideon Aigaleo B.C.
- Diagoras Vrachnaiika F.C.
- Diagoras Agia Paraskevi F.C.
- Diagoras Sevasti F.C.

== Other ==
- Rhodes International Airport, "Diagoras"
- Diagoras ephialtes - a species of stick insect in the subfamily Platycraninae
- Diagoras a ferry of the Greek company Blue Star Ferries
