= Kosmos 93.6 =

Kosmos Radio
- Greece
- Frequencies: Athens: 93.6 & 107 MHz; Arcadia: 105.7 MHz; Drama: 102.5 MHz; Argolis: 94 MHz
- Branding: Kosmos 93.6 and 107

Programming
- Language: Greek
- Format: Jazz & World music

Ownership
- Owner: ERT
- Sister stations: First, Second & Third Programme

History
- First air date: 2001 (original); 11 June 2015 (relaunch)

Links
- Website: www.ertecho.gr/radio/kosmos

Kosmos 93.6 is a radio station of ERT founded in 2001 and its program focuses on selected international and ethnic repertoire (jazz, soul, hip hop, Afro, Latin, reggae etc.). In collaboration with the Ethnic Folk Network of the EBU, it broadcasts selected concerts from the global music scene and major international festivals.

== History ==
It began operating in 2001, after the redistribution of Athens frequencies, inspired by the then director of ERA, Antonis Andrikakis. Kosmos broadcast from the old frequency of Second Program, at 93.6 and from the old frequency of Radio Filia, at 107 MHz of FM. Its first director was Manos Tzanakakis and a year and a half after its founding, Giorgos Mouchtaridis took over until 2011. They were followed by Panos Chrysostomou, Yiannis Dimitriadis (NERIT period), Leonidas Antonopoulos, Joseph Vagger and again Leonidas Antonopoulos.

It is the first state-owned station that gave weight to world music, contributing to its rise. Although local in scope, it attracted an audience of around 5%, and became the most profitable radio station of the Hellenic Radio Broadcasting Corporation.

== Repertoire ==
Kosmos' core repertoire is world music, sounds and melodies that are not found on any other Greek radio station: Latin and Brazilian sounds, reggae and African, soul, jazz and classic rock, with touches of electronic production from Europe and America and the contemporary discography of "adult pop".

Since 2020, there have been tributes to genres and countries ("Mambo Estereo" with Vassilis Stamatiou), book shows (Thalia Karamolegou), tributes to decades and film music (Yiannis Petrides), shows with a journalistic perspective (Prokopis Doukas), selected new releases from around the world ("Fresh Unlimited" with Maria Markouli), "G-Poly Groove" with Georgos Polychroniou, "Kosmonaut" with Manolis Famellos, as well as mixsets by Greek and international DJs and producers (Kosmos LAB).

== Other activities ==
Kosmos has organized two music festivals of the same name, in 2009 at the Goudi Equestrian Club and in 2010 at the Petras Theater, with guest bands from its repertoire: The Specials, Dub INC, Amparo Sanchez, Shantel, Ojos de Brujo, Tinariwen, Solomon Bourque, Bajofondo, Orishas, Sophie de Lila, Yasmin Levi, Nicolas Conte, Burger Project, Stuff Benda Bilii. The station has also released five double CD collections with songs it broadcast in the first period of its operation. At the annual parties that the station has organized since 2017, Greek artists and bands such as Marina Satti, Jerome Kalouta, Indra Kane, Afrodyssey, etc. have appeared.

== Operation on NERIT ==
In June 2014, a year after the closure of ERT, its successor announced that the station would return to the same frequency and to others, initially in Athens and Thessaloniki, aiming to gain nationwide reach.
