= Anametrisi =

1982 film

- Directed by: Giorgos Karypidis
- Written by: Giorgos Karypidis; Vangelis Goufas
- Produced by: Giorgos Karypidis
- Starring: Zoi Laskari; Aris Retsos; Stefanos Stratigos; Spyros Fokas; Giorgos Sabanis; Nikolas Anagnostakis; Thomas Halvatzis; Panos Iliopoulos; Paris Katsivelos; Dina Konsta; Marika Nezer; Manos Tsilimidis; Ioulia Vatikioti; Filippos Vlachos
- Music by: Haris Vrondos
- Release date: 1982
- Running time: 110 minutes
- Country: Greece
- Language: Greek

Anametrisi (Greek: Αναμέτρηση, romanized: Anamétrisi, Unmeasured, also under the name Dangerous Game (Greek: Επικίνδυνο Παιχνίδι, romanized: Epikindino Pehnidi)) is a 1982 Greek mystery film directed by Giorgos Karypidis and starring Zoi Laskari, Aris Retsos, Stefanos Stratigos and Spyros Fokas.

== Cast ==
- Zoi Laskari ..... Anna Parisi
- Aris Retsos ..... Konstantinos Mavros
- Stefanos Stratigos ..... police officer
- Spyros Fokas ..... Petros Parisis
- Giorgos Sabanis
- Nikolas Anagnostakis
- Thomas Chalvatzis
- Panos Iliopoulos
- Paris Katsivelos
- Dina Konsta ..... woman in black
- Marika Nezer ..... aunt
- Manos Tsilimidis
- Ioulia Vatikioti ..... girl at the door
- Filippos Vlachos

== Awards ==
- EKKA Awards for Best Longest Film at the 1982 Thessaloniki Film Festival.
