= Trito Programma Vrahea =

Radio station operated by the Hellenic Broadcasting Corporation

Trito Programma Vrahea, which translates to 'Third Programme (of the Macedonian Radio Station) - Shortwave' was a radio station operated by the Hellenic Broadcasting Corporation (ERT). Founded in 1993, the station served as ERT 3's international short-wave service. The station was broadcast from ERT transmitters in Thessaloniki.

Some of the topics on the program included cultural broadcasts and news. It did not have the same programmes as the similarly named Third Programme.

On June 11, 2013 after the closure of ERT, Third Programme ceased broadcasts.
