= Diagoras Chronopoulos =

Diagoras Chronopoulos (1939–2015) was a Greek actor, director, cultural manager, producer, and acting teacher, recognized as one of the most significant artistic personalities of his generation.

He was born in Jerusalem, where his father served as a philologist, and returned to Greece with his family in 1948.

Chronopoulos studied Law at the National and Kapodistrian University of Athens and concurrently attended the Drama School of the "Art Theater" founded by Karolos Koun. In 1965, he moved to Paris, where he worked at the Théâtre populaire. From the early 1966 until 1971, he was in charge of the visual and auditory media department of ADEL S.A. advertising company.

Later in his career, Chronopoulos focused on producing films, documentaries, television series, and commercials for Greek television and cinema. He was arrested and imprisoned for his resistance activities against the regime of the colonels during the military dictatorship in Greece.

Chronopoulos held numerous public positions, such as the president of the Greek Directors' Society, the president of the Greek Advertising Film Producers Association, a board member of ERT S.A., and the director of Television of ET1. He also served as the General Secretary and the Deputy Artistic Director of the National Theater of Greece and as the artistic director of the National Theatre of Northern Greece.

As an actor, Chronopoulos appeared in several productions of the "Theatre of Art" and collaborated with various private theatrical troupes, also participating in Greek cinema. He was married twice, first to Eleni Mavili – Fotopoulou, with whom he had two children, and later to the actress and politician Eleni Kourkoula.

Diagoras Chronopoulos died on March 11, 2015, after a battle with cancer, at the age of 76.
