= Ioanna Sfekas-Karvelas =

Greek American dramatic soprano (born 1950)

Ioanna (Joan) Sfekas-Karvelas (Greek: Ιωάννα Σφήκα-Καρβέλα; born 1950) is a Greek American dramatic soprano who has sung leading roles in both the United States and Europe. She is the founder and Director of Opera Lesvos which she established in 2000.

Karvelas as Sappho

== Biography ==
Karvelas was born and raised in Baltimore, Maryland, USA. She studied voice under Antony Kalaitzakis, a tenor who was a student of the vecchia scuola tenor Nino Piccaluga (who was a contemporary of Giovanni Martinelli and who was often chosen by Toscanini to open the season of La Scala). She has studied with Conrad Osborne in New York and with the renowned dramatic mezzo-soprano, Edna Garabedian, with whom Karvelas has served as assistant of her Artist Agency in Bonn, Germany. She has also studied repertory and performed with the late William Yannuzzi, Music Director of the Baltimore Opera Company.

While teaching at the National Conservatory of Athens whose Directrix was Krino Kalomiris, daughter of Manolis Kalomiris, the head of the National School of Composers of Greece, she was chosen to record her interpretation of the role of the mother in Kalomiris's opera, The Mother's Ring. This recording bears the distinction of being the first Greek Opera ever recorded in a digital format. It was recorded in 1983 with the Sofia Philharmonic and the voices of the Obretenov Chorus in Sofia, Bulgaria.

Since then Karvelas has come to be known as the ambassador of Greek classical music, always performing along with her theatre engagements concerts which present a wealth of compositions of Greek composers, beginning with the Kennedy Center in Washington, D.C., Lincoln Center in New York City as well as in Germany, Austria, Poland, Bulgaria and Ukraine. In 2009 she starred in "A Celebration of Greek Music" presented at Sanders Theatre at Harvard University. She specializes in the dramatic roles of Verdi, such as Lady Macbeth, which she has recorded in Poland with the Polish National Radio Orchestra, with Maestro William Yannuzzi conducting, the roles of Abigaille (Nabucco), Elisabetta (Don Carlos), Leonora (Trovatore and Forza del destino), Puccini's Turandot and Tosca, and the Wagnerian heroines.

Considered by her colleagues a Master Trainer, she has been invited by many institutions to hold master classes on vocal technique and interpretation of standard operatic repertory and to perform rarely performed song cycles such as Berlioz's "Nuits d'Ete," Wagner's "Wesendonck Lieder," Richard Strauss's "Vier letzte Lieder," Kalomiris's "Magic Herbs," etc.

Karvelas, who resides on the island of Lesvos, Greece, is the Director of "Opera Lesvos" which she established in 2000, a truly pioneering venture for a Greek province. In her research into the history of opera, she unearthed a long forgotten libretto used by Verdi as an alternative libretto to "Giovanna d'Arco", an opera he wrote in 1845 but which he could not present before the Pope in Rome. Verdi and his librettist, Solera, substituted the true story of a Lesbiot heroine who donned male armor and saved the castle of Lesvos from the Ottoman invaders in 1450. The name of the opera was "Orietta di Lesbo." This libretto had not been used since 1850. Thus on 12 March 2006, the World Premier Revival of this work in its entirety took place in Portland, Oregon, with the Oregon Symphony and Chorus of Lewis and Clark College (who funded the project), with Karvelas in the lead role of Orietta.

Later that summer, the European Premier took place on the island of Lesvos, as part of the "Aegean Verdi Festival" with an international orchestra of instrumentalists from all over the world (Karvelas as Orietta and "Opera Lesvos" soloists participating with the international cast). To her educational and performing institute, she invites professional artists from all over the world to perform along with the local talent which she prepares and trains.

Karvelas has again combined forces with Garabedian who is Director of the California Opera Association in Fresno, California, serving as Artistic Advisor and Historian, giving master classes and lectures on the history of opera and great opera singers of the past and present. In 2010, they were planning performances of Stravinsky's "Oedipus Rex" with Karvelas as Jocasta.

Karvelas has been "Artist in Residence" of the University of Indianapolis - Athens Campus, since 2005, always serving her art as educator and performer.

== Discography and recordings ==
- E.R.T. (Hellenic National Radio and Television Broadcasting) Archival Recordings of Greek Composers both with piano and the National Radio Orchestra.
- Manolis Kalomiris's "The Mother's Ring", Lyra Recordings, international circulation, role of Mother, with Sophia Philharmonic Orchestra, Obretenov Chorus, Daras conducting. A historical recording since it was the first Greek opera ever recorded digitally. Vinyl 1983, later CD reissues.
- Manolis Kalomiris "Songs for Voice and Piano" Concert Athens, 1984, later reissues.
- Verdi's "Macbeth", Polish National Radio Symphony Orchestra, Apollo Records, Maestro William Yanuzzi, Baltimore Opera Musical Director conducting, Karvelas, Kouloumbis, Raptis.
- Haris Vrondos, "Black Music for Voice and Orchestra", Lyra Records.
- Haris Vrondos, "The Sphinx" for voice and orchestra, Lyra Records.
- Manolis Kalomiris, "A Few Little Words", (Kapoia Logakia), for voice, harp and clarinet, Lyra Records.
- Kyklos Mousikis, The Hellenic and Near-Eastern Musical Society Ensemble, New Hampshire: Theodorakis, Hatzidakis, etc., songs With orchestra.

== Sources ==
- Munro, Donald. "Ioanna Karvelas". The Fresno Bee.
- "The Aegean Verdi Festival in Mytilene, Lesvos: June 19th--July 2nd, 2006". Hellenic Communication Service, L.L.C. 30 July 2006.
- Sfekas-Karvelas, Ioanna (2006). "Forgotten Verdi Opera Unites U.S. and Greece". Hellenic Communication Service, L.L.C.
- "Music Department" (PDF). The Newsletter. 11 (46). University of Indianapolis, Athens Campus: 6. October–December 2006. Archived from the original (PDF) on 4 March 2012.
- Nixon, Diane (31 July 2008). "Cal Opera Finale Weekend". Fresno Arts. Archived from the original on 21 July 2011.
- Nixon, Diane (2 August 2005). "CALIFORNIA OPERA - FINALE PERFORMANCE TODAY!". MindHub. Archived from the original on 27 July 2011.
- "Artist Profile: Ioanna Sfekas Karvelas--Soprano". ArtistNation.org. 2009.
- "Celebration of Greek Music: Featured Performers". Greek Orthodox Metropolis of Boston. 21 November 2009. Archived from the original on 14 May 2010.
- "Verdi's Orietta". Lewis and Clarke College. 12 March 2005. Archived from the original on 1 June 2010.
- "Kalomiris song cycle featured in recital: Soprano Ioanna Sfekas-Karvelas performance includes "The Magic Herbs"". Lewis and Clarke College. 12 April 2005. Archived from the original on 18 July 2011.
- "Kalomiris song cycle featured in recital: Soprano Ioanna Sfekas-Karvelas performance includes "The Magic Herbs"". Lewis and Clarke College. 12 April 2005. Archived from the original on 18 July 2011.
- "Skipworth directs rarely heard Verdi opera: "Orietta di Lesbo"—unheard since the 1850s—featured in concert performance". Lewis and Clarke College. 5 March 2006. Archived from the original on 18 July 2011.
