= Prokopis Doukas =

Greek journalist and newscaster

Prokopis Doukas is a Greek journalist and newscaster.

Born in Athens, Greece in 1963, he studied electrical engineering (M. Sc. in electronics, telecommunications and networks) at the University of Patras, Greece and music technology at the Center for Computer Research in Music and Acoustics (CCRMA), Stanford University, CA. as a visiting scholar. His career as a DJ and journalist started with the "burst" of independent radio in Greece, in 1988. He has collaborated with major music and news stations in Athens, such as Sky 100.4, Antenna 97.1, Jazz FM, Athina 9.84, Net 105.8, and Kosmos 93.6.

In 1997, he was appointed as one of the principal anchors at the Greek state television. He has been presenting the night news since 1999, in both public broadcasting channels, ET1 and New Hellenic Television (NET), where he was replaced by Maria Houkli in 2001.

Since 2003, he has been one of the senior political commentators for the "Athens Voice", the largest free-press weekly newspaper in Greece. He has also collaborated, as a freelancer, with numerous newspapers and magazines, such as "Epsilon" of the "Eleftherotypia" daily, "Metro" and "Metarithmisi". Since 1991, he has been teaching young journalists, at various schools, such as Antenna Journalism School, Athens Media Lab and IEK Akmi.

He has also taken part in two films by Greek director Nikos Grammatikos, "Apontes" and "O Vassilias".
