= Second Programme =

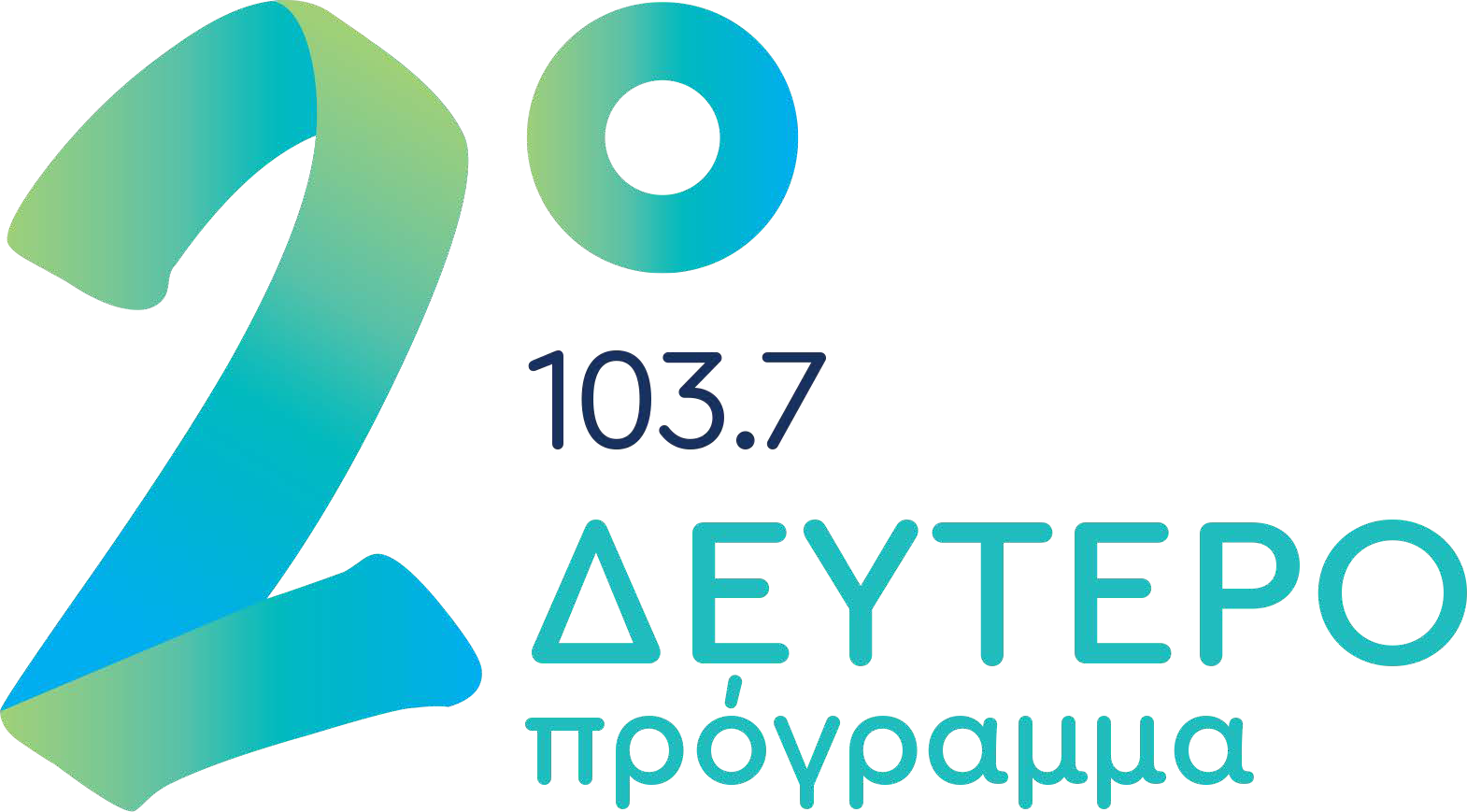

Greece
- Broadcast area: Greece: FM, DAB; Worldwide: Internet Radio
- Frequencies: Athens: 103.7 & 102.9 MHz; Thessaloniki: 90 MHz all over Greece

Programming
- Language: Greek
- Format: Greek music & culture of the public broadcasting

Ownership
- Owner: ERT
- Sister stations: First Programme; Third Programme; ERA Sport

History
- First air date: 11 May 1952; 73 years ago

Links
- Website: Second Programme

Second Programme (Greek: Δεύτερο Πρόγραμμα, Deftero Programma) is the second public radio station of Greece's state broadcaster, ERT. The station consists of Greek music and culture broadcasts.

== History ==
The Second Programme originated on May 11, 1952 as a result of an attempt at an alternative music and entertainment program, to the First Programme. It was originally broadcast on 666 kHz, later on 93.6 MHz FM, and still later carried on Kosmos 93.6. The station program focused, from the outset, on Greek music but also on theatre performances. In 1987 it was renamed ERA 2. Ten years later, in 1997, it returned to the old name.

The second program, due to nationwide broadcast, was the top in ratings for musical radio in the region. Every year the station broadcasts live the Eurovision Song Contest, in cooperation with ERT1, which carries it on television.

=== After ERT ===
On June 11, 2013, after the government's decision Samara for the closure of ERT, the Second Program stopped functioning. From then until November 7 of the same year the station broadcast 4 hours to 24 hours from a single network of HR operated by redundant workers from ERT. On Monday 16 December the same year the Second Programme reopened ERT Open.

A year later, Monday, December 15, 2014, the Second Program started operating under the New Greek Radio, Internet and TV, the new operator of Greece that existed.

=== Back to ERT ===
On April 28, 2015 it was passed by law from the Parliament to reopen ERT, which took place on June 11, 2015, two years after the black ERT and its replacement of NERIT. Specifically, NERIT was closed and ERT reopened with all the radio stations including the Second Programme. So, on the day of relaunch, the station transmitted the ERT and the HR again.
