= 95.8 FM =

FM radio frequency

The following radio stations broadcast on FM frequency 95.8 MHz:

== China (mainland) ==
- CNR The Voice of China in Nanjing, Sanming and Shenzhen

== Germany ==
- RBB Radioeins in Berlin, Brandenburg
- WDR 5 in Ederkopf, North Rhine-Westphalia
- NDR 1 in Aurich, Lower Saxony

== Hong Kong ==
- Transfer CNR The Voice of China

== Hungary ==
- Sláger FM in Budapest

== Indonesia ==
- Prambors FM in DI Yogyakarta

== Israel ==
- Radio Darom in the Negev

== Italy ==
- M2o in Rome, Lazio

== Malaysia ==
- Fly FM in Klang Valley

== New Zealand ==
- Flava in Auckland

== Singapore ==
- Capital 95.8FM

== United Kingdom ==
- BBC Radio Devon in Exeter
- BBC Radio Gloucestershire in Cirencester
- BBC Radio Merseyside in Liverpool
- BBC Radio Tees in Whitby
- BBC Radio 4 in Glasgow, Scotland
- Capital London in London

== Zimbabwe ==
- 95.8 Central Radio in Gweru
