= First Programme =

Greek national radio station

ERTNews Radio
- Athens; Greece
- Broadcast area: Greece
- Frequencies: Athens: 105.8 & 91.6 MHz; Thessaloniki: 88 MHz all over Greece

Programming
- Language: Greek
- Format: News

Ownership
- Owner: Hellenic Broadcasting Corporation
- Sister stations: Second Programme; Third Programme; ERA Sport

History
- First air date: 30 September 1938; 88 years ago

Links
- Website: www.ertecho.gr/radio/ertnewsradio/

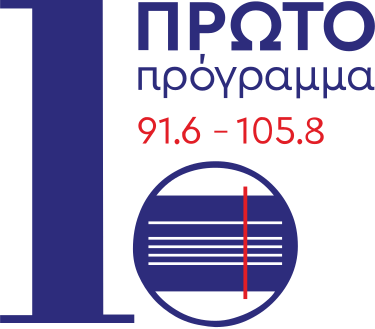
Old logo (2021–2025)

ERTNews Radio is the first Greek public radio station, first broadcast by the National Radio Foundation and later Hellenic Broadcasting Corporation.

== 1938 ==
Founded in 1938 as Athens Radio Station from a studio in Zappeion, with transponders in Ano Liosia and the musical branding "Tsopanakos" (I was a shepherd) by clarinetist Nikos Rellia, from Goura, Corinthia.

== 1945 ==
When Germany invaded, it stopped transmitting, returning in 1945 with a new name, as EIR. The station mainly broadcast music with news in between. Since it began, the station has had a significant presence in theatre, with the participation of important artists such as Alexis Solomos and Karolos Koun. In the theatre of Sartre in 1951 Manos Hadjidakis made his radio debut, writing music of investment.

== 1952 ==
In 1952, modernisation of the radio station took place to stand out from the newly created Second Programme.

== 1978 ==
In 1978, the EIRT was reorganised into a public limited company and renamed Hellenic Broadcasting Corporation and the first program continued to operate under the new entity.

The station was founded under the name "First Program" in 1978. It was the first program that operated as public radio. The Hellenic Broadcasting Corporation (ERT) was reorganised as a public limited company. The station continued operating as part of the new entity.

== 1987 ==
In 1987 due to the restructuring of the Hellenic Radio, programs were renamed to ERA 1.

== 1997 ==
In 1997, during another reorganisation and consolidation of the television network, NET (formerly ET2) again changed its name to NET 105.8, which later became "First Program" with news. The station got into the information radio market and had great success. In 1997, under a new reorganisation and consolidation of the NET they changed once again to NET 105.8, which later became NET FM.

== 2012 ==
In December 2012, it returned to its former name, but kept its programming.

== 2013 ==
On June 11, 2013, the government decided to close the ERT. However, after ERT closed, the ERA 1 and some other stations owned by ERT still remain online, controlled by then-former ERT employees via ERT Open. The name "First Program" continues to be used by the first radio station under the new state broadcaster, NERIT.

== 2015 ==
On June 11, 2015, the First Programme was reopened.

== 2025 ==
On September 15, 2025, the First Programme was renamed ERT News Radio as a consolidation with the thematic news television channel of the same name.

== Petridis and Zougris ==
Giannis Petridis and Kostas Zougris had a radio show, 1974–2012, for 38 years. Then Kostas Zougris retired and then Giannis Petridis continued his show on Vima FM 99,5. As of July 24, 2017, Giannis Petridis returned to the ERTNews Radio, but this time, he's hosting the show himself.
