= National Broadcasting Television (Greece) =

Greek state broadcaster, 1970-1975

EIRΤ
- Country: Greece

Programming
- Language(s): Greek

History
- Launched: 30 September 1970
- Closed: 1975
- Replaced by: ERT

National Broadcast Television (EIRT) was the Greek state broadcaster founded in 1970 during the junta. In 1975, EIRT was replaced by the Hellenic Broadcasting Corporation.

== History ==
The EIRT was the fourth state body renovation of Greece and the first state TV operator in Greece. The first body renovation of Greece was the DPE (Service Radio Broadcast) with the PLA (Radio Athens) established by the Augustinian Diktaktoria Metaxas, 1938.

The second operator was AERE (sa Radio Broadcasting) and again the PLA established the Occupation. In 1946, they founded the National Broadcasting Corporation by virtue of the Constituent Act 54/1945 "establishing the National Radio Foundation" whereby and brought to the ownership of all property of the former A.E.R.E., which had been created in possession.

== Establishment ==
On 21 April 1967 the military junta and assumed command of EIR and YENED (formerly LDC). Georgios Papadopoulos wanted to create a second public broadcaster, to strengthen the propaganda of the dictatorship. In 1970, the Papadopoulos government Junta establishes the National Radio Television Institute in the most permanent television station of former EIR and radio stations First, Second and Third Programme.

== Role ==
The role of EIRT was broadcast nationwide information and entertain the Greek people. In fact, the EIRT was an instrument of the junta to get in the part of the Greek people, not controlled by the military but by the Greek people during the junta.

== Headquarters ==
The station initially broadcast from its studios in the Zappeion, but they were insufficient and they moved to the current headquarters of ERT, Broadcasting House in Northeastern Athens.

The year prior to its closure in 1975, Broadcasting House in Northeastern Athens was inaugurated in 1974 to house EIRT. It was constructed from 1968 to 1969, and housed the new station. Prior to its inauguration in 1974, it broadcast from the Mourouzi Studios in 1968.

== After the Junta, closure and successor ==
After the fall of the junta, the EIRT legalized and showed the fall of the junta and the return of Constantine Karamanlis. In 1975, it was succeeded by the newly created state broadcaster ERT.
