= Voice of Greece =

International radio service from ERA Greece

ERA 5 - The Voice of Greece
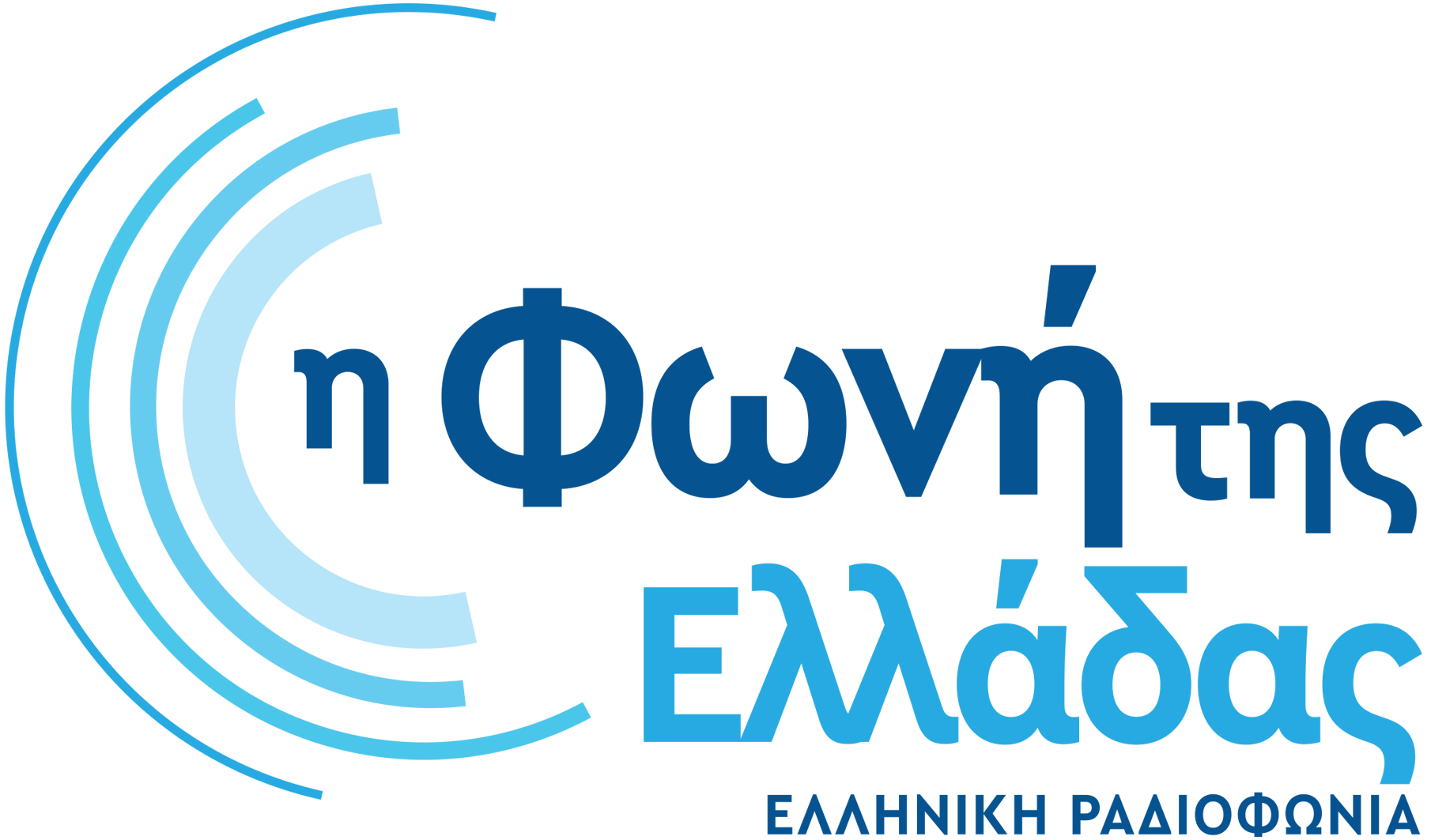
- Greece

Ownership
- Owner: Hellenic Broadcasting Corporation

History
- First air date: 1938; 88 years ago
- Former names: ERA 5

Links
- Website: Official website

The Voice of Greece (Greek: Η Φωνή της Ελλάδας), also known as ERA 5, is the international service of Greek state radio on shortwave and via satellite and the internet. On 11 June 2013, the Greek government announced the closure of the state broadcaster ERT from 12 June 2013 as an austerity measure.

As of 24 June 2013, The Voice of Greece was broadcasting intermittently again on shortwave on 9420 kHz, 9935 kHz, 11645 kHz, but the live online stream had not resumed. A live stream began operating again in mid-2015. and as of 31 March 2022, the broadcasting on Shortwave has stopped, while online streaming services are still in operation.

== History ==
The first state radio of Greece, Athens Radio, was inaugurated in spring 1938 with a 15 kW transmitter in the Liosia suburb and the studios of the Zappeion Mansion.

The first attempt for establishing a shortwave radio station took place immediately after the Greco-Italian War broke out in October 1940. Athens Radio programmes were transmitted from a small transmitter in the centre of Athens to the front and the Balkans. A special shortwave programme was created after the German-Italian occupation in 1947. Transmissions began from a 7.5 kW transmitter to Cyprus, Egypt, Turkey, the Balkans and the Soviet Union, while four transmissions were made to Greek navigators.

The daily news bulletins were broadcast in 12 foreign languages (Arabic, German, Russian, Spanish, Romanian, Turkish, Serbo-Croatian, Bulgarian, Albanian, French, Polish, and English) and once a week in Arabic. A music programme was also broadcast.

The shortwave transmission centre was established in 1972 with two 110 kW transmitters in Avlis, 37 kilometres (23 mi) northeast of Athens, with transmitting antennas directed to the inhabited continents.

After the collapse of the military junta in 1974, the shortwave programme was named "The Voice of Greece" and came under the then Radio News Management. Almost 15 years later, with the institutionalisation and implementation of the Unified ERT body, it became autonomous and was named "The Fifth Programme - The Voice of Greece", coming under the ERA General Management.

== Profile ==
ERA 5 transmitted on shortwave (9420 kHz, 9935 kHz and 11645 kHz) continually for 23 hours and at mediumwave for about 10 hours.

ERA 5 transmits 19 bulletins in Greek daily. The programme also includes informative programs of political, cultural and folklore interest, as well as musical programs that promote Greek songs. ERA 5 is mainly characterised by programs that bring it to direct contact with its listenership through telephone calls and letters.

ERA 5 is not only intended for Greeks living abroad, but also for foreigners living in Greece and abroad. It accomplishes this through a daily programme in many languages on shortwave and mediumwave.

This programme is transmitted in 12 languages: English, German, Spanish, Russian, Polish, Albanian, Romanian, Serbo-Croatian, Turkish and Arabic.

== See also ==
- Hellenic Radio
- List of international radio broadcasters
