= Third Programme (ERT) =

Greece
- Broadcast area: Greece: FM, DAB; Worldwide: Internet Radio
- Frequencies: Athens: 90.9 & 95.6 MHz; Thessaloniki: 92 MHz all over Greece

Programming
- Language: Greek
- Format: Classical music

Ownership
- Owner: ERT
- Sister stations: First Programme; Second Programme; ERA Sport

History
- First air date: 1954

Links
- Website: Third Programme

The Third Programme (Greek: Τρίτο Πρόγραμμα, Trito Programma) is the third public radio station of Greece's state broadcaster, ERT. The station's main program broadcasts are focused on classical music and culture. Since October 2018, the station is headed by Pantazis Tsaras.

== History ==
It aired on September 19, 1954, with the initiative of author Dionysios Romas, two years after the founding of the Second Program. In its first days, it utilized a neglected transmitter and aired only three hours a day (7 PM to 11 PM).

The station's success story, began after the fall of the dictatorship, during metapolitefsi, when Manos Hatzidakis, became the station's director.

Under Hatzidakis' tenure (1975–1982), the program attracted the interest of people of all ages, including children. The landmark children's series Εδώ Λιλιπούπολη (Liliput Speaking) was aired in 1976. It was initially considered a failure, because it was deemed too childish and as such failed to fit the 'serious' thematology of the station, oriented towards classical music. When the show became more theatrical, incorporating political parallelisms, it arose in popularity.

After the series' end in 1980, the station gradually stopped being in the spotlight. However, as it is the only nationwide radio station centered around classic music and culture, it retains a loyal audience.

Following the temporary closure of ERT on June 11, 2013, the Third Programme broadcast unofficially four hours a day in a unified EPA and, after 25 September of the same year was emitted through the unofficial ERT Open.

On March 10, 2014, the Third Programme reopened by Public Radio, a transitional entity, and from 4 May was broadcast from NERIT. After the reopening of ERT on June 11, 2015, the station was reinstated in EPA and stopped being broadcast by ERT Open.
