= ERA Sport =

Sports radio stadio of ERT

ERA Spor
- Greece
- Frequency: See list

Ownership
- Owner: Hellenic Broadcasting Corporation

Links
- Website: www.ertecho.gr/radio/eraspor

The ERA Sport (Greek: EΡA Σπορ, ERA Sport) is the sports radio station of ERT. The station broadcasts 24-hour sports programs. The programme also included political news.

ERA Sport has been among the leading sports radio stations in the country since its establishment. The station was closed on 11 June 2013 following a government decision, but two years later, on 11 June 2015, ERA Sport re-opened.

== History ==
ERA Sport was the successor of the station ERA4.

In 1982, the politicization was renamed ERT2 and in 1987 the merger of two state broadcasting operators, renamed Fourth Programme and later ERA 4 radically changed the profile, transmitting music and some sports broadcasts.

The idea of a purely sports radio broadcast was the idea of the journalist George Tzavellas, who, in collaboration with sports reporters Kostas Mochi and Hercules Kotzia, created the design and structure of the new station.

ERA Sport first aired on 3 May 1993. Almost the entire program was broadcast live, with microphones in stadiums and other sports events, in Greece and abroad.

It attracted the largest number of Athens listeners, reaching 8%, and in the region. ERA Sport became the "school" for Greek sports radio, with many significant shows (Third Eye, 12 and 1, Fight Club and many other shows).

On 11 June 2013 a Government decision closed ERT and stopped transmitting ERA Sport, but two years later, on 11 June 2015, ERA Sport re-opened, following the re-opening of ERT.

== Frequencies ==
- Aetolia-Acarnania: 97.3 MHz
- Arcadia: 95.3 MHz
- Argolis: 103.2 MHz & 106.6 MHz
- Athens: 100.9 MHz, 101.8 MHz & 981 ΚHz
- Boeotia: 107.4 MHz
- Cephalonia: 106.8 MHz
- Chania: 90.1 MHz
- Chios: 102.1 MHz
- Corfu: 101.1 MHz
- Corinth: 105.0 MHz
- Cyclades: 102.7 MHz
- Dodecanese: 101.4 MHz & 107.9 MHz
- Evros: 89.4 MHz & 107.3 MHz
- Grevena: 97.4 MHz
- Heraklion, Crete: 93.9 MHz
- Ioannina: 101.7 MHz & 102.1 MHz
- Kavala: 104.7 MHz & 107.3 MHz
- Kastoria: 105.1 MHz
- Kato Nevrokopi: 104.4 MHz
- Kozani: 105.6 MHz
- Laconia: 104.8 MHz
- Lasithi: 91.9 MHz
- Lesbos: 107.9 MHz
- Messenia: 100.4 MHz
- Patra: 87.9 MHz
- Phocis: 90.4 MHz & 94.5 MHz
- Samos: 106.8 MHz
- Serres: 87.6 MHz
- Thessaloniki: 93.9 MHz
- Thessaly: 107.1 MHz
- Xanthi: 101.1 MHz
