= Eon TV =

European pay television service

- Type: Broadcast
- Country: Bosnia and Herzegovina; Bulgaria; Croatia; Greece; Montenegro; Slovenia; Serbia
- Availability: International
- Owner: United Group
- Launch date: September 2017
- Official website: en.eon.tv

EON TV is a pay television service launched by United Group in September 2017 that is available in Southeast European countries, namely Bosnia and Herzegovina, Bulgaria, Croatia, Greece, Montenegro, Slovenia and Serbia. It is based on a Over-the-top media service infrastructure, where it is using internet to broadcast audio and video to the user's TV or mobile device.

== Greek channels list ==
Greek national FTA

- Vouli Tileorasi
- ERT1
- ERT2 Sport
- ERT3
- ERT News
- Alpha TV
- Star Channel
- Mega Channel
- Makedonia TV
- ANT1
- Skai TV
- Open TV

Greek regional FTA

- Action 24
- Attica TV
- Blue Sky
- One Channel
- Kontra Channel
- Naftemporiki
- CreteTV
- Ionian Channel
- Star Central Greece
- FORMedia Thessaly
- ENA Channel
- TV 100

Greek Fast Channels

- Mega News

Cinema & Series

- Nova Life
- Nova Cinema (4 channels)
- FX
- FX Life
- Viasat Epic Drama

Sports channels

- Novasports News
- Novasports Start
- Novasports Prime
- Novasports (6 channels)
- Novasports Premier League
- Novasports Extra (4 channels)
- Magenta Sport Highlights
- Magenta Sport (9 channels)
- Magenta Sport 4K
- Extreme Sports Channel
- Eurosport 1
- Eurosport 2
- Inplus/Insight TV

Documentary channels

- National Geographic
- National Geographic Wild
- Discovery Channel
- Animal Planet
- Viasat Nature
- Viasat Explore
- Viasat History
- Viasat True Crime
- Travel Channel International
- Crime & Investigation
- History
- CGTN Documentary

Lifestyle

- E!
- TLC
- My Zen TV
- Food Network
- Yachting TV
- FashionTV

Kids

- Disney Channel
- Disney Jr.
- IDJ Kids
- BabyTV
- Duck TV
- Smile TV
- Cartoonito
- Da Vinci TV

Music

- MAD TV
- MAD Greekz
- MAD Vibes
- MAD Rewind
- Marquee TV
- Number 1 TV
- Oh! Jazz

News

- ERT Cosmos
- RIK Sat
- CNN
- DW-TV
- TV5Monde
- France 24 (English and French)
- Al Jazeera Arabic
- Al Jazeera English
- Bloomberg TV Europe
- Euronews (Greek, English, Italian and Russian)
- CGTN
- Arirang TV
- FREEДОМ
- 1+1

Adult

- Blue Hustler (with no extra cost for full pack subscribers)
- Hustler TV (with extra cost)
- Private TV
- Vivid Red
- Brazzers
- Redlight

== See also ==
- United Group
- Wind Vision
