= Channel 9 (Greece) =

- Country: Greece
- Headquarters: Grava school complex, Athens

Programming
- Language: Greek

Ownership
- Owner: Channel Nine S.A.
- Sister channels: Action 24

History
- Launched: 1992
- Closed: 31 October 2022
- Replaced by: One Channel
- Former names: Tile Tora (1992-2000); Polis TV (2000-2005); TVC (2004-2005)

Links
- Website: www.channel9.gr

Availability

Terrestrial
- Digea: Channel 30 (Ymittos, Parnitha, Aegina, Oktonia, Prasino, Chalcis, Avlonas, Vari, Nea Stira, Laurium, Anavyssos, Sounion, Nea Makri, Darditsa)

Channel 9 (Greek: Κανάλι 9) was a Greek television channel broadcasting in the region of Attica. Despite being declared to be a news-based channel, the majority of the channel's programming since the early 2010s, has consisted of telemarketing.

== History ==
In 1992, the channel was launched as Tile Tora, founded by journalist Gregoris Michalopoulos. In January 2000, the channel was bought by Stathis Tsotsoros (Alpha TV) and was renamed POLIS TV or POLIS for short; a radio counterpart was established the same year. Michalopoulos became the channel's vice president. In 2004, the channel was renamed TV Cosmopolis or TVC for short. In 2005, the channel changed ownership again, and was temporarily renamed back to POLIS in preparation for an overhaul. On October 11, 2005, a fire almost completely ruined formerly sister station Alpha TV's studios in Agios Ioannis Rentis, where the regional station was housed anew, along with some archive material; the scheduled for the end of the month rebrand and new programming of the station were halted, with its already existing programming broadcasting from Alpha's headquarters in Kantza. In December 2005, the station was renamed to Channel 9, broadcasting from the studios in Rentis, after another deadline for December 5 was expired. The then new programming of the station, featuring primarily news bulletins, was undertaken by journalist Nikos Evangelatos, who was at the same time hosting the news program Apodeikseis on Alpha. It hasn't changed its main 4:3 idents since then. In 2010, the channel started focusing on economy shows, with Panagiotis Mpousmpourelis at the head.

Between 2004 and 2006, the channel was infamous for strikes by its crew and its executives firing employees. The channel would slowly start constantly airing replays of other shows, and there would be a potential shutdown of the station. At the end of 2006, journalist Nikos Evangelatos was forced to resign, following improper financial handling, firing all of the station's 390 employees. Since then, Channel 9 has gone through economic redevelopment, something that has managed to progress slowly into the new digital age.

In February 2007, Channel 9 started broadcasting live from its website. In December 2013, Channel 9 was added to Cosmote TV. It was removed from the service in November 2018.

=== Ownership ===
The channel has several times changed ownership in its history. The first company to operate the station was the Tiletora Anonymous Radio Television Company, which was established on February 6, 1992. A year later, the operation of the channel under the 19205/E license of local signal in Attica was legalized, and on March 20, 1998, the Ministry for the Press issued a decision, according to which, the channel was re-legalized as a regional one. Since its inception, the channel's headquarters would be initially located at Lycabettus St. 17 and later on Ilias Iliou St. 15, until mid-2001, when it was moved to Kallithea.

On June 30, 2000, the organization's statute was altered, by adding the purpose of producing films for the needs of the channel, and a few months later, due to a change of ownership, the name of the organization was changed to Polis Television S.A. Journalist Petros Diplas became its president. In mid-2004, the station was sold and the name of the previous operator of the station changed to Mediterranean Television Enterprises S.A., which shut down one year later. On May 25, 2004, Radio Television Operations Cosmopolis SA was established, as a conversion of the same-named joint venture and which took over again the television channel, purchased from Polis SA. By mid-2005, the major shareholder would appear to be Stathis Tsotsoros, president of the directors' board and chief executive on Alpha TV and Channel 9.

On October 3, 2005, the organization was last renamed as Channel Nine (9) S.A., and the station was transferred to Pavlou Melas St. 26 in Rentis. At the same time, it started to maintain a branch office at Kontonis St. 11–13, also in Agios Ioannis Rentis, where the former production offices of its sister channel, Alpha TV, were housed.

Until mid-2006, journalist Nikos Evangelatos held a significant share in the station. Behind the journalist was late businessman Dimitris Kontominas, and only because Greek law at the time did not allow individual ownership of more than one television channel and two radio stations. The law has since changed and Dimitris Kontominas is the majority shareholder.

In late 2010, the organization's statute was altered, with an expansion of activities, while two years later, the station's headquarters were transferred to the old facilities of Alpha TV in Paiania. At the end of 2020 the station moved to the facilities of Action 24 in the area of the Grava school complex.

The station was bought in September 2022 by Dionysis Panagiotakis, and at midnight on November 1 it was replaced by One Channel, with which its immediate predecessor had a collaboration, officially utilizing its informative license after many years.

== Programming ==
TV Cosmopolis logo.

Channel 9's programming originally was based on newscasts, original productions and cartoons. The channel had nine daily newscasts to match its name. As of 2010, the channel's news operations consisted of a daily economic zone, the main newscast, a sign language newscast, a sports newscast, and a newscast from Al Jazeera English translated into Greek from 2009 to 2013, a first for Greek television. Other programming would include children's series, foreign films from Village Roadshow and original productions, mainly medical ones. Until 2007 the majority of the channel's programming consisted of cartoons from Nickelodeon. Channel 9 has also aired sports events such as Bundesliga, Eredivisie, the Scotland Premier League, NBA, Serie A, Coupe de France and Skoda Foot Volley 2006, as well as programming from MTV Global and productions for its sister channel, Alpha TV, since its change of ownership in 2000 (such as TSA, I Kouzina tis Mamas and Oikogeneiakes Istories). Currently, almost all of its programming in the daytime consists of telemarketing.

Various local stations in Greece, including Star Central Greece in Lamia, NET TV in western Peloponnesus, the ORT in Peloponnesus, Kriti TV in Crete, Super B in western Greece, Delta TV in Thraki, Center TV in south Macedonia, Cosmos TV (later Channel 9 Thessaloniki defunct) and Dion TV in central Macedonia, In-Channel in Epirus, New TV in eastern Macedonia, Flash TV in western Macedonia and TV 10 in Thessaly, have aired a significant part of programming from Channel 9, as part of a project formerly known as POLIS Net. Polis Net Consultants, the company behind the project, was established on September 28, 2000. Stathis Tsotsoros, Vasilis Vasilogamvros and Petros Diplas have been its presidents in the past.

- Afilakti Diavasi – presented by Gregoris Michalopoulos. (1995)
- Polis Sports
- 60' stin Ellada
- 60' ston Planiti
- Thesi Euthinis
- Aksonikos Tomografos
- Apo Poli se Poli
- After
- Eutheos
- Euro Game (2003)
- Games An Gamers – show about videogames. (2003-2004)
- Antilogos – talk show. (2004)
- Quiz Game – game show; presented by Eleni Pitsia. (2004)
- Europuzzle – game show.
- PoliSHAKE – presented by Eleni Pitsia.
- To Iatreio tou Stadeiou – sports show. (2004)
- Iatriko Periskopio – medical show; presented by endocrinologist Spyros Paulou. (2004)
- Aroma Kouzinas (2004)
- Pame Tameio – sports show. (2004)
- Energoi Polites – show; various formats for businessmen/workers, young ones/women, local news, etc. (2004)
- Antistiksi (2004)
- 2004 + 6 – talk show.
- Auto Test
- Poleis kai Polites tis Europis
- Channel 9 Reports – show; various formats for mornings (presented by Nikos Aggelides and Maria Ntaliani), afternoons (Antonis Papadopoulos and Androniki Kolovou), and weekends. (2005-)
- Necessaire (2005-)
- C' est la vie – lifestyle show. (2005-)
- Oi Kalopsichoi – news satire. (2005-)
- To Kapheneio ton Philathlon – sports show; presented by Giorgos Georgiou. (2005-)
- Full 9 – game show that includes poker, darts and tables. The winner of a daily final would enter the final of the week and could win a car; cut after decision made by the National Council for Radio and Television.
- World Reports
- Martial Arts – presented by George Zantiotis.
- Talent Show – talent show; presented by Eleni Pitsia. (2006-)
- Art Market News – show regarding prices for paintings; presented by Lito Misiakouli. (2011)
- Auto Nine – show about automobiles and auto racing; presented by Takis Trakouselis. (2011-2013)
- Banking News – show about the stock market. (2011)
- Market Leader – documentary series about noteworthy people in the business industry. (2011)
- Shipping Report – show about business and shipping; presented by Natasa Spantidaki. (2011)
- O Kosmos tis Phorologias – show about taxing; presented by Natasa Spantidaki. (2011)
- Ta Nea tis Ygeias – medical show; presented by Aimilios Negkis. (2011)
- I Ora ton Apofaseon
- I Ora ton Agoron – show about the stock market; presented by Ilias Mbellos and Panagiotis Gkroumoutis. (2011)
- Zoom stin Oikonomia – show about economy; presented by Panagiotis Mbousmbrelis. (2011)
- Deltio Thiellis – news show; presented by Yannis Ntaska and Charis Mpotsaris. (2011-2012)
- Ston Palmo tou Chrimatos – show about economy in Greece; presented by Mairi Tzibeleka. (2011)
- Oikonomia Simera – news show about the stock market; presented by Anestis Ntokas. (2011)
- Ta Megala Asteria tou Podosfairou – documentary series about well-known footballers. (2011-2013)
- Megala Portraita – documentary series about well-known people. (2011-2013)
- Ora Asfalisis – show about health insurance. (2011)
- Protagonistes tis Oikonomias – news show about business economics; presented by Giorgos Dimitromanolakis. (2011)
- Echis Astro
- Tribute – documentary series about well-known people. (2012-)
- Pickup Stories – documentary series about music. (2012-)
- Doctors Live – medical show; presented by Asimina Tzatha. (2012-2018)
- Iatrikoi Dialogoi – medical show; presented by Lena Livanos. (2011-)
- Mistika Perasmata – show about paranormal events; presented by Evaggelos Beksis. (2012-)
- To Avrio tis Ygeias – medical show; presented by managing director Dimitra Gioti. (2010-)
- Choris Retous – talk show; presented by Natasa Kritikou.
- Spotlight – news show about the film industry.
- Tourism Today – show about tourism; presented by Nikos Ntigrintakis. (2011-)
- O Kaliteros mou Philos – show regarding taking care of a pet. (2013)
- DrList.gr – medical show; presented by Marilia Kouzou and Aimilia Gialia. (2013)
- Kritiki Phoni – news coverage in Crete, in co-operation with Flashnews.gr; presented by Vasilis Kasimatis. (2013-2014)
- I Ygeia mas Simera – medical show. (2013-2016)
- OUPS! – (2013)
- Happy Hour – commercial show. (2013)
- Sta Monopatia tis Alithias
- Iatrikoi Orizontes – medical show. (2013-)
- Ygeia & Diatrofi – show about health. (2014-)
- Moto & Bike TV – show about motorcycles and bicycles. (2014)
- Automania TV – show about cars with additional coverage about the Philpa Federation and the traffic police. (2014)
- Mathaino gia tin Ygeia mou – medical show; presented by Fotini Petroyanni. (2014-)
- Proeklogiko Vima – show about the 2014 local elections in Greece; presented by Dimitra Gioti. (2014)
- Dream Day – show about weddings and baptism. (2014-)
- Face to Face – medial show; presented by Asimina Tzatha. (2014-)
- Ellada Stasou Isia – presented by Aleksandros Aleksopoulos. (2014-)
- Pame Mpala – show about amateur football in Attiki and Piraeus; presented by Yannis Mauropoulos. (2014-)
- I Dinami ton Arithmon – show about numerology; presented by Maria Zoi. (2013-)
- Talk of the Town – presented by Eirini Laimou.
- Movieland – news show about the film industry.
- Astra En...taksi – astrological show; presented by Vasia Konti. (2015-)
- To Deltio Paremvasis – show about the 2015 legislative elections in Greece; presented by Yanna Papadakou and Petros Kousoulos. (2015)
- Empeiries Ygeias – medical show.
- Chromata Elladas
- Stars & Movies – news show about the film industry.
- Europe Flash News – news coverage and interviews from EuroparlTV.
- Magazino Greece – talk show; presented by Georgia Gariphalou. (2019-)

=== Nickelodeon ===
Channel 9 started airing Nickelodeon cartoons (in a block also known as Nick Toons; a first for free-to-air television in Greece), formerly known as the staples of the channel's programming, in late 2003, around one year after Alpha Digital, a digital satellite pay television platform by sister channel Alpha TV, was discontinued due to a low number of subscribers and financial problems. Alpha Kids was one of its premium channels, and would air throughout the entirety of its everyday schedule Nickelodeon shows (formerly aired on a block on Alpha Cinema 1). No new Nickelodeon shows were bought after its closure.

Initially, Nickelodeon bumpers from the 90's would air in-between commercial breaks, similarly to other counterparts of Nickelodeon, such as Russian version. In 2005, after the channel was rebranded to Channel 9, the idents in the block were changed to the ones used in the United States counterpart at that time, till early 2008, when the block was discontinued. Ants, Ants, Ants, a short about ants playing hula hoops in the ant hill, and Zoom, a short animated by the illustrator of the wordless book it is based on, Istvan Banyai, would also air during commercial breaks.

- SpongeBob SquarePants (seasons 1–3)
- Dora the Explorer (season 1)
- Rugrats (Ράγκρατς)
- CatDog
- Eureeka's Castle (Το Κάστρο της Γιουρίκα)
- Blue's Clues (Τα Στοιχεία της Μπλού)
- Legends of the Hidden Temple (Τα Μυστικά του Κρυμμένου Ναού)
- Aaahh!!! Real Monsters (Ακαδημία Τεράτων)
- Rocket Power (seasons 1–2)
- The Wild Thornberrys
- As Told by Ginger (Το Ημερολόγιο της Τζίντζερ)
- The Angry Beavers (Οι Τρελοκάστορες)
- Hey Arnold!
- The Adventures of Jimmy Neutron, Boy Genius
- The Adventures of Pete & Pete (Οι Περιπέτειες των Πητ και Πητ)
- Yakkity Yak

=== Foreign series ===
- El diario de Daniela (Ντανιέλα) (2001)
- La mentira (2001)
- Ángela (2001)
- Alondra (2001)
- Nunca te olvidaré (2002)
- Tres Mejores (Τρεις Γυναίκες) (2002)
- Entre el amor y el odio (2005)
- Обреченная стать звездой (2005)

== Controversy ==
During airings of SpongeBob SquarePants on Channel 9 in November 2007, the National Council for Radio and Television started investigations regarding a claim made by one of its members, in which he says that "the show contains violent scenes for children." Another show named "Full 9" was also investigated by the Greek National Council for Radio and Television, and as a result was cancelled in March 2006, after being described as a "casino" and that it encouraged gambling.

Channel 9 was also heavily criticised throughout the mid 2000s for its mistreatment of staff, with the staff being continually threatened by the station's owners, and the channel having to fire 3/4 of its workforce at one point, after a result of massive budget cuts, and the consideration of a new owner, meanwhile the channel was starting to perform poorly in the ratings, after the occurrence of these events and the continuous reruns of cartoons and series.

== Legacy ==
A telemarketing show promoting a camera called "L'espion" by Oikos Missias which aired on Channel 9 (then called Polis) and TV 10, one of its co-operating channels at the time, gained attention in the mid-2010s, as it was featured in a reaction video made by popular YouTuber 2J, which has surpassed 2 million views. In the video, he makes fun of the supposedly realistic acting and the script.
