= New Epsilon TV =

Greek private television station

- Country: Greece
- Headquarters: Goumenitsis St. 24, Peristeri

Programming
- Language(s): Greek

Ownership
- Owner: Star Hellenic Radio Television Single Member S.A.

History
- Founded: 20 March 1992
- Launched: 1994
- Closed: 28 September 2025
- Replaced by: Naftemporiki TV
- Former names: S.TV (1994-2008); Shop TV (2008-2011); Body In Balance (2011-2012); Zoom TV (2012-2014); Extra (2014-2018)

Links
- Website: Official website

Availability

Terrestrial
- Digea: Channel 31 (Ymittos, Parnitha, Aegina, Oktonia, Prasino, Chalcis, Avlonas, Vari, Nea Stira, Laurium, Anavyssos, Sounion, Nea Makri, Darditsa)

New Epsilon TV was a private regional television station based in Peristeri, Attica.

== History ==
=== E Channel ===
E Channel started operating on Wednesday, September 11, 2013, replacing 902 TV, bought by Vrionis. In 2017, the channel was sold to Ivan Savvidis and replaced by Open TV.

=== Extra Channel ===
The channel operated by Star Hellenic Radio Television SMSA was initially known as Shop TV, and was owned by Telemarketing (62,5%). On December 15, 2011, it was replaced with a Greek version of Body In Balance. One year later, it was bought by Kiopra Commercial Ltd. (78,7%), and from December 6 of that year was renamed to Zoom TV as programming from the newly established block called GR from Makis Triantafyllopoulos, would take up most of BIB's schedule from March 19, 2013, and was the main one to host the block, also managed by Triantafyllopoulos, which would be also hosted by local television stations throughout Greece:

- Archipelagos TV (Lesbos, Chios and Samos) out of service
- ΑRT (Tripoli)
- Astra TV (Thessaly)
- Channel 4U now Notos TV (Crete)
- Corfu Channel (Corfu)
- CreteTV (Heraklion)
- Delta TV (Evros)
- Diktyo 1 (Kastoria)
- Dion TV (Thessaloniki and Pieria)
- ENA Channel (Kavala)
- ENA TV (Lamia)
- FLASH TV (Western Macedonia)
- Ionian Channel (Zakynthos)
- Irida TV (Rhodes and Dodecanese)
- Max TV (Nafplio) out of service
- Mesogeios TV (Messenia)
- New Television later Amfipoli (Serres) out of service
- ORT (Pyrgos)
- Sitia TV (Crete)
- Star TV (Drama)
- Super B (Patras and Western Greece) out of service
- TV 10 now FORMedia (Trikala)
- TV Kosmos (Rhodes and Dodecanese)
- XTV now Atlas TV (Chalkidiki, Imathia and Pella) out of service
- Zeus TV (Naxos) out of service

His signature talk shows Zougla and Kitrinos Typos would also be featured in the programming block. The main news bulletin was first hosted by Giorgos Karameros, and later, by Giorgos Noulas. The channel was renamed to Extra Channel in summer 2014. On June 4, 2018, the channel was replaced as New Epsilon TV. Zoom TV was formerly included on Cosmote TV, on channel 664. The Greek version of BIB is currently available on Cosmote TV.

In 2024, Kiopra Commercial Ltd. purchased the remaining 21,3% of the channel, owning 100% which was later sold to Dimitris Melissanidis and on September 28, 2025 was replaced by Naftemporiki TV.

==== Programming ====
The list includes productions by Zoom TV. Most of the shows listed were cancelled in late 2013, with certain shows and presentators moving to Vriones' other stations, Extra Channel and E Channel.

- Magazino Live – presented by Kim Kilian.
- Atheatos Kosmos – news program; presented by Kostas Chardavellas.
- O Palios einai Alios... – presented by Elda Panopoulou.
- +Ergasia – presented by Matthildi Maggira.
- Reportaz – presented by Petros Kousoulos.
- Ego... o Enzo kai o Vincenzo – cooking show; presented by Vicenzo Zanny.
- Perivallon SOS – presented by professor Panagiotis Christodoulakis.
- Ta Asteria Spiti Sas – show about astrology; presented by Christos Ntoublis.
- E-Shop – presented by Maria Siniori.
- G Polywood – presented by Giorgos Polychroniou.
- Weekend – presented by Marialena Andreou.
- Nikites – presented by Katerina Zagoraiou.
- Oti Kineitai – presented by Vasilis Sarimpalides.
- Pare Kosme – presented by Yannis Papathanasis.
- Treis laloun kai dio choreuoun – presented by Lampros Panagiotou.
- Paikse Mpala
- Ta Kounavia
- Koritsia stin Priza – presented by Menia Koukou and Christianna Kochlatzi.
- Makeleio 4 – presented by Stefanos Chios. (2013-2014)
- Blog Box (2013-2014)
- Antio gia Panta, den tha tous ksechasoume pote – presented by actor Vaggelis Tsigaras.
- Ante Geia – presented by Takis Tsoukalas.
- Zoom...e – presented by Maria Dimitreli.
