= Attica TV =

Greek television station

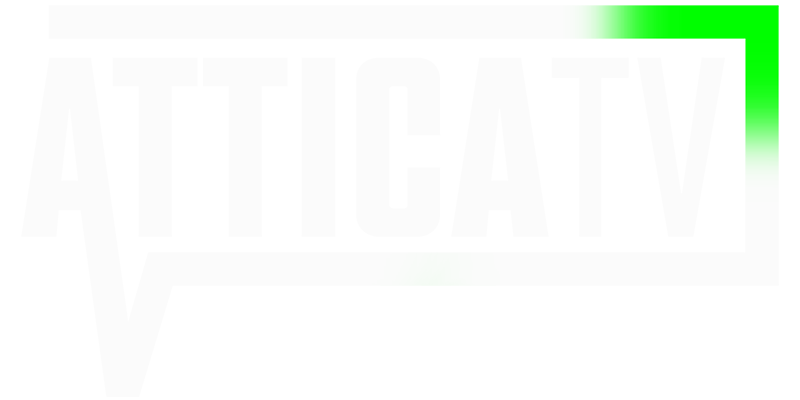
- Attica TV new logo (2025-present)
- Country: Greece
- Broadcast area: Attica, Argosaronikos, central and southern Evia, northwest Cyclades, Kythira, Boeotia, parts of Peloponnese
- Headquarters: Aspropyrgos, West Attica, Greece

Programming
- Language: Greek
- Picture format: 576i (SDTV)

Ownership
- Owner: Municipal Television Company of Aspropyrgos
- Sister channels: Action 24

History
- Founded: 10 June 1996
- Launched: 20 March 1997
- Former names: Thriasio TV (1997-2009)

Links
- Website: Official website

Availability

Terrestrial
- Digea: Channel 30 (Ymittos, Parnitha, Aegina, Oktonia, Prasino, Chalcis, Avlonas, Vari, Nea Stira, Laurium, Anavyssos, Sounion, Nea Makri, Darditsa)

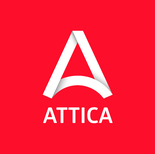
Old logo (2022-2025)

Attica TV is a Greek municipal television station of regional range based in Aspropyrgos.

== History ==
The station started broadcasting on March 20, 1997 as Thriasio TV. In October 2008 it was put into trial operation due to an upgrade of the equipment and eight months later it was now fully operational under its current name (Attica TV). Since July 2010 the station is broadcasting digitally through Digea, while since mid-2012 it has been collaborating with the religious channel of Thessaloniki 4E TV to rebroadcast its program in Attica.

Employees of the station went to work retention on March 1, 2012 because they were unpaid for nine months. On May 7, 2015, shipowner Yiannis Karagiorgis bought 51% of the station's shares, joining it to the newly built HellasNet television network owned by him. A year later, the sudden arrest of the shipowner by the Hellenic Police following an international warrant by the Dutch authorities for fraud, forgery and fraudulent bankruptcy in which HellasNet was also involved became the reason for the departure of the municipal channel from the network with the return of 51% of the shares and restoring it to the old program.

== Program ==
The channel's program includes self-produced informative, entertainment, cultural and musical shows, news bulletins at 18:00 and 21:00 with local government news, foreign series and films (western) and speeches from the Municipal Council of Aspropyrgos. Democracy Now! has aired on the channel since August 2013, usually in the late-night and early-morning hours.

Prior to February 2012, the program did not include broadcasts and bulletins, as a result of which it was characterized as a "ghost channel", while during the period it was on HellasNet, the network's informative emission, called "LIVE" was also broadcast for 6 months hosted by Kostas Argyros who later left Attica TV and HellasNet.

From 2017 until the middle of 2022, he rebroadcast the Vergina TV news emission Commenting on Current Affairs presented by Stergios Kalogiros, which is still broadcast on Smile TV.

From the middle of 2017, the informational emission about the local government Polls, presented by the journalist Giorgos Laimos, began to be broadcast daily.

From 2019 until the summer of 2021, it broadcast the informative emission NET24 presented by the journalist Vassilis Talamagas, which from October 2021 until today is broadcast on RISE TV.

From 2018 to mid-2022 Attica TV partnered with the Social Business Channel, with both stations broadcasting their program to each other. Through SBC, the station was also broadcast from Cosmote TV in channel 654 and with the end of the cooperation with Attica TV, the broadcast of the financial programs Marketing in Practice and There is a Solution was stopped and SBC continues with its online presence.

From January 9, 2023, 30% of the Attica TV program is being diversified with new emissions and news bulletins.

From January 13 of the same year, Attica TV broadcasts again on the subscription platform of Cosmote TV, in channel 653.

== Technical problems ==
Previously in analog television, the station had a low image quality and sometimes noise was appearing on the screen and the sound signal was weak. Later the problem was improved. It was originally channel 47 and it used to accept interference from Mega Channel and after was channel 63 it used to accept interference from Alpha TV too.
