= Magenta TV (Greece) =

Greek pay television services

- Type: Private (subsidiary of OTE Group)
- Industry: Telecommunication
- Founded: September 2008
- Headquarters: Erimanthou 15, Kifissia, Athens, Greece
- Area served: Greece
- Products: Satellite television OTT video streaming platform
- Owner: OTE
- Parent: OTE
- Website: www.magentatv.gr

Magenta TV is the corporate name for two pay television services in Greece, owned by Greek telecommunication operator OTE Group a subsidiary of Deutsche Telekom. The two services are as follows:

- Magenta TV via Streaming – Streaming platform
- Magenta TV via Satellite – Satellite television service

Magenta TV Satellite broadcasts on Ku band from Eutelsat 9B at 9.0°E featuring DVB-S2 -8PSK/MPEG-4 technology. In June 2012, OTE TV had 76,345 subscribers. In July 2017, after more than five years of operation, it was announced that the Magenta TV (then Cosmote TV) package had reached 510,000 subscribers. By the end of March 2021, Magenta TV had 578.000 subscribers, making it the market leader in Greek TV services. In September 2026 the service was rebranded under the name Magenta TV.

The OTT platform can be used on Windows and Linux operating systems (via web browser), Android & iOS mobile devices, Android TV boxes, LG, Samsung & Sony TVs. Magenta TV also provides an Android TV powered box with a dedicated Magenta TV shortcut.

== History ==
In 1999, it was announced that television station Alpha TV was considering a co-operation with ERT and Greek Telecommunications giant OTE to launch a digital television platform. Despite such plans being approved by the management boards of the said companies in February 2000, they were abandoned in September of the same year, as soon as OTE, which had launched a package of channels through Hotbird, left the project. Alpha TV and ERT would separately proceed with the launch of platforms Alpha Digital and ERT Digital; they ended up shutting down due to financial difficulties and limited subscriber base. The said package would continue transmitting, featuring international themed channels, which were gradually replaced with Greek local ones.

In 2009, OTE launched the service as Conn-x TV and was initially available within Athens, Thessaloniki, Larissa, Patras and Heraklion. Eventually, it rolled out to more cities in the country.

In October 2011, Conn-x TV was re-branded as OTE TV via Conn-x. At the same time, OTE launched their long-anticipated satellite service known as OTE TV via Satellite. Both services operate under the OTE TV brand and use the same logo.

In March 2012, OTE TV had 63,497 subscribers. OTE decided to reorganize the TV unit and a new commercial directorate was created aiming to commercially push the TV service to OTE and non OTE broadband customers by enhancing the quality of the content offered, creating new TV packs with OTE branded channel and focusing on a new hybrid service using satellite for linear transmission and broadband for on demand content. By the end of June 2012, reports say that the subscribers of OTE TV, both satellite and IP customers, had reached a total of 76,345. In November 2013, following a management restructuring, OTE TV reached 230,000 subscribers, most of them using the satellite service. In August 2014, the number of OTE TV subscribers surpassed 300,000 customers.

By the end of June 2015, OTE TV had 377,548 subscribers, while in June 2016 the platform had 458,920 subscribers (21.6% rise).

In January 2016, OTE TV announced the creation of OTE History, Greece's first local documentary channel, exclusively focused on Greek history, culture, and civilization.

In August 2016 the OTE TV platform surpassed Nova Greece's subscribers reaching 462,000 customers.

In November 2016 OTE TV changed its name to Cosmote TV and its respective branded channels as Cosmote Cinema, Cosmote Sports, and Cosmote History. Moreover, as of November 2016, Cosmote TV has agreements with three of the six major studios, Walt Disney Pictures, Paramount Pictures and Universal Pictures.

In January 2017 Cosmote TV reached 500,000 subscribers. In July 2017 it was referred that Cosmote TV had reached 510,000 subscribers.

In 2017, Cosmote TV did not renew its co-operation with Discovery, Inc. as discussions between the two parties have not led to a mutually acceptable agreement. The take down of these channels was a successful move as there was no impact on customer figures and customer satisfaction. Therefore, the following seven channels: Discovery Channel, Discovery Science, Investigation Discovery, Animal Planet, Eurosport 1, Eurosport 2 and TLC were replaced by BBC Earth, Crime & Investigation, CBS Reality, Fine Living, Food Network, Fox Sports, Nautical Channel, Outdoor Channel, Viasat Explore and Viasat Nature.

In September 2026 the service was rebranded again under the name Magenta TV.

=== Channel list ===
==== Greek National FTA ====
- Vouli
- ERT1
- ERT2 Sport
- ERT3
- ERT News
- ERT Cosmos
- ANT1
- Alpha TV
- Star Channel
- Skai TV
- Makedonia TV
- Mega Channel
- Open TV

==== Greek Regional FTA ====
- Attica TV
- Action 24
- One Channel
- Kontra Channel
- Naftemporiki
- 4E TV
- TV 100
- Vergina TV Central Macedonia
- Center TV
- ENA Channel
- CreteTV
- New Television Crete
- Star Central Greece

==== Greek Fast Channels ====
- Mega News

==== Advertising Channels ====
- Magenta TV Promo Channel

==== Cinema & Series ====
Magenta Cinema Logo

Magenta Series Logo

- Magenta Cinema (3 channels)
- Magenta Series (2 channels)
- Village Cinema
- TCM
- FX Life
- FX

==== Sports ====
Magenta Sport Logo

- Magenta Sport Highlights
- Magenta Sport Start
- Magenta Sport League (4 channels)
- Magenta Sport (9 channels)
- Magenta Sport 4K
- Novasports News
- Novasports Prime
- Novasports Start
- Novasports (6 channels)
- Novasports Premier League
- Novasports Extra (4 channels)
- Nautical Channel
- Motorvision Plus
- Ginx TV

==== Documentary ====
Magenta History Logo

- Magenta History
- National Geographic
- National Geographic Wild
- BBC Earth
- Viasat History
- Viasat Nature
- Viasat Explore
- Crime & Investigation
- Museum TV

==== Lifestyle ====
- E!
- Luxe.tv
- FashionTV
- My Zen TV

==== Kids ====
- Disney Channel
- Disney Jr.
- BabyTV
- Duck TV
- Smile TV
- Keedoo

==== Music ====
- MAD TV
- MAD Viral
- Panik TV
- Mezzo TV
- Stingray CMusic
- Stingray iConcerts

==== News ====
- BBC News
- Sky News
- CNN
- DW-TV
- France 24 (English and French)
- Al Jazeera
- Al Arabiya
- Asharq News
- Bloomberg TV Europe
- CNBC Europe
- Euronews Greek
- Euronews English

==== Adult ====
- Blue Hustler (with extra cost)
- Sirina TV (with extra cost)
- Dorcel TV (with extra cost)
- Hustler TV (with extra cost)
- Vixen (with extra cost)
