= Asti Radio Television =

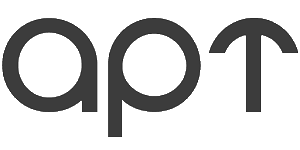
- Country: Greece
- Broadcast area: Attica, Argosaronikos, central and southern Evia
- Headquarters: Kallithea

Programming
- Language(s): Greek
- Picture format: 4:3 (576i, SDTV)

Ownership
- Owner: City News S.A.
- Parent: Georgios Karatzaferis

History
- Launched: 14 February 1990
- Former names: TeleCity (1990-2001); TeleAsty (2001-2012)

Links
- Website: arttv.info

Availability

Terrestrial
- Digea: Channel 30 (Ymittos, Parnitha, Aegina, Oktonia, Prasino, Chalcis, Avlonas, Vari, Nea Stira, Laurium, Anavyssos, Sounion, Nea Makri, Darditsa)

ART (Asti Radio Television) is a Greek private regional free-to-air informative television station, broadcasting in Attica.

== History ==
The station began with test broadcasts on February 14, 1990 under the name TeleCity and a month later with its full schedule. In 2001, it was renamed TeleAsty (Greek translation of TeleCity) and in 2012 to its current name (ART).

== Program ==
Includes informative shows, shows about the Popular Orthodox Rally that supports the channel, documentaries and the music show Style GR which is one of the longest running shows on Greek television with video clips of Greek and foreign songs, both new and older from the decade of 1980s and 1990s. It also featured telemarketing.

== Range and licenses ==
On September 10, 1993, the operation of the channel was legalized based on the 19230/E license of local scope in the region of Attica. However, the station has since its inception illegally extended its reach nationwide. Since the middle of 2013, it was considered as a nationwide station.

In the competition for nationwide licenses in July 2016, ART TV, together with the then Epsilon TV (today's Open TV), Makedonia TV, and Mega Channel, were excluded from the competition process for formal and financial reasons.

On April 1, 2018, ART TV was finally obliged by the broadcasting law to broadcast only in Attica, Argosaronikos, Central and Southern Evia and a part of the Cyclades.

In 2018, the channel broadcast digitally terrestrially in Cyprus as well, while in previous years it had a collaboration with the Cypriot channel Extra TV of Limassol.
