= One Channel (Greece) =

Greek television channel

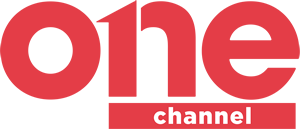
- Country: Greece
- Broadcast area: Greece
- Affiliates: Mega Channel
- Headquarters: Piraeus 131 Central office Grava school complex Athens, Greece

Programming
- Language(s): Greek
- Picture format: 1080i HDTV (downscaled to 16:9 aspect ratio 576i for the SDTV feed)

Ownership
- Owner: Attica Television S.A.

History
- Launched: 2 May 2019 (Online); 23 May 2019 (Satellite and IPTV); 1 November 2022 (Regional free-to-air)
- Replaced: Channel 9

Links
- Website: www.onechannel.gr

Availability

Terrestrial
- Digea: Channel 30 (Ymittos, Parnitha, Aegina, Oktonia, Prasino, Chalcis, Avlonas, Vari, Nea Stira, Lavrio, Anavyssos, Sounion, Nea Makri, Darditsa)

One Channel is a Greek private television channel broadcasting from Athens.

== History ==
On 2 September 2016, Vangelis Marinakis, owner of Alter Ego Media won one of the four national television licenses auctioned in Greece after spending EUR 73.8m in a highly unusual competitive bidding process. On 29 September, the company patented the name and the logo of the network. After the auction was canceled, the network lost its licence and didn't launch.

Alter Ego didn't participate in the second auction for the seven television licenses (2017–2018), because the company had recently bought Lambrakis Press Group on 31 May 2017, which owned 22% of the shares of Mega Channel. On 18 October 2018, it tried to buy one of the last two remaining TV licenses for 3,5m €.

Due to the elections that took place in the country, the network wanted to cover the event. The channel took a temporary licence on 10 June. By the end of August, One Channel started producing network programming with the addition of well-known Greek journalists.

The first broadcast of the channel was on 17 April 2019, via the news site In.gr, initially for the coverage of the presentation of Giannis Moralis, candidate for mayor of Piraeus.

The first official broadcast was on 2 May, via its official site and on 23 May started broadcasting via satellite and IPTV on Nova and Cosmote TV.

One Channel is the official television license holder and was initially expected to start broadcasting digitally on November 11, 2019. However, a few days ago (on November 1), the company acquired by auction, from Teletypos S.A., the Mega Channel branding, logo and vast program library, submitting a bid of 33,999,999 euros. The company, after the purchase of the station as a whole, reopened Mega Channel, on a trial basis on February 11, 2020, while its normal program started 6 days later. From November 1, 2022, it also broadcasts terrestrial digital, being a regional channel replacing Channel 9.
