= Super TV (Greek TV channel) =

Regional TV channel in Macedonia, Greece

- Broadcast area: Central Macedonia
- Headquarters: Nea Moudania

Ownership
- Owner: Radiotileoptiki Super S.A.

History
- Founded: 22 May 1992
- Launched: 1992
- Closed: 2019

Super TV was a Greek regional television channel based in Nea Moudania, Chalkidiki broadcasting in the Central Macedonia region. It started its operation in 1992 and was owned by Radiotileoptiki Super S.A., which was founded on May 22 of that year. At the end of 2003, the company's activities were modified.

On 29 July 2014, the NCRTV gave the station permission to broadcast digitally in the geographical areas PZ2 and PZ3; this replaced its analogue broadcasts from the Vavdos and Polygyros transmitters (on UHF channels 42 and 47, respectively) and expanded its reach from Chalkidiki to all of Central Macedonia.

Due to debts owed to Digea provider, the station stopped broadcasting at the end of 2015, while it resumed operation the following year, collaborating with Smile TV to rebroadcast its program, using a second name (Smile++) until 27 April 2018 when it started another collaboration with Asti Radio Television. Later Super TV Chalkidiki ceased its operations in early 2019 while in late 2022, the NCRTV decided to remove this channel from its television list.

== Programming ==
Super TV broadcast local entertainment and information programs on issues of concern throughout the area of Chalkidiki and the region of Central Macedonia, as well as two daily newscasts (at 13:00 and at 21:00).

== Super Radio 99.5 ==
In Radiotileoptiki Super S.A. it also owns the radio station of the same name, Super Radio, which continues to broadcast in Chalkidiki and parts of the adjacent regions of Thessaloniki and Pieria from its transmitter in Vavdos on 99.5 MHz FM frequency. From the end of 2010, he started a collaboration with Libero 107.4 of Thessaloniki for the rebroadcast of his sports program. However, since 2014 the station broadcasts from its own transmitter in Vavdos, broadcasting on the same frequency as Mount Chortiatis, covering the same areas as Super Radio 99.5 with this collaboration between them being interrupted. At the beginning of 2022, a new collaboration with Zoo 90.8 of Thessaloniki began, broadcasting as Zoo Chalkidiki 99.5.
