= Kontra Channel =

Greek TV channel

- Country: Greece
- Broadcast area: Attica, Argosaronikos, central & southern Evia, northwestern Cyclades, Kythira, Boeotia and parts of Peloponnese
- Headquarters: Dimitras 31, Tavros, Athens

Programming
- Language(s): Greek
- Picture format: 16:9 (576i, SDTV)

Ownership
- Owner: Kontra TV Marketing Services Single Member S.A.

History
- Launched: 6 September 2010
- Replaced: TeleFOS (1994-2010)

Links
- Website: kontrachannel

Availability

Terrestrial
- Digea: Channel 31 (Ymittos, Parnitha, Aegina, Oktonia, Prasino, Chalcis, Avlonas, Vari, Nea Stira, Lavrio, Anavyssos, Sounion, Nea Makri, Darditsa)

Streaming media
- Kontra Channel: Live Streaming

Old logo (21/5/2018-28/8/2023)

Kontra Channel is a Greek private regional television station based in Tavros. It broadcasts terrestrial digital free-to-air from 14 broadcast centers in Attica and Euboea and satellite via the subscription platforms of Nova and Cosmote TV.

== History ==
The station started operating in 1994 under the name TeleFOS and was basically the first in Greece with shows around ecology, healthy lifestyle and alternative medicine. On September 6, 2010 it was renamed Kontra Channel due to a change in ownership.

== Ownership ==
From the beginning and for a decade, it belonged to the limited liability company Konstantinos Papanikolas and Co. in which the shareholder was the founder of the station Costas Papanikolas, who was also president of the party Ecologists of Greece while previously he was a candidate for the Popular Orthodox Rally in the 2009 Greek legislative election.

On February 6, 2004, Bio-rescue Broadcasting and Ecological S.A. was established, with the distinctive title Telefos - Nea Zoi which re-took over the channel, with its founder taking over as chairman and CEO. A few months later, its statute was modified, with the expansion of activities.

In the middle of 2010, journalist George Kouris acquired 75% of the television station whose operator gets its current name as Kontra Media S.A.

In the period 2023-2024, Kontra Channel was spun off from Kontra Media S.A. and absorbed by the newly established subsidiary of the first company under the name Kontra TV Marketing Services S.M.S.A. which has common activities with its parent company.
