= ORT (TV channel) =

Greek radio and television broadcaster in Elis

Olympiaki Radiofonia Tileorasi
- Country: Greece
- Headquarters: 5th klm of Pyrgos-Patras national road, Pyrgos, Elis

Programming
- Language(s): Greek

Ownership
- Owner: Olympic Radio Television S.A.

History
- Founded: 13 April 1993
- Launched: 1993

Links
- Website: Official site

Availability

Terrestrial
- Digea: 28 UHF (Ano Doliana, Asea, Levidi); 36 UHF (Aroi, Kalavryta, Thermo); 37 UHF (Kranidi, Nafplio, Troezen); 41 UHF (Ainos, Fyteies, Ithaca, Koryfi, Zacharo); 42 UHF (Parnon, Anavryti, Kythira); 44 UHF (Petalidi, Aetos, Gargalianoi); 46 UHF (Xylokastro, Desfina, Geraneia, Lidoriki, Nemea)

Streaming media
- Patris News: ORT TV Live

Olympiaki Radiofonia Tileorasi (Greek: Ολυμπιακή Ραδιοφωνία Τηλεόραση, abbreviated ORT) is a Greek local radio and television station serving the Elis regional unit. Its headquarters are in Pyrgos. Its former logo would depict three Olympic symbols, hence its name. It a broadcasts in Peloponnese, in southern Central Greece, in Aetolia, in Kythira, in Phocis, in Corinthian gulf, in islands of Argosaronic, in southern Ionian islands, in Boeotia and in western Attica.

== Ownership ==
The same-named company operating the radio and television station was established on April 14, 1993. Its first headquarters are located on 28th October 54. On 1997, its statute was modified; a description of the channel's then-new logo was added. On March 23, 1998, the channel's operation was legalized under the 6616/Ε license, by the Ministry for the Press while at the same time moved its headquarters to Xanthou 2.

Its statute was modified again from 1998 by adding the purpose of producing programs and commercials, conducting cultural events and expanding online and other services. On December 11, 2003, its statute was modified again, by adding the purpose of founding and operating a radio station.

At the end of 2017, moved its headquarters to the fifth kiliometer of the Pyrgos-Patras national road where it remains until today. Leonidas Varouksis, the owner of the newspaper Patris, was the station's former president.

== Programming ==
The channel's programming also includes telemarketing, children's shows, foreign films, and external productions, such as travel show Travel Guide with Thanos Papadimitriou, motorsport show Pano apo ta Oria with Stratos Foteinelis and the Kontra Channel show Epi tou Piestiriou. It's also been broadcasting programming from MAD TV.

The channel would formerly air programming from Channel 9, as part of the network POLIS Net, and Zoom TV.

- Auto Sprint - show about automobiles, motorcycles and motorsport; presented by Stratos Photinelis.
- Endikseis kai Apodikseis - news program; presented by Giorgos Fakos.
- Anoixta Xartia - news program; presented by Giannis Argiropoulos, and later, by Panos Paulopoulos.
- Olympiada Oli i Ellada - tribute to the 2004 Summer Olympics; produced by the Ministry of Culture and Sports and the Organizing Committee of the Olympic Games.
- I Gi tis Ephorias - agricultural show; produced by the Ministry of Agriculture.
- Exodos - entertainment show; presented by the channel's former executive, Periklis Patsouris.
- Ora gia Spor - sports show; presented by Giorgos Asteris.
- Cinepolis - show about the cinema.

== ORT FM 92,3 ==
In addition to the channel, there is also the radio station of the same name (ORT FM 92.3) that covers Elis and areas from the southern side of the Ionian Islands and also the Peloponnese, having an informative, cultural, sports and entertainment program. Since 2010, it has been broadcasting programming from Skai 100.3 where previously, since 2002, it was broadcast by Ionion FM. At that time, ORT FM was broadcasting programming from Sfera 102.2 of Athens.

== See also ==
- List of Greek-language television channels
