= Action 24 =

Greek television channel

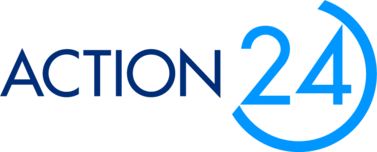
- Action 24 new logo (2022-present)
- Country: Greece
- Headquarters: Marousi, Athens

Programming
- Language: Greek
- Picture format: 576i (SDTV); 1080i (HDTV)

Ownership
- Owner: Radio TV Promotion S.A.

History
- Launched: October 1990
- Former names: TVΜ (1990-1992); Magic (1992-2008); Sport TV (2008-2013)

Links
- Website: Action 24

Availability

Terrestrial
- Digea: Channel 31 (Ymittos, Parnitha, Aegina, Oktonia, Prasino, Chalcis, Avlonas, Vari, Nea Stira, Laurium, Anavyssos, Sounion, Nea Makri, Darditsa)

Action 24 is a private regional television channel whose facilities are located in the area of Marousi. It broadcasts terrestrial digital from 14 broadcast centers in Attica and Evia and satellite via the subscription platforms of Nova and Cosmote TV.

== History ==
The station started its operation in October 1990 from the area of Megara under the name TVM (TV Megara). In 1992 it was renamed TV Magic while its facilities were moved to Piraeus. It is one of the most historic and important local television stations of Attica. In 1995 it was renamed to Magic Piraeus and later at the end of 1998 to Magic TV.

Since 2000 it has broadcast a program of mainly sports content and broadcasts of the Olympiacos team. In 2004, it was licensed for satellite broadcasting. In May 2008 it was renamed to Sport TV and in January 2013 to its current name (Action 24), severing any connection with the Olympiacos team.

== Program ==
The channel's program initially included mainly music (video clips) and telemarketing advertising messages. In 2000, it turned into an informative station specializing in the central political scene, but also in local news, mainly in Piraeus. Its schedule included a variety of sports broadcasts, shows and newscasts.

As Magic, it had established itself as the channel for the fans of the Olympiakos team, with the most popular show Gate (Thira) 7 with all the news of the team with its organized fan, Takis Tsoukalas, discussions, comments about the team, but also with telephone communication with fans and for some time he broadcast the matches of the Olympiakos team in all sports. Today it broadcasts various sports from all over the world.

Its program is framed around sports and mainly includes broadcasts of football matches, while it has also shown entertainment and information shows, the children's animated series Football Stories produced in Spain, Le Petit Nicolas produced in France, and a telemarketing box.

In the past, programs from the archive of Skai TV (Eat and Fit, Chef on the Air and Seven Days of Science) were also broadcast from 2017, the nationwide station selling programs to the regional one. Other shows that coincided with the start of their collaboration were the co-productions with Skai.gr portal Today, a magazine presented by Myra Barba, and Newsroom, an evening newscast presented by Niki Lymperaki, the Sports Live newscast with Antonis Katsaros, the Evening Report with Giorgos Kouvaras, and the talk show X2 with Yiannis Politis. The purpose was to frame the program with informative broadcasts, due to the gradual change in the nature of SKAI's program.

These collaborations ended a year later, with SKAI attempting to set up a new informative station called SKAI 24, which in the end was never created, because a television station with a non-informative/entertainment character is expressly prohibited from informational and sports programs, even entertainment shows, because they are thematic. However, the station renewed its program with new sports shows, while also adding foreign series, produced in Italy.

From August 9, 2022, the channel, after the change of ownership, broadcasts EFL Cup matches, while it completely removed telemarketing broadcasts from its program, where they occupied part of the sports program for a few years. From December 5 of the same year, the channel broadcasts an entirely informative program.

== Logos ==
1992-1993	1993-1995	1995-1998	1998-2002	2003-2006	2006-2008	2008-2013	2013-2014	2014-22/11/2022	23/11/2022-present
