= Wind Vision =

Greek digital television service

- Type: Broadcast
- Country: Greece
- Availability: National
- Owner: Wind Hellas
- Launch date: April 2018
- Dissolved: December 2022
- Official website: Wind Vision
- Replaced by: Eon TV

Wind Vision was a Greek digital television service introduced by Wind Hellas in April 2018.

It was based on a broadband IPTV infrastructure, where digital sound and vision was carried through a telephone line to a set-top box and the customer's television.

On 31 December 2022, Wind Vision was replaced by EON TV.

== History ==
On 25 April 2018, Wind CEO Nassos Zarkalis introduced the company's IPTV service. It was the first Android TV set-top box in Greece with Netflix integrated. Also, it was the first service offering 4K resolution with HDR10 technology.

The service offered more than 60 live television channels, access to all Google services such as Google Play Movies, Google Play Music, YouTube, the use of an electronic program guide, multi-screen and on-demand (seven-day catch-up and restart). It was available to all Wind fixed-line subscribers and provides two packages, family pack and full pack, which included all of the Novasports channels. By the end of March 2021, it was announced that Wind Vision had 80,000 subscribers making it the fourth largest multichannel television provider.

On 1 June 2022, Wind Hellas announced that its stores now have the EON TV platform for sale, essentially marking the first combined product action of Nova and Wind. The completion of the merger under the brand of the first by the end of year is an intention for United Group, providing "holistic" telecommunications and content services (fixed and mobile telephony, Internet and pay television). After nine days (10 June) it was announced that as of 31 December of the same year, the Wind Vision service would be being canceled as part of the consolidation, giving the owners of the service the possibility to replace it with the EON TV platform with exclusive preferential terms.

== Channels list ==
Greek-language television channels

- ERT1
- ERT2
- ERT3
- Mega Channel
- Skai TV
- Alpha TV
- ANT1
- Star Channel
- Open TV
- Makedonia TV

Entertainment channels

- Fox
- Fox Life
- E!
- TLC

Sports channels

- Novasports 24HD
- Novasports 1HD
- Novasports 2HD
- Novasports 3HD
- Novasports 4HD
- Novasports 5HD
- Eurosport 1
- Eurosport 2
- Extreme Sports Channel
- Outdoor Channel
- Nautical Channel
- Motorvision.TV
- Ginx TV

Documentary channels

- National Geographic
- National Geographic Wild
- Discovery HD
- Travel Channel International
- CBS Reality
- History
- Crime & Investigation
- RT Documentary

== See also ==
- Eon TV
- Wind Hellas
