= Battle of Kakosalesi =

Military engagement in 1825 during the Greek Revolution

- Part of the Greek War of Independence
Date	26 September 1825
Location	Avlonas, Attica, Eyalet of the Archipelago, Ottoman Empire
Result	Greek victory

Belligerents
Greek revolutionaries	Ottoman Empire

Commanders and leaders
Athanasios Skourtaniotis	Omer Pasha of Eğriboz

Strength
50	300 (100 cavalry, 200 infantry)

Casualties and losses
2	2

The Battle of Kakosalesi was a military engagement of the Greek War of Independence.

The course of events During the period of the Greek Revolution, and specifically on September 26, 1825, very early in the morning, approximately 150 Turks, coming from Chalkida, attacked the women and children of the village of Kakosalesi (now Avlonas) in which there were no men.

Skourtaniotis was watching the Turks, and his sentry (which probably consisted of 10 men) was the first to clash with the Turkish force in the village, in which skirmishes it is not excluded that women also participated, fighting with stones and wood that they threw from the roofs and windows of their houses. Then came the main force of Skourtaniotis and was involved in the battle which lasted 4 hours, resulting in the flight of the Turks. The losses are recorded as 2 for the Turks and 2 prisoners, and 2 Greeks.

According to a story recorded by a person of origin from Kakosalesi, the women of the village fought bravely and defeated the Turks together with the force of warriors, while it states that pursued they fell into the marshes of the area, where they were all killed by the force of Skourtaniotis who pursued them.
