= Wind Hellas =

Former Greek telecommunications company

Wind Hellas Telecommunications S.A.

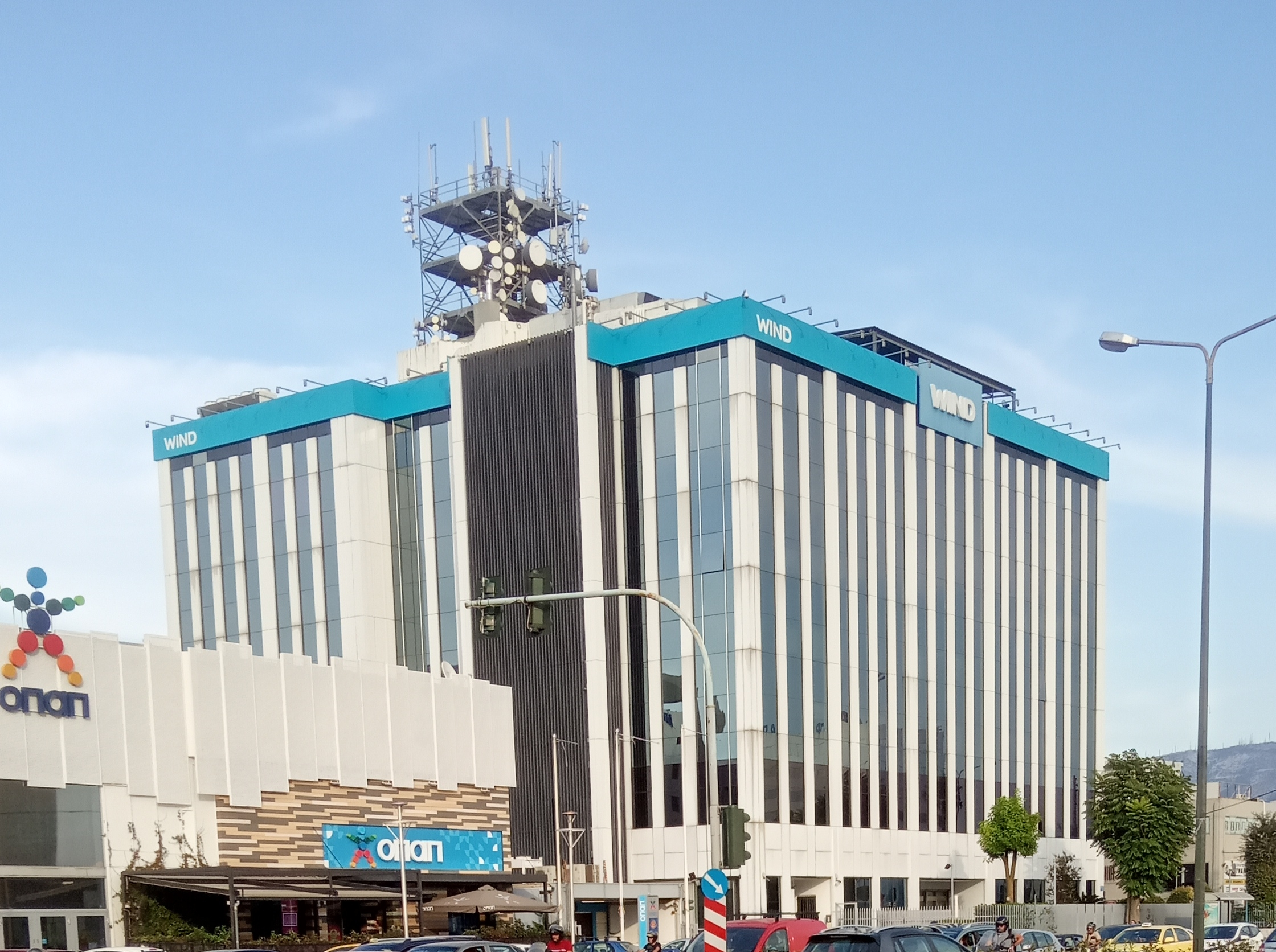
- Formerly: STET Hellas Telecommunications S.A. (1992–2004); TIM Hellas Telecommunications S.A. (2004–2007)
- Type: Subsidiary
- Industry: Telecommunications
- Founded: July 28, 1992; 34 years ago
- Founder: STET
- Defunct: January 11, 2023
- Fate: Merged into Nova Greece
- Successor: Nova Greece
- Headquarters: Athens, Greece
- Area served: Greece
- Key people: Nikos Stathopoulos (Chairman); Panagiotis Georgiopoulos (CEO)
- Products: Landline telephony; Mobile telephony
- Owner: United Group (100%)
- Parent: United Group
- Website: www.wind.gr

Wind Hellas (formerly TELESTET Hellas and later also TIM Hellas) was a Greek integrated telecommunications provider with headquarters in Athens, Greece.

As of September 2010, Wind was the third largest mobile operator in Greece (after Cosmote and Vodafone) with more than 4.4 million active subscribers. The actual numbers for the years after 2015 are confidential but according to the report of the Greek Government for 2017, Wind had a market share of 15-25% of active mobile telephone subscribers and 10-15% share of active fixed line subscribers.

On January 11, 2023, Wind Hellas merged with Nova Greece, therefore fixed and mobile telephony, Internet and other Wind services were rebranded to Nova.

== History ==
=== TELESTET Hellas (1992–2004) ===
In 1992, TELESTET Hellas was founded, as a subsidiary of the Italian company STET. Through this, TELESTET started its commercial operation. On September 30, 1992, the Greek Ministry of Transport and Communications issued a license to STET to create a national mobile telephony services network (GSM). The company invested the sum of 30 billion Greek drachmas (about 88 million Euros) to create the network. This constituted one of the biggest investments in Greece since the end of the Second World War.

Commercial operation started on June 29, 1993, when the first call from a mobile phone took place in the country.

In 1998, TELESTET was the first Greek mobile telephone communications company to be listed in international stock markets, the Nasdaq in New York City and the Euronext Amsterdam.

From September 23, 1999, TELESTET operated Iridium, the first mobile-telephony dedicated satellite in Greece.

In June 2001, TELESTET was the first telecommunications company in Greece and one of the first in the world to obtain ISO 9001:2000 Quality Management certification.

In June 2001, the operator's GPRS service went live. One month later, in July 2001, it was awarded the license to offer a UMTS service for a concession fee of €146.7 million. The UMTS service went live on January 27, 2004.

=== TIM Hellas (2004–2007) ===
On February 8, 2004, the company's name changed to TIM Hellas as a part of Telecom Italia, member of FreeMove, the biggest telecommunications alliance in Europe that consists of the companies Orange (UK/France/Switzerland), Telefónica (Spain), ΤΙΜ (Italy) and T-Mobile (Germany).

On April 4, 2005, TIM agreed to sell its 80.87% equity stake in TIM Hellas to funds advised by Apax Partners and TPG Inc. The transaction was for €1,114.1 million which valued TIM Hellas at €1,600 million or €16.43 per share. The transaction was completed following approval by state authorities in July 2005.

On January 31, 2006, TIM Hellas acquired Q-Telecom, Greece's 4th mobile operator for €350 million and in May 2007 the two mobile networks were merged.

=== Wind Hellas (2007–2021) ===
On February 7, 2007, Apax Partners and TPG announced that TIM Hellas had been purchased outright by Weather Investments, the telecom holding company of Egyptian tycoon Naguib Sawiris, for €500 million of equity plus 2.9 billion Euros of net debt. The company name changed to Wind Hellas on June 5, 2007, in line with Italian telecom operator Wind Telecomunicazioni.

In December 2009, Nassos Zarkalis, previously head of Hellas Online, became CEO of Wind Hellas.

On October 18, 2010, the principal shareholders in Wind Hellas (Mount Kellett Capital, Taconic Capital Advisers, Providence Equity, Anchorage Capital Group, Angelo Gordon and Eton Park International) took over the company and injected €420 million to reduce debt and fund long-term development plans.

=== Acquisition by the United Group and merger with Nova Greece (2021–present) ===
On August 16, 2021, it was announced that United Group, which owns Nova Greece, had purchased Wind Hellas for about €1 billion after weeks of negotiations with the shareholders of Wind Hellas. Then on January 2, 2023, WIND Hellas merged into Nova Greece, abandoning its own brand in favor of that of the acquiring company.

== The crisis and the creditors ==
The economic recession in Greece caused Wind Hellas severe financial difficulties. Sawiris sold the assets of the holding company (Weather Finance III) to a group of creditors, the SSN Ad Hoc Committee. The group of senior bondholders established a new holding company (Largo Ltd.) which took full control of Wind Hellas in December 2010 and appointed a new board of directors.

== Wind Hellas subscriber numbers ==
Wind issues customers with phone numbers that begin with either 693 or 690 followed by a seven digit subscriber number. As Wind also own Q-Telecom, they can also issue numbers starting with 699, but these are currently only allocated to new Q-Card customers. Mobile number portability allows customers to port their numbers to and from all Greek networks so Wind customers can also have telephone numbers that were originally allocated to Vodafone or Cosmote.

== Vodafone merger talks ==
In 2011, Vodafone opened talks with the owners of Wind Hellas regarding merging the two firms' operations in Greece, to better challenge market leader COSMOTE. In February 2012 Vodafone pulled out of the talks.

On July 25, 2020, it was announced that Wind Hellas and Vodafone agreed to merge their base stations and antennas into a newly created company called Vantage Towers Greece, in which Vodafone would hold a 62% and Wind 38%. This newly company will have 5.200 base stations. The idea came after Vodafone Group decided to merge all its antennas and base stations that Vodafone is operating in Europe. On March 26, 2021, when Vantage Towers entered the Frankfurt stock exchange, Wind Hellas sold its 38% stake to Vantage Towers for €288 million. Through the IPO that was launched Wind Hellas bought €100 million in shares.

== Wind Vision ==
On 25 April 2018, Wind CEO Nassos Zarkalis introduced the company's Internet Protocol television service called Wind Vision. It was the first Android TV set-top-box in Greece with Netflix integrated. Also, it was the first service that offered ultra-high-definition television resolution with HDR 10 technology. The service offered more than 60 channels such as FOX, Disney Channel and National Geographic. On 10 June 2022, it was announced that on 31 December of the same year, the service would be discontinued in favor of Nova's EON TV. The removal of the service in December would tease the merger of the two companies.

== See also ==
- Nova Greece
- STET – Società Finanziaria Telefonica
- Telecom Italia
- Telecom Italia Mobile
- Telecommunications in Greece
- Weather Investments
- Wind Telecomunicazioni
- Wind Telecom
- Wind Vision
