= 4E TV =

4E
- Type: Television broadcasting
- Country: Greece
- Headquarters: Ampelokipoi, Thessaloniki

Programming
- Language: Greek
- Picture format: 576i (16:9 SDTV); 4:3 content stretches to 16:9

Ownership
- Owner: RADIO TV STATION GREEK ORTHODOX ECCLESIASTICAL INFORMATIVE BROADCAST S.A.

History
- Founded: 16 December 1993
- Launched: 1994

Links
- Webcast: www.tv4e.gr
- Website: tv4e.gr

Availability

Terrestrial
- Digea: 46 UHF (Cholomon); 48 UHF (Aridaia, Chortiatis, Mouries, Philippion) (C. Macedonia); 40 UHF (Drama, Irakleia, Kato Nevrokopi, Serres); 41 UHF (Kavala, Thasos, Xanthi); 43 UHF (Makri); 47 UHF (Didymoteicho, Kipoi, Pentalofos, Pythio, Soufli) (E. Macedonia and Thrace) [Rebroadcast via Lydia] 40 UHF (Askio, Kella, Orestiada, Prespes); 41 UHF (Kalamitsi, Metaxas, Paliouria, Tsotyli) (W. Macedonia) [Rebroadcast via Osios Nikanor]

4E TV is a Greek private, partly informative with a purely religious content, television station that broadcasts terrestrially in Central Macedonia and is based in Ampelokipoi, Thessaloniki. It was founded in 1993 and started operating in early 1994.

== History ==
The name of the network comes from the initials of the words of the phrase Greek Orthodox Ecclesiastical Informative Broadcast (Greek: Ελληνική Ορθόδοξος Εκκλησιαστική Ενημερωτική Εκπομπή) which is also a phrase of the official full name of the company.

The main inspirer of the creation of the ecclesiastical station 4E was the Archimandrite Theofilos Zisopoulos. In 1993, for the needs of this project, he received a degree in journalism. In 1996 he took over the staff of the station and was elected chairman of the board, a position he held for 17 years, until his death in 2013.

In 1998 the station participated in a tender and received a license to operate as a regional television station.

In 2007 was licensed to "provide free satellite services" by the Greek National Council for Radio and Television. In the same year it was launched via Hellas Sat 2 satellite for Europe, Apstar 2R for Asia and Optus B3 for Australia via UBI World TV platform.

In 2012 it broadcast for a few months in the US, Canada and Central America via the SES-1 satellite.

It is claimed that 4E is the first private regional station in Greece to start broadcasting its program digitally from the Chortiatis and Filippio transmission centers on UHF 50 on October 30, 2008. However, a few months later the digital transmission was forced to be shut down because the network had not set up a provider as ought to do. In 2012, the network started digitally transmitting its programme again alongside TV 100, Euro and Gnomi through the Digital Broadcast Syndication provider, a consortium set up by the four networks. It has been transmitting digitally through Digea since November 21, 2014.

== Programming ==
4E TV features a wide array of programming about the Orthodox faith as well as live Church services. In addition, 4E also provides wholesome, informative and entertaining family programming. Programs are organized by category:

- Theologikes - programmes about the Orthodox faith.
- Latreia - programmes focusing on various church services, including live coverage of the Divine Liturgy service on Sundays.
- Politismos - programmes about Greek culture.
- Enhmerosi - Informational programmes.
- Psigagogia - family entertainment.
- Ekpaideusi - educational series.
- Oikogenia - programmes about family life, raising a family with the Orthodox faith.
- Paidi - children's programmes.
