= Smile TV (Greece) =

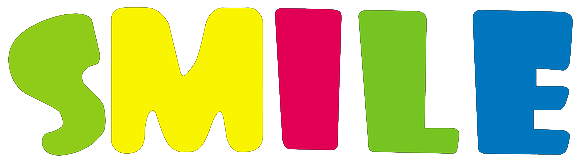
- Country: Greece
- Broadcast area: Attica and Cyprus

Programming
- Language: Greek
- Picture format: 576i (SDTV) 4:3 or 16:9

Ownership
- Owner: Smile TV Services S.A.

History
- Launched: 2013
- Former names: 0-6 TV (1999-2013)

Links
- Website: tvsmile.gr

Availability

Terrestrial
- Digea: Channel 34 (Ymittos, Parnitha, Aegina, Oktonia, Prasino, Chalcis, Avlonas, Vari, Nea Stira, Laurium, Anavyssos, Sounion, Nea Makri, Darditsa)

Smile TV is a television channel available in Attica and Cyprus that broadcasts cartoons and other shows for children between the ages of four to eleven.

== Programming ==
- The Last of the Mohicans
- Sandokan: The Tiger roars again
- Journey to the West – Legends of the Monkey King
- Mimi and Mr. Bobo
- Cloud Trotters
- Vitaminix
- Pocket Dragon Adventures
- Ben 10
- The Princess of Nile
- Els Nimbes
- Extreme Dinosaurs
- Horseland
- Popples
- Adventures of Sonic the Hedgehog
- Oggy and the Cockroaches (st. 1-2)
- Sabrina: The Animated Series
- Marsupilami
- The Adventures of Voopa the Goolash
- Rabbids Invasion
- Gormiti Nature Unleashed
- Power Rangers Jungle Fury
- Vipo: Adventures of the Flying Dog
- Dinofroz
- Angel's Friends
- Monster High
- Pac-Man and the Ghostly Adventures
- DiMiTRi
- Dragon Ball Z
- Digimon Fusion
- Glitter Force
- The Adventures of Super Mario Bros. 3
- Dennis the Menace
- Kong: The Animated Series
- Puppy in My Pocket: Adventures in Pocketville
- The Smurfs
- Rat-A-Tat
- HeartCatch PreCure!
- Kaeloo
- Chloe's Closet
- Super 4
- The Nimbols
- Danger Mouse
- Kikoriki

== Collaborations ==
The channel often cooperates with other TV stations, which outsource the retrieval of cartoons to Smile TV, and use its branding.

- Vergina TV – sister channel, operating since 1993 in Central Macedonia. Co-operation ended in 2017.
- NET – between 2015 and 2018.
- Smile+ – sister channel and successor of local Thessalian station Zeus TV. Started operating on 7 October 2016.
- Smile++ – sister channel and successor of local Macedonian station Super TV. Started operating in October 2017, and stopped on 27 April 2018.
- Smile_ – sister channel and successor of local Thracian station Egnatia TV. Began airing cartoons after approval from the National Television Council on 6 March 2017.
