= ENA Channel =

TV channel in Greece

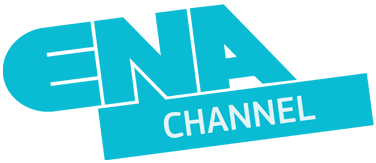
- Country: Greece
- Headquarters: Kavala

Programming
- Language: Greek

Ownership
- Owner: ENA Channel S.A.

History
- Launched: 1991

Links
- Website: enachannel.gr

Availability

Terrestrial
- Digea: 35 UHF (Drama, Irakleia, Kato Nevrokopi, Kavala, Serres, Thasos, Xanthi); 36 UHF (Didymoteicho, Kipoi, Makri, Pentalofos, Pythio, Soufli)

ENA Channel is a regional TV channel, based in Kavala. It covers all of Eastern Macedonia and Thrace, Limnos and Chalkidiki. It was founded in 1991 to help the development of private television. The channel is aimed at informing the public of Eastern Macedonia and Thrace regarding the corresponding issues of Eastern Macedonia and Thrace with three newscasts a day. Apart from informative programs, it has entertainment shows and various other transmissions.

== Property ==
The channel is owned by Kavala Radio and Television S.A. and has the same operation legalisation protocol by the Greek National Council for Radio and Television with Television of Macedonia and Thrace S.A. which operates Center TV (6447/E/20.3.1998).

The channel is half owned by Bill Koukoutinis and Lefteris Koukoutinis, each holding 50% of the shares. The first is one of the founders of the local radio station of the same name called Radio ENA 90.5 FM which has been operating since September 1989, while since 2007 it has been collaborating with the also local Athenian radio station called Real FM 97.8 owned by Nikos Hadjinikolaou to rebroadcast his program in Kavala.

== Programmes ==
Although ENA syndicates show from various other sources, its-in house production company "Videotex" produces the following shows:

Show Title	Presenter	Description
Analyst	Apostolos Atzemidakis	News program with extensive coverage on political, cultural, athletic, financial and agricultural issues. Learn all the latest developments and current affair new of the local and broader community.
More than five	Spiros Latsas	Journalist Spiros Latsas tries to bring the heartbeat of the Municipality on the screen. Politics, economy, growth, as well as the issues and the problems of the area, are discussed with selected guests in the studio, who elaborate and comment on current affairs.
Developments	Yiannis Chatziemanouil	Yiannis Chatziemanouil and his select guests, people who play a significant part in the local community, as well as distinguished personalities with broader recognition all around Greece, discuss in depth current affairs and the crucial political issues of the Municipality and the country in general.
News	Sakis Kolivas, Christina Nefraim	The channel's news section report the local and peripheral news from the areas of Eastern Macedonia and Thrace, presenting reliably a variety of opinions, in order to inform the public fully and soundly.
One with the Earth	Tasos Palestidis	A program that wishes to cover a gap in the news division of the province. Commerce, agriculture, stockbreeding, fishing, hunting, interviews, nutrition, tourism, national news are only some of the subjects discussed. With the participation of actual farmers, fishermen and people involved.
Compass	Tasos Apostolidis	With a man as the compass and the Greek Periphery as the destination, this journey aims to record the problems, but the optimistic message as well, of a place, tormented by the reality of today. Because there is still citizen who not only do they keep standing but also find the strength to create.
Together	Maria Milkoglou	Maria Milkoglou and her cheerful team explore the nightlife, entertainment and commercial activities of the area, as well as the worlds of fashion, beauty, technology and the Internet.
Historical Facts	Kostas Papakosmas	Kostas Papakosmas, with his vast journalistic experience and his love for history, discuss the most significant historical facts of the area.
Recite	Thanasis Dialektopoulos	Distinguished historian Thanasis Dialektopoulos narrates the history of Eastern Macedonia from antiquity and into different eras. Following a scientific approach with documentation and arguments, he recounts the ancient history in a manner the viewers can understand.
Journeys in flavors	Kika Ovaliadou, Nena Koukounari	Kika Ovaliadou and Nena Koukounari take us on a journey to enchanting destinations where they discover tastes, smells and aromas, through local recipes and products.
Attendances	Stella Maronitou	Stella Maronitou discusses issues that concern the family, society, politics, life and health, as well as subjects about theatre, entertainment, beauty and fashion.
Hidden Treasures	Maria Papazoglou	Maria Papazoglou welcomes as guests people who have studied the history, the tradition and the culture of our area. Learn about the unique sight attractions, alternative tourism suggestions, the cuisine, the products and the hidden treasures of the area.
We go on vacation	Diogenes Charalambidis	Diogenes Charalambidis guides to beautiful sceneries, so that we're off to holidays. Get introduced to the best summer and winter get-away destination spots, with their sights, entertainment suggestions, lodging options and dining choices.
7 Days with Fani	Fani Aspogali	Society, culture, family, health, beauty, market ... Fani Aspogali presents a variety of issues on this fresh TV program with an optimistic point of view, in order to inform and entertain.
Imam Baildi	Diogenes Charalambidis	A cheerful and hilarious approach to our local society through the witty point of view of Diogenes Charalambidis.
For A Prettier Life	Yiannis Soubekas	Through the experience, skills, knowledge and the talent of Yiannis Soubekas, everyday women experience a true and dreamy make-over in their appearance.
People	Evangelia Deligianni	Focusing on the people and their actions, Evangelia Deligianni presents the admirable accomplishments of individuals from the municipality of Eastern Macedonia and Thrace. People who stood out became creative, offered hope, crossed boundaries and managed to end up winners.
ENA Sport	Costas Loukoumis	Weekly developments in athleticism in the district for sports lovers. Rich coverage, witty commentary, selected guests and highlights from all the popular sports promise to win over even the most demanding viewers.
