= Blue Sky (TV channel) =

- Country: Greece
- Broadcast area: Attica, Argosaronikos, central & southern Evia, northwestern Cyclades, Kythira, Boeotia and parts of Peloponnese
- Headquarters: 55 Evripidou and Kanari, Irakleio, Attica

Programming
- Language(s): Greek
- Picture format: 4:3 (576i, SDTV)

Ownership
- Owner: General Radio and Television Enterprises S.A.

History
- Founded: 20 May 1992
- Launched: November 1990

Links
- Website: blueskytv

Availability

Streaming media
- Blue Sky TV: Live TV

Blue Sky is a Greek, private regional television station. It started operating in November 1990. It broadcasts digitally from Ymittos, Parnitha and Aegina, covering the region of Attica.

Its program includes informative, educational programs as well as telesales and is the first regional television station that broadcast a digital signal from the region of Aegina.

== Informative and entertaining shows ==
On February 1, 2010, Terence Quick undertook the presentation of the main bulletin on the television station for 6 months at the end of his collaboration with the state television ET3. After the journalist left the station, the position was filled by Emi Livaniou despite the information that she was in discussions with the management of ERT.

Vefa Alexiadou presented a daily show at the station after the termination of the contract with Alter Channel, in October 2010.

The informative show "Bulletin 11" is presented by the former journalist of ERT and head of the press office of the Greek Embassy in Belgrade and Moscow, Spyros Chatzaras, often occupying the news with intolerant messages against immigrants and antisemitism theories. Since March 2015, the station's news bulletin is presented by Lina Klitou.

Many names passed through the station such as Takis Spiliopoulos, Leonidas Karpenarakos, George Vlachos, Yiannis Loverdos, Akis Pavlopoulos, Yiannis Papadopoulos, Anna Triantafyllia Tsoutsa and Nena Ouzounidou.

=== Date with the Current Affairs ===
This program was started by the late journalist Giorgos Zervos and from 2015 to 2019 it was presented by Yiannis Loverdos. From this year until today, it is presented by Yiannis Kanellakis and Gavrilos Chalkiotis.

=== Interventions ===
From September 2014 until July 2019, journalist Akis Pavlopoulos presented a news program called Interventions, in the night zone of the station, while he also presented the show for the parliamentary elections of 2019. From September 2019 until July 2020, the show was presented by journalist Giannis Papadopoulos. From September 2020 until January 2021 it was presented by Lina Kleitou while from January 2021 until today it is presented by journalist Sotiris Xenakis.

=== Personal Data ===
The journalist and writer Kostas Mardas presents the show "Personal Data" hosting whenever important figures such as Takis Soukas, Dimos Moutsis, Takis Fotopoulos, George Stathopoulos, Dimitris Mytaras, Lina Nikolakopoulou etc.

=== Monday's Trial ===
Great publicity and a storm of reactions for weeks was created by the complaints of the veteran referee Sotiris Vorgias on the show "Monday's Trial", leaving hints, among other things, about the credibility of some referees and the complaints of the criminologist Alexis Kougias with the same show to make revelations through recorded cassettes involving major players of Greek PAE and referees for "set up" games while the former referee Sotiris Vorgias mentioned that in the contents of the cassettes he recognized the voice of the president of the Hellenic Football Federation Sophocles Pilavos with an ignoramus.

== Ownership ==
The channel is owned by the General Broadcasting Company S.A., which was established on May 20, 1992, with its initial headquarters in Filothei. On March 20, 1998, the channel's operation was legalized under the 6446/Ε license, by the Ministry for the Press, while two years later moved its headquarters to Irakleio, Attica.
