= Duck TV =

ducktv
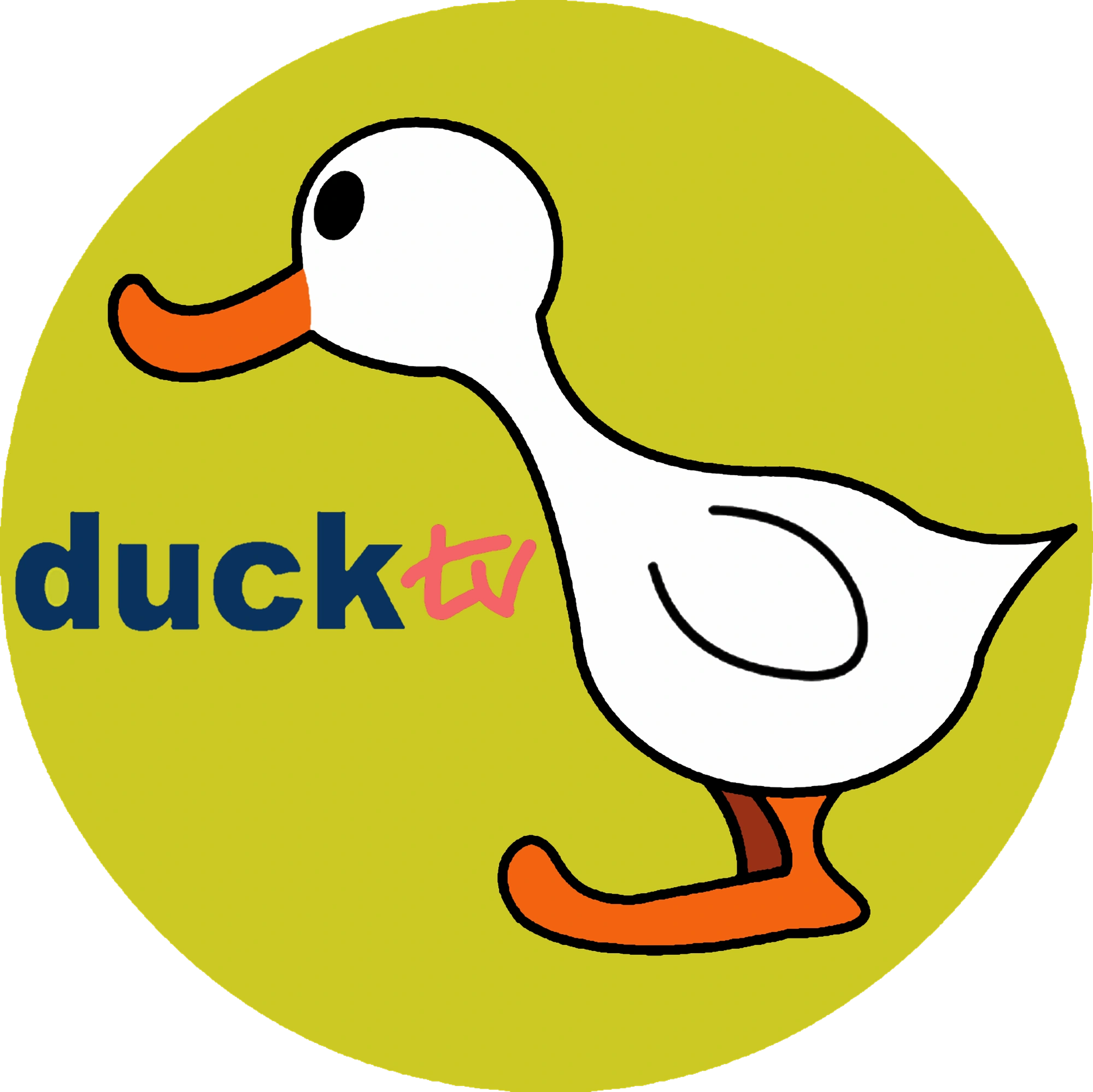
- Country: Slovakia
- Broadcast area: Worldwide

Ownership
- Owner: WICKS Communications (2007–2011); SlovWest (2011–2014); Mega Max Media s.r.o. (2014–present)

History
- Launched: October 2007 (as Bebe TV); January 2011 (As ducktv)
- Former names: Bebe TV (2007–2011)

Links
- Website: ducktv.tv

Availability

Streaming media
- Canal Digitaal Live App: Watch Live

Duck TV (stylised ducktv) is a children's television channel which was launched in October 2007 as Bebe TV on UPC and was owned by WICKS Communications, and available in Spain, Romania, Hungary, Slovakia and Czech Republic. In January 2011 it became Duck TV and its ownership was acquired by SlovWest.
