= Grava school complex =

Coordinates: 38.013°N 23.741°E

- Σχολικό Συγκρότημα Γκράβας

Location
- Passov, G. Hatzidakis and Taygetou streets Athens, Greece

Information
- Type: School complex
- Campus type: Urban
- Sports: Basketball, volleyball, athletics, swimming

The Grava school complex (Greek: Σχολικό Συγκρότημα Γκράβας) in Athens, is one of the largest school complexes in Greece, where 24 different schools are located, from kindergartens to high schools.

== Location ==
A Grava school

It is located in the northern section of the Municipality of Athens, near the areas of Kypriadou and Perivolia, as well as being on the borders with Galatsi. More specifically, it is surrounded by the streets of Passov (Πασσώβ), G. Hatzidakis (Γ. Χατζηδάκη) and Taygetou (Ταϋγέτου).

On the external grounds of the complex, several sports facilities exist under the name of the Antonis Tritsis Athletic Center, such as basketball and volleyball courts, tracks, gymnasium and swimming hall.

== Schools ==
The complex houses kindergartens (Νηπιαγωγείο), elementary schools (Δημοτικό Σχολείο), middle schools (Γυμνάσιο), high schools (Λύκειο) and professional institutes, under the supervision of the municipalities of either Athens or Galatsi.

=== Kindergartens ===
- 38th Athens Kindergarten (38ο Νηπιαγωγείο Αθηνών)
- 62nd Athens Kindergarten (62ο Νηπιαγωγείο Αθηνών)
- 81st Athens Kindergarten (81ο Νηπιαγωγείο Αθηνών)
- 113th Athens Kindergarten (113ο Νηπιαγωγείο Αθηνών)

=== Elementary schools ===
- 46th Athens Elementary School (46ο Δημοτικό Σχολείο Αθηνών)
- 65th Athens Elementary School (65ο Δημοτικό Σχολείο Αθηνών)
- 112th Athens Elementary School (112ο Δημοτικό Σχολείο Αθηνών)
- 132nd Athens Elementary School (132ο Δημοτικό Σχολείο Αθηνών)

=== Middle schools ===
- 2nd Galatsi (2ο Γυμνάσιο Γαλατσίου)
- 1st Galatsi (1ο Γυμνάσιο Γαλατσίου)
- 40th Athens (40ό Γυμνάσιο Αθηνών)
- 22nd Athens (22ο Γυμνάσιο Αθηνών)
- 21st Athens (21ο Γυμνάσιο Αθηνών)
- 61st Athens (61ο Γυμνάσιο Αθηνών)

=== High schools ===
- 2nd Galatsi (2ο Ενιαίο Λύκειο Γαλατσίου)
- 1st Galatsi (1ο Ενιαίο Λύκειο Γαλατσίου)
- 40th Athens (40ό Ενιαίο Λύκειο Αθηνών)
- 21st Athens (21ο Ενιαίο Λύκειο Αθηνών)
- 61st Athens (61ο Ενιαίο Λύκειο Αθηνών)

=== Technical vocational schools ===
- 1st Galatsi (1ο Τ.Ε.Ε. Γαλατσίου)
- 2nd Galatsi (2ο Τ.Ε.Ε. Γαλατσίου)
- 3rd Galatsi (3ο Τ.Ε.Ε. Γαλατσίου)

=== Vocational institutes ===
- Galatsi IEK (Ι.Ε.Κ. Γαλατσίου)

== See also ==
- Education in Greece
