= TV 100 =

TV 100 is the first non-state TV station in Greece. It was founded in 1988 by the then mayor of the city Sotiris Kouvelas, who served as mayor until 1989 and a year later, he founded TV station with national coverage in Athens, the New Channel / Tempo TV. These two channels have worked together for some time, exchanging programs and news bulletins.

Simultaneously with the launch of the TV 100, the Municipality of Thessaloniki aired for the first time in northern Greece several foreign satellite channels to alternative in the way we watched public television at the time, activity later followed the state broadcasting organization across the country. H range in the terrestrial transmission is limited only in the region of Macedonia but transmits digitally in Central Macedonia, spread nationwide through the platform of Cosmote TV either through satellite or cable or IPTV with Conn-X.
