= Center TV =

Center TV is the biggest regional television channel from Kavala and covers all the Eastern Macedonia and Thrace, Lemnos and eastern Chalkidiki. Founded in 1991 to the development of private television. The channel is aimed at informing the public of Eastern Macedonia and Thrace for the corresponding issues with 4 newscasts a day. But not only has information and telemarketing (telesales emissions) and children, etc. cooking shows On September 5, 2014, the channel has a new campaign because of the digital transition.

== Property ==
The channel owned property in Center Television S.A. and is jointly owned by ENA Channel S.A. after the two owners have the same reference number in accordance with Greek National Council for Radio and Television (6447/E/20.3.1998).

== Greenhouse ==
The most famous broadcasts of the channel are:

- On camera with John Komninos and Nick Tarapatsis (Daily 14:30-16:30 and recurrence 00:30-02:30)
- Center News with John Komninos, Eva Pasalidou, Elena Serefidou, Nikos Chatzigiovanakis (Daily 07:00-08:00, 20:30-22:00 and 23:30-00:30)
