= CreteTV =

CreteTV Κρήτη TV
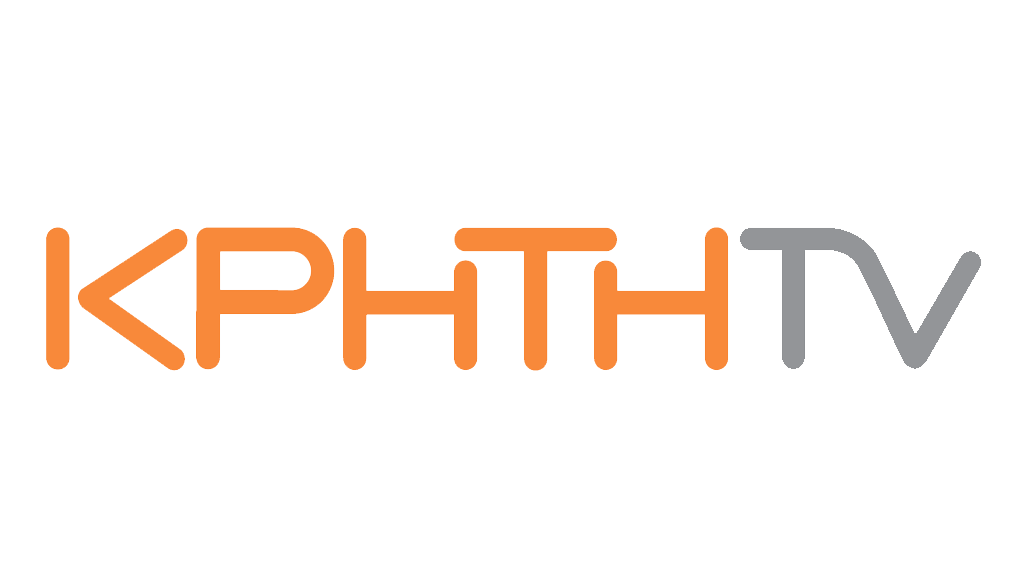
- Country: Greece
- Headquarters: Industrial Area (Block 9A), Nea Alikarnassos, Heraklion, 71601

Programming
- Language(s): Greek

Ownership
- Owner: Icarus Broadcasting Enterprises S.A.

History
- Launched: December 1990

Links
- Webcast: Live Streaming
- Website: Official website

Availability

Terrestrial
- Digea: 35 UHF (Chania); 44 UHF (Heraklion, Rethymno); 46 UHF (Lasithi)

CreteTV (Greek: Κρήτη TV, romanized: Kríti TV) is a Greek regional television station, based in Heraklion. Its terrestrial transmission covers the region of Crete, while it also transmits via satellite through the Cosmote TV and Nova network.
