= Makedonia TV =

- Country: Greece
- Broadcast area: National

Programming
- Language: Greek
- Picture format: 1080i HDTV (downscaled to 16:9 aspect ratio 576i for the SDTV feed)

Ownership
- Owner: Makedonia TV S.M.S.A. (Media Capital Partners Irish Collective Asset-Management Vehicle); 72.3% Antenna Group; 25.4% MBC Group; 2.3% Eurobank Ergasias
- Sister channels: ANT1; ANT1 Cyprus

History
- Launched: 1990; 36 years ago

Links
- Website: Makedonia TV

Availability

Terrestrial
- Digea: All over Greece at local frequencies

Streaming media
- ANT1 Plus: watch.antennaplus.gr

Makedonia TV (Greek: Μακεδονία TV) is a Greek private national free-to-air television channel broadcasting from Marousi, Athens and earlier from Thessaloniki, the capital of Macedonia in Greece. It was founded in 1991 by a group of journalists from the newspaper of the same name.

== History ==
Makedonia TV started broadcasting in 1990 as a local channel for Central Macedonia, based in Thessaloniki. While still being a regional station, it started broadcasting into Attica in 1994. In 1995, its license was converted from regional to national, thus becoming the only national television channel broadcasting from outside Athens. In 2000, Antenna Group acquired the channel. Since 2009, it was a charter member of the Digea platform, which is financed by the national private networks.

In 2016, the regulator approved a change in its format to an entertainment channel with no news programs. In 2017, six journalists working for the station were sacked as the station was in the process of becoming a sort of clone of ANT1, which was condemned by the Association of Newspaper Editors of Macedonia-Thrace. On the early hours of 2 August 2019, the channel left Thessaloniki and moved to ANT1's compound in Marousi. This was also criticized by labor unions in northern Greece.

On 1 August 2023, Makedonia TV and its sister channel ANT1 suspended transmission via Nova. Subscribers were authorized to connect their terrestrial tuners. The cause for the removal was a price dispute between terrestrial television companies and Nova, where Antenna Group reportedly suggested that it would have requested to pay three times the price regarding the contract that was expiring. Mega was also embroiled in a similar dispute.

== Programming ==
The foreign program includes a variety of series: comedy, drama, and action. It also features big heat series and feature films from the big production studios that broadcast daily; Sex and the City, Amores Verdaderos, Just for Laughs, Rookie Blue, Bold And Beautiful, La Tempestad, Mayday, In Treatment, Spartacus and many more.

From 3 September 2018, the network changed its programming which includes only foreign series and telenovelas.

=== Current ===
- Chicago Fire
- Deutschland 83
- Satisfaction
- Saving Hope
- Scandal
- Shades of Blue
- Sons of Anarchy
- Suits
- The Blacklist
- The Mafia Kills Only in Summer
- Top Gear

=== Former ===
Shows

- Kalimera
- m.esa ekso
- Thes de thes Thessaloniki
- Cine Club
- Banana Mix
- Kane Paixnidi
- LIP GLOSS
- m.aziptero
- TAKSIDIOTES
- Sound Box
- Koritsia gia Spiti
- Ena klik pio konta...
- Ola Kala (Gossip show)
- Derby (Sports show)
- My Moment
- H Poli Mou
- Gefseis Kai Oinos
- Ygeia
- Tenekes

Foreign series

- Amores verdaderos
- Bewitched
- Color Rhapsody
- Dinosaucers
- Family Guy
- Futurama
- Happily Divorced
- Harsh Realm
- Jumanji
- Just for Laughs
- Lady, la vendedora de rosas
- La Doña
- Las Estrellas
- La Patrona
- La Tempestad
- Malcolm in the Middle
- Reina de corazones
- Rookie Blue
- Santa Diabla
- Sex and the City
- Sky Dancers
- Space Goofs
- Spartacus
- The Bold and the Beautiful
- The Real Ghostbusters
- The Simpsons
- The Young Pope
- Thunderbirds
- Triunfo del amor
- Two Guys and a Girl

== Logos ==
2013 - 03.09.2018

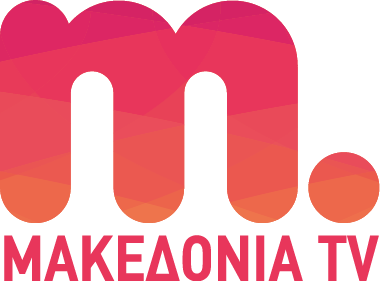
03.09.2018 - 31.07.2023

01.08.2023 - present
