= Digea =

Greek television system operator

- Type: Broadcaster (Television)
- Country: Greece
- Availability: Greece
- Owner: Digital Provider S.A.
- Launch date: 24 September 2009
- Official website: Official website

Digea is a Greek network operator that provides a digital terrestrial television system in Greece for seven national free-to-air channels (Alpha TV, Alter Channel, ANT1, Makedonia TV, Mega Channel, Skai TV and Star Channel). In addition to these free-to-air nationwide stations, the network is open to any other station choosing to use its services.

The name Digea is a word play in Greek: composed of the words "Digital" and "Gaea" (the Greek name for Gaia, the ancient goddess who was the personification of the Earth), literally translated as "Digital Earth". It symbolizes a union of the digital era and the basis for life in our world. The company’s main area of activity is the provision of networking and multiplexing services, both to the above-mentioned shareholders as well as to any legal entity opting to use the company’s services.

== History ==
Digea was formally announced by the private television networks in June 2009, with the first test broadcasts taking place in the late summer. The channels would broadcast using the MPEG-4 format. ERT's parallel service, still broadcasting on MPEG-2, would eventually upgrade to the new format.

== Time line ==
- 24/09/2009: The first digital broadcasting of Digea consisting of television stations Alpha TV, Alter Channel, ANT1, Makedonia TV, Mega Channel, Skai TV and Star Channel was carried out in the Gulf of Corinth from the transmitting site of Xylokastro.
- 14/01/2010: Digital broadcasting began in Thessaloniki - Central Macedonia from the transmitting sites of Chortiatis and Philippion.
- 18/06/2010: Digital broadcasting began in Athens - Attica from the transmitting sites of Hymettus and Aegina.
- 01/09/2010: Digital broadcasting of regional channels TV 0-6, Attica TV, Extra Channel, High TV, MAD TV, MTV Greece, Nickelodeon and Sport TV added in Athens - Attica from the transmitting site of Aegina.
- 19/11/2010: Digital broadcasting began in Alexandroupolis - South West Thrace from the transmitting site of Plaka.
- 08/02/2011: Digital broadcasting of regional channels Blue Sky, Channel 9, Kontra Channel and Teleasty added in Athens - Attica from the transmitting site of Aegina.
- 25/02/2011: Digital broadcasting began in Rhodes from the transmitting site of Monte Smith.
- 27/05/2011: Digital broadcasting began in Central Thessaly from the transmitting site of Dovroutsi.
- 09/12/2011: Digital broadcasting began in Northern Aetolia-Acarnania, Preveza and Arta from the transmitting site of Acarnanian Mountains.
- 03/02/2012: Digital broadcasting began in Patras and Southern Aetolia-Acarnania from the transmitting site of Aroi.
- 26/06/2013: Digital broadcasting began in Crete from the transmitting site of Malaxa and Rogdia.
- 27/09/2013: Digital broadcasting began in Messenia and Laconia from the transmitting site of Petalidi.
- 27/06/2014: Analog-to-digital full switchover throughout Peloponnese areas. Analog signal is due to shutoff and everyone who watches digital TV should retune their TVs.
- 01/08/2014: Analog-to-digital full switchover throughout Attica areas. Analog signal is due to shutoff and everyone who watches digital TV should retune their TVs.
- 05/09/2014: Analog-to-digital full switchover throughout Eastern Macedonia and Thrace area and North Aegean areas. Analog signal is due to shutoff and everyone who watches digital TV should retune their TVs.
- 21/11/2014: Analog-to-digital full switchover throughout Central Macedonia, Thessaly and Central Greece areas. Analog signal is due to shutoff and everyone who watches digital TV should retune their TVs.
- 19/12/2014: Analog-to-digital full switchover throughout Western Macedonia, Epirus and Ionian Islands areas. Analog signal is due to shutoff and everyone who watches digital TV should retune their TVs.
- 06/02/2015: Analog-to-digital full switchover throughout Crete, Dodecanese and Aegean Islands areas. Analog signal is due to shutoff and everyone who watches digital TV should retune their TVs.

== TV Channels ==
1. Alpha TV - private national television station
2. Alter Channel - currently off the air
3. ANT1 - private national television station
4. Makedonia TV - private national television station
5. Mega Channel - private national television station
6. Open TV - private national television station (formerly Epsilon & 902 TV television station, affiliated to the Communist Party of Greece, the television station along with the relevant broadcast license was sold by the party to a private company called A-Horizon Media Ltd, and hence no longer has any affiliation to the party)
7. Skai TV - private national television station
8. Star Channel - private national television station
9. Action 24 - private regional television station of Marousi - Attica
10. Alert TV - private regional television station of Tavros - Attica
11. ART - private regional television station of Kallithea - Attica affiliated to the Popular Orthodox Rally
12. Attica TV - municipal regional television station of Aspropyrgos - Attica
13. Blue Sky - private regional television station of Irakleio - Attica
14. Extra Channel - private regional television station of Peristeri - Attica
15. High TV - private regional television station of Athens - Attica
16. Kontra Channel - private regional television station of Tavros - Attica
17. MAD TV - private regional television station of Pallini - Attica
18. New Epsilon TV - private regional television station of Peristeri - Attica
19. Keedoo (former Nickelodeon) - private regional television station of Nea Ionia - Attica
20. One Channel - private regional television station of Athens - Attica
21. RISE TV - private regional television station of Irakleio - Attica
22. Smile TV - private regional television station of Rizoupoli - Attica

== See also ==
- Television in Greece
- List of radio stations in Greece
