= Oktonia =

Oktonia Οκτωνιά
- Community
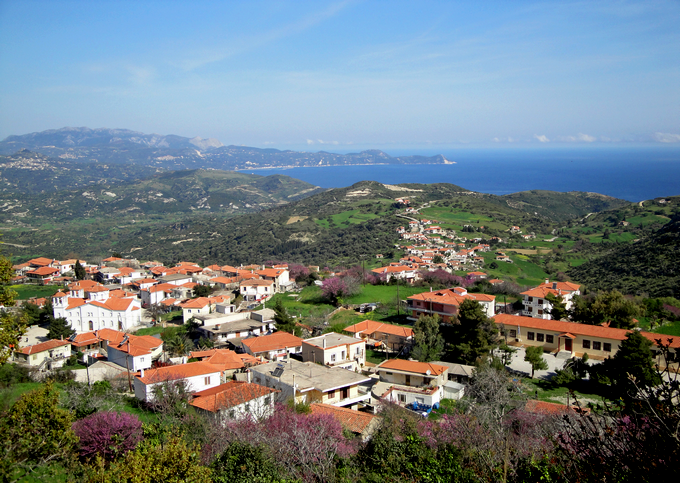

- Location within the regional unit

- Location within Greece
- Coordinates: 38°31′30″N 24°09′49″E
- Country: Greece
- Administrative region: Central Greece
- Regional unit: Euboea
- Municipality: Kymi-Aliveri
- Municipal unit: Avlon

Area
  - Community: 34.2 km^{2} (13.2 sq mi)
- Elevation: 385 m (1,263 ft)

Population (2021)
  - Community: 519
  - Density: 15.2/km^{2} (39.3/sq mi)
- Time zone: UTC+2 (EET)
  - Summer (DST): UTC+3 (EEST)
- Postal code: 34009
- Area code: 22230
- Vehicle registration: ΧΑ
- Website: http://oktonia.weebly.com

Oktonia is a hillside village found in the east-central area of Euboea Island, belonging to the municipality of Kymi-Aliveri, Greece. Located near the lower side of the Gulf of Kymi, the village is composed of four settlements: Alonia, Panochori (the upper village), Katochori (the lower village) and Panagia, covering a large area. It is 145 km from Athens, a distance covered in about 2.5 hours by car. According to the census of 2021, the community of Oktonia, which also includes the villages Agios Merkourios and Mourteri, has 519 permanent inhabitants.

== History and origins ==
The area of Oktonia has been inhabited since antiquity. The geographer Strabon (64 or 63 BC-c. 24 AD) wrote about Ochalia, a settlement apparently in the same location according to many scholars. Research indicates that there was a temple dedicated to Chthonia Demetra, the goddess Demetra who was the protector of the earth (chthon), and more specifically, agriculture and agricultural production.

From a compilation of historical data and traditional legend, it appears that during the late Byzantine Period, there was a village in the shadow of Kallimani Mountain just east of today’s village of Choreftaria. Groups of herders also grazed their flocks in the surrounding area. During this period, piracy was rampant; this village could not survive due to the fact that it was discernible to pirates from the sea.

According to tradition, one night during a festive gathering, when the watchtowers were unattended, pirates landed from the sea of Aili where their ships were moored. A woman who had perhaps learned of their plan, took her eight daughters and fled toward Kourvinou to escape the pirate raid. The rest of the villagers were captured and taken to the slave market in Anatolia. After some time, the mother and her daughters returned to the area but settled in a densely forested ravine at the foot of the mountain for protection from the pirates. Their initial settlement was on the site of present-day Panochori.

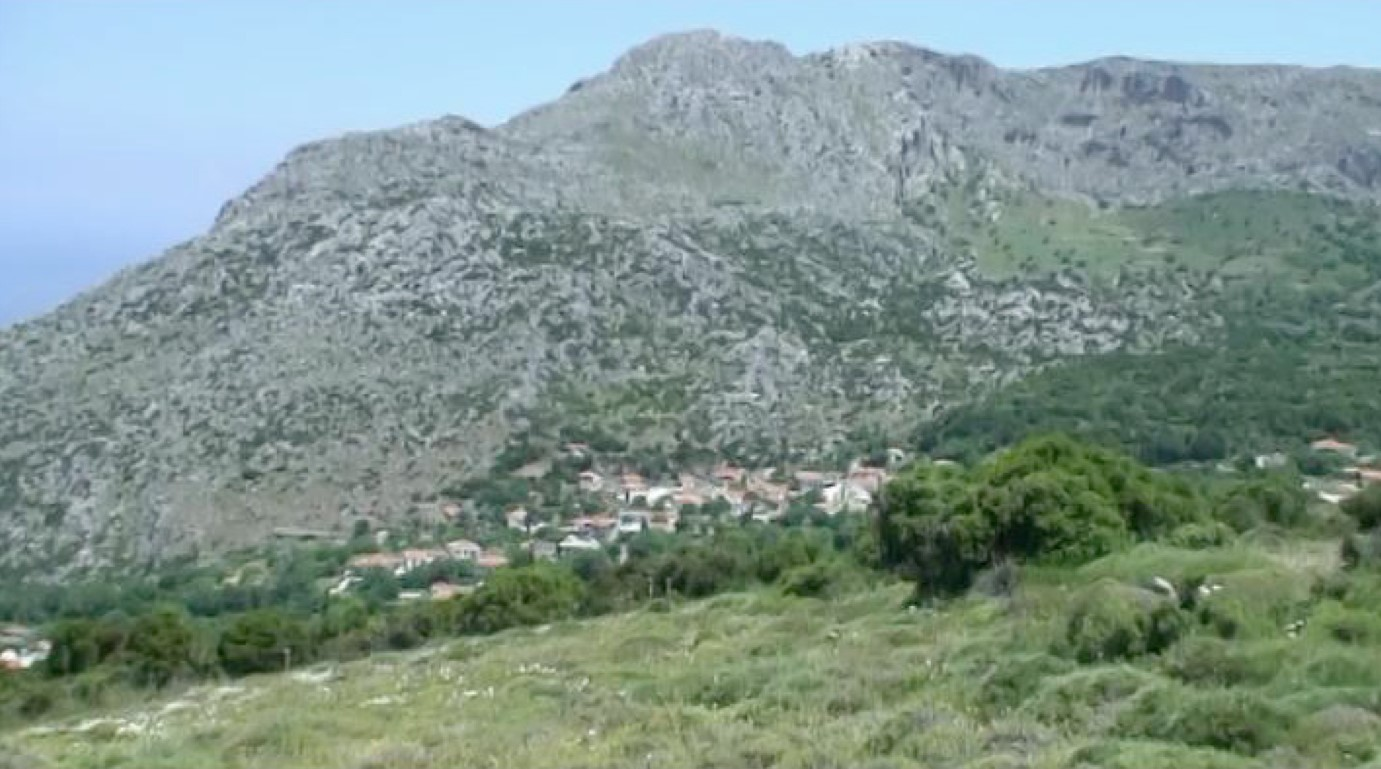
Rizovouni. This is the mountain where the village began.

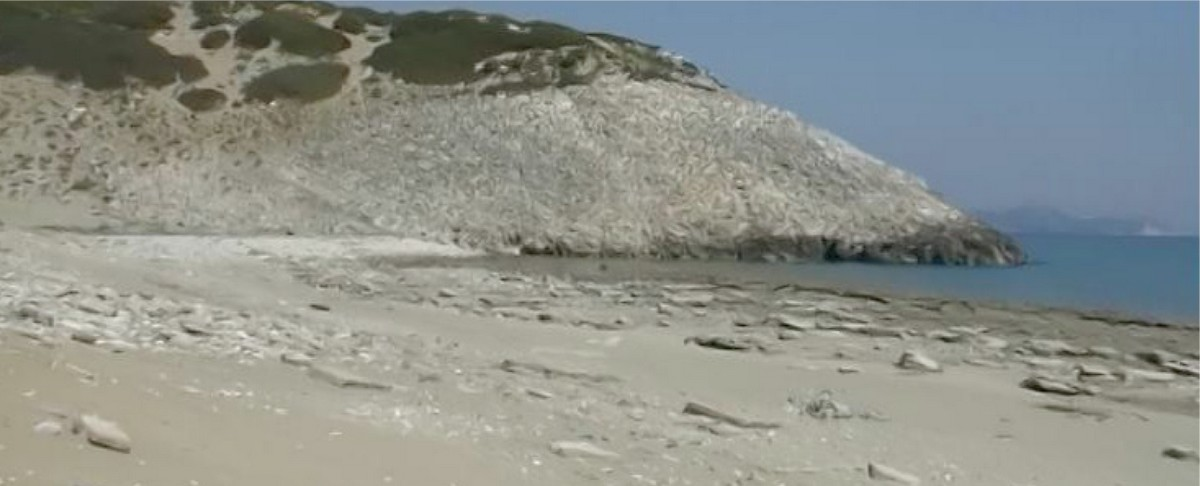
Pirates landed from the sea of Aili where their ships were moored.

Around AD 1420, a village was founded and named Oktonees and later Oktonia (okto is the Greek for eight), for the eight young girls (nees) who escaped the pirates and first settled it. Development of this settlement over the years created present-day Oktonia.

The inhabitants of Oktonia come from many areas of Greece: the islands, the Peloponnese, central Greece, Epirus, Karistos, Chalkida, northern Evia, Constantinople and Asia Minor.

During the Turkish Occupation, the local population found comfort in religion from their suffering and humiliation, and there were four monasteries founded by the mid-16th century. Today, from these monastery complexes only the churches survive: St. George at Koutsouro, the Taxiarches (Archangels) at Kotsikia, the Presentation of the Virgin at Papavlassa, and St. Demetrios of the Waterfall.

Of these churches, St. Demetrios of the Waterfall is most noteworthy because the monastery played a significant role in the years leading up to the revolutionary struggle of 1821. The church contains important examples of post-Byzantine painting. In 1921, by Royal Decree this church became a Prominent Monument of the State.

During the 1821 Revolution, many people from the village fought and died to attain their freedom. The mountainous terrain favored the resistance and, because of its struggle against the Ottomans, Oktonia experienced battles, a siege on the castle (Kastro), torture and massacres. The abbot of the Monastery of St. Demetrios, Paisios, was put to death by impalement.

Oktoniates (people from Oktonia) also demonstrated their courage, patriotism and self-sacrifice during the subsequent National Liberation struggles including the Balkan Wars 1912-13, the Asia Minor Expedition and World War II.

The history of Oktonia during this period was turbulent. The villagers suffered, were attacked, taken into captivity, and many were killed, but they demonstrated resistance, bravery, sacrifice, heroism and a will to survive. As a result of these experiences, the people of Oktonia became industrious, inventive, resilient, progressive, and persistent in achieving their aims.

== Oktonia today ==
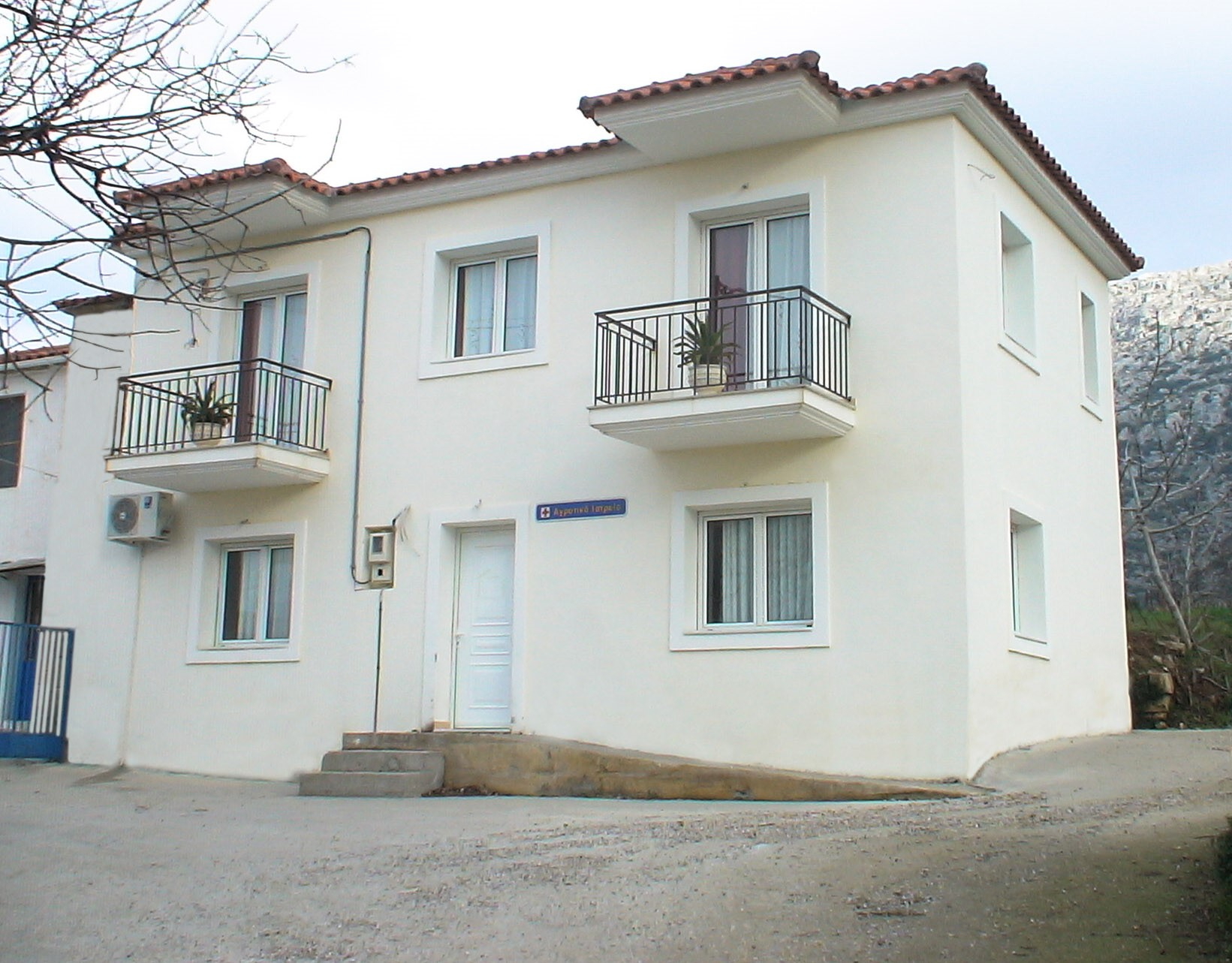
Community building

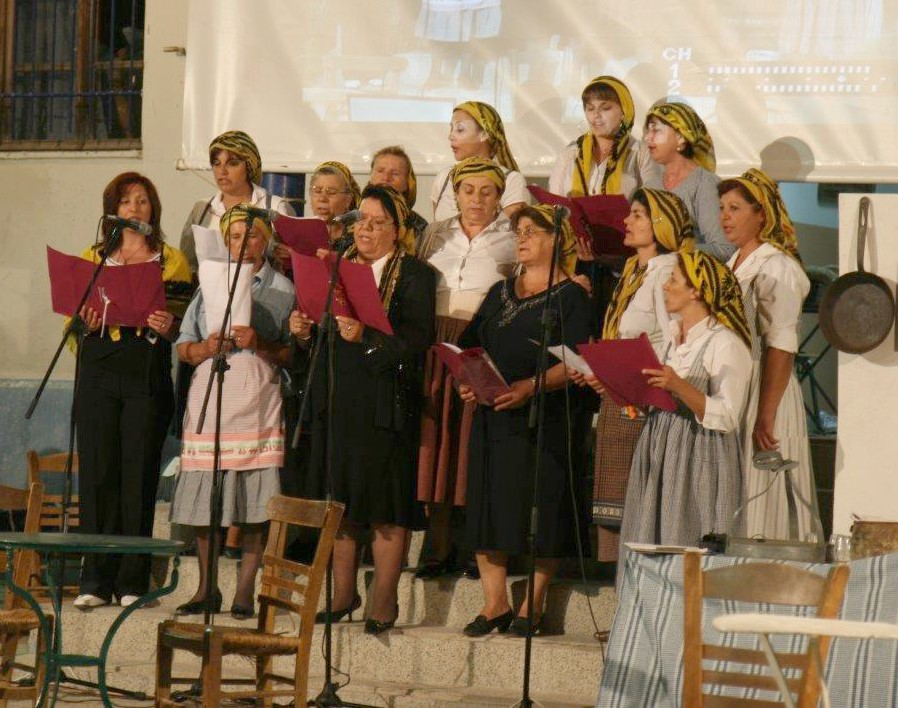
Cultural events

Today Oktonia is a large village of both new and renovated old houses with traditional tile roofs. Modern conveniences combine with age-old traditions in all aspects of village life. From the architectural standpoint, Oktonia is characterized as an Settlement with important structural and town-plan elements. These same pleasing elements are also found in the coastal settlements of Mourteri and Agios Mercurios.

The village people are engaged in many occupations. They are farmers, stock-breeders, fishermen, beekeepers, masons, artisans, clerks, laborers, sailors and shopkeepers.

There are two parish churches and a community center. The village has a primary pchool, 5 x 5 football field, basketball court, cafes, grocery stores, butcher shops, pastry & bakery shops, tavernas, bars and restaurants to meet the needs of residents and visitors alike.

In addition to the Agricultural Cooperative, there are several other groups and associations in Oktonia:

- The Association of Parents and Guardians of the Oktonia Primary School
- The Youth Association of Oktonia
- The Volunteer Fire Fighters of Oktonia
- The Worldwide Association of Oktonia, Zoodochos Pigi, which publishes a newspaper, "The Voice of Oktonia", and operates a Literary Book Club.

These organizations cooperate and assist each other in promoting the general welfare of the people. Individually and collectively, they host a number of cultural, educational, recreational and sporting events, without abandoning the village traditions.

== Geography and natural environment ==
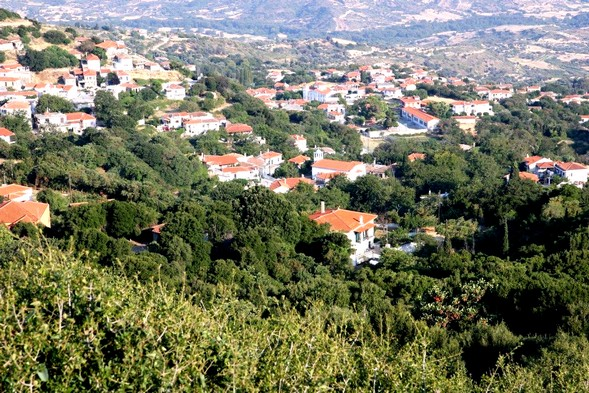
View of the village from the mount Kallimani

=== Geographical location ===
Oktonia covers an area of 34.2 km^{2} (13.2 sq mi). Below the Kallimani Mountain, which is still bare from the fires during Ottoman rule, the village lies amidst dense forest at an elevation of 400 meters. Oktonia overlooks the hill of Oksilithos, the plain, and neighboring villages and offers a splendid view of the Aegean Sea.

=== Climate ===
The climate of the village is mild, dry and healthy. Winter temperatures are not too cold and it is pleasantly cool in the summer due to the low humidity. The sea and land air are especially beneficial for people with respiratory conditions.

=== Agriculture, stock-breeding and fishing ===
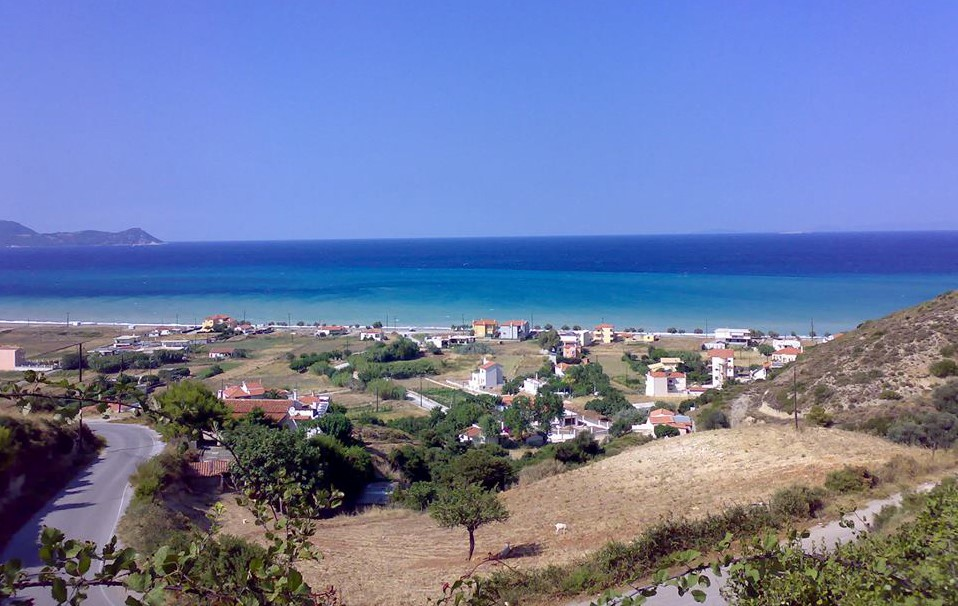
View on the way to Mourteri settlement.

Oktonia has a great deal of arable land and plenty of water, making it ideal for the cultivation of agricultural products. There are large olive groves and the primary products are olive oil and onions. The largest part of the village itself is in the midst of walnut and plane trees, among others.

Stock-breeding is widespread in Oktonia. Herds of goat and sheep graze the hills freely.

Finally, there are many opportunities for professionals and amateurs alike to fish the abundant seas in close proximity to the village. Beaches such as Bournia are frequented by local people and visitors.

== Interesting sites and leisure activities ==
=== Picturesque communities and their natural springs (fountains) ===
Scattered among the four settlements of the village are a number of ornate fountains, some old and others new, each with its own story. The best known are: Marinou, Sgourou, Skoura, Karvouniari and Mitsara in Panohori (upper village), and Voivonta in Alonia, Ambades in Panagia and Soor in Katohori (lower village).

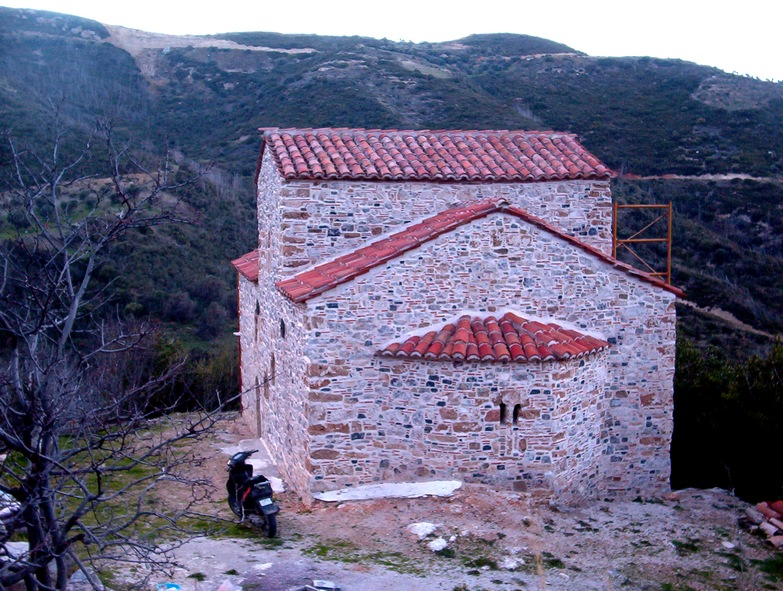
St. Demetrios of the Waterfall

=== St. Demetrios of the Waterfall ===
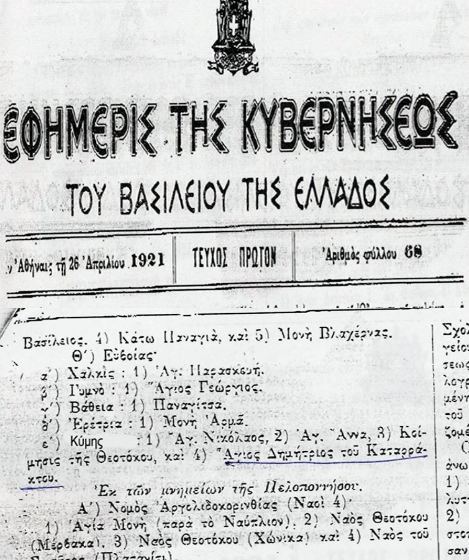
In 1921, by Royal Decree the St. Dimitrios' church became a Prominent Monument of the State.

The church remains today an important religious, historic and artistic monument. The monastery, which was located on the site, was a spiritual center inspiring freedom-fighters for the 1821 Revolution and also supplying the Greek Revolutionary ships that were in the sea of Markourio. This role in the Revolution resulted in the capture of the abbot of the monastery, Paisios, who was put to death by impalement.

The church interior is completely covered with extraordinary post-Byzantine paintings (1600), which depict a wide variety of religious themes in original, colorful compositions. It was deemed a Prominent Monument of the State by Royal Decree in 1921. As such, it took its place among the important Byzantine and post-Byzantine monuments of Greece such as the Monastery at Daphne and Osios Loukas.

=== Kastri and the historic castle (Kastro) ===
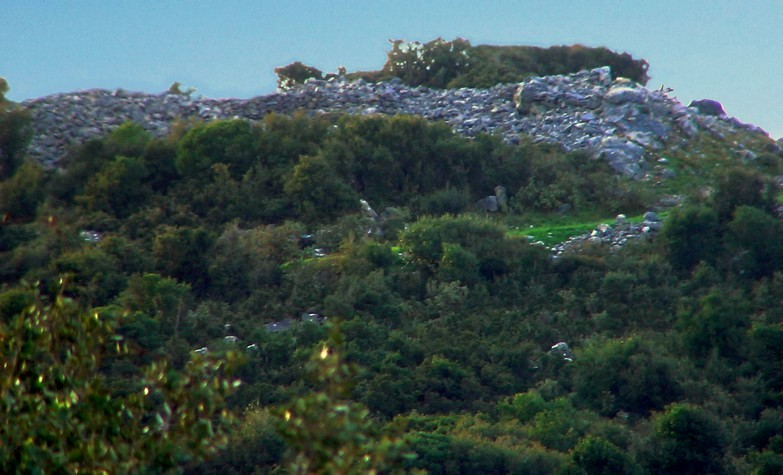
Kastri

On the slopes of the mountain of Oktonia, Kallimani, is the area of Kastri, which took its name from the medieval castle (Kastro) located on the mountain. From the Kastro all the other medieval castles in the area were visible: the Castle of Dragoneras, the Tower of Kipon, etc. All of these castles were able to communicate among themselves by lighting torches on their towers. During the years leading up to the Revolution of 1821, the people of Oktonia took refuge in these fortresses against the attacks of the Turks who were under the leadership of the Pasha of Karistos, Ontabassin. Following a treasonous act, the castle was besieged and bombarded. The women and children fled to other areas, the aged and the weak were slaughtered and the fighters escaped to the mountains in order to organize their subsequent revolutionary actions. In retribution, the Turkish fighters burned the monastery of St. Demetrios and the entire area around Oktonia.

Inside the castle walls is the Church of the Transfiguration of the Savior (Metamorphoseos tou Sotiros). On this site people sacrificed their lives for the cause of freedom. It has become a place of pilgrimage; visitors come for prayer, giving thanks, and glorifying God. Beside the church is a well fed by a cistern which gathered rain water to meet the needs of the people when the castle was under siege. From the castle, visitors have a panoramic view of Oktonia and the villages of Kimi. The castle can be reached by car.

In close proximity to the Kastro, on the side of the mountain facing Oktonia, is a cave four meters deep with an entrance three meters high. The approach to the castle may also be made by following a footpath which begins at Gorthia, a little below the Voivonta Fountain.

=== Byzantine and post-Byzantine churches (15th and 16th centuries) ===
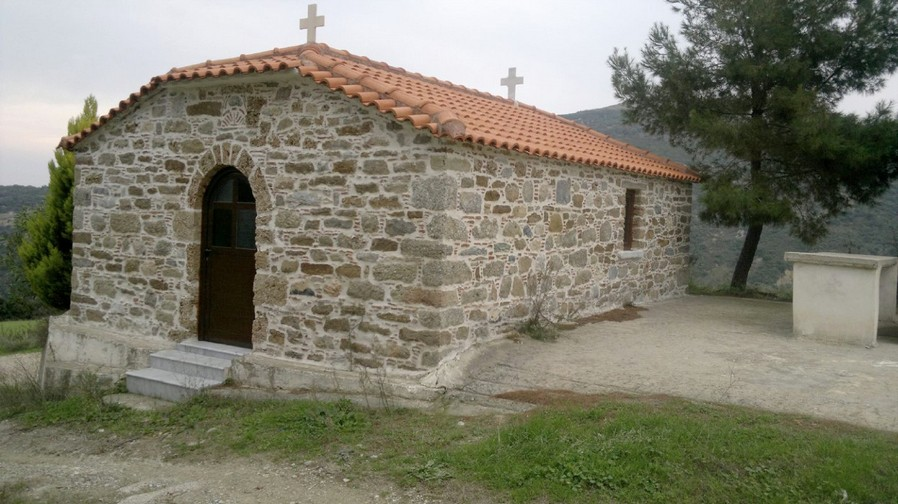
St. George at Koutsouro

St. George at Koutsouro, the Taxiaches (Archangels) at Kotsikia, the Presentation of the Virgin at Papavlassa and St. John the Theologian at Karvouni are noteworthy churches in the area.

=== New churches ===
There are about seventeen new churches scattered in various locations in the area. Of special interest among these churches are the historic church of Zoodochos Pigi in Tsouka and St. John the Baptist which is between Alonia and Panagia.

=== Beaches ===
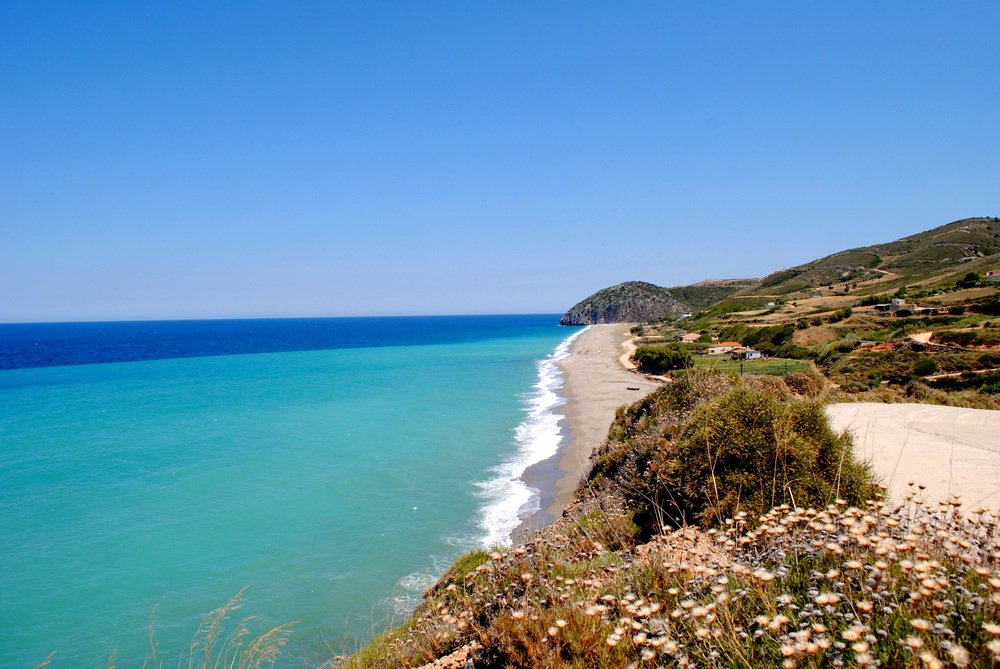
Agios Merkurios beach

Along the ten kilometer sea coast of Oktonia are the beaches of Mourteri, Agios Mercurios, Bournias, Graves, Limionari, Aili and Kalami.

=== Cape Punta sea caves ===
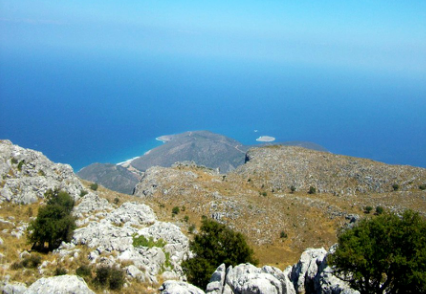
View from the top of mount Kallimani

Some of the caves along Cape Punta provided hiding places for people of Oktonia escaping the Turks. They waited for passing Greek ships to take them to other islands.

=== Mountain destinations ===
From the peak of Kallimani Mountain (elevation 750 meters) visitors have a panoramic view of the coast and the Aegean. Skyros and the Northern Sporades Islands can also be seen.

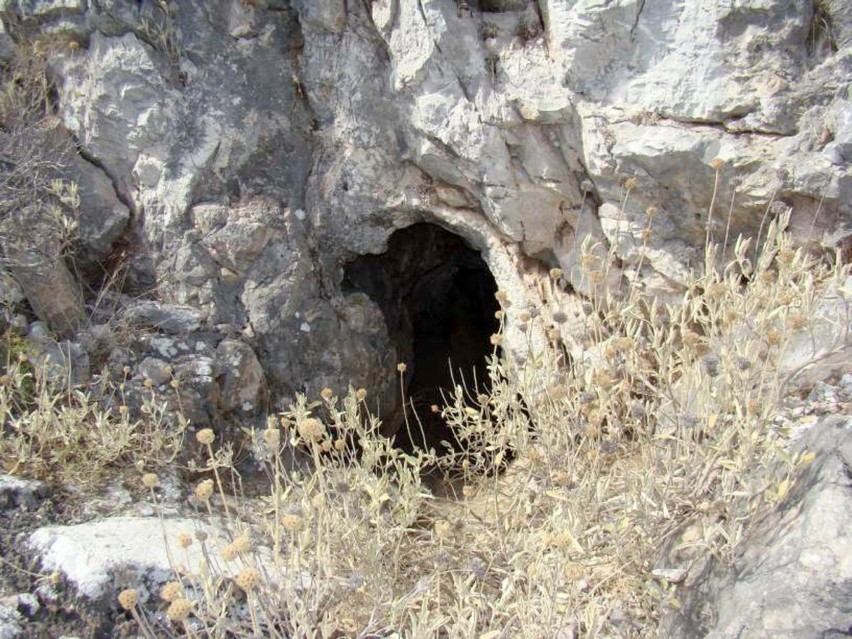
Boti's Cave (Tripa)

Botis Cave (Tripa) is in the area of Kakorrema (after Drimo) and has stalactites and stalagmites. It can be accessed by car, followed by a 15-minute hike. For the descent, a rope is required.

Around the top of the mountain of Kallimani there are other caves including:

1. The cave Agiasma or Graspilaia situated at Askala a short distance from Boti's Cave (Tripa). Finds here include ceramic objects and shards, and bones from the Proto-Helladic period (3200-2000 BC).
2. The Cave of Zoodochos Pigi is a small cave in the church yard in Tsouka. The icon of the Virgin Mary was found in the cave, and the church of Zoodochos Pigi was built to honor it.
3. The cave at Pigadi is relatively close to Zoodochos Pigis. It is a horizontal cave with an entrance two meters high, width of 60 centimeters and length of four to five meters.
4. The Cave of Bonou or Bonista is located 200 meters from the cave at Pigadi. It has a length of five meters and depth of ten meters. Research inside the cave yielded a few prehistoric shards and many shards from the post-Roman historical period (4th-5th c. AD).
5. The Cave of Bourboula is found on the northeast side of Kallimani Mountain at an elevation of 400 meters. The entrance has a width of five meters and maximum height of three meters. The cave was used seasonally as a shelter for herds of goats.
6. The Cave of the Transfiguration (Metamorphoseos) is found at Kastri (Kastro of Oktonia) near the church. It has a depth of four meters with an entrance three meters high. Research yielded shards perhaps from prehistoric times and from more recent periods. The cave was used in the past as a shelter for herds of goats.

== Sources of the original Greek ==
- Αρχείο Ευβοϊκών Μελετών της Εταιρίας Ευβοϊκών Σπουδών, τόμοι: ΚΓ’, ΚΔ’, ΚΣΤ’
- Ευβοϊκά- Ιστορία της Νήσου Ευβοίας του Ναθαναήλ Ιωάννου, Αθήνα, Μάρτιος 1969
- «Οκτωνιά, το ιστορικό χωριό της Εύβοιας», του Αναστασίου Σταμ. Μπουλή, Αθήνα 1991.
- «Αυτοψίες σε σπήλαια του Δήμου Κύμης-Αλιβερίου», Εφορεία Παλαιοανθρωπολογίας & Σπηλαιολογίας Νοτίου Ελλάδος, Αθήνα 14/10/13.
