= Nea Makri =

Town in Attica, Greece

Nea Makri Νέα Μάκρη
- Municipal unit
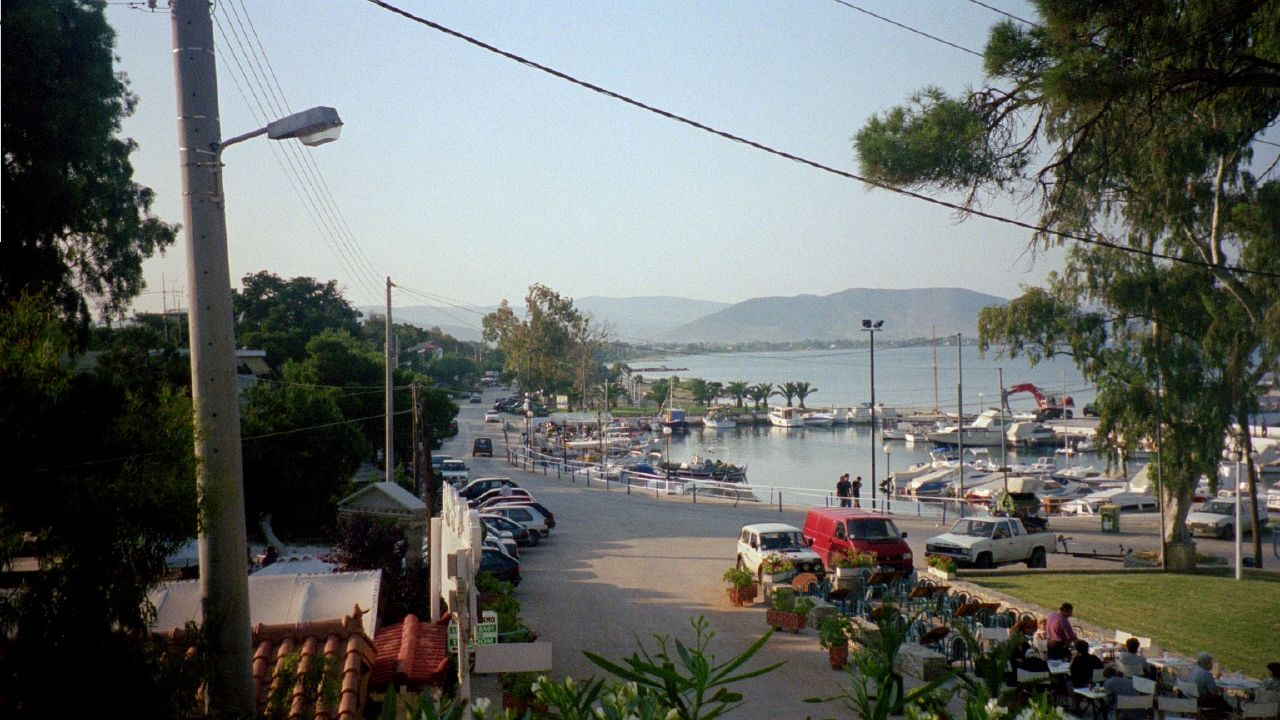

- Location within the regional unit

- Location within Greece
- Coordinates: 38°5′N 23°59′E
- Country: Greece
- Administrative region: Attica
- Regional unit: East Attica
- Municipality: Marathon

Area
  - Municipal unit: 36.662 km^{2} (14.155 sq mi)
- Elevation: 16 m (52 ft)

Population (2021)
  - Municipal unit: 18,114
  - Municipal unit density: 494.08/km^{2} (1,279.7/sq mi)
- Time zone: UTC+2 (EET)
  - Summer (DST): UTC+3 (EEST)
- Postal code: 190 05
- Area code: 22940
- Vehicle registration: Z
- Website: www.marathon.gr

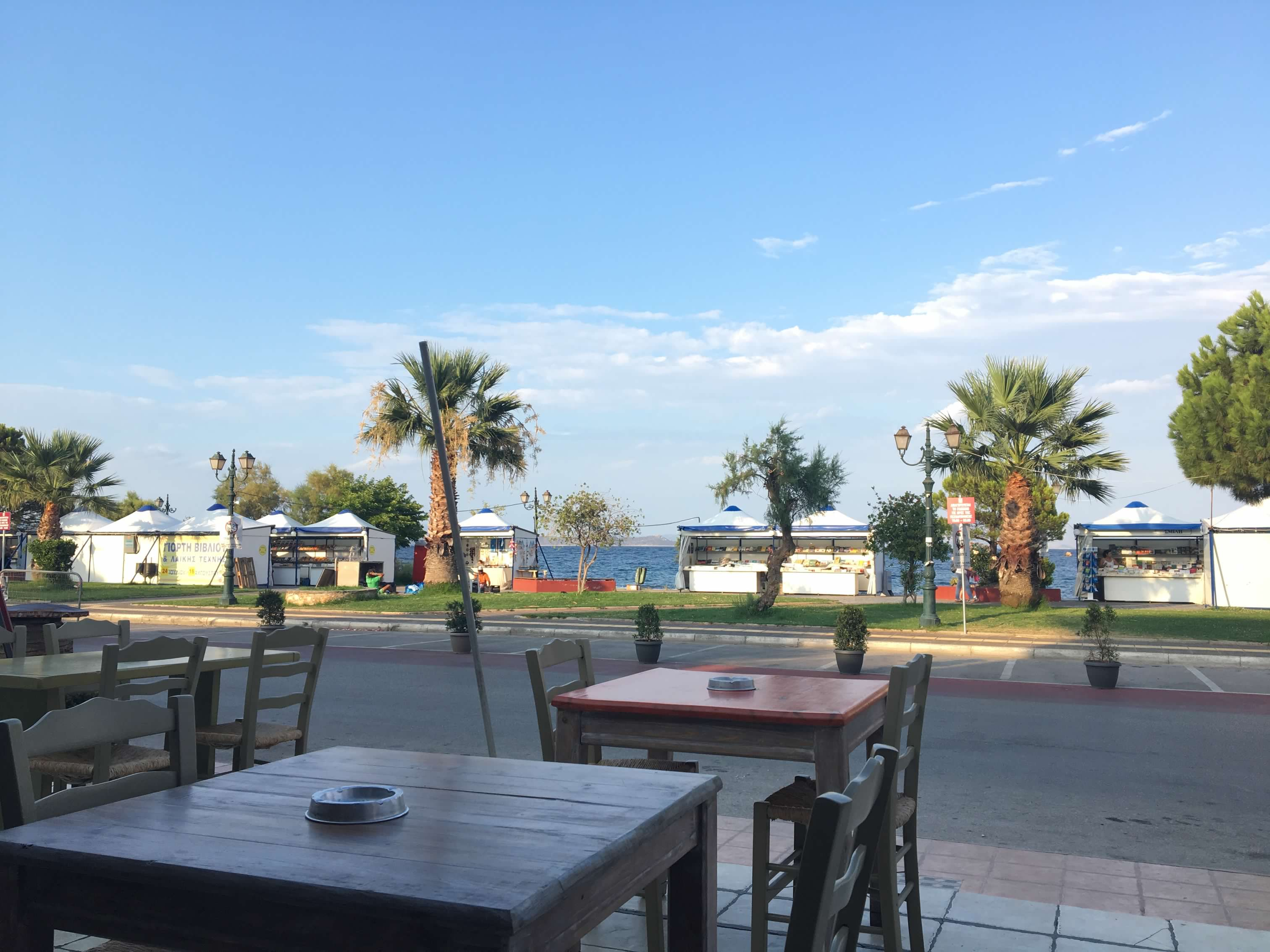
A view of the annual Nea Makri book fair in 2023

Nea Makri (Greek: Νέα Μάκρη) is a town in East Attica, Greece. Since the local government reform of 2011, it has been a municipal unit within the municipality of Marathon. The municipal unit has an area of 36.662 km (22.781 mi). It is part of the Athens metropolitan area.

== Geography ==
Nea Makri is situated on the coast of the Petalioi Gulf, a gulf of the Aegean Sea, in the easternmost part of the Attica peninsula. It is 7 km (4.3 mi) north of Rafina, 8 km (5.0 mi) south of Marathon and 25 km (16 mi) northeast of Athens city centre. The municipal unit Nea Makri also contains the village Neos Voutzas, 5 km (3.1 mi) south of Nea Makri town centre. Greek National Road 83 (Athens - Marathon - Rafina) passes through Nea Makri.

Popular locations near Nea Makri include Zoumberi Beach and the Brexiza Wetland. It is widely known and visited due to its beaches and coastline.

== History ==
The area was once known as Plesti, but following the 1922 Greek military disaster in Asia Minor and the subsequent expulsion of the native Greeks of Makri in Turkey, it was renamed Nea Makri (New Makri) by the refugees who settled there.

The United States Navy operated a HF radio communications base north of Nea Makri from the mid- to late 20th century. The transmitters were located further north, at Kato Souli. The call sign of the station was NGR. The American naval communications station was the deployment location for Naval Mobile Construction Battalion 133, home-ported in Gulfport, Mississippi.

Saint Ephraim the martyr was a monk who may have lived in the Monastery of the Annunciation in Nea Makri; it has become an important monastery in recent years and has become a site of pilgrimage for all Greeks.

== Population ==
Year	Town population	Municipality population
1981	8,516	–
1991	12,120	13,009
2001	13,986	14,809
2011	15,554	16,670
2021	16,906	18,114

== See also ==
- List of municipalities of Attica
