= Ymittos =

Ymittos Υμηττός
- Municipal unit
- Location within Athens

- Location within Greece
- Coordinates: 37°57′N 23°44′E
- Country: Greece
- Administrative region: Attica
- Regional unit: Central Athens
- Municipality: Dafni-Ymittos

Government
  - Mayor: Nikolaos Tsilifis (since 01/01/2024)

Area
  - Municipal unit: 0.975 km^{2} (0.376 sq mi)
- Elevation: 130 m (430 ft)

Population (2021)
  - Municipal unit: 10,455
  - Municipal unit density: 10,700/km^{2} (27,800/sq mi)
- Time zone: UTC+2 (EET)
  - Summer (DST): UTC+3 (EEST)
- Postal code: 172 36 & 37
- Area code: 210
- Vehicle registration: Z
- Website: dafni-ymittos.gov.gr

Ymittos (Greek: Υμηττός, romanized: Ymittós) is a town and a suburb in the Athens urban area, Greece. Since the 2011 local government reform it is part of the municipality Dafni-Ymittos, of which it is a municipal unit. With a land area of 0.975 km^{2}, it was the second-smallest municipality in Greece (after Nea Chalkidona) before 2011. It is situated 2.5 km southeast of the Acropolis of Athens. Ymittos has two high schools.

== Historical population ==
| Year | Population |
|---|---|
| 1981 | 12,491 |
| 1991 | 11,671 |
| 2001 | 11,139 |
| 2011 | 10,715 |
| 2021 | 10,455 |
