= Avlonas, Attica =

Avlonas Αυλώνας
- Municipal unit
- Location within the regional unit

- Location within Greece
- Coordinates: 38°15′N 23°42′E
- Country: Greece
- Administrative region: Attica
- Regional unit: East Attica
- Municipality: Oropos

Area
  - Municipal unit: 106.092 km^{2} (40.962 sq mi)
- Elevation: 120 m (390 ft)

Population (2021)
  - Municipal unit: 3,244
  - Municipal unit density: 30.58/km^{2} (79.19/sq mi)
- Time zone: UTC+2 (EET)
  - Summer (DST): UTC+3 (EEST)
- Postal code: 190 11
- Area code: 22950
- Vehicle registration: ZB-ZY

Avlonas (Greek: Αυλώνας, before 1927: Σάλεσι - Salesi) is a town and a former municipality in Attica, Greece. Since the 2011 local government reform it is part of the municipality Oropos, of which it is a municipal unit. The municipal unit has an area of 106.092 km^{2}.

== Geography ==
Avlonas is situated in the northwestern part of East Attica, at the northern edge of the Parnitha mountain range and 10 km south of the South Euboean Gulf coast. It is 30 km north of Athens city center. The A1 motorway (Athens - Thessaloniki) passes north of the town. Avlonas has a station on the railway from Athens to Thessaloniki. The municipal unit Avlonas also includes the village Asprochori (pop. 151). Avlonas has three pre-school facilities, one elementary school, one lyceum/middle school and one gymnasio/high school.

== Climate ==
Avlonas has a Mediterranean climate (Köppen: Csa) with strong continentality. The town experiences hot summers, cool winters and a wet climate by Attica's standards. The highest temperature was 46.2 °C and was recorded on July 26, 2023, and the lowest, −9.8 °C, was recorded on January 9, 2019. In August 2024 a new station from the National Observatory of Athens started operating in Avlonas while the old station was moved to another location in March 2025.

Climate data for Avlonas 110 m a.s.l.
Month	Jan	Feb	Mar	Apr	May	Jun	Jul	Aug	Sep	Oct	Nov	Dec	Year
Record high °C (°F)	25.3 (77.5)	25.9 (78.6)	29.3 (84.7)	33.4 (92.1)	38.1 (100.6)	43.9 (111.0)	46.2 (115.2)	44.6 (112.3)	40.6 (105.1)	35.4 (95.7)	28.9 (84.0)	25.8 (78.4)	46.2 (115.2)
Mean daily maximum °C (°F)	13.5 (56.3)	14.8 (58.6)	17.7 (63.9)	21.9 (71.4)	26.9 (80.4)	31.6 (88.9)	34.1 (93.4)	33.5 (92.3)	29.4 (84.9)	23.9 (75.0)	19.2 (66.6)	14.8 (58.6)	23.4 (74.2)
Daily mean °C (°F)	8.6 (47.5)	9.6 (49.3)	11.8 (53.2)	15.0 (59.0)	19.7 (67.5)	24.4 (75.9)	26.8 (80.2)	26.6 (79.9)	23.1 (73.6)	17.8 (64.0)	14.0 (57.2)	10.0 (50.0)	17.3 (63.1)
Mean daily minimum °C (°F)	3.7 (38.7)	4.3 (39.7)	5.8 (42.4)	8.1 (46.6)	12.5 (54.5)	17.1 (62.8)	19.4 (66.9)	19.7 (67.5)	16.7 (62.1)	11.8 (53.2)	8.7 (47.7)	5.2 (41.4)	11.1 (52.0)
Record low °C (°F)	−9.8 (14.4)	−5.2 (22.6)	−3.8 (25.2)	−2.6 (27.3)	4.1 (39.4)	8.5 (47.3)	12.9 (55.2)	13.8 (56.8)	6.3 (43.3)	1.6 (34.9)	−2.9 (26.8)	−4.2 (24.4)	−9.8 (14.4)
Average rainfall mm (inches)	107.0 (4.21)	85.8 (3.38)	88.1 (3.47)	48.9 (1.93)	48.4 (1.91)	40.8 (1.61)	19.2 (0.76)	59.8 (2.35)	48.6 (1.91)	85.4 (3.36)	144.1 (5.67)	136.0 (5.35)	912.1 (35.91)
Source: Meteoclub (Sep 2013-Feb 2025)

== Name ==
Avlonas (Greek: Αυλώνας) is sometimes called Avlona (Αυλώνα), however the masculine Avlonas is the correct form rather than the feminine Avlona. The ancient Greek Avlon (Αυλών) is also masculine. It appears that the name Αvlon is connected with the worship of Dionysus according to an ancient slab that was found in the area, dedicated to Διονύσῳ Αὐλωνεῖ (Dionysos of Avlon).

== Historical population ==
Year	Town population	Municipality population
1981	5,215	-
1991	6,346	6,441
2001	4,980	5,085
2011	5,744	5,895
2021	3,109	3,244

Avlonas has historically been an Arvanite settlement.
