= Anti-austerity movement in Greece =

2010–12 civil unrest over the government debt crisis and resulting policies

- Part of the euro area crisis and the impact of the Arab Spring
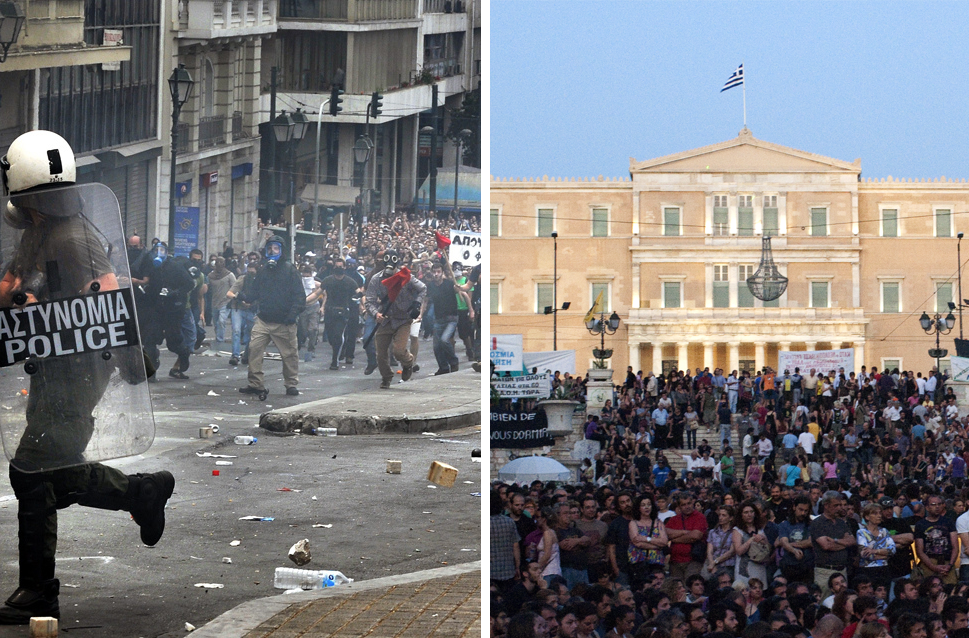
- A police officer flees rock throwers; a crowd assembles peacefully in Syntagma Square in front of parliament
- Date: 5 May 2010 – 18 October 2012 (2 years, 5 months, 1 week and 6 days)
- Location: Greece
- Caused by: Unemployment, inflation, corruption, Greek government-debt crisis, IMF presence in the country, harsh austerity measures with welfare cuts, bipartidism, particracy, democracy deficit
- Methods: Demonstrations, strike action, sit-ins, occupations, insurrection, civil disobedience, police violence

Casualties
- Deaths: 5 May 2010: 3; 20 October 2011: 1; 4 April 2012 : 1; 18 October 2012 : 1
- Injuries: 28–29 June 2011: over 270; 12 February 2012: over 40; 5 April 2012 : 1 (Marios Lolos)

The anti-austerity movement in Greece involved a series of demonstrations and general strikes that took place across the country. The events, which began on 5 May 2010, were provoked by plans to cut public spending and raise taxes as austerity measures in exchange for a €110 billion bail-out, aimed at solving the Greek government-debt crisis. Three people were killed on 5 May in one of the largest demonstrations in Greece since 1973.

On 25 May 2011, anti-austerity activists organised by the Direct Democracy Now! movement, known as the Indignant Citizens Movement (Greek: Κίνημα Αγανακτισμένων Πολιτών, Kínima Aganaktisménon-Politón), started demonstrating in major cities across Greece. This second wave of demonstrations proved different from the years before in that they were not partisan and began through peaceful means. Some of the events later turned violent, particularly in the capital city of Athens. Inspired by the anti-austerity protests in Spain, these demonstrations were organised entirely using social networking sites, which earned it the nickname "May of Facebook". The demonstrations and square sit-ins were officially ended when municipal police removed demonstrators from Thessaloniki's White Tower square on 7 August 2011.

On 29 June 2011, violent clashes occurred between the riot police and activists as the Greek parliament voted to accept the EU's austerity requirements. Incidents of police brutality were reported by international media such as the BBC, The Guardian, CNN iReport and The New York Times, as well as by academic research and organisations Amnesty International. The Athens Prosecutor agreed to an investigation into accusations of excessive use of tear gas, as well as the alleged use of other expired and carcinogenic chemical substances. As of 2011, the investigation was under way.

== Background of the 2010 events ==
In the early to mid-2000s, the government took advantage of Greece's strong economy by running a large deficit. As the world economy cooled in the late 2000s, Greece was hit hard because its main industries—shipping and tourism—were sensitive to changes in the business cycle. As a result, the country's debt began to pile up rapidly. The Government announced in late 2009 that it had racked up enough debt to be running a deficit of almost 13% of Greece's gross domestic product. This was worsened by Greece's problem with tax evasion among the country's upper middle and upper class, with the top bracket of households being responsible for 80% of total tax debt owed to the government. In early 2010 policy makers suggested that emergency bailouts might be necessary.

On 5 March 2010, the Hellenic Parliament passed the cost-cutting Economy Protection Bill. On 23 April, the Greek government requested that a bailout package offered by the European Commission and the International Monetary Fund be activated. The funds were expected to be available quickly, but it was unclear if they would be activated before a crucial 19 May debt rollover. On 27 April, Standard & Poor's cut the country's main debt rating to BB+ ("junk" status), increasing concern that a default might occur.

=== Austerity measures ===
On 1 May, Prime Minister George Papandreou announced a fourth round of austerity measures by the Greek government, described as "unprecedented". These include more public sector pay cuts, pension reductions, new taxes on company profits, an increase on luxury and sin taxes, and an increase of the Value-added tax. The proposed changes, which aim to save €30 billion through 2012, represent the biggest government overhaul within a single generation. The cuts are in line with the European Commission-International Monetary Fund loan proposals, which demand that Greece liberalise its economy. They helped Greece reach a loan agreement, announced on 2 May, for an immediate €45 billion in loans (with a 5% interest for the most part, provided by the Commission), with additional funds available in the future. The total value of the loans was expected to be in the €110 billion range. Papandreou submitted the bill to Parliament on 4 May.

The Hellenic Parliament was expected to vote on the proposed austerity measures on 6 May. New Democracy, the conservative minority party, vowed to vote against the bill, but the bill was expected to pass because of the Panhellenic Socialist Movement's large 160-seat advantage in Parliament. The government has pleaded with demoralised staff not to retire, fearing that a surge in benefits requests could further drain the public treasury.

In separate votes on 29 and 30 June, Parliament approved the austerity measures.

=== Relationship to the 2008 Greek riots ===
The 2008 Greek riots started on 6 December 2008, when Alexandros Grigoropoulos (Greek: Αλέξανδρος Γρηγορόπουλος), a 15-year-old student, was killed by two policemen in the Exarcheia district of central Athens. While the unrest was triggered by the shooting incident, commentators described the reactions as expressing deeper causes, especially a widespread feeling of frustration in the younger generation about the economic problems of the country (partly as a result of the 2008 financial crisis), a rising unemployment rate among young people and a perception of general inefficiency and corruption in Greek state institutions. Related sporadic protests continued into 2011 and beyond.

== 2010 protests ==
The chief motivator behind the anti-austerity protests appeared to be a deprivation type stimulus with actors, such as financial institutions and other foreign bodies such as the EU and Germany, being held accountable for the austerity policies implemented.

=== Before 5 May 2010 ===
On May Day, there were protest marches in Athens and Thessaloniki, by a number of unions, left-wing, anarchist and communist party supporters. Violent clashes broke out when riot police were sent out to contain the protesters.

On 4 May, members of the Communist Party of Greece broke into the Acropolis of Athens and hung banners: "People of Europe Rise Up".

=== 5 May 2010 strike and demonstrations ===
In response to the proposed spending cuts and tax increases, a nationwide strike was called for 5 May. Starting at midnight, aeroplane, train, and ferry traffic in and out of the country ceased. Schools, some hospitals, and multiple private businesses were closed. The demonstrations are seen by some as the most widespread since the end of the Greek military junta of 1967–1974.

An estimated 100,000 people marched through Athens, with some estimates stretching to 500,000. As protests gained momentum, a large group tried to storm the parliament building in Syntagma Square in Athens, where they scuffled with police, causing some of the Presidential Guard to flee from the Tomb of the Unknown Soldier. The protesters accused members of parliament of being "thieves". Riot police were able to push the crowds back with tear gas, flash bombs and smoke bombs. Nearby buildings, including a finance ministry building, were set on fire. Prime Minister George Papandreou responded "Nobody has the right to violence and particularly violence that leads to murder. Violence breeds violence."

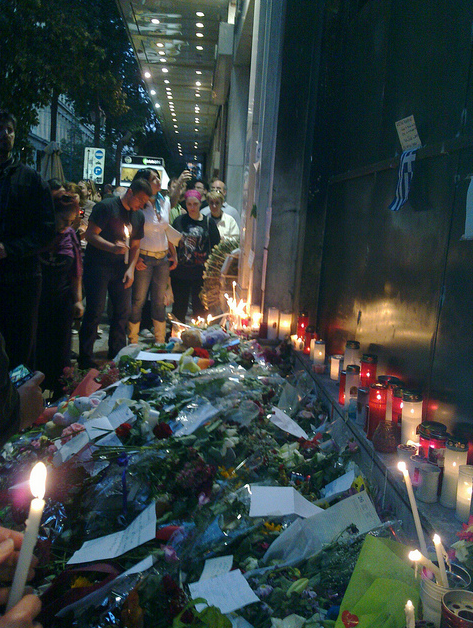
People paying their respects to the memory of the people who died on 5 May 2010 at the Marfin bank firebombing.

Protesters set fire to a Marfin Bank branch on Stadiou Street with Molotov cocktails; witnesses said that protesters marching past the bank ignored the employees' cries for help, while others chanted anti-capitalist slogans. Most of the bank's employees managed to escape the burning building, but two employees who jumped from the second-story balcony were injured and two women and a man were found dead after the fire was extinguished. It was reported that fire crews had difficulty reaching the scene because of demonstrations moving through the area. The victims died of asphyxiation from toxic fumes when they were unable to escape from a roof exit that was blocked. They had gone to work despite the general strike over fears of losing their jobs. They have been identified as Paraskevi Zoulia, 35, Angeliki Papathanasopoulou, 32 (who was four months pregnant), and Epaminondas Tsakalis, 36. Papandreou called the incident a "murderous act". Michalis Chrysohoidis, the Minister for the Protection of the Citizen, declared that "today is a black day for democracy...undemocratic forces have [latched on to] a peaceful demonstration of workers and now petrol bombs have killed three of our citizens and put an immediate danger to the lives of others." He also stated that "the killers will be caught and punished accordingly". Police started a widespread search, with the help of closed-circuit television footage to detect and arrest the suspects. The police blamed "hooded youth" for the incident, while one protester who spoke to BBC blamed police brutality for the escalation of violence which was started when protesters threw Molotov cocktails at police; the police responded with pepper spray and tear gas. In response to the incident, the Greek Federation of Bank Employees' Unions blamed bank management for inadequate safety measures in the building and called for strike action.

Elsewhere in Athens, some demonstrators threw rocks, bottles, and pieces of marble at the police. Trash bins were lit on fire. Some broke windows, threw petrol bombs, and committed other acts of vandalism. Other protesters set up barricades and burned cars. Across Athens, at least 12 people were injured, and more than 70 people were detained for questioning.

In Thessaloniki, 37 people were arrested as a result of the protests.

==== Aftermath of protest of 5 May ====
On 5 and 6 May 2010, the Hellenic Parliament passed the proposed austerity measures, claiming they show the Greek government's commitment to tackling its budget deficit, amongst continued protests.

Also on 5 May, the German parliament began debating the bailout package, as Chancellor Angela Merkel urged rapid passage. Merkel remarked that "Quite simply, Europe's future is at stake." The plan requires Germany to provide the largest share, €22 billion, of the bailout funds. The plan must be approved by 15 Eurozone countries in total.

Analysts said the protests could mark the beginning of protracted social unrest. If that occurs, the country could be pushed into deep recession. Economists have warned that it could be ten years before the Greek economy recovers, even if it does not worsen first.

There has been advocacy for a political coalition from within the Greek political elite, and by the Greek journalist Alexis Papahelas who said that Papandreou should 'get rid of some of the novices he has in his government, make an overture to the opposition and go full-steam ahead.'

One columnist at The Guardian suggested in an editorial that the protests speak of a deeper issue in Greek politics: she asks, 'What the advocates of this scenario [coalition government] do not seem to grasp is that the political class is out of touch with the population,' and 'How can we expect to see solutions and progress by the very same people who are inextricably, causally linked to the problem?' However other sources suggest that the movement was a positive reaction triggering a series of innovative socio-political processes.

== Background of the 2011 protests ==
The first round of austerity in 2010 failed to stop Greece's rising debt, which is expected to go up by 10% in 2011.

The memorandum signed between Greece and the IMF became largely unpopular in Greece, with some polls showing that 62% believe it was a bad decision. This memorandum came into action 7 October 2011. Amid accusations that the government has not achieved its goals according to the IMF memorandum, some countries in the European Union have stated that they will not be lending Greece any more money if the IMF does not do so, including the Netherlands, Germany and Sweden. Some EU officials went so far as to say that Greece should start selling its assets to other European nations to receive loans, and the Dutch Minister of Finance said that the Greek parliament would not like this proposal and characterised the opinion of the Greek parliament as "a sensibility" that no one can consider at this time. Meanwhile, unemployment exceeded 15%, while a large percentage of full-time workers only received the minimum wage of 592 Euros, or less. Rumours suggesting Greece's future exclusion from the Eurozone also added to frustration, but these were categorically rejected by the Greek government, the European Central Bank, the Bank of Greece and IMF-director nominee, and French Finance Minister, Christine Lagarde. On 29 June 2011, amid violent protests, the second austerity package was passed with 155 votes in favour in the 300-seat parliament. The next day, the Office of the High Commissioner for Human Rights of the United Nations reported an independent UN expert's warning that the austerity measures could result in violations of the Greek people's human rights, such as "rights to food, water, adequate housing and work under fair and equitable conditions". Meanwhile, other international media have questioned the necessity of a second austerity package, when the first one brought in no results.

When Greece signed the Memorandum with the European Union and the IMF in 2010, the matter of the constitutional legality of the memorandum came under criticism in Greece, both by the people and some of the country's most prominent university professors of law. The Athens Association of Lawyers, as well as a number of labour unions, brought the question of the legality of the memorandum to the Council of State of the Greek government, but the Council judged the contract to be constitutional in late June 2011.

Apart from the 2008 financial crisis, there was also a developing political crisis in the country. The European Commission asked the major parties in Greece to come to an agreement in regards to the new set of austerity measures, but twice the major parties failed. In a poll published on 29 May 2011, the two major parties (the ruling Panhellenic Socialist Movement and the main opposition New Democracy) gathered slightly under 40% of the total number of votes, with the ruling party having 19%, while the opposition came first with 19.5%. In another poll published the same day, the ruling party came first with 20.7% while the opposition came second with 20.4%. According to the polls, neither of the two parties could form a government, even if they combined forces. The lack of co-ordination within the government (with conflicting government officials stating opposing 'government positions') also fuelled the protests. When Maria Damanaki, European Commissioner for Maritime Affairs and Fisheries, stated that "our withdrawal from the Eurozone is on the table, we have to speak frankly" on 25 May, Greek banks lost liquidity equal to 1.5 billion Euro from withdrawals in two days. Meanwhile, the Minister of Finance, Giorgos Papakonstantinou, vehemently denied that exiting the Eurozone was being considered. On 1 June, the leader of the Popular Orthodox Rally party, Georgios Karatzaferis, announced that his party is considering resigning from parliament, thus causing the dissolution of the Hellenic Parliament and triggering national elections. He also commented that "I see a Prime Minister that is unable to react, an opposition that is unwilling to play the game, and a Left that is in its own little world".

== 2011 protests ==
=== February 2011 ===
On 23 February 2011, there was a recurrence of violent protests and strikes, involving up to 100,000 people as German Chancellor Angela Merkel called for a renewal of the loan programme to Greece that had been conditioned on fiscal tightening. The measures adopted by Greece were considered harsh by the protesters.

=== "Indignant Citizens Movement" (May–August) ===
==== May ====
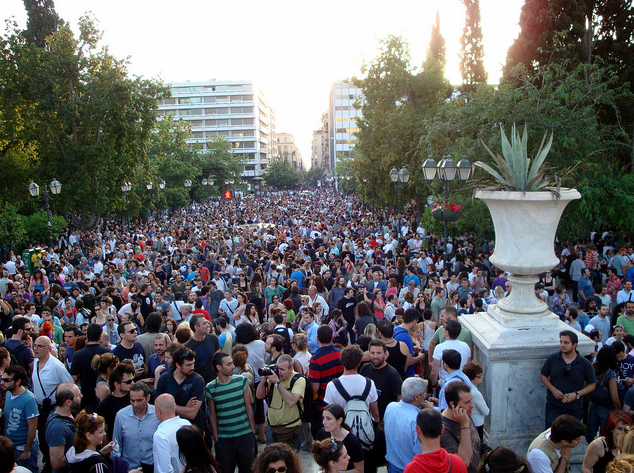
Demonstrators at Syntagma Square, the plaza in front of the Greek parliament, 25 May.

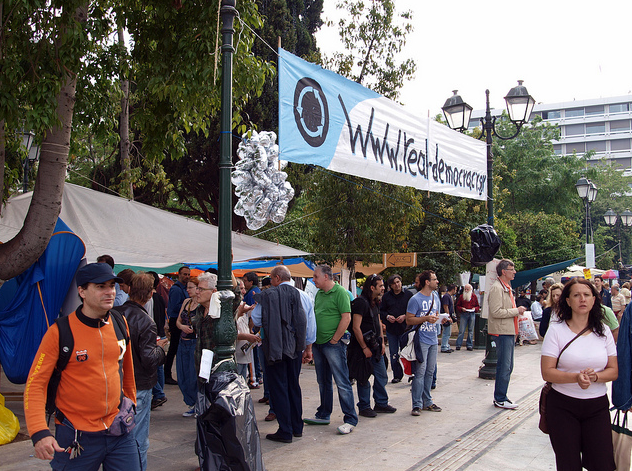
The Real Democracy Now! information kiosk at Syntagma Square, 31 May.

On 25 May 2011, peaceful demonstrations started in Athens and other major cities, protesting the new austerity measures proposed by the government, in the same spirit as the 2011 Spanish protests. The demonstrations include most major Greek cities: Athens, Thessaloniki, Larissa, Patras, Volos, Rethymno, Tripoli and Kalamata. The demonstration in Athens is coordinated by the Facebook page "Αγανακτισμένοι Στο Σύνταγμα" (Indignant Citizens at Syntagma). Currently, it is reported that over 90,000 people have registered on the page, and thousands (reportedly over 30,000) have gathered outside the Greek Parliament in Syntagma square. The demonstration in Greece's second-largest city, Thessaloniki, is co-ordinated by the Facebook page "Αγανακτισμένοι στον Λευκό Πύργο" (Indignants at the White Tower), and over 35,000 people have said they would 'attend' the protest. Some of the most popular slogans at protest on 25 May were:

- Error 404, Democracy was not found.
- I vote, You vote, He votes, She votes, We vote, You vote, They steal.
- Greece, your turn has come, you have to stop burying your children!
- Oust! (Greek interjection of a negative nature, meaning "leave")
- The maid resisted. What do we do? (Reference to sexual assault claims involving former IMF director Dominique Strauss-Kahn)

This series of demonstrations differed from almost all other demonstrations in Greece's metapolitefsi era (1975–present) in that it was a protest organised without political or trade union affiliations. Demonstrators who expressed political party affiliation during the demonstrations were condemned by the majority of the demonstrators, as the organizers claimed that there was no room for political affiliation or violence in the demonstrations. The focus of the protesters was against the government and the current driving forces of Greek politics, and the International Monetary Fund. As a response to the Spanish slogan "Be quiet, the Greeks are sleeping," (which was allegedly heard at the 2011 Spanish protests), a big banner was raised in front of the Spanish embassy in Athens reading "¡Estamos despiertos! ¿Que hora es? ¡Ya es hora de que se vayan!" (We've woken up! What time is it? It's time they left!). There was also a strong sense of disapproval for the Prime Minister of Greece, George Papandreou, and the vice-president of the government, Theodoros Pangalos.

The demonstrations continued nationwide for a second day on 26 May. Despite heavy rainfall in central Athens, reportedly over 14,000 people gathered in front of the Greek parliament for a second day in a row. The media reported that half of the people gathered at Syntagma Square in Athens were youth, whereas the other half were over 40, including families and children. In line with the Spanish quote of "Be quiet, the Greeks are sleeping" which triggered the Greek protests, two new banners appeared, one in French (Silence! Les Français dorment! Ils revent de '68, Silence! The French are sleeping! They are dreaming of May '68) and one in Italian (Zitti che svegliamo gli Italiani... Be quiet, you will wake up the Italians...). An information center and a "book of ideas" was also been set up at Syntagma Square. Additionally, a number of people were banging pots and pans. In Thessaloniki, Greece's second city and second-largest center of demonstrations, the protesters hung a huge "For Sale" sign from the city's main landmark, the White Tower, as a protest against the government's massive denationalisation schedule, which they perceived as "selling away our country's assets". Although the demonstrations in Thessaloniki were visibly smaller on 26 May, with around 2,500 people participating, competing with a major football game between the city's two major teams and the shops and markets open until late that evening. Some people set up encampments. In Thessaloniki's protests there was a sense of direct democracy, as citizens were free to take the floor and speak, voice their concerns and opinions, and contribute ideas about what should be done next, receiving the full attention of the other demonstrators.

The first vote of the people's assembly of Syntagma Square.

Demonstrations continued for a third consecutive day on 27 May. Thousands of people gathered in front of the Greek parliament, again in heavy downpour, joined by the "I'm Not Paying" movement. As a means of protesting, people wearing white masks formed a human shield around the Tomb of the Unknown Soldier, in Syntagma Square. On 27 May, the proceedings of the first people's assembly on Syntagma Square were published by the Real Democracy Now! movement. Among them:

- Any corrupt politician should either be sent home or to jail.
- When we, the people, start discussions without fear, fear grips them, inside the parliament building.
- This is not just the politician's fault. It's all our faults, with our selfish attitudes.
- Demonstrations should take place every evening at 6 pm and an assembly at 9 pm.
- Their democracy guarantees neither Justice nor Equality.
- The taxation system is not the same for the rich and the poor. Equal rights for everyone.

On 28 May, demonstrations continued with at least 7,000 people gathered in front of the Greek parliament. A number of new flags appeared, including those of Tunisia, Argentina, Armenia and Hungary. At least 20 people set up tents in the square. Major demonstrations also took place in Thessaloniki, Patras and Heraklion. In Thessaloniki a cycling race was organised as part of the demonstration. All across the country the movement was becoming more organised, media reported, with teams of doctors, translators, and food supplies set up by the protesters, especially at Syntagma Square, which had turned into the main protest center for the country.

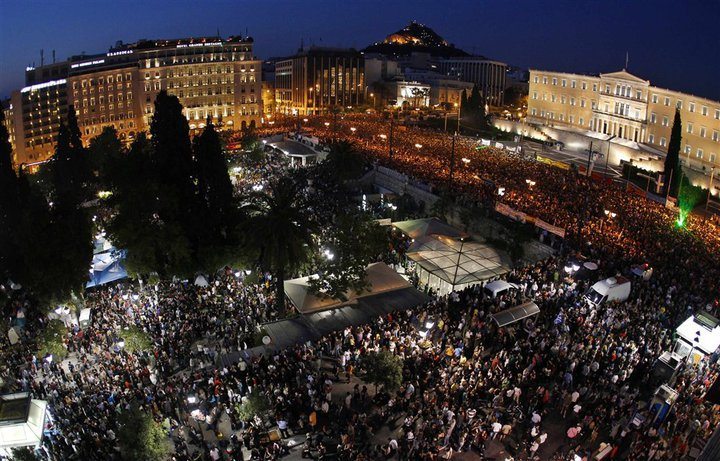
Demonstrators in front of the Greek parliament, 29 May.

29 May was set as a day of peaceful pan-European demonstrations. It was estimated that the demonstration in Athens alone attracted more than 100,000 demonstrators in front of the Greek parliament, while others put the estimates around 80,000. Demonstrations included people of all ages and financial backgrounds. The oldest person at the demonstration was a 102-year-old grandmother looking after her granddaughter, who also spoke at the people's assembly in support of the demonstrations. An estimated 10,000 people gathered in front of the White Tower of Thessaloniki in Greece's second city, and demonstrations were also held in a number of other Greek cities. Some of the most popular slogans that were heard on 29 May were "the worst form of violence is poverty" and "a magical night, like in Argentina, lets see who gets in the helicopter first!", a reference to Argentine President Fernando de la Rúa's resignation and escape from the presidential mansion using a helicopter in 2001. Some of the demands that the Real Democracy Now! movement has formulated during the assemblies at syntagma Square include:

- Adoption of a new constitution, written by the people and not the members of parliament
- Refusal to pay debt which members of the movement consider to be odious
- Cancellation of the memorandum signed between Greece and the International Monetary Fund
- Harder taxation on the rich.

A similar vote was issued by the people's assembly in Thessaloniki.

30 May saw continued demonstrations in Athens and other cities around Greece, although visibly smaller than the demonstrations of 29 May. More than 4,000 people demonstrated in front of the Greek parliament on 30 May, with some sources claiming that over 10,000 people were present. The demonstrators also set up a set of gallows in front of the parliament, demanding that those responsible for the crisis be sent to justice. Over 30 tents were set up in front of the White Tower of Thessaloniki in Greece's second-largest city, where a direct democracy style people's assembly took place every evening.

31 May marked seven days since the start of the protests, and the University of Athens hosted an anti-government protest with the aid of famous Greek composer and anti-dictatorship fighter Mikis Theodorakis, while the dean of the university was also a key speaker at the event. Once the protest at the university was over, the 10,000 protesters joined forces with the demonstrators already in front of the parliament, totalling between 25,000 and 50,000. The demonstrators surrounded the Greek parliament, making it impossible for MPs and workers inside the building to exit. Eight MPs escaped through the adjacent National Gardens. Later, riot police created a passage to enable MPs to exit the parliament, to the loud condemnation of 1,000 protesters gathered at the side entrance.

==== June ====
Demonstrations continued on 1 June. At Corfu, protesters surrounded a restaurant where Greek and foreign members of parliament were having a dinner, shouting slogans against them while a few were throwing rocks and other objects at the politicians. Finally, the officials were forced to escape by boat, as the restaurant was near the harbour. In Athens, more than 15,000 people gathered in front of the parliament to protest for an eighth day in a row. This time they were also joined by the Society for the Protection of Citizens by the Arbitration of Banks, and also a group of motorcyclists who also showed their support for the protests. Earlier that evening the riot police had closed up the streets leading up to the embassy of Egypt. To avoid being blockaded inside the parliament like on 31 May, the members of parliament left early on 1 June. Among thousands of protesters in Syntagma square, 32 Greek scientists addressed a letter to the members of parliament calling them to announce the whole truth of the situation

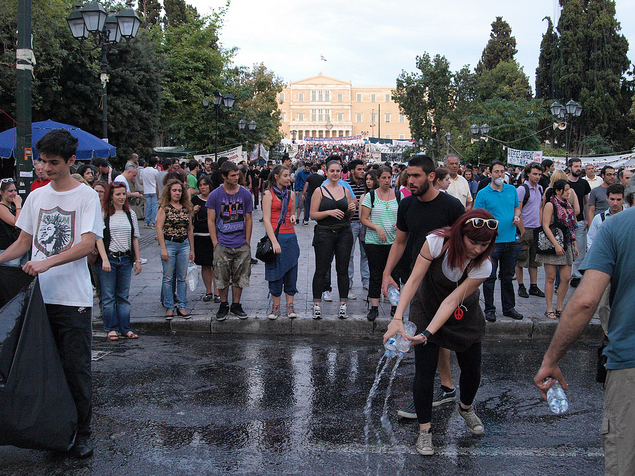
Indignants cleaning the streets around Syntagma Square on their 22nd day of protest on 15 June.

5 June was set as a second day of pan-European demonstrations and marked the 12th continuous day of demonstrations. It is estimated that well over 200,000 gathered at Athens' Syntagma Square that evening to protest against the government. Some sources put the number of people in front of the parliament to over 300,000 while the organizers claim that over 500,000 people took part in the demonstration, making it the largest demonstration in Athens since the 1980s. At the people's assembly a direct connection with Madrid's Puerta del Sol was made via Skype. Some tension occurred on 5 June, as protesters were prevented from heading towards Syntagma Square by riot police, which had put together large metallic barriers to close off streets. Police also brought a water cannon to the protests. Demonstrations also took place in Thessaloniki, Patras and Heraklion, as well as a number of other Greek cities.Some of the most popular slogans of that day included:

- Bread-Education-Freedom – the dictatorship didn't fall in '73!
- We do not owe, we will not sell away, we will not pay.
- Minister of culture, minister of censorship

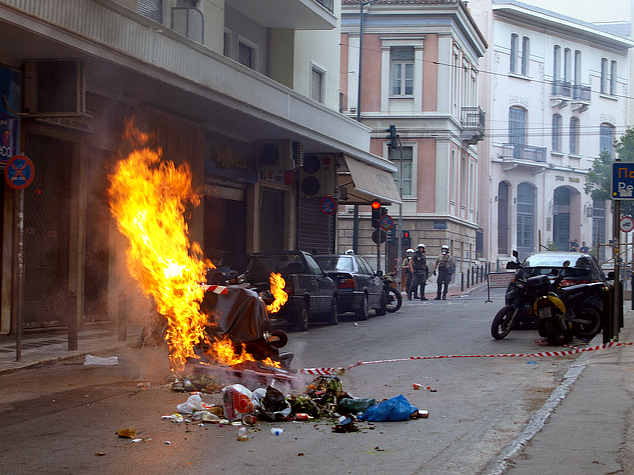
A bin on fire during riots of 29 June in a street near parliament.

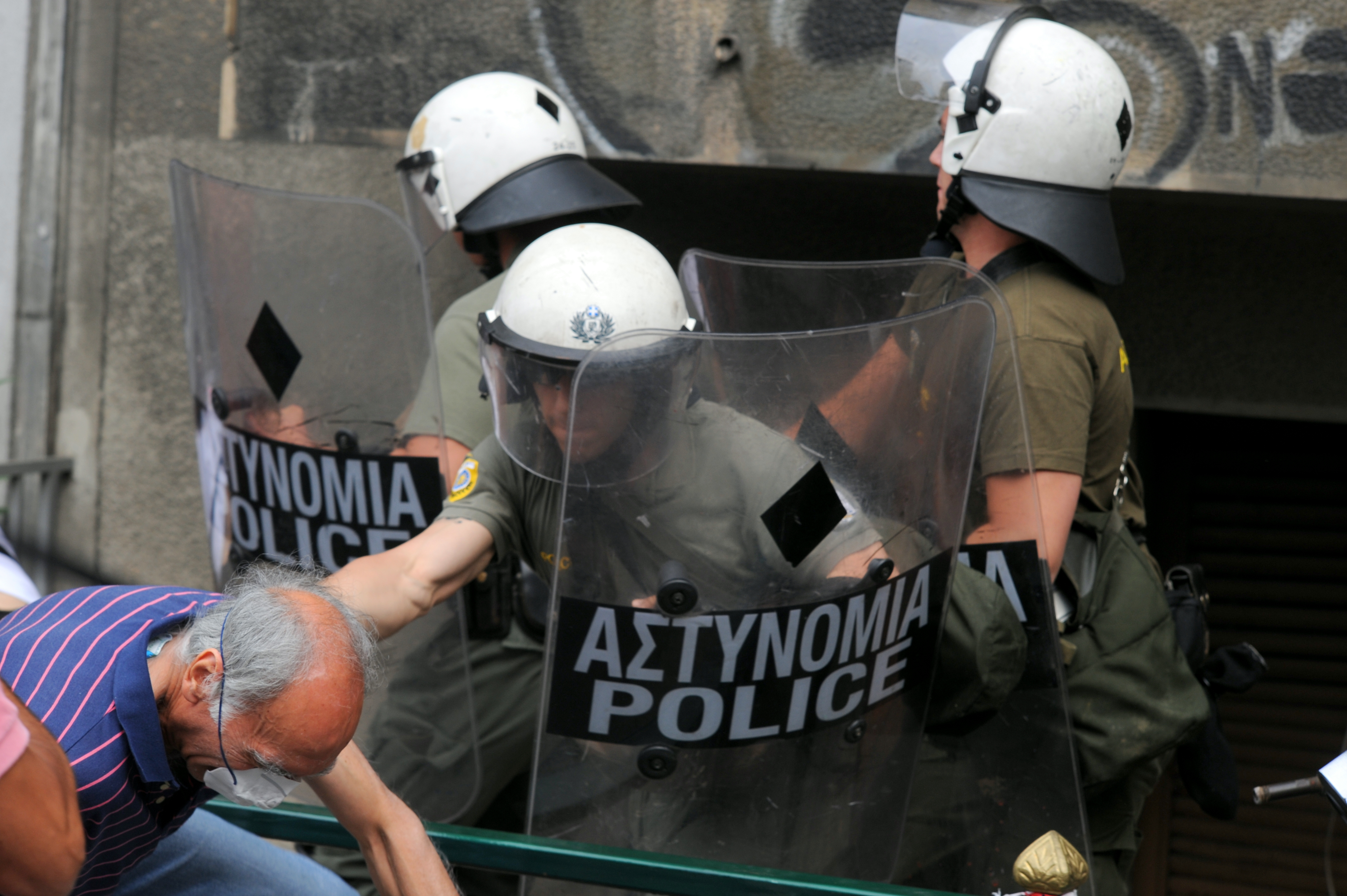
Clash between riot police and a citizen – 29 June 2011.

Demonstrations continued throughout June, both at Syntagma Square and other squares in cities across the country. On 28 June 2011, Greek unions, including those whose members dominate the country's health, transportation, education, and government jobs began a 48-hour strike, in protest of the deteriorating economic situation and suggestions on the part of the government of new austerity measures. The walkout led to the freezing of a number of public services. Journalists and a number of artists also stopped working in solidarity with the protest. That day demonstrations turned violent as protesters clashed with police in front of the Greek parliament and other areas of central Athens. Violence continued during the night and on 29 June, the day when a new package of deeply unpopular austerity measures was passed. The police attempted to evacuate Syntagma Square of protesters, as well as other key protest points in Athens, by driving through the crowds on motorbikes and throwing stun grenades while making extensive use of tear gas. Media mentioned that the police used unnecessary violence against protesters. Officials from the Athens Metro also said that the police had fired tear gas inside the Syntagma Square metro station. Police also stormed Monastiraki, as well as the streets around the Acropolis, randomly hitting people eating at taverns and making extensive use of chemicals and stun grenades. Doctors at the infirmary set up at Othonos Square said the police had attacked them using stones and pieces of marble. Earlier, two members of the Teacher's Association were attacked by police and were injured, one of them on the head. Police also tried to deny access to the square to an ambulance attempting to transport heavily injured civilians to a hospital. A total of about 270 people were injured on 28 June alone, and over 500 visited the Syntagma Square metro station infirmary on 29 June. The Ministry of Health reported that 99 people were sent to hospitals on 29 June. Following almost two days of violence in the streets in front of the Greek parliament, the Greek TV channel Alter aired a video with claiming that it was showing members of the riot police co-operating with extreme Right syndicalists. The Minister for Citizen Protection, Christos Papoutsis, ordered an immediate investigation in the claims according to which the police collaborated with hooded neo-Nazis . The damage caused to Athens' historic city center is estimated to be over 500,000 euro, as shop fronts were vandalised by hooded youth. Finally, it had been proved that there was no cooperation between Greek police and the extreme Right syndicalists, but in fact, it was a group of anarchists that had attacked the Right syndicalists and the police had to intervene to end the clashes. Three of Greece's most famous hotels located on Syntagma Square were forced to evacuate their guests and personnel in view of the uncontrollable situation, something that the media say has not happened since the events of December 1944, which started the Greek Civil War.

Meanwhile, in Thessaloniki, a crowd of people had blocked a number of important political and religious figures from exiting the grounds of the Papafeio Orphanage, including Minister of Health Andreas Loverdos and the metropolitan bishop of Thessaloniki, Anthimus. The crowds demanded that the Greek Orthodox Church help Greece in this time of crisis and accused the clergy of receiving oversized salaries. When protesters asked the metropolitan bishop how much his religious attire costs, he replied "not much, it's fake". They were forced to exit the grounds through the back door with the aid of the police, using police cars and taxis, while Anthimus left on foot.

Despite the violent protests and use of tear gas by police to evacuate Syntagma Square the previous evening, peaceful protests continued on 30 June with thousands of people gathered in front of the Greek parliament. Demonstrations also took place in Greece's second city, Thessaloniki.

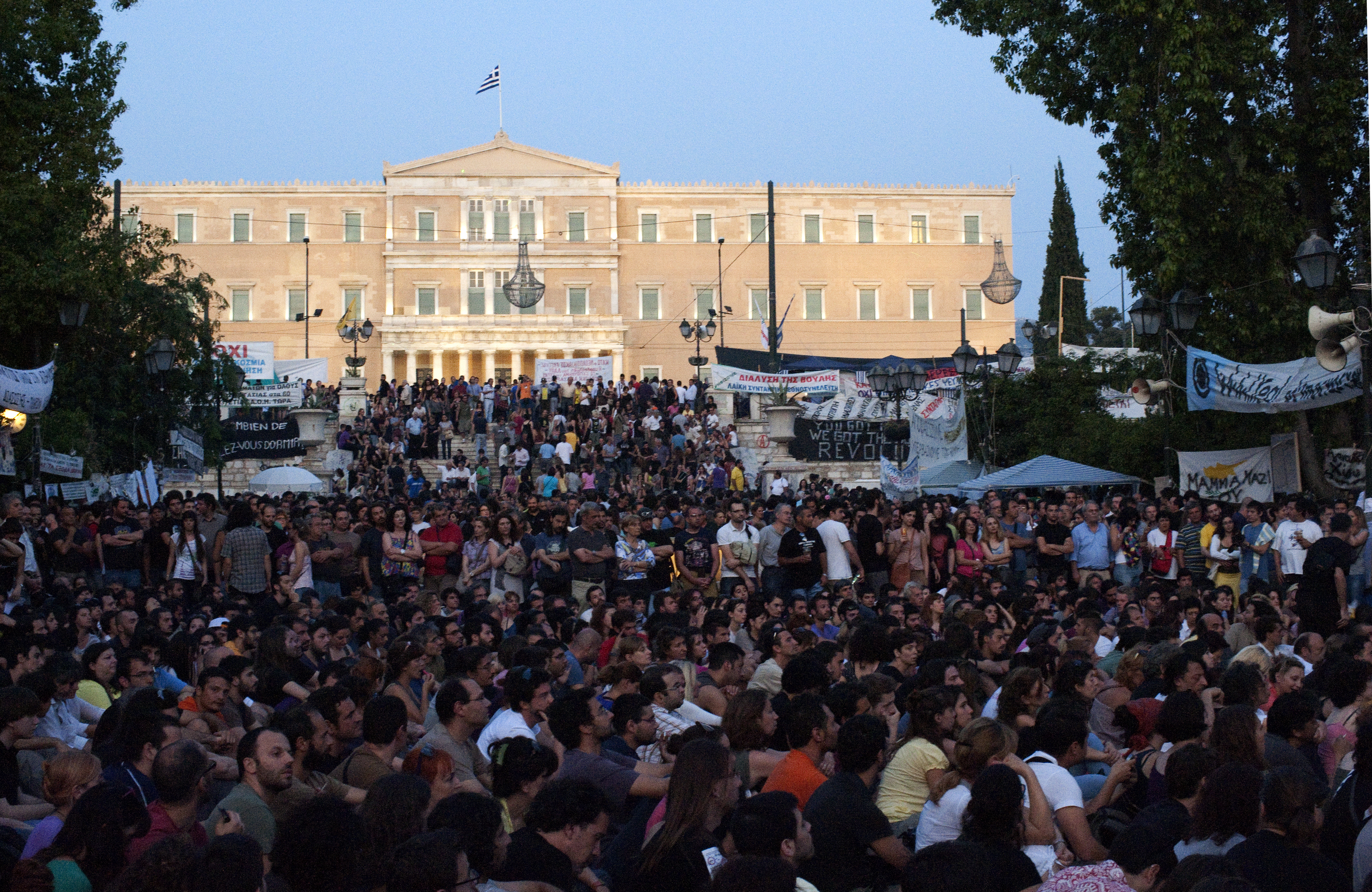
The People's Assembly in front of the parliament on 30 June.

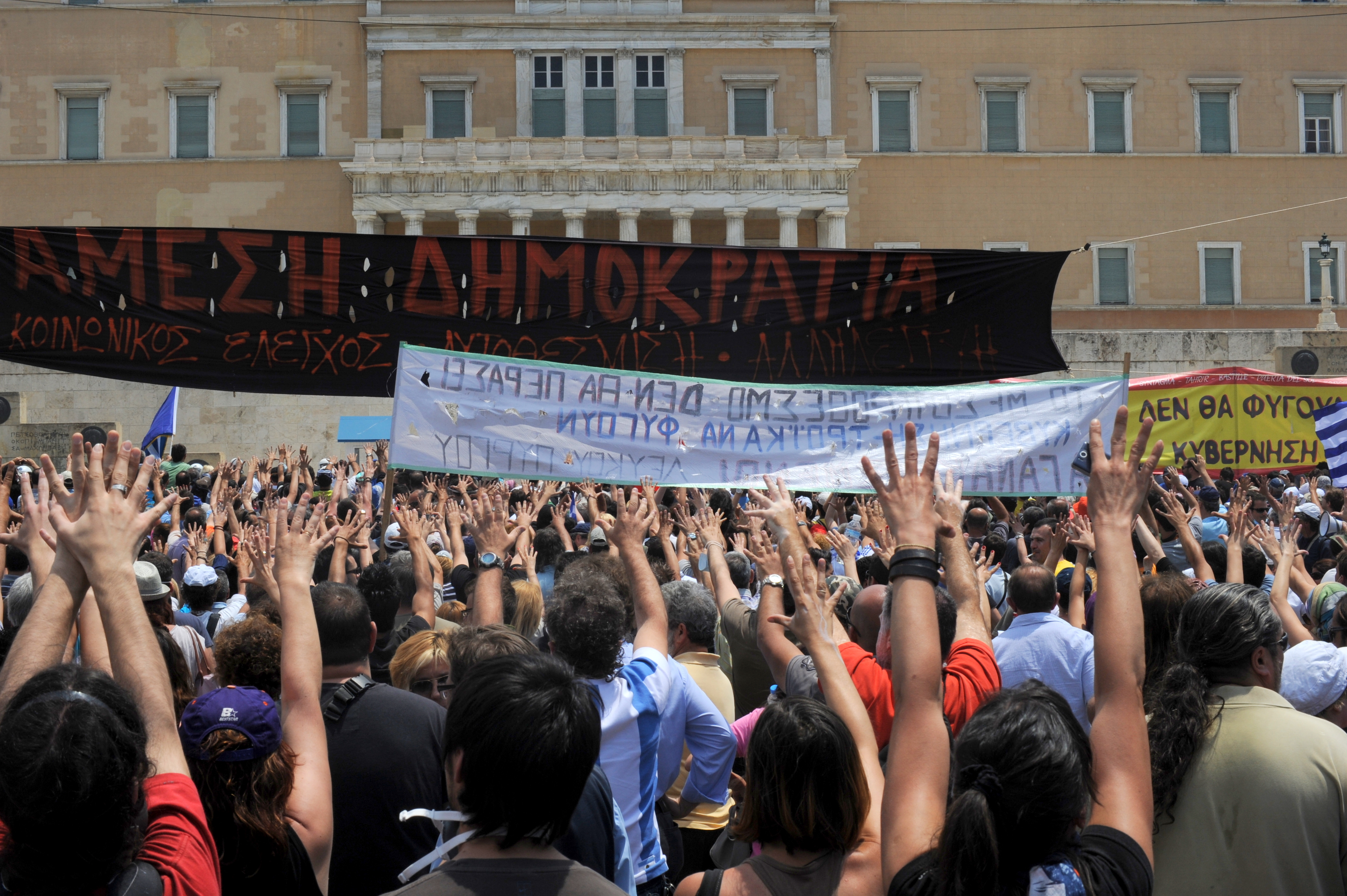
The moutza, an insulting gesture in Greek culture, is extensively used in the protests.

A police officer appears to pick an object off the ground and throws it, as a protester using a camera calls to him to put it down because he is being filmed. Others in the background chant for the police to leave the square.

==== July ====
Protests across the country continued in July, marking 5 weeks and 2 days of protest on 1 July. Despite the fact that the austerity measures had been passed, a large crowd, but smaller than on previous days, gathered in front of the Greek parliament to protest peacefully on 2 July.

==== August ====
The sit-in at Thessaloniki's White Tower Square held throughout July and early August, until the municipal police evacuated the square of all protesters that had camped inside on 7 August 2011. The police said that the protesters were in violation of various archaeological and environmental provisions, while also making seven arrests.

On 14 August 2011, the indignant protesters at Heraklion's Eleftherias Square agreed to leave the square peacefully, following the intervention of a local prosecutor; the prosecutor had warned that unless the demonstrators evacuate the square, force would be used, like in Athens. Following the evacuation of the square by the protesters, police cleared the square of the kiosk that the demonstrators had set up.

==== Political reactions ====
In an interview for the Greek newspaper Ethnos on 29 May 2011, the vice-president of the Greek government, Theodoros Pangalos, against whom various slogans had been shouted during the demonstrations, adopted a sarcastic stance towards the movement. He said that "the formation of a political movement, however much the people who follow the technological trends don't want to hear this, does not depend on how many 'likes' or 'dislikes' it gets on Facebook". He added "movements without ideology and organization, that is to say movements based on anger, can only lead to either an ineffective release [of tension], which at the end of the day is of no interest to the political world, or pave the way for an undemocratic change of regime by organized minorities". In response, the demonstrations addressed multiple chants to the vice-president, like "the country is sinking, Theodore, lose some weight!" and other more vulgar ones.

On 29 May, the spokesman of the Greek government, George Petalotis, spoke out against Pangalos, saying that Pangalos should remember that when he took part in demonstrations against the dictatorship as a member of the Communist Party in 1973, "some people considered these demonstrations provocative". He further added that not only does the Indignant Citizens Movement have a clear ideology (even if it is a "technology trend" as Pangalos described it), but that it also "reflects the real needs of the Greek society". He pointed out that "denial [of the system] and no proposals lead nowhere".

On 1 June, the Prime Minister of Greece, George Papandreou, commented in regards to the Indignant Citizens Movement saying that "today protesters in Greece and the world are demonstrating against matters of national governance which are more weak than they used to be and, despite their inner weaknesses, are trapped by the global powers and the changes of a global system".

Following the blockade of the parliament by angry citizens on 31 May, which prevented the MPs inside from exiting the building, and also after the angry reactions against the MPs when they were allowed to exit (such as the throwing of empty water bottles, fruit and other objects), the deputy Minister of Education said "I understand that the Indignant Citizens Movement is not a threat to democracy, but violence is, and I condemn it". She added that "in a democracy, violence should be prevented and not tolerated" and that "the majority of the MPs in parliament are young; they should receive the same treatment as old MPs". The deputy Minister of Foreign Affairs commented that "I can accept tougher questioning and criticism, but not the leveling of our political system. Democracy can give [a] solution. The flattening of our democracy can only lead to a slippery road. The majority of the Greek people can be angry, but not under these circumstances".

External videos
- Video of the Athens protests on 25 May on YouTube
- The protests of Thessaloniki on 25 May on YouTube
- The protests of Athens on 29 May on YouTube
- Video of police brutality on 29 June, destroying tents and hitting civilians on YouTube
- Video of police hitting and gassing people in a grocery store near Syntagma on 29 June on YouTube
- Video of police throwing tear gas inside a Metro station packed with people on YouTube

European Parliament MP Theodoros Skylakakis, who is aligned with the newly founded Democratic Alliance party, said that "these people need to get a sense of political ideology and move to a deeper revelation: from what they don't like, to what they like", implying that a non-political movement will be ineffective and without results. Alexis Tsipras, leader of the Synaspismos radical left party and the first party leader to comment on the demonstrations, said that "no one has the right to make the people [silent], or tell them that they have no say in their country's future by means of a referendum". He added that the Left should be supportive of the demonstrations and that "things are turning at a fast pace, and the people are waking up".

The Mayor of Athens said on 30 May that the protest was a "healthy and sound demonstration", but when a motion was put forth at the municipal council to declare the municipality's support for the demonstrations, the mayor said that he felt "it is not appropriate to express our sympathy".

In an interview with a Greek newspaper on 1 June 2011, the Spanish Democracia real Ya! movement, which organised the 2011 Spanish Protests and sparked the Greek protests, said that its members support the Greek demonstrations and that "this is only the beginning".

On 2 June 2011, 16 parliament members of PASOK publicly demanded of George Papandreou that the parliament make a full report of country's current financial situation. This was caused by the forthcoming second memorandum voting, which George Papandreou characterised as "urgent".

In the early hours of 22 June 2011, George Papandreou and his government narrowly survived a vote of confidence in the Greek parliament, with 155 of the 300 seats voting in favour.

On 28 June 2011, amid violent protests in the square outside parliament, the Hellenic Parliament voted in favour of passing a new set of austerity measures with a marginal majority of 155 seats in the 300-seat parliament. The measures themselves had attracted much criticism both from the Greek public and within the country's political scene. Between June and July 2011, Panhellenic Socialist Movement (PASOK) went from a 156-seat majority to a 154-seat one, while New Democracy also lost one seat.

The allegations of police brutality by Greek and foreign media as well as Amnesty International sparked heated debate in the Hellenic Parliament, with all parties in the house asking the government for explanations, including MPs of the ruling PASOK party. The leader of the opposition, Antonis Samaras, characterised the situation as almost that of a "parastate", while Georgios Karatzaferis of the Popular Orthodox Rally accused the government of "not being able to control 200 thugs in central Athens". The Coalition of the Radical Left party accused the government of "abolishing the very principles of democracy" and filed a complaint against the government for "cheering while at the same time outside the building tear gas was being overly used". Members of the parliamentary group of PASOK characterised the actions of the police as "barbaric" Christos Papoutsis, the Minister for Citizen Protection, denied all accusations claiming that "it's the police that operates, not the government". Regarding the video in which police are allegedly helping hooded youth, he said that the people in the video are not police; the Athens Prosecutor accepted the demands for an investigation into the matter. On the matter of the attack on the Syntagma metro station using tear gas by police, the minister said that "people with health issues were transported to hospitals and the others left inside were wearing gas masks more expensive than the ones used by police". Giannis Ragousis, Minister for Transport, asked for a disciplinary measure to punish those responsible. The European Commission stated that any use of violence is sad and unacceptable.

Additionally, the Greek government has pledged to amend the constitution as a result of the protests. Among the most important aspects of the constitutional reform will be the change of the functions of the Greek political system. The Greek government has said it will open up the discussion on constitutional amendment in September, both to the public and the media. Other media have pointed out that this could not be legal before 2013 because the constitutional amendment of 2008 forbids any other changes to the constitution prior to 2013.

==== Public perception and media coverage ====
In a survey published in June 2011 by Public Issue on behalf of the Greek TV channel Skai, 98% of people asked said they were informed about the protests. Additionally, 95% of people asked said they had positive impressions about the movement. When asked about their overall opinion of the movement, 86% replied either positive (76%) or probably positive (10%) while 6% replied negative, with an additional 2% as probably negative. 35% of the people asked said they had participated in at least one protest. When asked about their opinion in regards to the media coverage of the events, 53% replied negative and 39% positive. 51% thought the demonstrations are a "very important" event, while 34% felt it was "quite important", with 12% replying they viewed it as either not very important or not important at all. When asked if they believe that the protests may have been politically orchestrated by a political power within the country, 80% replied no and 16% yes. Finally, 52% believed that the protests will bring results, while 39% believed they will not.

Demonstrations were scheduled to continue for "as long as it takes". These demonstrations were the largest event to be organised over the internet in Greece. With the exception of Skai TV, Star Channel and Zougla Radio, which provided live coverage of the demonstrations in Athens, media coverage of these events was relatively poor in the first weeks. Major Greek TV channel Mega was forced to temporarily deactivate its Facebook page as thousands of people left negative and derogatory comments on the page because the channel did not cover the events of 29 May. The demonstrations did catch the attention of the International Monetary Fund, and the spokesman of the organisation expressed "understanding" for the demonstrators. Additionally, the demonstrations have also been featured in Euronews, El País, El Economista and CNN. Mikis Theodorakis, prominent Greek songwriter and political activist, especially during the years of the dictatorship (1967–1974), also expressed his support for the movement in an open letter addressed to the demonstrators. Famous Greek singer Giannis Kotsiras also expressed his open support for the initiative. Some members of the Greek clergy have also expressed their open support for the demonstrations, notably bishops Anthimus of Thessaloniki and Ambrosius of Kalavryta.

==== Gallery ====
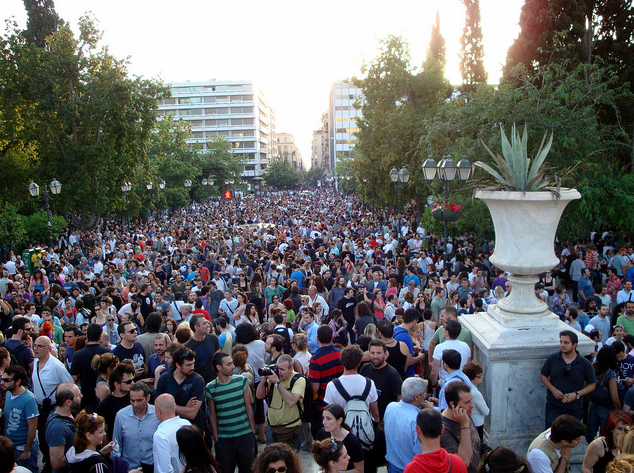
Athens (25 May)

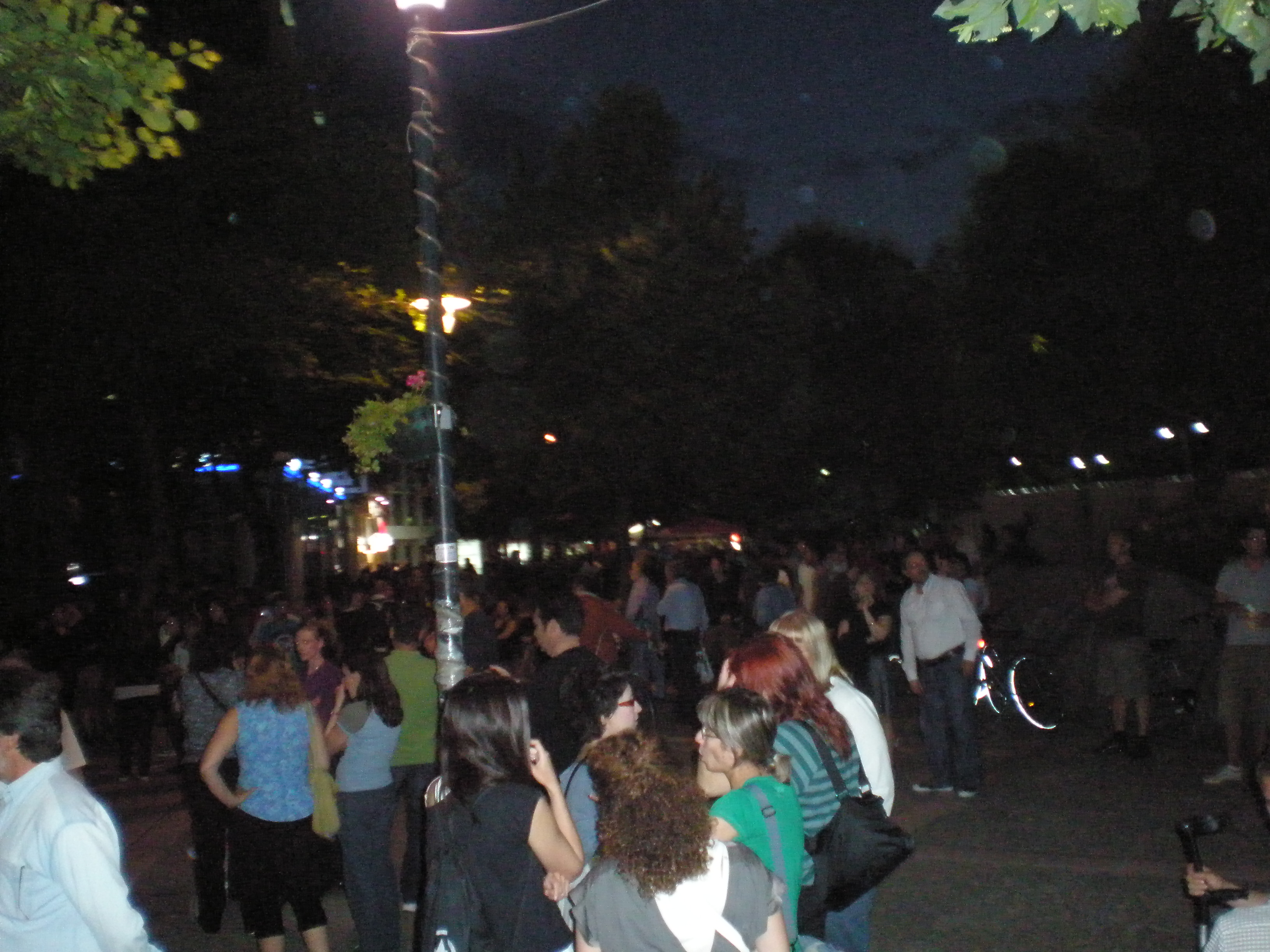
Larissa (30 May)

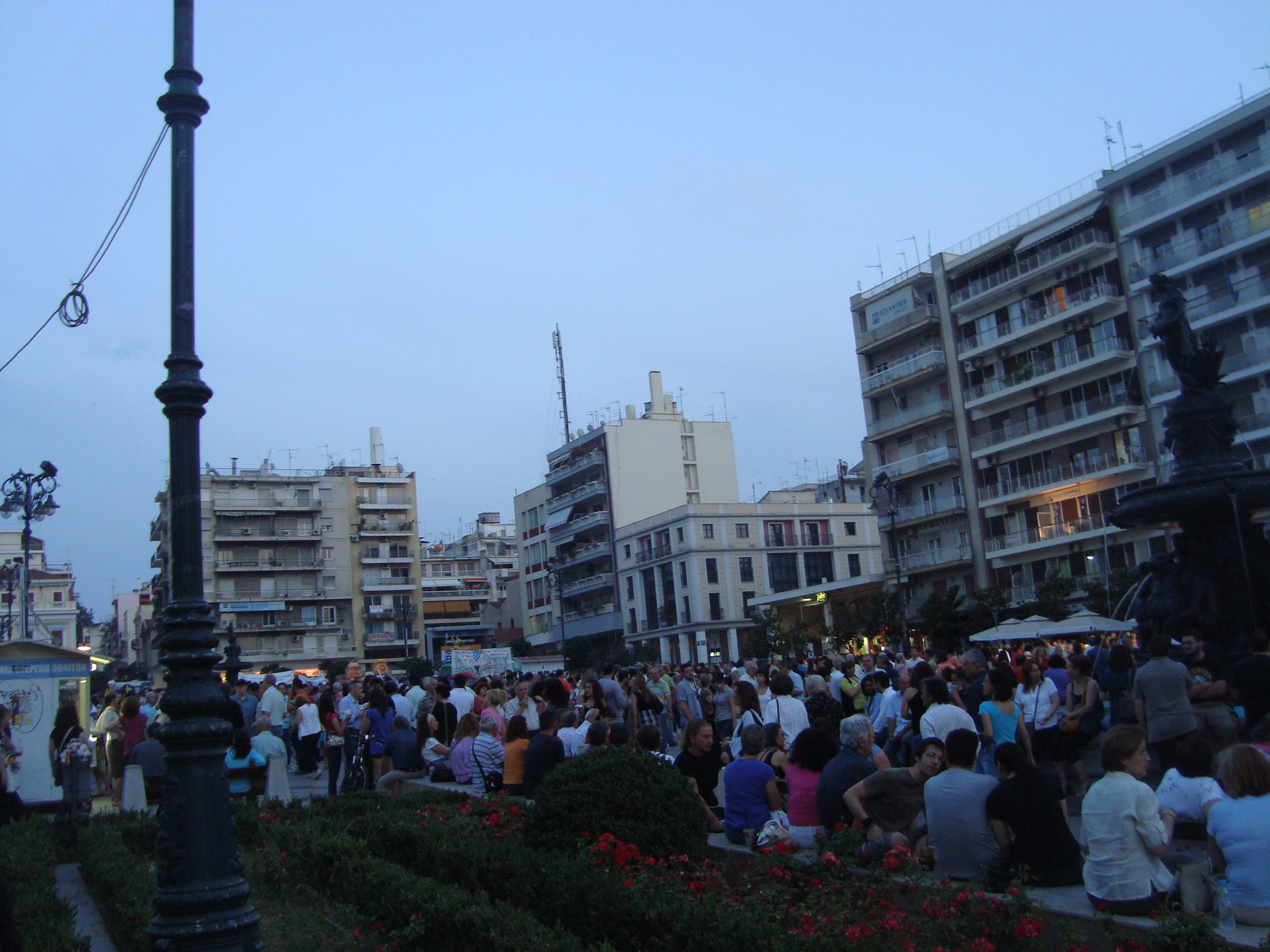
Patras (5 June)

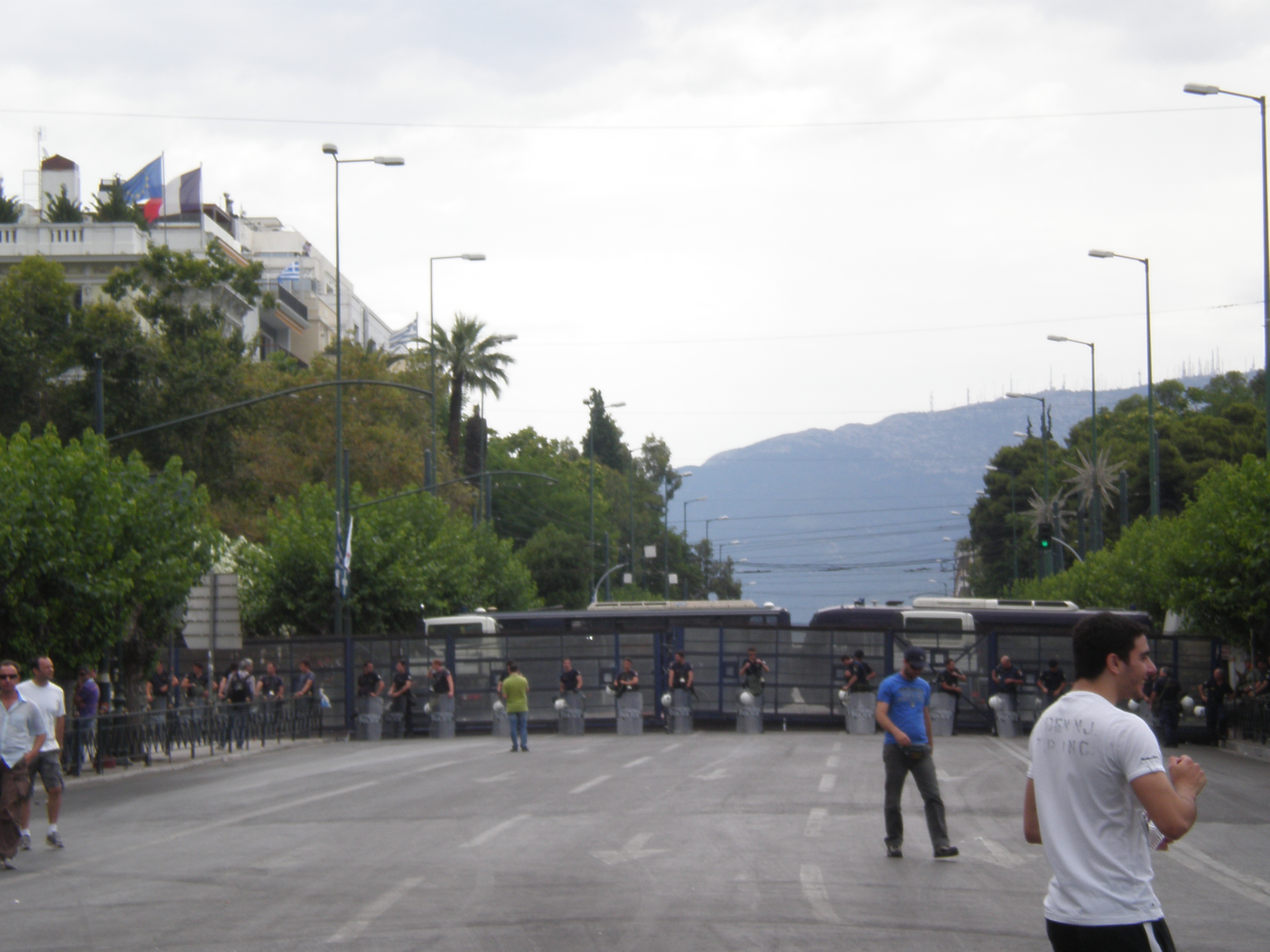
Police barricade

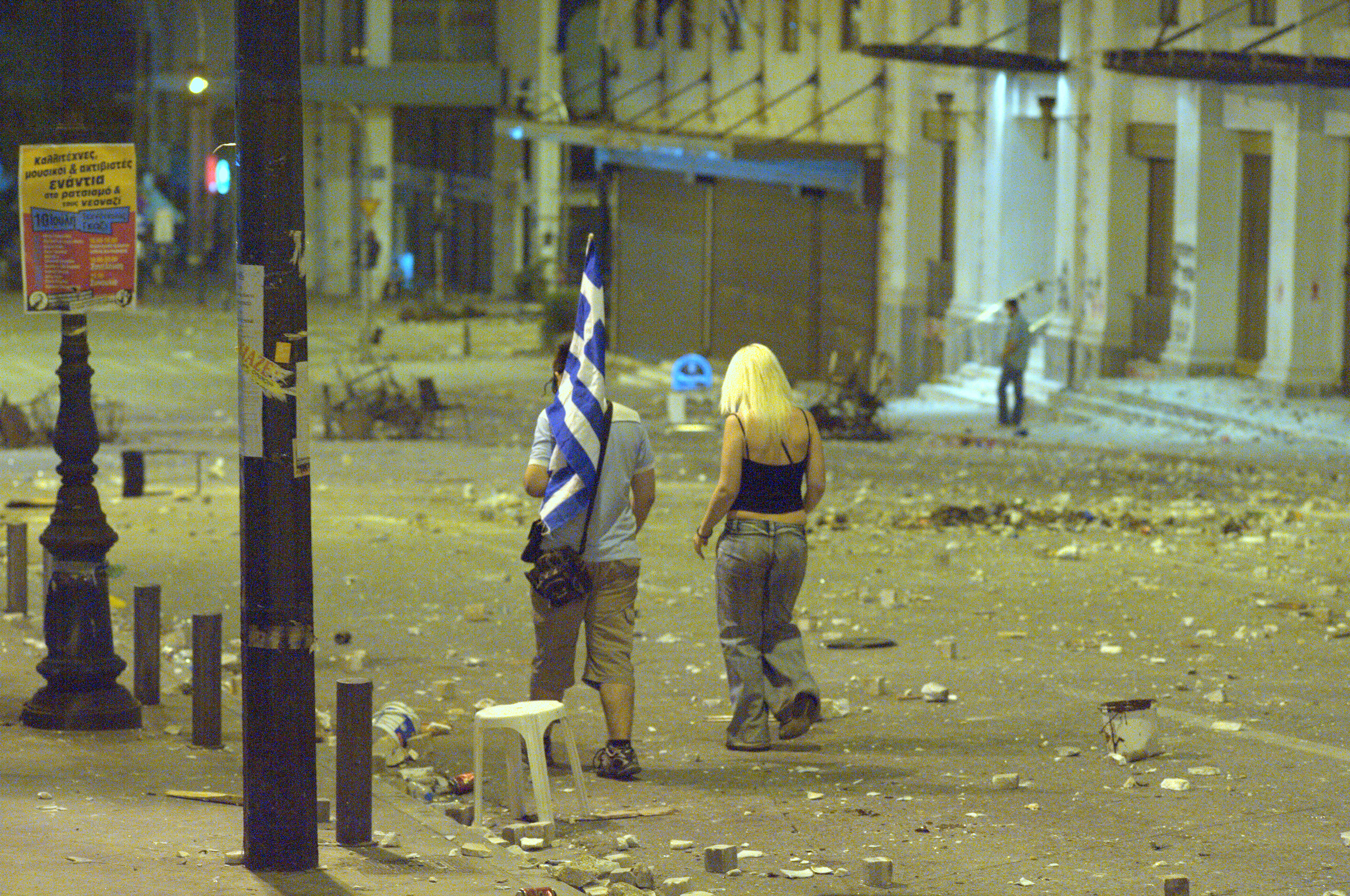
Destruction of 29 June (Athens)

=== Other protests in 2011 ===
==== August ====
On 23 August 2011, there was a demonstration by workers in the tourism sector. The Pan-Worker's Front staged a sit-in at some of Athens' most famous hotels on Syntagma Square, as well as the iconic Electra Palace Hotel in Thessaloniki's Aristotelous Square. Meanwhile, the Federation of Tourism Workers held a 24-hour strike and a demonstration in a central square of Athens. The Federation also said that they would hold another 24-hour strike, but did not define a date for it. The sit-in at various hotels was met with criticism from government officials as well as various labour unions involved in the tourism sector.

==== September ====
In early September 2011, as new measures were announced by the Minister for Finance on 6 September, various unions of the country's public sector announced they would go on strike. These include teachers, doctors, taxi drivers, customs officials and tax collectors, as well as waste collectors working for the municipality of Athens. Additionally, the air traffic controller's union announced that, in the interest of serving the public, air traffic controllers would not go on strike but would refuse to work overtime. Workers at the Swedens Urban Transport Organization (which includes the Athens Metro) are considering going on strike as well.

==== October ====
On 5 October 2011, there was a general strike. During the demonstrations police clashed with youth and made 10 arrests. Police are also investigating claims by journalists that they were assaulted by police officers. The police officer who assaulted the journalist was arrested, but then released on 6 October until conclusive evidence is found.

There were demonstrations in co-ordination with the Occupy Wall Street movement on 15 October. Only 7,000 demonstrators, according to estimates by local media, gathered on Syntagma square in a peaceful demonstration. Further protests and strikes were organised for 19 and 20 October.

The strikes in fact began on 17 October, when the seaman's union walked off the job for 48 hours, shutting down the ferry services between the islands. Customs officials who clear fuel refinery deliveries also held a 24-hour strike that day. The shortage of fuel and goods in the Greek islands due to the strike of ferry and fuel services has already begun to manifest itself.

The second day of the protests was marked by clashes between members of Communist Party (KKE) and hard-line protesters (mainly anarchists) who tried to invade the parliament, resulting in the death of one KKE member.

On 28 October (a national holiday in Greece), protests occurred nationwide. In Thessaloniki, where a national military parade is held annually, protesters prevented the parade from officially taking place (the first time this occurred since the parade was first held in 1941) and shouted slogans against Karolos Papoulias, the President of Greece, who was forced to leave. However, the civilian part of the parade along with the conscriptees marched as planned, acclaimed by the crowd. In Athens, during the annual student parade, several schools turned their heads away from the officials present (which included Anna Diamantopoulou, the Minister of Education), while of the members of the band of the Municipality of Athens attached black ribbons to their instruments, as if in mourning. Additionally, a crowd of people had gathered in front of the historic Hotel Grande Bretagne in central Athens (close to the VIP stand) and shouted slogans against the 2008 financial crisis. In Heraklion protesters threw eggs at the officials, while in Patras protesters occupied the street where the scheduled student parade was to take place and shouted slogans against the officials present (which included the Minister for Defence). Heckling of politicians occurred in multiple other cities across the country, including Trikala, Veria, Corfu, Serres, Veroia, Tripoli and Rhodes.

==== November ====
On 17 November, the annual day of demonstrations to mark the 1973 Polytechnic Uprising against the junta, over 50 thousand people marched in Athens, additionally demanding the resignation of the Papandreau government.

==== December ====
On 6 December, to mark an anniversary of the death of Alexandros Grigoropoulos, thousands of people marched on the Parliament building, throwing Molotov cocktails at the police, who responded with tear gas.

== 2012 protests ==
On 12 February, as many as 500,000 protesters gathered in Athens outside the Parliament House to voice opposition to Lucas Papademos' caretaker cabinet's austerity measures which were being debated in Parliament. The passing of the austerity measures is a precondition for the next €130 billion lending package from the European Commission and the International Monetary Fund to the Greek government, without which the country would face sovereign default by 20 March. Police used large amounts of tear gas and flash grenades, while protesters hurled stones and Molotov cocktails. In total 45 buildings were set ablaze and 25 protesters and 40 officers were injured. The protests had been preceded by a 24-hour nationwide general strike on 7 February, when the two largest labour unions in Greece said the proposed measures would "drive Greek society to despair."

Speaking to members of Parliament, Papademos called for calm and urged members to pass the plan while asserting that violence and vandalism had no place in democracy. He also stated to the lawmakers that if the majority of them chose to vote against the austerity measures there would be several onerous consequences, including that the government would not be able to pay the salaries of its employees. On 13 February, the Greek Parliament subsequently approved this latest round of austerity measures by a vote of 199 to 74. On 20 March, the government finally announced they have defaulted and rejected another package from Brussels Bailout and are starting to reform the system. On 5 April, people once again demonstrated against the government after a pensioner named Dimitris Christoulas committed suicide by shooting himself, refusing to share the fate of those people who have had to search for food in garbage.

On 18 October 2012 another demonstration against austerity measures was held. During the demonstration, clashes broke out and a man died of heart attack outside the parliament.

=== Aftermath of the 2012 protests ===
The anti austerity movement in Greece led to a gradual decline in the popularity of the socialist PASOK party. In 2011, Greece had the highest rate of those at risk of poverty or social exclusion in the Eurozone (31 per cent compared to an average of 24.2 per cent across the EU as a whole). The suicide rate in Greece had increased 26.5 per cent from 377 in 2010 to 477 in 2011. The declining conditions led to the left wing SYRIZA party being swept to power in early 2015 with their anti austerity policies being well received across Greece.

== See also ==
- 2008 Greek riots
- 2010 Greek truck drivers' strike
- Anti-austerity movement in Spain
- Crisis situations and unrest in Europe since 2000
- December 2001 riots in Argentina
- List of protests in the 21st century
