= Aris Portosalte =

Greek journalist

- Άρης Πορτοσάλτε
- Born: 7 September 1963 (age 62); Istanbul, Turkey
- Citizenship: Greek
- Occupation: Journalist
- Years active: 1984–present
- Employer: Skai Group

Aris Portosalte (Greek: Άρης Πορτοσάλτε) is a journalist of the Greek radio station Skai 100.3 and the TV channel Skai TV. Born in Istanbul in 1963, he has been a journalist since 1984. In 1989, he started working as a newspaper reporter. Then he continued as a radio producer for Skai 100.3. Since 1991, he presents news broadcasts on the radio where he has his own radio show. He also writes articles at the newspaper Kathimerini and he participates as a guest commenter at the news of Skai TV. Recently he became famous for his commentary on the Greek government-debt crisis. He was also journalist and coordinator of the famous TV show series of Skai TV 1821; the birth of a nation (2011).

On 17 December 2014, Portosalte started the presentation of the new radio series Knowing our history - The Birth of an archipelago in collaboration with the Natural History Museum of the Lesvos Petrified Forest and the Universities of Aegean, Crete and Thessaloniki.
