= Alafouzos =

Alafouzos (Greek: Αλαφούζος) is a surname. The female form of the surname is Alafouzou. Notable people with the surname include:

- Aristeidis Alafouzos (1924 –2017), Greek businessman Greek and civil engineer
- Giannis Alafouzos (born 1957), Greek businessman, son of above
