= Tasos Telloglou =

Greek investigative journalist

Tasos Telloglou (Greek: Τάσος Τέλλογλου; born 1961) is a Greek investigative journalist. He is one of the presenters of the weekly news program "Special Report" on ANT1. He also writes for the newspaper Kathimerini.

He was born in Ampelokipi, Athens in 1961. He studied Law at the National and Kapodistrian University of Athens. He started his journalistic career in 1986 writing for the newspaper I PROTI until 1989. He has been a Germany correspondent for the daily Greek newspaper Kathimerini from 1990 to 1997 and for the Mega Channel from 1993 to 2000. For two years from 1998, Tasos Telloglou along with the journalists Alexis Papahelas and Pavlos Tsimas, presented the program "Mavro Kouti" ("The Black Box") in Mega Channel. In 2001 he started writing for the newspaper To Vima. In 2001 he worked with Pavlos Tsimas and Yorgos Kouvaras for the news program "Kokkino Pani" ("Red Flag") on ANTENNA TV. From June 2002 to July 2004, he worked for the New Hellenic Television presenting the monthly documentary series "Monitor" and "Striptease". In October 2004, he presented his first report in the program "Oi Fakeloi " ("The Folders") in Mega Channel and was editor in chief until 2007. From October 2007, he co-hosts the newsprogram "Oi Neoi Fakeloi" ("The New Folders "), the continuation of the program "Oi Fakeloi ", along with Alexis Papahelas and Sofia Papaioannou in Skai TV.

During the season 2007–2008 Telloglou was awarded the Best Report of the Year Award of the "Prosopa 2008" television awards for his exposé on the Greek aspect of the Siemens slush funds scandal.

== Controversy ==
On 28 April 2010, a commenter on Telloglou's blog suggested that certain constitutional provisions be either suspended or re-interpreted, as well as that measures be undertaken to expedite court rulings examining the legality of strikes, citing the example of Belgium. The commenter signed the comment with the name Tasos Telloglou, sparking controversy among part of the blogosphere and the press. The comments on the article in question have since disappeared, following a revamping of the hosting site. Telloglou accepted authorship in a subsequent blog post, in which he clarified and partly revised his views. In there, he proposed a number of constitutional amendments, among which that demonstrators be required to apply for permission beforehand to curb the wave of demonstrations (of which there were 11,045 in 6 years in Athens alone).

== Bibliography ==
Tasos Telloglou has written four books:

- "Η γερμανική πολιτική στον γιουγκοσλαβικό χώρο 1991 – 1995" (The German policy in the Yugoslavia 1991 – 1995) (1996).
- "Φάκελος 17 Νοέμβρη" (Folder 17 November) (2002) – Co-authored with Alexis Papahelas, about the Revolutionary Organization 17 November.
- "Η πόλη των Αγώνων" (The City of the Games) (2004), about the preparation period of the Athens Olympic Games in 2004.
- "Το Δίκτυο – Φάκελος Siemens" (The Network – File Siemens) (2009), about the Greek aspect of the Siemens slush funds scandal.
