= Direct Democracy Now! =

Greek grassroots organization

Άμεση Δημοκρατία Τώρα! Direct Democracy Now!
- Formation: May 2011
- Type: Grassroots organization
- Legal status: Active
- Purpose: Establishment of direct democracy
- Location: Greece

Direct Democracy Now! (Greek: Άμεση Δημοκρατία Τώρα! Amesi Dimokratia Tora!), also known as True Democracy Now! (Greek: Πραγματική Δημοκρατία Τώρα! and in Spanish as Democracia Real Ya Grecia) is a Greek grassroots NGO that was actively involved in the 2011 Greek protests. Inspired by the Spanish ¡Democracia Real YA! movement, Direct Democracy Now! co-ordinated demonstrations throughout Greece and published the proceedings of the people's assemblies at the central demonstration at Syntagma Square.

The movement is one of the first major Greek NGOs to be formed by citizens that did not care for any of the traditional political parties of Greece. The NGO functions as a platform for its members, known as the "indignants", where they exchange ideas and express their disapproval with the current particracy.

== See also ==
- 2010-2012 Greek protests
- ¡Democracia Real YA!
