= Nasos Athanasiou =

Greek politician and journalist (1951–2026)

- Νάσος Αθανασίου

Member of the Hellenic Parliament
- In office 6 May 2012 – 22 April 2023
- Constituency: Attica (2012–2019); A' East Attica (2019–2023)

Personal details
- Born: 2 March 1951 Athens, Greece
- Died: 2 June 2026 (aged 75) Athens, Greece
- Party: New Left (2023–2026); SYRIZA (2012–2023)
- Occupation: Journalist, politician

Athanasios "Nasos" Athanasiou (Greek: Αθανάσιος (Νάσος) Αθανασίου; 2 March 1951 – 2 June 2026) was a Greek journalist and politician.

== Life and career ==
Athanasiou was born in Athens on 2 March 1951 and grew up in Aigaleo. A graduate of the Athens Law School, he worked for the newspapers Ethnos, Kathimerini, and Eleftheros Typos, as well as the magazines Ena and Eikones. On 2 February 1976, he began hosting the informative show Kathe Mesimeri ("Every Afternoon") on ERT. On 20 December of the same year, he enlisted in the army, and his position was filled by Michalis Roussos until 14 April 1979, when ERT decided to terminate the program. Athanasiou also worked at the television station ERT1 alongside Giorgos Papadakis and Semina Digeni on the news program Treis ston aera ("Three on the Air"). For many years, he worked at Mega Channel, hosting the program I Ekpompi ("The Show").

He was a long-time member of the Journalists' Union of the Athens Daily Newspapers (ESIEA), on whose board of directors he had been elected and served.

In addition to journalism, he went into politics, serving as a member of parliament for Attica with Syriza from May 2012 to 2019, and for A' East Attica from 2019 to 2023, representing the same party. In late 2023, he departed from SYRIZA-PS and joined the New Left, serving as a founding member and a participant in the party's Transitional National Coordination Committee.

He was married to Evangelia Athanasiou, with whom he had two children.

Following a long illness, he died in Athens of cancer on 2 June 2026, at the age of 75.
