= Sofia Papaioannou =

Greek journalist and television host

Sofia Papaioannou (Greek: Σοφία Παπαϊωάννου; born 1969) is a Greek journalist and television host. Since September 2022, Papaioannou has been a producer and host of ERT 1 and ERTNEWS's 365 Moments, a Greek news magazine that covers an array of topics connected to politics, social issues, international affairs and history. She is currently co-founder and CEO of ISTORIMA, the biggest oral history and story-telling project in Greece designed to benefit unemployed Greek youth.

== Biography ==
Papaiaoannou was born in Athens, Greece, in 1969 and was raised in Palaio Faliro, a coastal suburb of Athens.

Papaioannou holds a BA in History from Deree College, American College of Greece, and a BA in English Literature from the University of Athens. She received a Master's degree in Broadcast Journalism from New York University before returning to Greece to work in both print and broadcast journalism.

Papaioannou has been active and visible in Greek journalism for 25 years. She has worked at four major Greek television stations: Antenna, Mega, Skai, and Alpha, working in a variety of roles and capacities (journalist, editorial director, co-anchor, co-presenter, presenter, and producer), and has covered stories across the world as well as across Greece. Alpha TV host of 365 Degrees investigative news show. She has also hosted a radio show, served as Editorial Director of the Greek edition of the Huffington Post, and served as a print reporter for Greece's largest daily, Kathimerini. She served as head of the Foreign Press Office for the Athens 2004 Bid Committee for the Olympic Games.

=== Published works ===
Papaioannou is the author of the book (in Greek), Hidden in the Aegean: A True Story, published in May 2011 by Patakis Editions.

=== Awards ===
Papaioannou was recipient of the 2017 Association of European Journalists' Award.

In 2005, 2006, and 2007 she was recipient of the Greek TV/Ethnos award for the investigative news show "The Files."

== Personal life ==
Papaioannou is married and has two children, a son and a daughter.
