= Attica (constituency) =

Former electoral district of Greece

- Former Electoral constituency for the Hellenic Parliament
- Attica within Greece
- Regional units: East Attica, West Attica
- Administrative region: Attica
- Electorate: 459,572 (January 2015)

Former Electoral constituency
- Abolished: 2018
- Number of members: 15 Members of Parliament
- Replaced by: East Attica, West Attica

Attica (Greek: εκλογική περιφέρεια Αττικής), formerly Remainder of Attica (Υπόλοιπο Αττικής), was an electoral district in the Attica region represented in the Hellenic Parliament. It consisted of East Attica and West Attica and covered all of Attica except for the urban area of Athens (Greater Athens and Greater Piraeus), which were covered by the constituencies of Athens A, Athens B, Piraeus A and Piraeus B. It elected fifteen Members of Parliament (MPs). It was abolished in December 2018 and replaced by East Attica and West Attica.

== Elections Results ==
=== Legislative election ===
Attica constituency results

Election	1st party	2nd party	3rd party	4th party	5th party	source
1996	PASOK 38.98%	New Democracy 38.13%	DIKKI 5.78%	SYN 5.53%	KKE 5.40%	
2000	New Democracy 42.44%	PASOK 41.67%	KKE 5.30%	DIKKI 4.28%	SYN 3.56%	
2004	New Democracy 44.53%	PASOK 38.98%	KKE 6.29%	SYRIZA 3.45%	LAOS 3.23%	
2007	New Democracy 39.25%	PASOK 36.27%	KKE 9.47%	LAOS 5.82%	SYRIZA 5.80%	
2009	PASOK 43.12%	New Democracy 29.44%	LAOS 8.23%	KKE 8.23%	SYRIZA 4.94%	
May 2012	SYRIZA 19.40%	New Democracy 13.71%	ANEL 13.53%	XA 9.70%	KKE 8.71%	
June 2012	SYRIZA 30.19%	New Democracy 25.90%	XA 9.96%	ANEL 9.50%	PASOK 7.70%	
January 2015	SYRIZA 37.08%	New Democracy 25.90%	XA 8.43%	The River 6.12%	ANEL 5.92%	
September 2015	SYRIZA 36.47%	New Democracy 27.11%	XA 8.68%	KKE 5.16%	The River 4.36%	

== Members of Parliament ==
=== Current members ===
The following fifteen MPs have been elected in the Greek legislative election, September 2015:

Name	Parliamentary Group
Aristidis Baltas	Syriza
Nasos Athanasiou	Syriza
Panagiotis Skouroliakos	Syriza
Giorgos Pantzas	Syriza
Ioannis Dedes	Syriza
Makis Voridis	New Democracy
Georgia Martinou	New Democracy
Georgios Vlachos	New Democracy
Athanasios Bouras	New Democracy
Ilias Kasidiaris	Golden Dawn
Evi Christofilopoulou	Democratic Coalition
Ioannis Gkiokas	KKE
George Mavrotas	The River
Konstantinos Katsikis	Independent Greeks
Dimitrios Kavadellas	Enosi Kentroon

=== Members (January 2015 – August 2015) ===
In the Greek legislative election, January 2015, the following fifteen MPs had been elected:

- Nasos Athanasiou (Syriza)
- Ioannis Dedes (Syriza)
- Alexios Mitropoulos (Syriza)
- Giorgos Pantzas (Syriza)
- Panagiotis Skouroliakos (Syriza)
- Eleni Sotiriou (Syriza)
- Athanasios Bouras (New Democracy)
- Georgia Martinou (New Democracy)
- Georgios Vlachos (New Democracy)
- Makis Voridis (New Democracy)
- Ilias Kasidiaris (Golden Dawn)
- George Mavrotas (The River)
- Ioannis Gkiokas (KKE)
- Pavlos Chaikalis (Independent Greeks)
- Evi Christofilopoulou (PASOK)
