= Giannis Alafouzos =

Greek businessman (born 1957)

- Born: 2 July 1957 (age 68); Santorini, Greece
- Occupation: Businessman
- Title: Owner of Ermis Maritime Holdings Ltd; Chairman of Skai Group; Publisher of Kathimerini; Owner of Sortivo International Ltd; Owner of Panathinaikos
- Father: Aristeidis Alafouzos

Giannis Alafouzos (Greek: Γιάννης Αλαφούζος, born 2 July 1957) is a Greek businessman, shipowner, owner and president of Panathinaikos and a member of the Alafouzos family from Santorini.

== Early life ==
Giannis Alafouzos was born in 1957 and is the son of businessman, shipowner and newspaper publisher Aristeidis Alafouzos. He graduated from the University of Oxford with a degree in economics and history. During his student years, he was an athlete who mainly competed in the 100m sprint. He is a sailor with significant international distinctions. He is married and has three children.

== Shipping ==
In the early 1980s, after completing his postgraduate studies, Giannis Alafouzos followed in the steps of his father's career in shipping and worked towards the expansion of his family's shipping company, Glafki (Hellas) Maritime Company. He served as managing director of Kyklades Maritime Corporation, a company operating a modern tanker fleet, and also founded the shipping company Ermis Maritime Corporation. Today he continues his successful career in maritime business. Presently, Kyklades Maritime Corporation is expanding its fleet with two new buildings currently under construction in Japan.

== Media ==
Giannis Alafouzos is the president and managing director of SKAI media group. In 1989, he bought the radio news station SKAI 100.3 and then founded the TV station of the same name. Today, the media group includes the TV station SKAI, 5 radio stations, SKAI 100.3, BWINSPORT FM 94.6, Pepper 96.6, Menta 88 and Happy 104 and various new portals such as skaikairos.gr and sport-fm.gr. He is also the publisher of the daily morning newspaper, Kathimerini.

== Philanthropy ==
Giannis Alafouzos supports many environmental programs and philanthropic activities, organizing and promoting these through the SKAI media outlets and his non-profit organization Oloi Mazi Boroume (English translation: Together We Can). Under his management, Skai Group and Skai Perivallon (English translation: Skai Environment) have organized many actions to clean territories in Greece and recycling. SKAI, along with Kathimerini and WWF Hellas established the "Parnitha Observatory", an action to inform people about the restoration of the burned areas. Since the beginning of 2010, Oloi Mazi Boroume has acted as an ongoing social campaign focused on raising public awareness and organizing events to support several causes and groups (organizing concerts to raise funds for the poor, collecting clothes, food and medicine, setting up soup kitchens around Greece and other similar activities). Oloi Mazi Boroume, as in almost all of his nationwide philanthropic operations, works in close collaboration with the Greek Orthodox Church, aiming to help victims of the Greek financial crisis.

Giannis Alafouzos is among the business leaders who signed the initiative of the Prince of Wales known as Bali Communiqué calling for a comprehensive legally binding United Nations framework to tackle climate change.

== Panathinaikos ==
In May 2012, Giannis Alafouzos, together with players and fans of the football team Panathinaikos, founded the association Panathinaikos Alliance 2012 which took a majority stake in the football club. In September 2012, he was elected president of Panathinaikos F.C. by the members of the Alliance in order to advance the reorganization and consolidation of the association. In 2017, he retired as the chairman of Panathinaikos; but, in 2022, he was elected again as president of Panathinaikos. During his chairmanship, Panathinaikos won the Greek Cup three times (2013–14, 2021–22, 2023–24) and he was honored by the president of the veteran soccer players, Vasilis Konstantinou, for his contribution to Panathinaikos.

== Controversy and conflicts ==
On 10 August 2016, the Greek Prosecutor for Financial Crimes, Panagiotis Athanasiou, ordered the freezing of Alafouzos' property and bank accounts, after an investigation by the Greek Center for the Audit of High-Income Taxpayers (KEFOMEP) concluded that certain amounts were not reflected in his tax returns. Eventually, Alafouzos proceeded to pay the amount due, certified by KEFOMEP, and his property was released. Alafouzos stated that he welcomed the audit and that he would assist in the process with any available information.

In 2016, SKAI TV journalist Kyriakos Thomaidis and Giannis Alafouzos, being the managing director of SKAI, were sued for violating the Privacy Act regarding the 2015 Greek football scandal but were cleared of all charges. Giannis Alafouzos has come up against much opposition in his efforts to reveal corruption in Greek football.
