= Leslie Finer =

British journalist and author

- Born: Leslie Finer; 10 December 1922
- Died: 10 March 2010 (aged 87)
- Occupations: Journalist, author

Leslie Finer (10 December 1922 – 10 March 2010) was a British journalist and author who worked for the BBC, the Financial Times, The Observer, the New Statesman, other British news organisations, Kathimerini and the Canadian Broadcasting Corporation. He covered news in Cyprus and Greece between 1954 and 1968. He was described by Kathimerini as one of the most respected and reliable reporters of that era. Finer was considered an expert on Greek affairs.

== Life and career ==
Finer was born in London's East End. He was the son of Charles and Rachel (Ray) Topper Finer. His father's family were refugees of the antisemitic pogroms in Poland. His elder brother Morris was a high court judge. Finer studied at the London School of Economics and graduated during World War II with a degree in history. During the war he worked for the Ministry of War Transport. He also worked as private secretary to Philip Noel-Baker.

He covered events in Cyprus during the final years of British rule and then reported the news from Athens during the years when the United States exercised major influence on Greek political affairs. He also covered the early stages of junta rule in Greece up to the time at which he was expelled from Greece by the junta.

=== Reporting from Athens during the junta ===
His reports during the coup in Athens caused such alarm to the junta that the colonels bought all the copies of the newspapers which carried his articles and also placed an army officer at the radio station where he created his Greek-language broadcasts. He also helped Helen Vlachos escape from Greece after she was placed under house arrest by the junta. When Vlachos arrived in London, Finer helped her settle using his political contacts in Britain.

His dispatches to the BBC circumvented the regime's attempts at heavy censorship of the news. BBC foreign service broadcasts were popular in Greece throughout the dictatorship years. In 1968 he was declared persona non grata by the junta, and after a final meeting with Stylianos Pattakos, the junta's number-two-man, during which Pattakos gave him a stern rebuke, Finer was deported from Greece for "having the courage to report on what he saw and thought".

The Spectator reported in 1968 that the junta was very annoyed with Finer's three daily broadcasts to the BBC, which caused "tidal ebb and flows of customers" in Athenian cafés. The Spectator also commented that Greece was "stiflingly blanketed by censorship" at the time. His deportation caused an international uproar and subsequently became the subject of a discussion in the British House of Commons.

=== Investigation and analysis of the junta ===
His investigative journalism uncovered a plot which implicated the junta of the colonels and its strongman Georgios Papadopoulos in a campaign in 1968 designed to assist Italian right-wing parties in staging a coup d'état in Italy. He also investigated the role of the colonels in Cyprus and their involvement in undermining Archbishop Makarios. He assisted Georgios Grivas with writing his memoirs.

Finer had once mentioned that the greatest propaganda achievement of the junta was to persuade people that Greek democracy was "sick" before the coup and needed the intervention of the junta before it could improve. In 1975, Finer also reported on the Greek Junta Trials for New Society and wrote: "The trial of 20 ringleaders of the 1967 coup is a test of democratic justice. Among its other functions, this is a mode of exorcism and education."

He also compared the fate of Papadopoulos to that of Adolf Hitler, but stated that: "there is this difference: instead of being dead in his bunker, the "arch villain" George Papadopoulos is alive and reasonably well; so are his chief fellow-conspirators..."

He also wrote for Helen Vlachos's journal Hellenic Review and for the Index on Censorship publications analysing and working against the junta. He gave lectures related to Greek matters for the Canadian Institute of International Affairs and at the University of Bergen in Norway.

== Impact ==
Christopher Hitchens commented on Finer's 1972 article in the New Statesman under the title The Colonels' Bid For Cyprus, saying that: "...[it] still lives in my mind as one of the most Cassandra-like essays ever published." Hitchens explained that Finer had predicted, as early as 1972, the events which led to the ousting of Makarios and the subsequent invasion of the island by Turkey in 1974.

The same article has been called "prophetic" in a report by the Judiciary Committees of both the US House of Representatives. and Senate.

== Publications ==
Leslie Finer is the author of Passport to Greece, illustrated by Spyros Vassiliou.

Leslie Finer translated a number of works.

== Personal life ==
Finer married the famous Greek actress Elsa Vergi in 1954 but they later divorced due to their separation imposed by the junta through his expulsion from Athens and the subsequent refusal of the regime to allow Verghi to visit her husband in London. They had first met in London when he interviewed her for the Evening Standard's column Londoner's Diary.

His second wife was Jean Rubin, who later was diagnosed with Alzheimer's disease. In 1991 he married Jacqueline Sunderland, who also helped him take care of his previous wife, Jean.

== Death ==
Finer was a philhellene who always wanted to be close to events associated with Greece and even managed to find employment as the newsletter editor at the Greek Embassy in Washington, where he worked for over thirty years. He died of cancer at his home in Lewes, Delaware on 10 March 2010.
