= Alexis Papahelas =

Greek investigative journalist

Alexis Papahelas

Alexis Papahelas or Papachelas (Greek: Αλέξης Παπαχελάς; born March 1961), is a Greek investigative journalist and the current Executive Editor of Kathimerini newspaper. He is the creator and principal presenter of the weekly prime time news program called "Oi Neoi Fakeloi" ("The New Files ") on Skai TV, which is a continuation of his show in Mega Channel called "Oi Fakeloi " ("The Files"). “The New Files”, which premiered in the 2010 - 2011 season, was an award-winning current affairs documentary series on domestic and international news which as of the season 2009–2010 season integrated a series of studio interviews. In January 2016 he created and is the principal presenter of the current affairs program "Istories" (Stories) on Skai TV, together with Pavlos Tsimas, Sia Kossioni, and Tasos Telloglou. Papahelas is also a political and diplomatic commentator for the SKAI Evening News, a columnist and the author of three books.

== Biography ==
Papahelas was born in Athens in March 1961 the son of Aristomenis and Aikaterini Papahelas. The family's origins lie in Messinia, southern Peloponnese and in Istanbul. Papahelas grew up in the Athens district Plateia Victorias. He attended Athens College and then went to the United States for tertiary studies. He majored in economics and history at Bard College and later received a Master's in Journalism and International Relations from Columbia University.

Papahelas started his journalistic career in 1983, as the New York City correspondent for the daily Greek newspaper I Avgi, then for Kathimerini, the BBC Greek service and Mega Channel. He returned to Greece in 1998 and wrote for the newspaper To Vima as well as co-hosting, with Pavlos Tsimas and Tasos Telloglou, the news program "Mavro Kouti " ("The Black Box") on Mega Channel for two years. In 2000, he launched the current affairs program "Oi Fakeloi " ("The Files") on Mega Channel which continued for seven years. He was also director of the news desk at Mega as well as the channel's political commentator.

In September 2006, Papahelas began writing for Kathimerini and in April 2007 became the newspaper's editor in chief. In October 2007, Papahelas began the news program "Oi Neoi Fakeloi" ("The New Folders") on Skai TV with Tasos Telloglou and Sofia Papaioannou.

Papahelas has interviewed several important political figures in Greece along with various international figures, among them the military commander of the Zapatista movement, Subcomandante Marcos, in his jungle headquarters in Mexico, Yasser Arafat in his headquarters in Ramallah, former UN Secretary General Kofi Atta Annan, Microsoft Chairman Bill Gates, US Presidents Bill Clinton and George W. Bush, and financier George Soros.

Papahelas is the creator of a pioneering series of history documentaries, including one on the 1922 destruction of Smyrna with rare interviews and footage, the 1967-74 dictatorship in Greece, the 1974 Turkish invasion of Cyprus, the issue of Missing Cypriots. He has interviewed many prominent Greeks such as the politician Leonidas Kyrkos and former king Constantine.

In his first book, entitled “The rape of Greek democracy,” Papahelas documented evidence of the relation between the CIA and the Greek colonels’ group behind the junta. The cover of the book displayed a never-before published photograph of Giorgios Papadopoulos, which the coup later installed as dictator, on a hunting trip with Greek American CIA agents.

In 2009, he was awarded together with Tasos Telloglou and Sofia Papaioannou with the Best Newscast Award, "Fredi Germanos", for the show "Neoi Fakelloi", at the ""Prosopa" TV Awards. In 2013, he was invited to the Bilderberg Club conference. In 2014, was granted the "John Dewey Award for Distinguished Public Service" from Bard College awarded annually to alumni of the college fore extraordinary contributions to the public interest. In 2015, he ranked 15th among the most influential Europeans in POLITICO magazine's list.

He has contributed columns for The New York Times and the Guardian.

== Bibliography ==
Papahelas has written two books, touching sensitive aspects of Greek recent history

- Ο βιασμός της Ελληνικής Δημοκρατίας (The Rape of Greek Democracy - The American Factor) (1997) – About the Greek military junta of 1967–1974.
- Φάκελος 17 Νοέμβρη (Folder 17 November) (2002) – Co-authored with Tasos Telloglou, about the Revolutionary Organization 17 November.
