= Helen Vlachos =

Greek journalist (1911–1995)

- Ελένη Βλάχου
- Born: 18 December 1911; Athens, Kingdom of Greece
- Died: 14 October 1995 (aged 83); Athens, Greece
- Occupations: Journalist, author

Helen Vlachos (UK: /ˈvlækɒs/, US: /ˈvlækoʊs/; Greek: Ελένη Βλάχου, Eléni Vláchou; 18 December 1911 – 14 October 1995) was a Greek journalist, newspaper publishing heiress, proprietor, and anti-junta activist.

Soon after the coup of 21 April 1967, she closed down her newspaper Kathimerini as a protest against the dictatorship. In October 1967, her description of one of the junta principals, Brigadier Stylianos Pattakos, then Minister of the Interior of the junta, as a clown, led to her house arrest, for which she later wrote a book under the same title.

For her refusal to acquiesce to the Greek junta's demands that she censor her publications, her resistance against the regime of the colonels, and her contributions to freedom of the press, she was posthumously recognised as one of the World Press Freedom Heroes by the International Press Institute.

== Life ==
Helen Vlachos (Eléni Vláchou) was the daughter of Georgios Vlachos, who founded Kathimerini, one of Greece's premier newspapers, in 1919. She worked as a journalist in her father's newspaper and covered the Berlin Olympics in 1936. During World War II, her father refused to cooperate with the Nazi occupation government and closed down Kathimerini. During the war she worked as a nurse.

After the war, Helen Vlachos resumed working in her father's newspaper as a columnist. Her column was simply titled "E", for "Eleni", her name in Greek. She became very popular in Greece because she often used to criticise the government from her column.

When her father died in 1951, she took ownership of Kathimerini (Daily) and expanded it by publishing the afternoon edition of the paper under the name Mesimvrini (Noon edition). She published Eikones (Pictures), which was an illustrated magazine and the first of its kind in Greece. She also launched Ekdosis Galaxia (English, "galaxy publishers"), a quality paperback imprint, which became collectible. She had been a supporter of the monarchy and the Greek right-wing parties.

=== Life under the colonels ===
"They cannot tell me how to run my newspapers any more than I can tell them how to run their tanks"
Helen Vlachos

The coup d'état of 21 April 1967, which overthrew the legitimate government of Greece, started at 2 a.m. local time. Soon after the coup had begun, Vlachos arrived at the offices of Kathimerini in the early hours of the morning, in complete shock, surprise and disarray, to plan the publication of what was to be the only edition of her newspaper during the dictatorship and started to organise the photographic and other recorded material which was to be included in that special edition.

She realised that in the future such material could prove crucial in documenting the events which, according to her evaluation based on her experience of events centred around World War II, could have led to a possible new catastrophe for Greece. The next day, Vlachos, not willing to submit to the censorship demanded by the junta, decided to close down her newspapers and her magazine Eikones as a sign of protest against the dictators and their repressive measures.

The suspension of the publication of her papers was a great disappointment for the dictators, as well as a political blow against them, because it deprived them of the means to gain support and acceptance from the mainstream right of Greek politics by using her established and well-respected publications such as her newspaper Kathimerini to promote their agenda. Further, the junta never expected that the owner of a right-wing newspaper would go against them and they were very surprised when she did. Her action of closing her papers was among the first overt signs of resistance against the junta.

The junta then tried to pressure her to republish her newspapers but she steadfastly refused choosing instead to criticise them at every opportunity. She even resisted pressure from Papadopoulos himself who actually threatened her and did not reply to his comments, keeping silent. During a later interview titled Eleni Vlachou: A journalist remembers, with ERT, the national broadcast company of Greece, she said that by not responding to the junta pressure her "silence was her loudest voice". She also dismissed the junta demands by declaring: "They cannot tell me how to run my newspapers any more than I can tell them how to run their tanks".

Despite her closing of her papers, she still went regularly to her office at the building of her publishing company where she frequently expressed her opinions against the junta. She also gave interviews to the Italian Press where she used to call the junta a circus.

In an interview with the Italian newspaper La Stampa she described the junta members by saying: "All in all they are mediocre and colourless, except of course Pattakos. He is a mediocre man who acts like a clown". As far as the regime's strongman Georgios Papadopoulos was concerned, Vlachos told La Stampa that she feared him less than "going to the dentist".

The interview to La Stampa proved too much for the dictators, who sent the police to her house to summon her to appear in front of the Athens Military Court where she was interrogated for four hours. At the end of the interrogation she was told that a date would be scheduled for her trial by the end of October. Hearing that she exclaimed: "This is going to be a lot of fun!".

Such attacks against the junta could have led to imprisonment or worse, yet she was not intimidated saying that should she ever go to jail she was expecting to be fed her favourite dish, which was meatballs. In October 1967, her description of one of the junta principals, Brigadier Stylianos Pattakos then Minister of the Interior of the junta, as a clown, led to her house arrest, for which she later wrote a book under the same title.

=== Escape to London ===
Following her house arrest, in December 1967, she devised a plan to escape. She obtained a fake passport and dyed her hair black with shoe polish to match the false identification. On the night of the escape, the 55-year-old climbed out of a window from her flat and then to the roof of a neighbouring apartment and, going from roof to roof in a cold Athens night, she finally managed to reach street level.

She went into hiding in an Athens bordello while her husband, Konstantinos Loundras, wearing the high heels of his wife, paced about their apartment trying to fool the police into thinking his wife was still in the apartment.

Two days later she was on her way to London, having successfully escaped from house arrest with the help of her friend Leslie Finer, an author who worked at the Greek Embassy in Washington and who arranged a secret British flight for her.

In Britain, she was granted political asylum. Soon after she started her anti-junta campaign from exile. To that end she formed an alliance with anti-junta activists Melina Mercouri and Amalia Fleming, Greek widow of Sir Alexander Fleming, the discoverer of pennicilin.

She loved Britain and the British people and used her fluency in the English language and its idioms to deliver witty attacks against the junta, knowing that the British public appreciates humour rather than exaggeration. In 1970 she published House Arrest, a book detailing her life under the junta before her escape to London.

In London, she became editor of the Hellenic Review, a journal for the Greek expatriates in Britain. While working at the journal she got hold of a leaked document detailing the propaganda activities of the junta in London. The leaked document implicated Gordon Bagier, a British MP who had become a paid lobbyist for the junta. This created a major political storm which embarrassed the junta and further damaged its reputation. The incident also led eventually to the creation of the Register of Members' Interests in the British Parliament.

=== Return to Greece ===
In 1974 with the fall of the junta, she returned to Greece and restarted the publication of her newspapers. She became state deputy for New Democracy under Konstantinos Karamanlis in Greece's first democratically elected Parliament during Metapolitefsi.

Later she resigned from her political position because she found politics boring compared to journalism.

In May 1987, she sold Kathimerini to George Koskotas a year before the Koskotas scandal unravel. In the 1990s, she published her memoirs Peninda kai Kati: Dimosiographika Chronika (Fifty Something: Journalistic Chronicles), alluding to her more than sixty-year career in the newspaper business. She had two homes located in Athens and London and spent her retirement years travelling between them.

She died on 14 October 1995 in Athens, aged 83. She received a state funeral attended by political leaders and hundreds of journalists.

== Recognition ==
Eleni Vlachou is recognised as one of the World Press Freedom Heroes, an award sponsored by the International Press Institute. She received the award posthumously in 2000.

In response to her death, the Prime Minister of Greece Andreas Papandreou said about her: "She was a truly great figure in Greek journalism... She was unwavering in her principles and her beliefs... Her immediate reaction to the coup of 21 April 1967, with the cessation of publication of Kathimerini and her other publications, is a crowning moment of resistance in the field of journalism."

A prize named in her honour "The Eleni Vlachou Award" is presented every two years starting from 2003 to Greek journalists by the German embassy in Greece for excellence in journalism covering European and international topics.

== Marriage ==
In 1935, Vlachos married Ioannis Arvanitidis. Vlachos and Arvanitidis later divorced. In 1951, she remarried, to Konstantinos Loundras.
