= 2010 Greek truck drivers' strike =

The 2010 Greek truck drivers' strike was carried out in Greece by the truck driving industry to protest against the austerity measures set out by the Greek government. It began on July 26, 2010, with over thirty-three thousand Greek truck drivers going on strike, and ended on August 1, 2010. This campaign was part of a larger national protest against the Greek government's austerity measures, which also included raising taxes and cutting public spending.

== Background ==
Greek economic downturn became apparent in 2009 due to several different reasons, including structural weaknesses within the Greek economy and repercussions of the Great Recession. This downturn continued into 2010, causing the Greek Parliament to pass the Economic Recovery Bill on March 5, 2010. An important part of these austerity measures was the decision to open up many professions that were currently closed, such as pharmacists, architects, and truck drivers.

The Greek government developed a draft bill that would open up the truck driving industry to more competition, which would allow them to issue new licenses and revoke the industry's previous system of licensing drivers. Many Greek truck drivers had taken out loans to pay for their license to own and operate trucks (up to $275,000) and the new austerity measures would cause these licenses to be worthless within three years. There was a widespread belief that this new system was unfair, and would devalue the truck drivers' initial investment.

== Timeline ==
On July 26, 2010, thirty-three thousand truck drivers went on strike to protect their status quo and essentially keep their industry closed. They began the strike by refusing to drive and lining their trucks along the sides of roads all throughout Greece. By the second day of the strike, 80% of Greek gas stations had run out of fuel.

On July 28, the third day of the strike, the Greek government issued an emergency order informing the striking truck drivers that they must return to work by Thursday July 29, or risk losing their truck driving licenses. The union ignored this order, and continued the strike.

On July 29, approximately five hundred of the truck drivers participated in a demonstration in which they blocked two roads outside of the transport ministry. Their protesting led to a clash with riot police, who eventually used tear gas to disperse the rioters. Concern began to grow over how the strike was affecting the country, with newspaper reports reviewing how the strike has negatively affected tourism. There also was growing concern due to shortages of food, fuel, and medical supplies, which caused the Greek government to call in military support in order to supply fuel to hospitals, airports, and power stations.

On July 31, strikers and police clashed as strikers attempted to prevent a government fuel truck from leaving an oil refinery. The union leader George Tzortzatos reportedly stated that they would not end the strike, stating "We continue the strike...We will not hold a funeral for our licences, we will fight with all our might to protect our property."

On August 1, six days after the walkout, the strike came to an end. Due to the government threats of criminal prosecution and loss of license for striking truckers, truck drivers voted by a narrow majority to end the strike.

== Conclusion ==
The government did not make any concessions to the truck drivers, as economists agreed that opening the truck driving industry would be beneficial in allowing the country to recover from its economic failures. The strike had a large effect on the tourism industry- thousands of tourists were stranded in Greece, hundreds of tourist reservations were canceled, rental cars were abandoned due to no fuel, with media outlets reporting that tourists had purchased fuel on the black market at three times the rate of the regular price. The strike also damaged the peach industry within Greece, as more than twelve peach canneries were forced to close due to the lack of fuel.

== See also ==
- Nonviolence
- Nonviolent Resistance
- Labor Strike
- Greek government-debt crisis
- Anti-austerity movement in Greece
