= Aristeidis Alafouzos =

Greek entrepreneur and shipowner (1924–2017)

- Born: 9 March 1924; Oia, Santorini, Greece
- Died: 17 May 2017 (aged 93); Athens, Greece
- Resting place: Oia
- Education: National Technical University of Athens
- Occupations: Owner of Glafki Maritime Limited; Owner of Kyklades Maritime Corporation; Owner of Kathimerini Publishing S.A
- Known for: Construction, Shipping; Media
- Spouse: Eleni Valaouris
- Children: Giannis Alafouzos; Themistoklis Alafouzos
- Parent: Ioannis Alafouzos

Aristeidis Alafouzos (Greek: Αριστείδης Αλαφούζος; 9 March 1924 – 17 May 2017) was a Greek shipowner, civil engineer and media mogul. In the media area he was best known for his ownership of the Kathimerini newspaper.

== Early life ==
Alafouzos was born in Oia on the island of Santorini to Ioannis Alafouzos a member of a shipping and political family on the island.

A year after his birth there was a volcanic eruption on the island, which led his family to move to Piraeus, where Aristides went on to study at the Second Piraeus Middle School for Boys, excelling at mathematics. In September 1940 the family relocated to Athens, where he continued his high school education. At this time it was Alafouzos' intention to enter the Hellenic Navy Academy, but as the academy had closed due to the German occupation of Greece he transferred his attention to continuing his education at the National Technical University of Athens (NTUA).

Following the death of his father on 14 December 1941, Alafouzos, to support his family, took a job at a timber company in Malakasa, north of Athens. He left the job in the spring of 1943 to prepare for the entrance exams for the National Technical University of Athens (NTUA), which he passed with top marks. As a result, he was able to obtain a scholarship which covered the cost of all of his studies. The reputation he had gained due to his scholarly performance allowed him to offer private tutorials to other students.

Alafouzos graduated with a degree in civil engineering in 1949, specializing in hydraulic technology in road building and the construction of railroads, ports and industries. His studies had taken six years instead of the customary five as the university had been shut down for a year during the war. To gain practical experience he also worked at a civil engineering firm during the last two years of his studies.

== Career ==
Following the completion of his mandatory military service between 1949 and 1951, Alafouzos was employed as the supervising engineer of construction works in the port of Piraeus. In 1952, Alafouzos was able to obtain from the Greek Ministry of Public Works the first of a series of building contracts. By late 1953, Alafouzos oversaw the construction of a nickel complex in Larymna on the Gulf of Evia.

By August 1954, Alafouzos had managed to save enough money to enter the residential construction business.

By 1956, Alafouzos had amassed enough experience to receive the special license that would allow him to bid for major public works. As a result, in that same year he founded "Aristidis Alafouzos" (which was later renamed "ATE ERGON") which subsequently played an important role in the postwar reconstruction of Greece. The company's notable projects were the Hotel Mont Parnes (later renamed Regency Casino Mont Parnes) on Mount Parnitha overlooking the north western suburbs of Athens and the large Asteras Vouliagmenis luxury hotel on the southern coast of Athens, both of these projects enjoying the patronage of prime minister Constantine Karamanlis. Other significant projects included the construction of the basic infrastructure of the Nestos and Axios valley roads. In the 1960s, the Public Power Corporation entrusted the company with the construction of its power station at Ptolemaida in northern Greece.

This company ceased to operate in the late 1960s, when Alafouzos stopped working as a civil engineer, residing overseas while the country was ruled by the Greek junta between 1967 and 1974.

=== Shipping ===
Prior to giving up engineering Alafouzos had decided in 1964 to carry on the family tradition in shipping which led to him self-financing (with the profits of his engineering business) the purchase of a secondhand ship in 1965. By 1967 he had a fleet of five secondhand tramp steamers and bulk carriers. He opened an office in London, where he lived until April 1988.

In 1967 he ordered two ships from the British shipyard, a cargo ship from a Japanese shipyard, taking delivery of his first new build in 1968. At the same time, he opened an office in Tokyo, that reflected the strong ties he had developed with the Japanese market. He was to also establish an office in Moscow. In 1969, he ordered five ships from a German shipyard.

In the early 1970s Alafouzos founded the Glafki (Hellas) Maritime Company to manage his shipping interests. In 1974, Alafouzos ordered ships of 140,000 dwt capacity of carrying both liquid and dry cargo from Ishikawajima-Harima Heavy Industries, in a joint venture with K-Line.

In 1985 Alafouzos took advantage of the shipping slump to establish Kyklades Maritime Corporation with which he entered the oil tanker market by taking advantage of a crisis in the shipping sector to buy 16 tankers aged between three and 10 years at a very good price By the mid-1980s, Alafouzos’ shipping interests owned 42 new cargo ships, most built in Japan. The company went on to order new ships at the end of the 1980s, acquiring 17 oil tankers. In 2000 Alafouzos had 35 ships in his fleet.

Alafouzos' shipping companies, Glafki Maritime and Kyklades Maritime Corporation have always kept the Greek flag, with both companies among the biggest Greek shipping firms. Both of his children became involved in the companies, with Giannis going on to found the Ermis Maritime Corporation shipping company. During Alafouzos’ shipping career he ordered more than 100 vessels (always with high specifications) from British, German, Japanese, Chinese and Korean shipyards.

=== Media ===
In 1988, Alafouzos entered the world of media, when he purchased the Grammi SA publishing company during the auction sale of the assets of the banker George Koskotas, after the Koskotas scandal. This company published the iconic Greek newspaper Kathimerini. Under Alafouzos, Kathimerini grew in circulation and influence in Greece. Alafouzos was also able to purchase from Koskotas the SKY 100.4 radio station, which he developed into the Skai Group, which grew to become one of Greece's largest media groups, with a television station, three radio stations, a news web portal and a publishing house.

In 1998 the Kathimerini and the International Herald Tribune set up a joint venture to publish the English-language daily Kathimerini in Greece, Cyprus and Albania.

Together with Giorgio Bobolas, Christos Lambrakis, Christos Tegopoulos and Vardis Vardinogiannis, Alafouzos was one of the five founding members of the Teletypos company who created the first private Greek television channel, Mega TV. This began broadcasting in November 1989. Later on Alafouzos left Teletypos.

== Controversy ==
In later years SKAI opposed the government of Konstantinos Mitsotakis, with Alafouzos stating in an interview in October 1993 with the journalist Georgia Kontrarou that their relationship had broken down because the latter was constantly "asking for money" from 1989 elections onwards.

Under Alafouzos' ownerships Kathimerini had a liberal-conservative political orientation. Alafouzos's media companies had controversial relations with the Tsipras led government, mostly centred on the Skai owned radio and TV stations. In 2015 both were boycotted by politicians of the Syriza party for a few days in 2015 and then for a more prolonged one in July 2018 Syriza and Independent Greeks (ANEL) parties in the ruling coalition following criticism of the government's handling of the 2018 Attica wildfires. The boycott ended before the July 2019 elections.

== Philanthropy ==
Alafouzos retained a lifelong affection for Santorini and visited the island frequently, contributing towards the construction of a modern hospital on the island and in 1992 donating a desalination plant to provide drinking water to Oia. He also lent his support to excavations at the prehistoric settlement of Akrotiri.

Alafouzos and his wife financially contributed to the creation of an outpatient cancer clinic at Athens's Sotiria Hospital. Because of Alafouzos and his wife's support the unit was subsequently named after Lena Alafouzos in 2013.

== Honours ==
In December 2015 he was awarded the Lloyd's List/Propeller Club Lifetime Achievement Award at the Lloyd's List Greek Shipping Awards." He was also honored with the "Order of the Rising Sun" by the Emperor of Japan and with the honorary title of "Friendship Ambassador" by the Chinese government.

== Death ==
Alafouzos died on 17 May 2017 at the age of 93. Following his funeral in Athens he was buried in Oia.

== Personal life ==
Alafouzos married Eleni "Lena" Valaouris in 1955. Eleni who had been born in 1929 died in 2012.

Their son, Giannis, was born in 1957, and Themistocles was born the following year.
