= Georgios Vlachos =

Greek journalist and publisher (1886–1951)

Georgios A. Vlachos (Greek: Γεώργιος Α. Βλάχος; 1886–1951) was a Greek journalist, founder of Kathimerini newspaper and a prominent antivenizelist.

He was born in Athens and studied law. His father was a writer and politician Angelos Vlachos. In 1915, as a young journalist at the newspaper Chronos during the Noemvriana events, he supported that the Greek army units should not surrender arms to the French admiral. He was one of the strongest critics of Venizelos during the period of National Schism and in summer 1917 was put in internal exile by the Venizelists.

In 1919 he founded Kathimerini. In summer 1922, days before the destruction at the front in the Greco-Turkish war, he published two articles ("Oikade" -To Home- and "Pomeranians"), calling for peace and the Greek army to retreat for the coming winter. For these articles he almost escaped trial after the Venizelist revolution of 1922, which led to the Execution of the Six.

He later supported Metaxas and the 4th of August Regime. After the Italian attack in October 1940, he wrote his famous article "The dagger" and later an article-public letter to Adolf Hitler. During World War II, he refused to cooperate with the Nazi occupation government; he retired and passed Kathimerini to the personnel. With the liberation, and during the Dekemvriana events, he was one of the strongest critics of the communists.

He wrote also some theatrical plays. His daughter was Helen Vlachos.
