= Dimitris Christoulas =

Greek Pensioner

Dimitris Christoulas was a Greek pensioner who committed suicide in Syntagma Square in Athens on April 4, 2012.

Christoulas left behind the following suicide note:

“The Tsolakoglou (The collaborationist occupation government established after the Nazi Germany invasion of Greece during World war two) government has annihilated all traces for my survival, which was based on a very dignified pension that I alone paid for 35 years with no help from the state. And since my advanced age does not allow me a way of dynamically reacting (although if a fellow Greek were to grab a Kalashnikov, I would be right behind him), I see no other solution than this dignified end to my life, so I don’t find myself fishing through garbage cans for my sustenance. I believe that young people with no future, will one day take up arms and hang the traitors of this country at Syntagma square, just like the Italians did to Mussolini in 1945″

== Biography ==
Dimitris Christoulas, born in 1935, 77 years old at the time of his death, was a retired pharmacist who sold his pharmacy in 1994 and had been experiencing both financial and health problems, including difficulty paying for his medications, when the Greek government austerity measures slashed his pension. Before his death, he had posted a sign outside his apartment that stated, "Can’t pay, won’t pay," and his last words before shooting himself were "I am not committing suicide, they are killing me." He was divorced, and is survived by his ex-wife and a daughter, Emi Christoulas, who spoke at his funeral.

As known from the testimony of his daughter and neighbors, Dimitris Christoulas was an active political person. According to the same sources, he was a gentle, cultured man.

The secular funeral was held on April 7 in the First Cemetery of Athens, while his body, as was his last desire, had to be moved to Bulgaria in order to be cremated, Cremation has been legal in Greece since 2006 but has still not been made available.

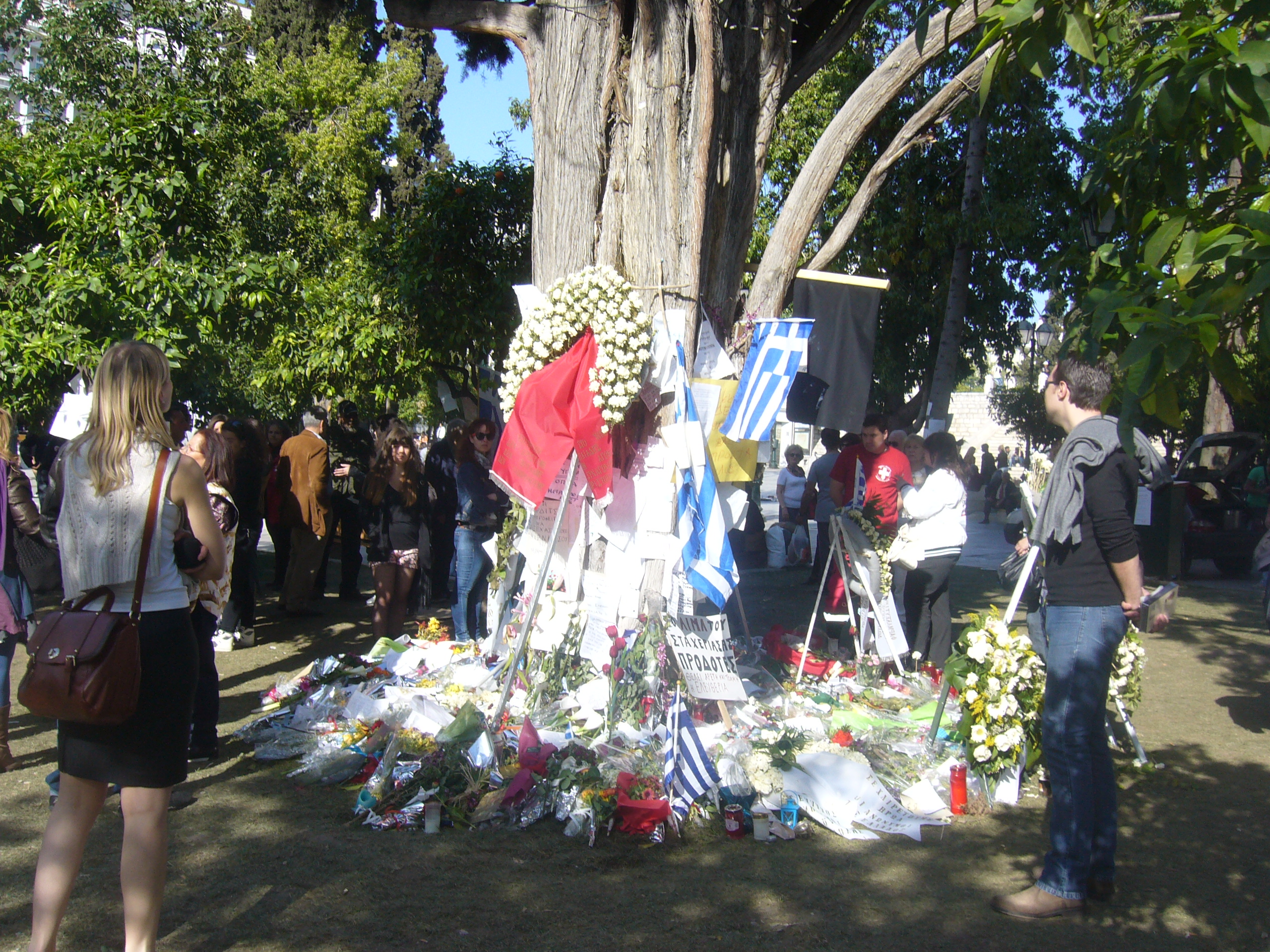
The tree where Dimitris Christoulas committed suicide, Plenty of notes, wreaths and Greek flags (Syntagma Square Sunday April 8, 2012)
