= Skai Group =

Greek media group

- Type: Broadcast radio, television and online
- Country: Greece
- Availability: National; International
- Revenue: 62.682.363 € (2021)
- Net income: 3.909.381 € (2021)
- Headquarters: Piraeus, Greece
- Owner: News Dot Com Radio, Television and Commercial Company for the Provision of Information and Briefing
- Key people: Giannis Alafouzos (Chairperson)
- Launch date: 1989 (radio); 1993 (television); 2006 (online); 2008 (publications)
- Official website: www.skai.gr/skai-group/

Skai Group (News Dot Com S.A.) is one of the largest private media groups in Greece. It consists of one national television station, five radio stations, three web portals and one publishing house. The media group is connected with "Nees Kathimerines Ekdoseis Single Member S.A." which publishes the Greek newspaper Kathimerini.

== Media ==
=== Television ===
- Skai TV: Free-to-air television station with national coverage broadcasting in Greece.

=== Radio ===
- Skai 100.3: News radio station.
- Bwin Sport FM 94,6: Sports radio station.
- Pepper 96,6: Foreign alternative music radio station.
- Menta Radio 88: Greek orchestral music radio station.
- Happy 104: Foreign mainstream music radio station.

=== Internet ===
- skai.gr: News web portal.
- skaitv.gr: Skai TV web portal.
- skairadio.gr: Skai 100.3 web portal.

=== Publications ===
- Skai Book: The publishing house of the group. It was created in July 2008. Its publications are connected with the programs of Skai TV or with the parallel actions of the group.

== Parallel actions ==
Skai Group has organized many actions relative to the protection of the environment such as reforestation actions, actions to clean territories in Athens (Cephissus cleaning). After the big fire in Parnitha National Park during 2007 Greek forest fires, Skai Group along with Kathimerini and WWF Hellas have established "Parnitha Observatory" an action to inform people about the restoration of the burned areas. Since the beginning of 2010, Skai Group carries out an ongoing social campaign, known as Oloi Mazi Boroume (English translation: Together We Can), focused on raising public awareness and organizing events regarding various social matters in Greece. Examples of such events are; clothes collection for the poor, food collection for soup kitchens around Greece (run by the Greek Church) serving indigents, weekly medicine collection drives all over Greece for the uninsured. The campaign has a close collaboration to the Greek Orthodox Church, in almost all its nationwide operations, aiming to help victims of the Greek government-debt crisis.

"Skai Periballon" (English translation: Skai Environment) is the name for all environmental actions Skai Group organizes; such events include tree planting, tree watering, recycling electrical appliances and a lot of accessories and volunteer clean-up actions in various locations around Greece such as: beaches, forests, archaeological sites, villages, popular landmarks, etc.

== See also ==
- Skai 100.3
- Skai TV
