= Skai 100.3 =

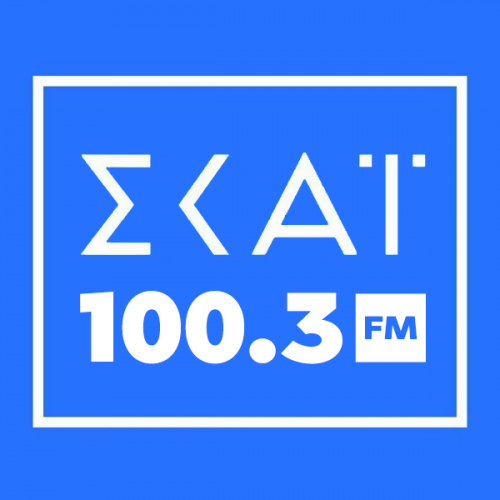

Piraeus; Greece
- Broadcast area: Attica
- Frequency: 100.3 MHz
- Branding: Skai 100.3

Programming
- Language: Greek
- Format: News & Entertainment

Ownership
- Owner: Skai Group

History
- First air date: 1989
- Former call signs: Sky 100.4 (1989–1993); Skai 100.4 (1993–2000)
- Former frequencies: 100.4 MHz (1989–2000); 100.7 MHz (1989–2001); 100.6 MHz (2000–2006)
- Call sign meaning: Skai 100.3

Links
- Website: www.skairadio.gr

Skai 100.3 (or Skai Radio) is a Greek informational and entertainment radio station, the larger an audience in Greece, that broadcasts a wide variety of spoken-word programs, including news, sports, culture, and comedy.

Skai 100.3 is part of the Skai Group one of the largest media groups in Greece. From its beginning in 1989 (then called Sky 100.4) has been in cooperation with BBC World Service, Deutsche Welle and Voice of America. In 2007, joined forces with other European radio stations for the creation of Euranet. The CEO of SKAI 100.3 is Aris Portosalte, a notable journalist well known for his commentary on the news of Skai TV. He has a morning show.

== Logos ==
23.09.2006–08.08.2009

09.08.2009–10.09.2018

10.09.2018–13.12.2018

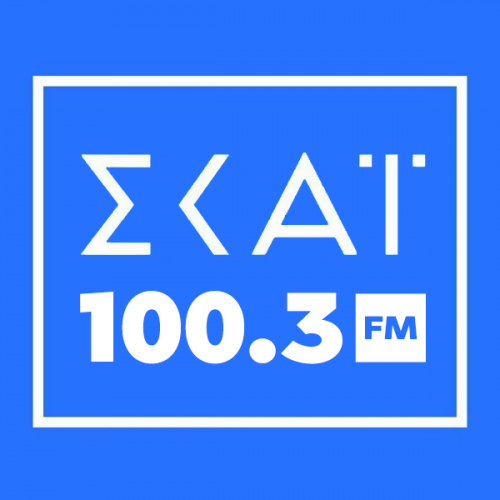
13.12.2018–present

== See also ==
- Skai TV
- Skai Group
