= Particracy =

Form of government

Particracy, also known as partitocracy or partocracy, is a form of government in which the political parties are the primary basis of rule rather than citizens or individual politicians.

As argued by Italian political scientist Mauro Calise in 1994, the term is often derogatory, implying that parties have too much power—in a similar vein, in premodern times it was often argued that democracy was merely rule by the demos, or a poorly educated and easily misled mob. Efforts to turn particracy into a more precise scholarly concept so far appear partly successful.

Spanish political scientist Antonio García-Trevijano described particracy in 2010 as a form of government where representation, general will and separation of powers are nullified by the way the political party system is organized, turning democracy into an "oligarchy of parties" where voters have little to no actual control over them.

== Rationale and types ==
Particracy tends to install itself as the cost of electoral campaigning and the impact of media increase. Thus particracy can be prevalent at the national level (with large electoral districts) but absent at a local level; a few prominent politicians of renown may hold enough influence on public opinion to resist their party or to dominate it.

The ultimate particracy is the one-party state, although some might consider a political party in this situation not a "true" party, since it does not perform the democratic function of competing with other parties. (Note: Compare democratic centralism.) Exclusive one-party rule is often installed by law, while in multi-party states particracy cannot be imposed or effectively prevented by law.

In multi-party régimes, the degree of individual autonomy for members or factions within each political party can vary according to party rules and traditions, and depending on whether a party is in power, and if so alone (mostly in a de facto two party-system) or in a coalition. The mathematical need to form a coalition on the one hand prevents a single party from getting a potentially total grip on power; on the other hand it provides the perfect excuse not to be accountable to voters for not delivering the party-program promises.

== Examples ==
The party system which developed in the Federal Republic of Germany after World War II provides examples of particracies. More explicitly than in most European parliamentary systems, parties play a dominant role in the German Federal Republic's politics, far outstripping the role of individuals. Article 21 of the Basic Law states that "the political parties shall participate in the forming of the political will of the people. They may be freely established. Their internal organization must conform to democratic principles. They must publicly account for the sources of their funds." The 1967 "Law on Parties" further solidified the role of parties in the political process and addressed party organization, membership rights, and specific procedures, such as the nomination of candidates for office. The educational function noted in Article 21 (participation in the "forming of the political will") suggests that parties should help define public opinion rather than simply carry out the wishes of the electorate.

On the other side of the Iron Curtain, the former German Democratic Republic (or East Germany, 1949–1990) was hardly democratic, but at least in theory more democratic than the USSR insofar as the dominant Socialist Unity Party allowed the existence of eternally minority small interest-group parties in the National Front.

In the West, the United States, in which the Democratic and the Republican parties have been in power continuously since before the American Civil War, could be viewed as a particracy or, as in Safire definition, as a political machine.

Particracy is one of the reasons for the 2010–2011 Greek protests.

Some scholars have characterized the Mexican PRI party as a "state party" or as a "perfect dictatorship" for ruling Mexico for over 70 years (1929–2000), later losing power for 12 years against the PAN party, regaining it in 2012 just to lose it again in 2018 against Morena.

The Republic of Ireland can also be seen as a particracy. Since the foundation of the state, one of two parties – Fianna Fáil and Fine Gael – has always led the government, either on its own or in coalition. Fianna Fáil is one of the most successful political parties in history. From the formation of the first Fianna Fáil government on 9 March 1932 until the election of 2011, the party was in power for 61 of 79 years. Fine Gael held power during the remaining years.

In South Africa, the African National Congress has been the ruling party ever since the first free and fair elections in 1994, despite several high-profile controversies over the years.

Brazil could also be considered a particracy, and some consider the country a plutocracy. Similar political machines have been described in Latin America, where the system has been called clientelism or political clientelism (after the similar clientela relationship in the Roman Republic), especially in rural areas, and also in some African states and other emerging democracies, like postcommunist Eastern European countries.

The Swedish Social Democrats have also been referred, to a certain extent, as a "political machine", thanks to its strong presence in "popular houses".

Japan's Liberal Democratic Party is often cited as another political machine, maintaining power in suburban and rural areas through its control of farm bureaus and road construction agencies. In Japan, the word jiban (literally "base" or "foundation") is the word used for political machines. For decades, the LDP was able to dominate rural constituencies by spending massive amounts of money for rural areas, forming clientelist bonds with many groups and especially agriculture. This lasted until the 1990s when it was abandoned after becoming less effective. Japanese political factional leaders are expected to distribute mochidai, literally snack-money, meaning funds to help subordinates win elections. For the annual end-year gift in 1989 Party Headquarters gave $200,000 to every member of the Diet. Supporters ignore wrongdoing to collect the benefits from the benefactor, such as money payments distributed by politicians to voters in weddings, funerals, New year parties among other events. Political ties are held together by marriages between the families of elite politicians. Nisei, second generation political families, have grown increasingly numerous in Japanese politics, due to a combination of name-recognition, business contacts and financial resources, and the role of personal political machines.

== Italian partitocrazia ==
It has been alleged that Italian parties have retained too much power in the First Republic, screening the choices citizens had in elections; this electoral law would reinstate fixed electoral lists, where voters can express a preference for a list but not for a specific candidate. This can be used by parties to guarantee virtual re-election to unpopular but powerful figures, who would be weaker in a first-past-the-post electoral system.

The nearly pure proportional representation system of the First Republic had resulted not only in political fragmentation and therefore governmental instability, but also insulation of the parties from the electorate and civil society. This was known in Italian as partitocrazia, in contrast to democracy, and resulted in corruption and pork-barrel politics. The Italian constitution allows, with substantial hurdles, abrogative referendums, enabling citizens to delete laws or parts of laws passed by Parliament (with exceptions).

A reform movement known as COREL (Committee to Promote Referendums on Elections), led by maverick Christian Democracy member Mario Segni, proposed three referendums, one of which was allowed by the Constitutional Court of Italy (at that time packed with members of the Italian Socialist Party and hostile to the movement). The June 1991 referendum therefore asked voters if they wanted to reduce the number of preferences, from three or four to one in the Chamber of Deputies to reduce the abuse of the open-list system by party elites and ensure accurate delegation of parliamentary seats to candidates popular with voters. With 62.5% of the Italian electorate voting, the referendum passed with 95% of those voting in favor. This was seen as a vote against the partitocrazia, which had campaigned against the referendum.

Emboldened by their victory in 1991 and encouraged by the unfolding Mani pulite scandals and the substantial loss of votes for the traditional parties in the 1992 general elections, the reformers pushed forward with another referendum, abrogating the proportional representation system of the Italian Senate and implicitly supporting a plurality system that would theoretically force parties to coalesce around two ideological poles, thereby providing governmental stability. This referendum was held in April 1993 and passed with the support of 80% of those voting. This caused the Giuliano Amato government to collapse three days later.

== See also ==
- Dominant-party system
- One-party state
- Two-party system
- Party-state capitalism
- Uniparty
