= SONAPS =

SONAPS or Sonaps is a network TV production system by Sony. It allows planning, ingesting, editing and playback of video material. The main focus are News programs. An essential part of Sonaps is the professional non-linear video editing system XPRI NS. Sonaps can be used with already existing network infrastructure. Standard video format is the Media Exchange Format (MXF).

Sonaps supplies an own nearline archive and interfaces to 3rd party archive systems. Through the MOS (Media Object Server) gateway it can be connected to NRCS (Newsroom Computer Systems) and other network production systems.
