= Skai TV =

Greek television channel

- Country: Greece
- Broadcast area: Greece
- Headquarters: Piraeus, Greece

Programming
- Language: Greek
- Picture format: 1080i HDTV (downscaled to 16:9 576i for the SDTV feed)

Ownership
- Owner: Skai Group
- Sister channels: Sigma TV

History
- Launched: 21 September 1993; 1 April 2006 (relaunch)
- Replaced: Seven TV (1989–2006)
- Replaced by: Alpha TV (1999–present)

Links
- Website: SKAI TV

Availability

Terrestrial
- Digea: All over Greece at local frequencies

Streaming media
- Skai TV Online: Watch live

Skai TV (Greek: ΣΚΑΪ) is a Greek free-to-air television network based in Piraeus, operating under Skai Group. It has been broadcasting since 2006 and is available via digital terrestrial transmission, as well as subscription-based services such as Nova and Cosmote TV. The network is a member of Digea, a consortium overseeing digital terrestrial broadcasting in Greece.

Initially, Skai TV dubbed foreign-language content into Greek but later shifted to using subtitles for most foreign programs. This was a departure from common practice in Greek television, where subtitles are generally reserved for specific types of programming.

== History ==
Skai TV first launched on September 21, 1993, focusing on news and sports. In 1999, the network was sold and rebranded as Alpha TV, shifting towards general entertainment. In 2006, the original Skai TV brand was reintroduced after the acquisition of Seven TV, a struggling broadcaster. The revived Skai TV emphasized news and foreign programming.

The network expanded to the NOVA Greece digital platform in 2007 and introduced a high-definition feed in 2016. Skai TV was among the broadcasters awarded a national television license in Greece, with its owner, Giannis Alafouzos, securing the license for €43.6 million.

== Criticism ==
Skai TV has been criticized for its news coverage, with accusations of bias and alignment with specific political and corporate interests. Some critics argue that its reporting supports a pro-EU, liberal stance, while others have pointed to perceived favoritism toward certain political figures and policies.

In 2008, the network’s handling of a hostage crisis drew scrutiny, with claims that its coverage contributed to escalating tensions. Statements by journalists associated with the network have also sparked debate over its editorial stance.

== Technology ==
Skai TV transitioned early to digital broadcasting, implementing the SONAPS network broadcast system by Sony and replacing tape-based workflows. It also uses Harmonic Spectrum servers in its operations. The station was among the first in Greece to adopt a 16:9 broadcast format.

== Programming ==
Skai TV airs a mix of foreign and local content, including news, documentaries, and entertainment. The network has agreements with international broadcasters such as National Geographic, Discovery Channel, and BBC. It also airs a Greek-dubbed BBC World News segment after its own news broadcast.

== Sports broadcasting rights ==
Football

- Super League Greece
  - Home matches of Panathinaikos F.C.
  - Home matches of Iraklis F.C. (Thessaloniki)
- (Greece) Greek Football Cup
- (Greece) Greek Super Cup

Basketball

- (Greece) Greek Basketball League

== Skai HD ==
Skai TV broadcasts high-definition broadcasting via Cosmote TV and online platforms. Plans for an HD channel on digital terrestrial television were announced in 2014 but were delayed until February 2016.

== Skai International ==
In 2013, Skai TV expanded its reach into North America through agreements with local broadcasters. It partnered with New Greek TV for distribution in the United States and launched in Canada through the Ethnic Channels Group on Bell Fibe TV. However, as of 2016, Skai TV programming is no longer available in North America.

== Logos ==
1993–1998

2006–2009

2009–2018

2018–present

== See also ==
- Skai 100.3
- Skai Group
