= Kathimerini =

Greek-language daily newspaper

I Kathimerini

- The newspaper's 10 August 2005 front page
- Type: Daily newspaper
- Format: Broadsheet
- Owner: Nees Kathimerines Ekdoseis Single Member S.A. (100% Themistoklis Alafouzos)
- Founder: Georgios Vlachos
- Publisher: Themistoklis Alafouzos
- Managing editor: Alexis Papahelas
- Founded: 1919
- Political alignment: Conservatism; Economic liberalism Pro-Europeanism
- Headquarters: Falireos kai Makariou 2, 185-47, Neo Faliro, Piraeus, Athens
- Country: Greece
- Website: kathimerini.gr

Kathimerini (Greek: Η Καθημερινή, [i.kaθimeriˈni]; lit. 'The Daily') is a daily political and financial morning newspaper published in Piraeus, Athens. Its first edition was printed on 15 September 1919. Kathimerini is considered a newspaper of record, and is a leading newspaper in Greece, with the highest circulation, as well as a strong digital presence.

A Cypriot edition in Greek is published on Sundays. An English edition is published in Greece and Cyprus along with the New York Times International. Kathimerini also produces a wide range of leading magazines, including Vogue Greece with Conde Nast International and publications for The Walt Disney Company Greece.

Considered a high-quality broadsheet, Kathimerini began as hard-line conservative; however, it has since identified with a broad range of the political spectrum, from traditional liberalism to the main conservative right-wing, while covering the positions and hosting analyses from all the main political parties and opinions from columnists with different points of view.

== History ==
Kathimerini is a newspaper title with over 100 years of history. It was founded by Georgios Vlachos, a prominent antivenizelist, in 1919 and was later inherited by his daughter Helen Vlachos (Eléni Vláchou) and her husband, retired submarine commander Constantine Loundras. Kathimerini was traditionally perceived as one of the main conservative voices of Greek media. The newspaper was highly critical of Eleftherios Venizelos in the early 20th century, and also opposed Georgios Papandreou in the postwar years.

It maintains a traditional layout, with its original griffin logo, and incorporates printed supplements in its Sunday edition. Eleni Vlachou sold the company shortly before her death to George Koskotas, who wanted to control the mass media landscape in favor of Andreas Papandreou and his socialist party. As the Koskotas scandal was unraveling, Aristeidis Alafouzos, bought Kathimerini newspaper in 1988, pulling it out of a spiral of decline to turn it into one of the country's leading dailies, both in terms of circulation and its influence on economic developments, with an international reputation. Throughout his life, Aristeidis Alafouzos entered the challenging businesses of construction, shipping and publishing and emerged champion in all three.

In October 1995, Kathimerini was assessed as Greece's "nearest equivalant [sic] to a newspaper of record". It was later considered a newspaper of record. Alafouzos died in 2017 and was succeeded by his son Themistoklis Alafouzos.

== Circulation ==
Kathimerini's daily edition circulation figures are unavailable since the newspaper has prohibited press agencies from releasing such data. Its Sunday edition had a circulation of 95,007 in January 2014.

== Editing staff ==
- Managing editor: Alexis Papahelas

== Company ==
Kathimerini is published by Nees Kathimerines Ekdoseis Single Member S.A. and was previously listed on the Athens Stock Exchange but it was delisted in December 2015.
