= List of Greek-language television channels =

The list of Greek-language television channels includes the following channels:

== Domestic channels ==
=== Public national channels (free-to-air, ERT) ===
- ERT1
- ERT2 Sport
- ERT3
- ERT News
- Vouli TV (programming produced by the Hellenic Parliament)

=== Private national channels (free-to-air, Digea) ===
- Alpha TV
- ANT1
- Makedonia TV
- Mega Channel
- Open TV
- Skai TV
- Star Channel

==== Private subscription channels ====
===== Telekom =====
- Magenta Cinema (3 channels)
- Magenta Series
- Magenta Series Marathon
- Magenta History
- Magenta Sport (9 channels)
- Magenta Sport 4K
- Magenta Sport Highlights
- Magenta Sport Olympiacos Super League Pass
- Magenta Sport Panathinaikos Super League Pass
- Magenta Sport AEK Super League Pass
- Magenta TV Promo
- MAD Viral (Affiliate channel with MAD TV)
- Sirina Entertainment (Premium adult service)
- Village Cinema

===== Nova =====
- MAD Greekz (Affiliate channel with MAD TV)
- Nova Cinema (Premium service with 4 channels)
- Nova Life
- Novasports (Premium service with 6 channels)
- Novasports News
- Novasports Start
- Novasports Prime
- Novasports Premier League
- Novasports Extra (4 channels)

==== Foreign-owned specialty channels ====
- Animal Planet Europe (Nova)
- BabyTV
- Cartoonito (Nova)
- Crime & Investigation
- Discovery Channel (Nova)
- Disney Channel
- Disney Jr.
- Duck TV
- DW-TV
- E!
- Euronews
- Eurosport 1 (Nova)
- Eurosport 2 (Nova)
- Extreme Sports Channel (Nova)
- FashionTV
- FX Greece
- FX Life
- Ginx TV (Telekom)
- History (Nova)
- Hustler TV
- Luxe.tv (Telekom)
- Mezzo TV (Telekom)
- National Geographic Greece
- National Geographic Wild
- Stingray CMusic (Telekom)
- Stingray iConcerts (Telekom)
- TCM Movies (Telekom)
- TLC (Nova)
- Travel Channel (Nova)

==== Greek-owned specialty channels ====
- Mega News
- Smile TV

=== Local channels ===
==== Athens - Attica ====
- Action 24 - Marousi
- Alert TV - Tavros
- ART - Kallithea
- Attica TV - Aspropyrgos
- Blue Sky - Irakleio
- Extra Channel - Peristeri
- High TV - Athens
- Keedoo - Nea Ionia
- Kontra Channel - Tavros
- MAD TV - Pallini
- Naftemporiki - Piraeus
- One Channel - Athens
- RISE TV - Irakleio
- Vergina 1 - Rizoupoli

==== Thessaloniki - Central Macedonia ====
- 4E TV - Ampelokipoi
- a.Epsilon TV - Thessaloniki
- Dion TV - Thessaloniki
- Euro TV - Kilkis and Evosmos
- Gnomi TV - Thessaloniki
- Keedoo Plus - Thessaloniki
- Pontos TV - Thessaloniki
- TV 100 - Municipality of Thessaloniki
- Vergina TV - Thessaloniki

==== Eastern Macedonia and Thrace ====
- Alfa TV - Alexandroupolis
- Center TV - Kavala
- Delta TV - Alexandroupolis
- Diktyo TV - Serres
- ENA Channel - Kavala
- Epiloges TV - Serres
- Lydia TV - Kavala
- Orestiada TV (Municipal) - Orestiada
- Smile TV - Xanthi
- Star TV - Drama
- Thraki NET - Alexandroupolis

==== Western Macedonia ====
- Diktyo 1 - Kastoria
- Flash TV - Kozani
- Osios Nikanor - Kastoria
- TOP Channel - Kozani
- West Channel - Kozani

==== Thessaly ====
- Astra TV - throughout the region
- FORMedia - throughout the region
- Smile Plus - Larissa
- Thessalia TV - Karditsa, Larissa and Volos
- TRT - Volos, Larissa and Karditsa

==== Western Greece ====
- Acheloos TV - Agrinio
- Art TV - Arta
- Corfu Channel - Corfu
- Epirus TV1 - Ioannina
- Ioannina TV (ITV) - Ioannina
- Start TV - Corfu
- Vima TV - Ioannina

==== Central Greece ====
- ENA TV - Lamia
- Epsilon TV - Livadeia
- Star Central Greece - Lamia

==== Peloponnese ====
- ART TV - Tripoli
- Best TV - Kalamata
- Electra TV - Corinth
- Ionian Channel - Patras
- Lepanto TV - Nafpaktos and Patras
- Lyxnos TV - Patras
- Mesogeios TV - Kalamata
- ORT - Pyrgos
- Super TV - Corinth

==== North Aegean ====
- Aeolos TV - Mytilene
- Alithia TV - Chios
- Patrida TV - Chios

==== Cyclades ====
- Syros TV1 - Ermoupoli
- Volcano TV - Santorini

==== Dodecanese and Samos ====
- Aigaio TV - Kalymnos
- Irida TV - Rhodes
- Kosmos TV - Ialysos
- Kos TV (Municipal) - Kos
- Samiaki TV - Samos
- Tharri TV (Monastery) - Rhodes

==== Crete ====
- Creta Channel - Heraklion
- CreteTV - Heraklion
- Kriti 1 - Heraklion
- New Television - Chania
- Notos TV - Heraklion
- Sitia TV - Heraklion

== International channels ==
- 4E TV (Europe/Middle East/Australia/Eurasia/South Africa)
- Alpha Sat (USA/Canada/Australia/Middle East)
- ANT1 Europe (Europe)
- ANT1 Pacific (Australia)
- ANT1 Satellite (USA)
- ERT Cosmos (Europe/Australia/Middle East)
- ERT World (Canada)
- Greek Cinema (USA/Canada/Australia)
- Greek Music Television (USA)
- MAD World (USA/Canada/Australia)
- MEGA Cosmos (Canada)
- RIK Sat (USA/Canada/Australia)
- Skai International (USA/Canada/Australia)
- SportPlus TV (USA/Canada)
- Star International (USA/Canada/Australia)

== International local Greek channels ==
- Greek Music Video Hits (USA)
- Greek Orthodox Archdiocese of America (USA)
- Hellenic TV (United Kingdom)
- Montreal Greek TV (Canada)
- New Greek TV (USA)
- Odyssey (Canada)
- Toronto Net TV (Canada)
- WPSO (USA)
- WZRA-CD (USA)

== Defunct channels ==
=== Public channels ===
- DT
- DT HD
- Armed Forces Information Service
- Cine+/Sport+
- Cine+/Studio+
- Prisma+
- Sport+/Info+
- NERIT
- NERIT Sports
- NERIT Plus
- NERIT HD
- ERT Sports

=== Private national channels ===
- 902 TV
- Alter Channel
- Tempo TV

=== Private subscription channels ===
- Fox Sports Turkey
- Greek Business Channel
- Holidays in Greece TV
- K-T.V.
- MTV Music Greece
- Universal Channel

=== Local channels ===
- Achaia Channel
- Channel 9
- MTV Greece
- MTV Plus
- New Epsilon TV
- Nickelodeon Greece
- Nickelodeon Plus
- Patra TV
- PLP
- Social Business Channel
- South Greek TV
- Super B
- Super TV
- Tele Time

=== International channels ===
- Alter Globe (USA/Australia)
- ANT1 Prime (USA)
- Blue (USA/Australia)
- Mega Cosmos (USA/Australia)

== See also ==
- Television in Greece
- Lists of television channels
- List of radio stations in Greece
- Television in Cyprus
