= Nick Jr. (Greek TV programming block) =

Greek children's television programming block

Nick Jr. Greece
- Country: Greece
- Broadcast area: Greece; Cyprus
- Headquarters: Piraeus, Greece

Programming
- Language: Greek
- Picture format: 16:9 (576i, SDTV), (1080i, HDTV)

Ownership
- Sister channels: Nickelodeon (Greece); Nickelodeon Plus

History
- Launched: September 3, 2010; 16 years ago
- Closed: December 31, 2025; 10 months ago

Links
- Website: Official Nickelodeon Greece website at the Wayback Machine (archived 5 January 2026)

Nick Jr. was a long programming block that aired on Nickelodeon Greece aimed at preschoolers. It aired two hours on weekdays and four hours on weekends.

== See also ==
- Nickelodeon (Greece)
- Nickelodeon Plus
- MTV Music (Greece)
- MTV Greece
- MTV+
