= Odyssey (disambiguation) =

The Odyssey is an ancient Greek epic poem attributed to Homer.

Odyssey or The Odyssey may also refer to:

== Arts and media ==
=== Literature ===
==== Books ====
- Odyssey (novel), 2007, by Jack McDevitt
- "Odyssey" (Ulysses part), the middle part of James Joyce's novel Ulysses
- Odyssey: Pepsi to Apple, by former Apple Inc. CEO John Sculley
- The Odyssey: A Modern Sequel, an epic poem by Nikos Kazantzakis
- Isaac Asimov's Robot City: Odyssey, a novel by Michael P. Kube-McDowell
- Odyssey, by Stephen Fry; a retelling of Odysseus's journey

==== Translations of Homer's Odyssey ====
- Odyssey (George Chapman translation), 1614–15
- Odyssey (Alexander Pope translation), 1725–1726
- Odyssey (Richmond Lattimore translation), 1965
- The Odyssey (Emily Wilson translation), 2017

==== Periodicals ====
- Odyssey (children's magazine), a science magazine for children ages 9–14
- Odyssey (publication), an online social content platform styled like a news publication
- Odyssey Magazine (South Africa), a health and lifestyle magazine

==== Other uses in literature ====
- Odyssey Award, a U.S. annual award for best children's or young adult audiobook
- Odyssey Writing Workshop, an annual fantasy-writing workshop at Saint Anselm College in New Hampshire, U.S.

=== Music ===
==== Albums ====
- Odyssey (Barry Guy, Marilyn Crispell, and Paul Lytton album), 2001
- Odyssey (Fischerspooner album), 2005
- Odyssey (Hayley Westenra album), 2005
- Odyssey (Illenium album), 2026
- Odyssey (James Blood Ulmer album) or the title song, 1984
- Odyssey (Ketil Bjørnstad album) or the title song, 1990
- Odyssey (Miles Davis album) or Quintet/Sextet, 1956
- Odyssey (Nubya Garcia album), 2024
- Odyssey (Riize album), 2025
- Odyssey (Take That album), 2018
- Odyssey (Terje Rypdal album), 1975
- Odyssey (Yngwie Malmsteen album), 1988
- Odyssey: The Definitive Collection, by Vangelis, 2003
- Odyssey: The Remix Collection, by Delerium, 2001
- The Odyssey (album), or the title song, by Symphony X, 2002
- Odyssey, by Damo Suzuki, 2000
- Odyssey, by Jay Fung, 2015
- The Odyssey, by David Bedford, 1976

==== Songs ====
- "Odyssey" (song), by Beck and Phoenix, 2023
- "Odyssey", by Dixie Dregs from What If
- "Odyssey", by Johnny Harris
- "Odyssey", by Kaleida
- "Odyssey", by Kiss from Music from "The Elder"
- "Odyssey", by Kyuss from Welcome to Sky Valley
- "Odyssey", by Scale the Summit from The Migration
- "The Odyssey", by Incubus from Halo 2 Original Soundtrack
- "The Odyssey", by Orgy from Vapor Transmission
- "The Odyssey", by SZA from the EP S

==== Other uses in music ====
- Odyssey (band), an American dance band (1968–1987)
- ARP Odyssey, an electronic music synthesizer

=== Films ===
- The Odyssey (1987 film), a 1987 animated film produced by Burbank Films Australia
- The Odyssey (2016 film), a French-Belgian film by Jérôme Salle
- Odyssey (2025 film), a drama by Gerard Johnson
- The Odyssey (2026 film), by Christopher Nolan

=== Television ===
==== Channels ====
- Odyssey Television Network, a Canadian Greek-language broadcasting company
  - Odyssey (TV channel), a Greek-language cable channel operated by the network
- Odyssey Channel, a defunct Australian television channel
- Odyssey Network, a U.S. television network that later became the Hallmark Channel

==== Series ====
- The Odyssey (1968 miniseries), a 1968 Italian-French-German-Yugoslavian miniseries
- The Odyssey (TV series), a 1992–1995 Canadian series
- The Odyssey (1997 miniseries), a 1997 American miniseries
- Mission Odyssey (2002—2003 animated television series series)
- Odyssey (TV series), a 2015 NBC series
- Odyssey 5, a 2002 Canadian series
- Odyssey: Driving Around the World, an American documentary series

==== Episodes and other productions ====
- Star Trek: Odyssey, a Star Trek fan production
- "Odyssey", a three-part episode of Lassie (1961)
- "Odyssey", an episode of Smallville
- "Homer's Odyssey" (The Simpsons), the third full-length episode of The Simpsons
- "The Odyssey" (Arrow), an episode of Arrow
- Lonely Planet: Odyssey, alternate title for the series Graham's World with Graham Hughes, documenting travelling around the world without flying
- "The Odyssey", an episode of Reginald the Vampire

==== Fictional spacecraft ====
- Odyssey, a battlecruiser in the Stargate universe
- Odyssey, a spaceship in the anime series Ulysses 31

=== Gaming ===
- Odyssey series, a series of home video game consoles
  - Magnavox Odyssey, the first commercial home video game console
  - Magnavox Odyssey 2, second generation home video game console
- Odyssey, an expansion to the Elite Dangerous game by Frontier
- Odyssey (Magic: The Gathering), a card game expansion
- Odyssey: The Compleat Apventure, an Apple II role-playing video game
- Odyssey: The Search for Ulysses, a 2000 video game
- Odyssey (play-by-mail game), a heroic fantasy play-by-mail game by Gamer's Den
- Odyssey (cancelled video game), a cancelled survival game developed by Blizzard Entertainment
- Odyssey LRP, a live roleplay game run by Profound Decisions
- Odyssey Engine, a computer game engine
- Odyssey: The Legend of Nemesis, a Macintosh role-playing video game based on the engine of Minotaur: The Labyrinths of Crete
- Odyssey, a virtual world based on the 2010 Summer Youth Olympics
- Super Mario Odyssey, a 2017 platformer
- Assassin's Creed Odyssey, 2018 action-roleplaying game set in Ancient Greece
- LEGO Fortnite Odyssey, a 2023 survival game in the Lego Fortnite collection

=== Other uses in arts and entertainment ===
- Odyssey (WBEZ), a radio talk show in Chicago, U.S.
- Adventures in Odyssey or Odyssey, an Evangelical Christian-themed children's radio series
- The Odyssey (painting), 1850, by Jean Auguste Dominique Ingres

== Businesses ==
- Odyssey BMX, a BMX bicycle parts company
- Odyssey Healthcare, a hospice company
- Odyssey International, a defunct Canadian airline
- Odyssey Marine Exploration, an American underwater salvage company
- Odyssey Productions, an American photography and 3-D computer animation company
- Odyssey (bookstore), a chain of bookstores in India
- Odyssey Golf, a manufacturer of golf putters, acquired by Callaway Golf Company

== Education ==
- Odyssey Academy, a high/middle school in Greece, New York, U.S.
- Odyssey School, a private middle school in San Mateo, California, U.S.
- Odyssey – The Essential School, a high school in SeaTac, Washington, U.S.
- École L'Odyssée, a public high school in Moncton, New Brunswick, Canada
- École publique l'Odyssée, a public high school in North Bay, Ontario, Canada
- Odyssey (education), a Canadian government bursary for language education

== People ==
- Odyssey Sims (born 1992), American basketball player
- Odicci Alexander (born 1998), American softball player
- Odyssey Jones / Oddyssey (born 1994), American professional wrestler
- Ray Odyssey (born 1968), American professional wrestler

== Places ==
- Odyssey Complex, a sports and entertainment complex in Belfast, Northern Ireland
- Odyssey Cinema, St Albans, a restored cinema in the UK
- Odyssey Peak, a mountain in New Zealand

== Technology ==
- Odyssey (launch platform), a self-propelled semi-submersible mobile spacecraft launch platform converted from a mobile drilling rig
- Odysee, a blockchain-based decentralised video sharing platform, operated by LBRY
- Windows Odyssey, an unreleased version of the Microsoft Windows operating system that was combined with Windows Neptune to form Windows XP
- Cybook Odyssey, an eBook reader by the French company Bookeen
- Odyssey case management software for law courts from Tyler Technologies

== Vehicles ==
=== Land ===
- Honda Odyssey, one of several types of a vehicle
  - Honda Odyssey (international), a minivan sold in Japan and other parts of the world
  - Honda Odyssey (North America), a minivan sold primarily in the US and Canada
  - Honda Odyssey (ATV), an all-terrain vehicle

=== Sea ===
- Odyssey (launch platform), a self-propelled semi-submersible mobile spacecraft launch platform converted from a mobile drilling rig
- Odyssey (tanker), an oil tanker responsible for an oil spill off the coast of Nova Scotia
- Villa Vie Odyssey, a cruise ship

=== Space ===
- Command Module for the Apollo 13 space mission (callsign "Odyssey")
- 2001 Mars Odyssey, an American spacecraft orbiting the planet Mars
- Neptune Odyssey, a mission concept for an orbiter to Neptune

== See also ==
- Odysseus (disambiguation)
- Ulysses (disambiguation)
- Odyssey III (disambiguation)
- Odyssey II (disambiguation)
- Odyssey I (disambiguation)
- Adventure (disambiguation)
- Voyage (disambiguation)
- Journey (disambiguation)
- Exploration
- Odissi
