= L'Odissea =

L'Odissea may refer to:

- The Odyssey (1968 miniseries), or L'Odissea, a European TV miniseries
- L'Odissea (1911 film), an Italian silent film

== See also ==
- The Odyssey (disambiguation)
