= Odyssey II =

Odyssey II, Odyssey 2, Odyssey Two, may refer to:

- Odyssey 2 (game console), a videogame console from Magnavox and Philips
- 2010: Odyssey Two (novel), a 1982 science fiction novel by Arthur C. Clarke
- Odyssey II (fictional TV spacecraft), a fictional spaceship from the 2020 U.S. TV show The Astronauts (TV series)
- Odyssey II (TV channel), former name of MEGA Cosmos (Canada)
- "The Odyssey II" (TV episode), a 1962 season 8 episode of Lassie; see List of Lassie (1954 TV series) episodes
- Odyssey II: The Return of Odysseus (film), a 1965 film from Encyclopædia Britannica Films; see List of Encyclopædia Britannica Films titles

== See also ==
- The second epic poem of the Epic Cycle/Trojan Cycle of the Illiad and the Odyssey of Ancient Greece
- 2010: The Year We Make Contact (film), a 1984 film based on the 1982 novel 2010: Odyssey Two
- A Second Odyssey (poem), an 1894 poem by Constantine P. Cavafy; a prior version of Ithaca (poem)
- Odyssey (disambiguation)
- Odyssey I (disambiguation)
- Odyssey II (disambiguation)
- Odyssey III (disambiguation)
