= Arkadiki Radiofonia Tileorasi =

Greek local TV station

- Headquarters: Erithrou Staurou 17-19, Tripoli, Greece

Ownership
- Owner: Arcadia Television S.A.

History
- Founded: 22 November 1991
- Launched: 11 June 1988

Links
- Website: Official website

Availability

Terrestrial
- Digea: 28 UHF (Ano Doliana, Asea, Levidi); 36 UHF (Aroi, Kalavryta, Thermo); 37 UHF (Kranidi, Nafplio, Troezen); 41 UHF (Ainos, Fyteies, Ithaca, Koryfi, Zacharo); 42 UHF (Parnon, Anavryti, Kythira); 44 UHF (Petalidi, Aetos, Gargalianoi); 46 UHF (Xylokastro, Desfina, Geraneia, Lidoriki, Nemea)

Arkadiki Radiofonia Tileorasi (abbreviated ART, Arcadia Radio Television) is a Greek local radio and television station serving Arcadia. Its headquarters are in Tripoli, the major city and capital. It broadcasts in Peloponnese, southern Central Greece, Aetolia, Kythira, Phocis, in Corinthian gulf, in islands of Argosaronic, in southern Ionian islands, Boeotia and in western Attica.

== Headquarters ==
Arcadia Television S.A., the company operating the station, was established on November 22, 1991. Its first headquarters are located at Mainalioti 7. On March 23, 1998, the channel's operation was legalized under the 6647/Ε license, by the Ministry for the Press. The following year moved its headquarters to Iroon Polytechniou 38 while at the same time its statute was modified by removing minor activities. At the end of 2001 moved its headquarters to Erithrou Staurou 17-19 where it remains until today. The station's current president is Syriza member Giorgos Papaileiou.

== See also ==
- List of Greek-language television channels
