= Croydon Cinemas =

Coordinates: 37.7958°S 145.2823°E

- Interactive map of Croydon Cinemas
- Address: 3 Hewish Road, Croydon, Victoria; Australia
- Owner: Gershov Family (1976)
- Capacity: 615 (1977-94); 732 (1994 Onwards)
- Screen: 4

Construction
- Opened: 26th December 1977
- Renovated: 2005 & 2013
- Expanded: 1994
- Closed: 29th March 2023
- Cost: About $1 million
- Architects: Print Plan & Drafting P/L (1976)
- Structural engineer: Richard Eckhaus (1976)
- Services engineers: Ed, Williams & Assoc. (1976)

Website
- https://web.archive.org/web/20230701000000*/www.croydoncinemas.com.au

Croydon Cinemas is a closed, quad-screen picture theatre complex located above the Hewmart Shopping Arcade at Hewish Road in Croydon, Victoria, Australia. It opened on 26 December 1977 and closed indefinitely on 29 March 2023 after 45 consecutive years of operation by numerous different companies.

== History ==
The site was acquired in June 1974 by the Gershov Family, who intended to develop a $1m twin-screen cinema, and a shopping arcade with 13 tenancies. Architectural drawings were prepared by the Footscray-based firm Plan Printing & Drafting in September 1976 and submitted for council approval the following month. Engineers Ed Williams & Associates were subcontracted to design the electrical services and Richard Eckhaus were the consulting engineers. Records show that equipment distributor Filmways supplied twin Simplex 35mm colour film projectors and a Christie "Autowind" 3-platter system. Cinema 1 had 358 seats and Cinema 2 had 257.

Independent cinema chain Dendy Cinemas was secured as the operator, and although that aligned with the company's expansion into the outer-eastern suburbs of Melbourne, it had significant problems finding licensed projectionists who lived locally. In an urgent letter to the Public Health Commission, company directors claimed Dendy had "exhausted every avenue in endeavouring to obtain a licensed projectionist for the theatre including advertising and even to the extent of having the union advertise in their newsletter without any result." A licensed projectionist and a trainee projectionist were eventually obtained, and the opening was held on Boxing Day 1977.

But the Dendy tenancy was not to last, and Village Cinema took over the site no more than a year after opening. Village had also taken over the nearby Knox Twin Cinema from Dendy around that time. Although designed by different firms, the Croydon Twin and Knox Twin cinemas had a similar appearance and layout, both with distinctive red and blue fire-resistant acoustic fabric supplied by A. J. Tully & Co.

Village remained as the tenant of Croydon Cinemas for about ten years until Hoyts took over the operation in the late 1980s. A 1994 refurbishment saw the addition of two cinemas, which considerably boosted attendance. Further refurbishments and equipments upgrades were completed in 2005. Hoyts ended its lease in November 2011 and the cinema sat empty until January 2012, when it reopened under independent operation as Plaza Cinemas. In June 2013, all four cinemas were modernised with digital projection and sound systems. Several upgrades were made including the addition of a small liquor bar, and a redesign of the ticket counter and concession stand.

The COVID-19 pandemic and subsequent restrictions created significant problems for the cinema industry, and compelled the owners to acquire the airspace above, with plans to add an additional to six or seven tenancies, as well as an outdoor cinema with views to the Dandenong Ranges. In 2022, the owners acquired the shop next to the cinema entrance, with the aim of creating a more welcoming and spacious entrance to the cinema complex. But that never eventuated and the cinema was controversially closed on 29 March 2023.

The future of the complex remains unclear and it currently listed for sale (as at March 2025) through real estate agents Appleby. A petition to re-open the historic and culturally significant site garnered hundreds of signatures from locals.
