= MTV Music (Greek TV channel) =

MTV Music Greece
- Country: Greece
- Broadcast area: Greece
- Headquarters: Marousi, Athens, Greece

Programming
- Language: Greek
- Picture format: 16:9 576i SDTV

Ownership
- Owner: Viacom International Media Networks Europe
- Sister channels: MTV Greece; Nickelodeon; Nick Jr. Nickelodeon Plus

History
- Launched: 7 October 2009
- Closed: 11 January 2016

MTV Music was a Greek pay television music channel that aired non-stop music videos, live performances and artist interviews and it was available only on OTE TV.

== See also ==
- Viacom International Media Networks Europe
- Music of Greece
