= GBCS =

GBCS may refer to:

- General Board of Church and Society, an agency of the United Methodist Church
- Great British Class Survey, a 2013 UK survey
- Greater Brunswick Charter School, a school in New Jersey
- Grand Blanc Community Schools, a school district in Michigan

== See also ==
- GBC (disambiguation)
