= Patra TV =

- Country: Greece
- Headquarters: 28th October 1, Pyrgos, Elis; Patras-Athens New National Road n.57, Patras, Achaea, Greece

Programming
- Language: Greek

Ownership
- Owner: Cosmos Pelop Media S.A.
- Sister channels: Nickelodeon Greece; Smile TV

History
- Founded: 26 April 1999
- Launched: 1989 (initial station); 17 November 2022 (second station)
- Replaced: PLP
- Closed: December 2012 (initial station); 7 April 2025 (second station)

Availability

Terrestrial
- Digea: 28 UHF (Ano Doliana, Asea, Levidi); 36 UHF (Aroi, Kalavryta, Thermo); 37 UHF (Kranidi, Nafplio, Troezen); 41 UHF (Ainos, Fyteies, Ithaca, Koryfi, Zacharo); 42 UHF (Parnon, Anavryti, Kythira); 44 UHF (Petalidi, Aetos, Gargalianoi); 46 UHF (Xylokastro, Desfina, Geraneia, Lidoriki, Nemea)

Patra TV was a regional television station in the city of Patras, Greece.

== History ==
The channel during its first period of operation had a long history, not to mention a history of strikes. In 2001, with the change of ownership status, its technical equipment is completely changed. In 2006 the station started its first major problems with the consequent closure. Its unpaid employees occupied the station, broadcasting screens with their demands, but the ownership threw black on his signal from the mountains. A few 24 hours later, the channel reopened with a full program.

In 2008, the previous ownership again tended to close the station, but only for a month, as it changed ownership again and reopened.

On 2011 for the umpteenth time and several months unpaid employees re-occupied the station until October of that year when reopens fully but with less staff.

On February 3, 2012, it became the first channel in Patras to begin its digital broadcast, while in December of the same year, the remaining employees occupied it for the last time due to debts, until it stopped broadcasting, with the NCRTV removing it from its registers in October 2013.

On November 17, 2022, Patra TV relaunched replacing PLP (ex. Cosmos TV Ilia). However, the second Patra TV also stopped broadcasting in April 7, 2025, with the NCRTV removing the station from its registers in December of the same year.

== Ownership ==
The station had several owners, many of whom were leading to its closure. The company that managed and operated it was called Television of Patras S.A. (Τηλεόραση της Πάτρας Α.Ε.) which was established on April 26, 1999. On March 20, 1998, the channel's operation was legalized under the 6316/Ε license, by the Ministry for the Press. Its first headquarters are located on Georgiou Tertseti 21. The first owners were the Anemodouras and Konstantinopoulos families. On 2000, moved its headquarters on the Patras-Athens new national road, number 73 where it remained until its closure.

At the end of 2001, it passed into the hands of shipowner Adamantios Polemis, investing 4.5 million euros in infrastructure and human resources, a record for a Greek local television station. One of the founders remained in the new ownership as an advisor until 2005.

In 2008, during the period when the channel was closed, it changed ownership and passed into the hands of the publisher of the newspaper Gnomi tis Patras where he remained until the closure of the channel at the end of 2012.

The second Patra TV in the period 2022-2025 belonged to Cosmos Pelop Media S.A., which was founded in 1997 with the operation of the predecessor channel Cosmos in the prefecture of Elis and was legalized on March 23, 1998, with license 6564/E, by the Ministry for the Press.

== Logo and slogan ==
Its logo was only written in the Greek alphabet. Later, the logo was changed and is in the Latin alphabet.

== See also ==
- List of Greek-language television channels
- List of companies of Greece
