= GBC =

GBC may refer to:

== Broadcasting ==
- Gibraltar Broadcasting Corporation
- Ghana Broadcasting Corporation
- Granite Broadcasting, in the United States
- Greek Business Channel, in Greece
- Guyana Broadcasting Corporation

== Education ==
- George Brown College, in Toronto, Ontario, Canada
- Goldey–Beacom College, in Wilmington, Delaware, United States
- Government Barisal College, in Bangladesh
- Great Basin College, in Elko, Nevada, United States

== Religion ==
- Garo Baptist Convention, in India and Bangladesh
- Georgia Baptist Convention, in the American state of Georgia
- Germantown Baptist Church, in Tennessee, United States
- Grand Black Chapter, Protestant fraternal organization originating in County Armagh, Northern Ireland

== Other uses ==
- Gambler's Book Shop / GBC Press, an American bookstore and publisher
- Game Boy Color, a handheld game console
- Game Boy Camera, a 1998 accessory for the Game Boy
- GBC Asset Management, a Canadian investment management firm
- Gender Balance Council, a federal entity in the United Arab Emirates
- General Binding Corporation, an American office supplies manufacturer
- Get Busy Committee, an American rap group
- Gipuzkoa Basket Club, a Spanish professional basketball club
- Girls Band Cry, a 2024 Japanese anime television series
- Global Business Coalition
- GothBoiClique, an American emo rap collective
- Greater Baltimore Committee, an American urban planning organization
- Great Ball Contraption, a type of contraption built with Lego parts
- Green Building Council, a type of environmental organization
