= PLP (TV channel) =

- Country: Greece
- Headquarters: 28th October 1, Pyrgos, Elis, Greece

Programming
- Language: Greek

Ownership
- Owner: Cosmos Pelop Media S.A.

History
- Founded: 18 February 1997
- Launched: 4 September 2015
- Replaced: Cosmos TV (1997-2015)
- Closed: 17 November 2022 (Regional free-to-air)
- Replaced by: Patra TV

Links
- Website: Official website

Availability

Terrestrial
- Digea: 30 UHF (Ano Doliana, Asea, Levidi); 37 UHF (Aroi, Kalavryta, Thermo); 38 UHF (Kranidi, Nafplio, Troezen); 43 UHF (Parnon, Anavryti, Kythira); 45 UHF (Ainos, Fyteies, Ithaca, Koryfi, Zacharo); 47 UHF (Xylokastro, Desfina, Geraneia, Lidoriki, Nemea); 48 UHF (Petalidi, Aetos, Gargalianoi)

Streaming media
- Live Streaming: Hellas Net TV

PLP was a regional television station operating since September 4, 2015 as a continuation of Cosmos Ilia broadcasting in Elis and southwestern Greece. Its headquarters were in Pyrgos. It broadcast movies, music video clips and programs, including local Greek but also from the United States, Australia and the United Kingdom.

On 17 November 2022 PLP was replaced by the new Patra TV which operated from 1989 until the end of 2012 when it closed due to financial problems. However, PLP continues to broadcast online through the website of its partner since 2015, television network HellasNet.

== Ownership ==
The company operating the station was established on February 18, 1997, and was originally named Cosmos Telecommunication, Cinematographic, Advertising, Television and Editorial S.A. Its first headquarters are located in Amaliada at Kalavryton 9. On March 23, 1998, the channel's operation was legalized under the 6564/Ε license, by the Ministry for the Press. The following year moved its headquarters to Kourogiannopoulou 19 in the same city. On 2000, its statute was modified by changing the activities and the company name to Cosmos Broadcasting, Telecommunication and Editorial S.A. while at the same time moved its headquarters to Pyrgos where it remains until today.

In 2016, the activities and name of the company changed to the current Cosmos Pelop Media S.A., which until its closure in 2025 operated the channel under the last name Patra TV.

== Logo ==
Its former logo would have the channel name with a black circle indicating space.

== See also ==
- List of Greek-language television channels
- List of companies of Greece
