= Liana K =

Liana K may refer to:

== People ==
- Liana Kanelli, Greek actress, TV and radio host, journalist and politician
- Liana Kerzner, Canadian YouTuber
- Liana K. Ramirez, actress and dancer
