= Mad World (disambiguation) =

"Mad World" is a 1982 song by Tears for Fears, covered by Michael Andrews and Gary Jules (2001) and others.

Mad World may also refer to:

- Mad World (film), a 2016 Hong Kong drama film directed by Wong Chun
- Mad World, a 2018 science fiction film directed by Paul Tanter
- MAD World, the international network of MAD TV
- MadWorld, a 2009 video game
- "Mad World" (Hardwell song), 2015
- "Mad World", a song by Dennis Lloyd, 2025
- "Mad World", a song by Krokus from Rock the Block
- "Mad World", a song by Within Temptation from Resist
- "Mad World", a song by Demi Lovato from Dancing with the Devil... the Art of Starting Over
- Mad World: Evelyn Waugh and the Secrets of Brideshead, a 2010 book by Paula Byrne
- "Madworld", a fictional location in the 1979 Star Trek novel Trek to Madworld
- "Mad World" (Holby City), a television episode

== See also ==
- A Mad World, My Masters, a 1605 play by Thomas Middleton
- It's a Mad, Mad, Mad, Mad World, a 1963 American comedy film
- It's a Mad, Mad, Mad World, a 1987 Hong Kong comedy film and film series
- Mad Mad World, a 1991 album by Tom Cochrane
- Mad Mad World (TV series), an ITV panel show
- Mad, Mad World Tour, a 2012 concert tour by Meat Loaf
- Mad at the World, a Christian rock band
