= Anavryti =

Anavryti (Greek: Αναβρυτή) may refer to several places in Greece:

- Anavryti, Aetolia-Acarnania, a village in the Apodotia municipality, Aetolia-Acarnania
- Anavryti, Laconia, a village in the Mystras municipality, Laconia
