= Odyssey I =

Odyssey I, Odyssey 1, or Odyssey One. may refer to:

- Odyssey One, a 21st-century book series by Evan Currie
- 2001: A Space Odyssey (novel), a 1968 novel by Arthur C. Clarke, the first novel in the Space Odyssey novel series, also referred to as "2001: Odyssey One" or "Odyssey One", along the conventions of the second and third novels.
- Magnavox Odyssey, the first video game console in the Odyssey videog ame console family, also referred to as "Odyssey 1" or "Odyssey I"
- Odyssey 1, a Canadian Greek TV channel, also referred to as "Odyssey I"
- "The Odyssey I", a 1962 season 8 episode of Lassie; see List of Lassie (1954 TV series) episodes
- Odyssey: Structure of the Epic, also referred to as "Odyssey I", part of the Odyssey film series; a 1966 film by Encyclopædia Britannica Films; see List of Encyclopædia Britannica Films titles

== See also ==
- the first epic poem in the Ancient Greek epic Illiad and Odyssey story series, the Epic Cycle or Trojan Cycle, of which only 2 remain extant, the Illiad, and, the Odyssey
- 2001: A Space Odyssey (film), a 1968 film directed by Stanley Kubrick, the first film in the Space Odyssey film series
- Odyssey III (disambiguation)
- Odyssey II (disambiguation)
- Odyssey (disambiguation)
