= Odyssey III (disambiguation) =

Odyssey III is a 1973 sculpture by Tony Rosenthal in San Diego.

Odyssey III, Odyssey 3, or Odyssey Three, may also refer to:

- 2061: Odyssey Three, a 1987 novel by Arthur C. Clarke, third novel in the Space Odyssey novel series
- Odyssey III: The Central Themes, part of the Odyssey film series; a 1965 film by Encyclopædia Britannica Films; see List of Encyclopædia Britannica Films titles
- Odyssey 3, a video game console from Magnavox and Philips, part of the Odyssey console series
- Odyssey 3, a 1975 opera by Alice Shields
- "Odyssey #3", a song by Powderfinger off the 2001 record The Metre/Waiting for the Sun
- "The Odyssey III", a 1962 season 8 episode of Lassie; see List of Lassie (1954 TV series) episodes

== See also ==
- the third epic poem in the Ancient Greek epic Illiad and Odyssey story series, the Epic Cycle or Trojan Cycle, of which only 2 remain extant, the Illiad, and, the Odyssey
- Odyssey II (disambiguation)
- Odyssey I (disambiguation)
- Odyssey (disambiguation)
