= CHTO =

Multicultural radio station in Toronto

Coordinates: 43.6776°N 79.35075°W

- Toronto, Ontario; Canada
- Broadcast area: Greater Toronto
- Frequency: 1690 kHz
- Branding: CHTO AM 1690

Programming
- Format: Greek language talk and music

Ownership
- Owner: Canadian Hellenic Toronto Radio Inc.

History
- First air date: September 2007
- Call sign meaning: Canadian Hellenic Toronto Ontario

Technical information
- Class: C
- Power: 6,000 watts day; 1,000 watts night
- Repeaters: Mississauga: CHTO-1 (1490 kHz, 23 watts day, 770 watts night)

Links
- Webcast: Listen Live
- Website: www.am1690.ca

CHTO (1690 kHz) is a commercial AM radio station in Toronto, Ontario, Canada. The station airs an ethnic radio format. It is owned by Canadian Hellenic Toronto Radio Inc., which is run by John Maniatakos and son of Peter Maniatakos who owns the Odyssey Television Network. CHTO's programming is predominantly Greek, although it is mandated to air programming in other languages as well. CHTO's radio studios are on Danforth Avenue in the Riverdale neighbourhood.

CHTO transmits 6,000 watts daytime & 1,000 watts nighttime. It uses a non-directional antenna. The transmitter is on Waterman Avenue at Hollinger Road in the O'Connor-Parkview neighbourhood near the Don River. It also is heard on a repeater station, CHTO-1 on 1490 kHz in Mississauga.

== History ==
CHCR logo

Mrs. Maniatakos operated a closed circuit specialty audio service in Toronto since 1966 under the name CHCR-FM. This service aired Greek language programming 24 hours a day. It was initially available as an SCMO service (via CKFM-FM) but subsequently switched to cable and was available on Rogers Digital Cable channel 959, as part of their digital radio offerings, in Toronto and area.

In 2007 when CHTO launched, CHCR-FM was discontinued and CHTO now airs in its place on Rogers Cable.

The station was initially going to launch by the end of 2006, but this was pushed back due to technical problems. It has been on the air since September 2007; 18 years ago.

On June 10, 2009, CHTO applied to the Canadian Radio-television and Telecommunications Commission (CRTC) to increase the daytime transmitting power to 3,000 watts, in an effort to serve communities in Mississauga and Brampton. The request received approval on November 5, 2009. CHTO began broadcasting at its new power as of March 2010.

On December 4, 2012, the CRTC approved a change in ownership of the station to John Maniatakos due to the 2009 death of his mother, original owner Mrs. Maniatakos.

== CHTO-1 ==
On October 14, 2015, Canadian Hellenic Toronto Radio Inc. submitted an application to add an AM transmitter at Mississauga. The new transmitter operates on 1490 kHz with a daytime power of 23 watts and a night time power of 770 watts. The call sign for the rebroadcaster is CHTO-1. This application was approved on September 1, 2016.
