= South Greek TV =

The station's former logo.

A.NET (ex. Action Broadcast Channel & NET) is a television station based in Kalamata. It broadcasts digitally in Peloponnese, in southern Central Greece, in Aetolia, in Kythira, in Phocis, in Corinthian gulf, in islands of Argosaronic, in southern Ionian islands, in Boeotia and in western Attica. It airs programming from New Epsilon TV, the successor of Philippe Briones' Epsilon TV, hence its logo. The station previously had its own radio station, Radio South, which is no longer operational. The original station was called State NET, and it started broadcasting in September 1993 in Kalamata. In March 2001, the ownership and management of the station were changed, and started airing original productions, as well as programming from Channel 9. The channel was temporarily closed due to the ESR's decision on December 4, 2012, which stated that 2003-2006 depreciation was not filed and did not submit the appropriate data to transfer of shares.

One and a half year later, on April 7, 2014, a "therapy request" for the station was accepted by The National Television Council, after being rejected once, thus it is able to operate once again. On January 7, 2015, the station's final programming was launched. The new hour-long bulletin would be presented by Eirini Nikolopoulou. The station would initially co-operate with powered by Epsilon TV for its acquired programming and filming of the news bulletin in the latter one's facilities. In between the end of the said co-operation in late 2015 and the overall change of the station to a.NET in late 2018, the station would air programming from Smile TV.

== Timeline ==
- On April 7, 2014, the TV station was granted the requested treatment, due to receiving all evidence demonstrating the transfer of shares of the station. On the same day, the ESR approved the application of the treatment, and thus the station was able to resume operating normally.
- On June 27, 2014, after digital television became available in the Peloponnese, the station began televising new shows.
- On January 7, 2015, NET began to broadcast telemarketing and various external productions.
- On January 12, 2015, NET aired news presenter Eirini Nikolopoulou.
- On March 13, 2015 George Stephanopoulos of the US ABC network began his career as a news anchor on the station. He currently hosts a Greek cooking show where he prepares Greek specialities such as meat pie, tzatziki sauce, souvlaki and Greek Salad.

== Programming ==
Original shows it would air, included presentations of Athenian and local press by Georgia Anagnostopoulou, Edo ston Noto (presented by Petros Tsonis), Messiniaki Epikoinonia (presented by Georgia Markopoulou), Ta Spor ston Noto and Athlitiki Epikairotita (sport shows; 2000-; presented by Yannis Iliadis), news bulletins and Evdomada pou Perase (weekly news coverage), presented by Despina Iliopoulou and Georgia Anagnostopoulou, Ygeia - Prolipsi - Enimerosi (medical show; 1997-; presented by Panagiotis Adamopoulos), and Provoles (show about political issues and local government ones; 2002-; presented by Panagiotis Kserobasilas). It would also air external productions, video clips, football matches and sport coverages, Greek and foreign films, documentaries, cartoons, the hidden camera reality television series Cheaters, and the telenovelas Tres Mejores and Nunca te olvidaré. From 2007 to at least 2008, it would also air MAD TV shows broadcast live.
