= Antenna Satellite =

ANT1 Satellite
- Country: Greece
- Broadcast area: Australia

Programming
- Language: Greek
- Picture format: 16:9

Ownership
- Owner: Antenna Group

History
- Launched: 1993

Links
- Website: antennapacific.gr

Antenna Satellite (stylized ANT1 Satellite) is a Greek-based subscription television channel established in 1993. The channel is owned by Antenna Group and airs programming from ANT1 in the United States and Canada. It also has the rights to Greek soccer and basketball leagues.

Its programming is seen in Canada on Odyssey.

== History ==
The channel opened in 1993, initially carried for four hours a day on transponder 9 of the Galaxy 3 satellite, timesharing with Satellite Market USA. Its founder was Theo Kyriakou (son of ANT1 founder Minos Kyriakou), who was training at CBS in Washington at the time; he joined Antenna Group as its CEO in 1998 at his father's initiative. The channel also produced a news bulletin, Antenna Satellite News, to air both in the United States and in Greece on the main ANT1 network, where it aired in the early mornings on the latter after the CBS Evening News. As of 1998, it was available on Dish Network nationwide; James Grau was its general manager in New York, he was responsible for packaging ANT1's programming to the United States and was in charge of its distribution to pay-TV companies; while also handling distribution of Arabic content in selected markets.

In December 2008, the channel launched on RCN, and in April 2009 on Bright House Networks. Its existing agreement with Dish Network was renewed in late March 2011; this envisioned the creation of a second channel, ANT1 Prime, carrying programs from ANT1's library, Greek movies, music and soccer matches.
