= MTV (Greece) =

MTV Greece
- Final logo used from 1 July 2011 to 11 January 2016
- Country: Greece
- Broadcast area: Greece; Cyprus
- Network: MTV
- Headquarters: Marousi, Athens, Greece

Programming
- Languages: Greek; English
- Picture format: 1080i HDTV (downscaled to 16:9 576i for the SDTV feed)

Ownership
- Owner: Radio TV Piraeus S.A. (d.t. MTV Greece S.A.)
- Sister channels: Nickelodeon; Nick Jr. Nickelodeon Plus

History
- Launched: 1 September 2008; 18 years ago
- Replaced: Smart TV
- Closed: 11 January 2016; 10 years ago
- Replaced by: RISE (terrestrial television); MTV Europe and MTV Live (pay television)

Availability

Terrestrial
- Digea: Channel 50 - 54

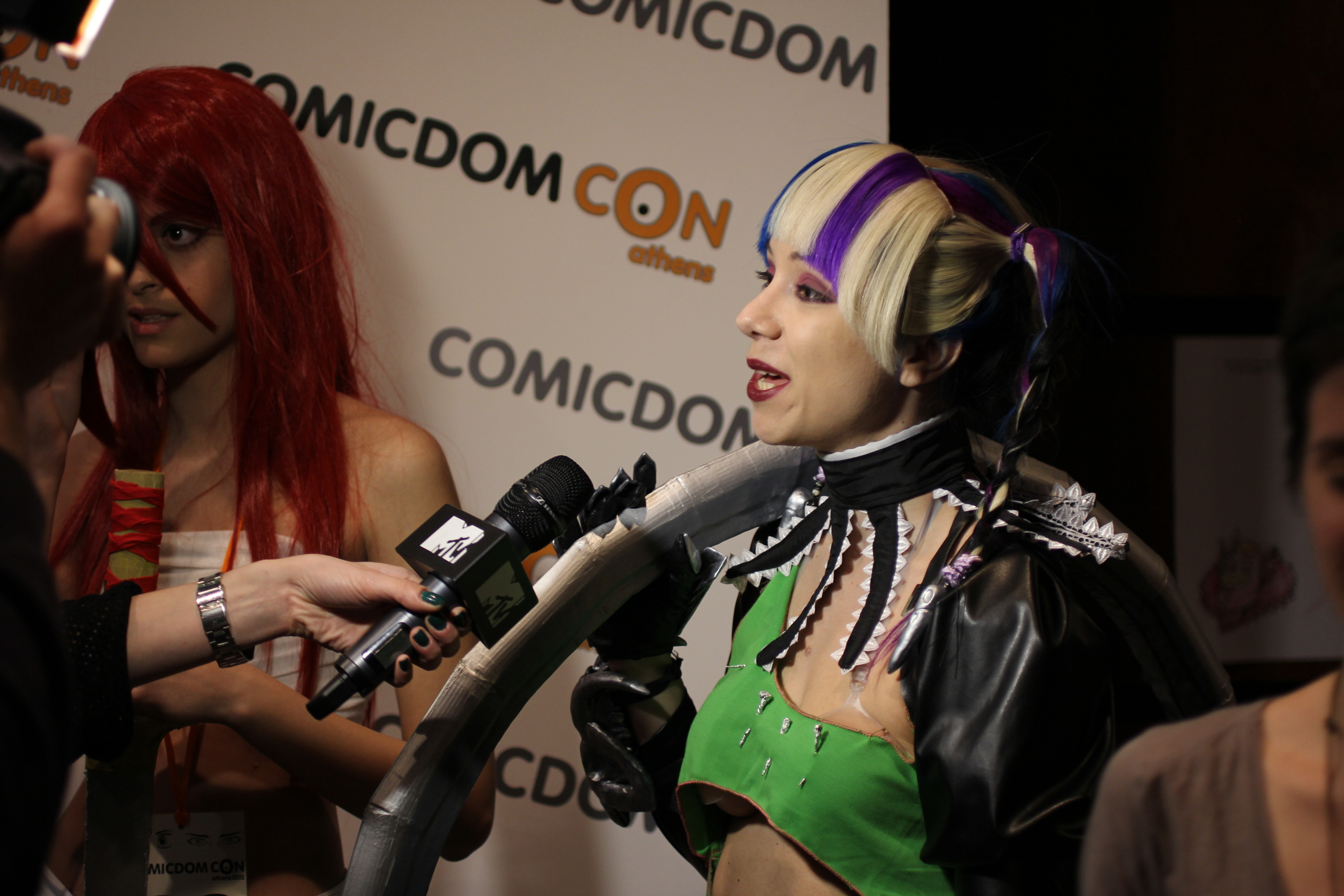
Greek MTV journalists interviewing a cosplayer at the Comicdom 2012 comics convention in Athens, Greece

MTV Greece was a Greek free-to-air regional television channel launched on 1 September 2008, replacing Smart TV. Owned by Radio TV Piraeus S.A., it closed down suddenly on 11 January 2016, one year before the proper MTV copyrights come to an end, despite good ratings. It was replaced by RISE on terrestrial television. Also, on the OTE TV and Nova subscription providers, it was replaced by European television channel MTV Europe (today MTV Global) and MTV Live (until the closing date of 31 December 2025, with a new policy by Skydance).

MTV Greece used to air mainly British, American and Greek music, MTV original shows like Date My Mom, Made, Nitro Circus, Room Raiders, America's Most Smartest Model, etc. subtitled in Greek, as well as three Greek shows (Hitlist Hellas, MTV Pulse, MTV Take 20). It was available on terrestrial television in Athens and via satellite to the rest of the country with its signal reach up to Cyprus. MTV also launched MTV Plus, a regional spin-off channel based in Thessaloniki.

MTV Greece's launch event took place in Panathenaic Stadium on 5 October 2008 with live performances from R.E.M., Kaiser Chiefs, Gabriella Cilmi, and C Real. The concert was also broadcast live in Italy, France, Portugal and Spain on MTV. On 9 October 2009 MTV organized the first MTV Day, a celebration for the 1 year of airing in Greece.

MTV held a concert at the O.A.C.A. Olympic Indoor Hall, in Athens, with quests Myronas Stratis, Professional Sinnerz, Moral, Aloha From Hell and Tokyo Hotel. The concert was recorded and was later shown on the MTV World Stage.

A high-definition feed of the channel was launched on 17 October 2011.

Closed on 11 January 2016 and replaced by Rise.

== Programming ==
The channel combined local and international music, and aired international MTV shows (with Greek subtitles) including Jackass, Pimp My Ride, When I Was 17, If You Really Knew Me, My Super Sweet 16, Viva La Bam, Life of Ryan, 16 and Pregnant, as well as some original content produced exclusively for Greece.

=== Local shows ===
- Clip of the Week
- Every Day Girls! – Weekly show focuses on girls, fashion, horoscopes, entertainment and celebrity news and interviews.
- Game On – Weekly show focuses on video games.
- Headbangers Ball – Heavy metal music videos and news.
- Mission Lydia – Entertainment program hosted by Lydia Papaioannou.
- MTV City Life
- MTV Coolwave Challenges
- MTV Greeklips
- MTV New Generation
- MTV News – Music and entertainment news updates.
- MTV Summer Clash
- MTV Show Us Your Style
- MTV Take 20 – Weekly show focuses on movie news, trailers, interviews and a look at the latest new releases.
- myMTV
- Only Hits
- Party Zone
- Wake Up with MTV
- Yo! MTV Raps
- Your Noise Daily
- Your Noise Live – Daily variety program with music, news, games and interviews.

== Presenters and VJs ==
- Nafsika Lalioti
- Katerina Tsavalou
- Lydia Papaioannou
- Konstantinos Koutsoumpas
- Vanessa Christodoulou
- Orfeas Spiliotopoulos
- Thomas Protopapas
- Vasiliki Arvanitaki
- Estel Ameti
- Marianthi Mpairaktari
- Myrto Kazi
- Giorgos Satsidis
- Spiros Margaritis

== Spinoff channels ==
=== MTV Plus ===
Launched on 18 October 2009, MTV Plus was a regional channel available in Thessaloniki. Its programming was similar to its sister channel MTV Greece. On 13 December 2011 it was replaced by Nickelodeon Plus.

=== MTV Music ===
Launched on 7 October 2009, MTV Music was a 24-hour music channel playing non-stop music videos, live performances and artist interviews. It closed on 2011 and was replaced by MTV Greece and, from 17 October 2011, MTV HD.

== MTV HD ==
MTV HD was launched on 17 October 2011 on OTE TV.

== Closure ==
MTV was closed from Greece territories on 11 January 2016 and replaced by Rise.

== See also ==
- Paramount Networks EMEAA
- Music of Greece
