= Keedoo =

Greek children's TV channel

- Country: Greece
- Broadcast area: Greece

Programming
- Language: Greek
- Picture format: 1080i HDTV

Ownership
- Owner: Tilekinisi (Local TV) S.M.S.A.

History
- Launched: January 1, 2026; 3 months ago
- Replaced: Nickelodeon Greece

Links
- Website: https://keedoo.gr

Keedoo is a Greek free-to-air children's television channel that launched on 1 January 2026 as a de facto replacement for Nickelodeon Greece on terrestrial television.

Keedoo launched on 1 January 2026, replacing Nickelodeon Greece after Tilekinisi chose not to renew its brand license agreement with Paramount Skydance, which has been winding down most of its non-essential networks worldwide due to cost pressures from new ownership and the decline of pay television; Nickelodeon Plus was replaced on the same day by Keedoo Plus. It broadcasts free-to-air through the Digea network and can also be received via compatible satellite receivers.

== Programming ==
The network's schedule at launch featured eight non-Nickelodeon programmes that had already been a part of the network's previous schedule, along with other pan-European children's programmes.
