= ERT World (Canada) =

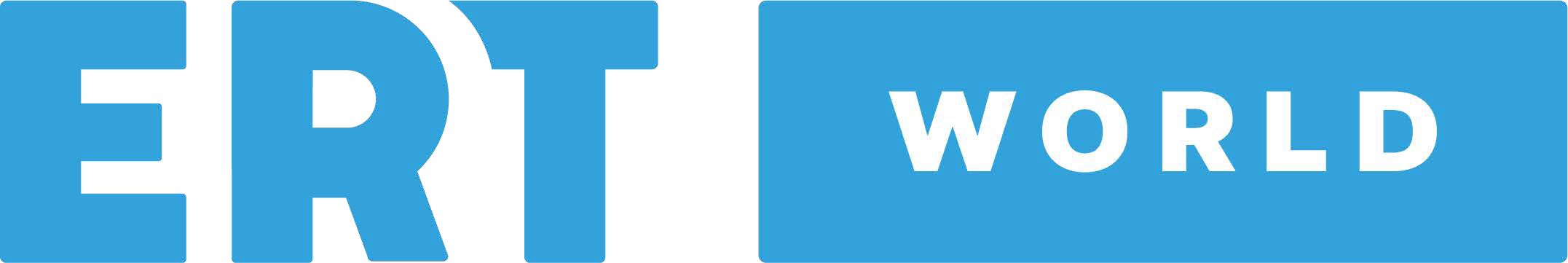
- Country: Canada
- Broadcast area: National
- Headquarters: Toronto, Ontario

Programming
- Picture format: 480i (SDTV)

Ownership
- Owner: Odyssey Television Network
- Sister channels: Odyssey; MEGA Cosmos

History
- Launched: 13 November 2001; 23 June 2016 (relaunch)
- Closed: 21 May 2011
- Former names: Odyssey II; ERT Sat

Links
- Website: ERT World Canada

ERT World is a Canadian exempt Category B Greek language specialty channel and is owned by Odyssey Television Network. It broadcasts programming from ERT World and local Canadian content produced by Odyssey TV. It launched in November 2001 on Rogers Cable.

Programming on ERT World Canada includes news, talk shows, documentaries, sports, cultural programs and more. ERT World is the international service of ERT, Greece's public broadcaster. ERT World is also unofficially referred to as OTN2.

== History ==
ERT World Canada was licensed by the CRTC on December 14, 2000, as Odyssey II.

Since its inception in 2001 up until 2003, Odyssey II (as it was then known) featured programming from Greece's top private network - MEGA Channel. In the summer of 2003, a dispute arose between Odyssey Television Network and the North American distributors of MEGA Channel and the programming was subsequently pulled. A short while later, OTN2 began airing programming from ERT World which subsequently led to the channel being renamed ERT World Canada.

In June 2013, ERT World was shut down in Greece by the Greek government due to a restructuring of the Hellenic Broadcasting Corporation. The government had announced that a new, smaller public broadcaster would launch in early 2014 and it would feature an international feed for Greeks abroad. Due to continued political instability in Greece and several changes in government, the public broadcasting service has gone through significant turmoil. Due to the loss of programming, ERT World Canada has been airing programming from Greek Cinema since the shut down of ERT World, on a temporary basis.

On July 30, 2013, Rogers Cable replaced ERT World Canada in their lineup with Alpha Sat, a private network from Greece.

On August 30, 2013, the CRTC approved Odyssey Television Network's request to convert ERT World Canada from a licensed Category B speciality service to an exempted Cat. B third language service.

On March 14, 2017, ERT World Canada resumed airing programming from ERT World in Greece, albeit on a part-time basis. The channel resumed airing ERT World programming on a full-time basis in April 2017.

== Notable shows ==
A list of notable shows that air on ERT World Canada, as of June 2025:

- H Paralia, drama
- Hlektra - drama
- Zaketa Na Pareis - comedy
- Kyriaki Sto Xorio - travel programme, airs Sundays
- Syntheseis - morning news show, airs Monday - Friday
- Basket League - LIVE Greek Basket League matches, airs Sundays
- Theia Leitourgia - Sunday Mass, airs Sundays
