= WXYB =

- Indian Rocks Beach, Florida; United States
- Broadcast area: Pinellas County, Florida
- Frequency: 1520 kHz

Programming
- Format: Brokered programming

Ownership
- Owner: Angelatos Broadcasting; (Asa Broadcasting, Inc.)
- Sister stations: WPSO; WZRA-CD

History
- First air date: May 11, 1963; 63 years ago
- Former call signs: WJBI (1961–1962); WGNP (1962–1973); WGNB (1973–1991)

Technical information
- Licensing authority: FCC
- Facility ID: 2918
- Class: D
- Power: 1,000 watts (day); 13 watts (night)
- Transmitter coordinates: 27°50′40.1″N 82°46′20.4″W

Links
- Public license information: Public file; LMS
- Website: www.wpso.com/wxyb.htm

WXYB (1520 kHz) is a commercial AM radio station licensed to Indian Rocks Beach, Florida, and serving the Tampa Bay area. The station is owned by Angelatos Broadcasting.

The station airs an ethnic radio format featuring shows in Greek, Spanish and other languages. It sells blocks of brokered time to hosts who then seek advertising support from their communities.

== AM facilities and FM translator ==
Because it shares AM 1520 with Class A clear channel radio stations WWKB in Buffalo, New York, and KOKC in Oklahoma City, this station previously was a daytimer. To avoid interfering with those 50,000-watt stations, it was required to sign off at sunset. On May 15, 2008, the Federal Communications Commission (FCC) fined WXYB $4,000 for operating during the nighttime hours. Further inspections found that while the station signed off, equipment failure has prevented WXYB from shutting down completely. It has since then been fixed and the FCC reduced the fines to $3,000 based on its history of compliance with the rules.

WXYB is now able to broadcast around the clock. It transmits 1,000 watts daytime, and 13 watts nighttime. WXYB uses a non-directional antenna at all times. The transmitter is off Cheyenne Drive North in Seminole, Florida.

WXYB was heard on 65-watt FM translator station 103.9 W280FD in Largo, Florida. The translator now rebroadcasts WQBN.

== Tower collapse ==
WXYB transmits from a tower located on Cheyenne Drive near 78th Avenue North in Seminole. WXYB had been transmitting from tower#1 used by WHBO. However, in 2006, the tower fell when the guy wires were clipped by construction equipment at a housing development that was built around the antennas. WXYB was forced to operate from the third tower of the former WFSO (now WTBN) array, under FCC Special Temporary Authority ("STA"). This tower was not used by WHBO, while the other two in the array were.

In August 2010, WXYB applied to use the "STA" tower as its permanent home, with a new nighttime authorization of 20 watts. The FCC granted the construction permit on October 14, 2011, and the license on October 9, 2015.
