= MAD Greekz =

- Country: Greece

Programming
- Picture format: 4:3 (576i, SDTV)

Ownership
- Owner: Solar Media S.A.
- Sister channels: MAD

History
- Launched: September 12, 2008

MAD Greekz is a 24-hour Greek cable music channel that launched on September 12, 2008. It is a spin-off channel of MAD TV. It is available exclusively on Nova and is commercial free.

== Programs ==
- Juke Box - music clips requested by viewers
- Take 5 - spotlight on a different artist each day, five songs in a row
- Love Mix - focus on ballads from pop to rock
- Time Machine - a retro show featuring songs from the '90s
- Late Show - live performances from various artists
- After Hours - music mix featuring the latest hits
- Greeklish - Greek artists' adaptation of foreign hits
- Big Ten - Ten songs in a row from a specific artist or theme
- First Table Pista - Top hits from artists currently part of the Athens night scene

== See also ==
- MAD
- MAD World
