= MTV Plus =

Defunct Greek television channel

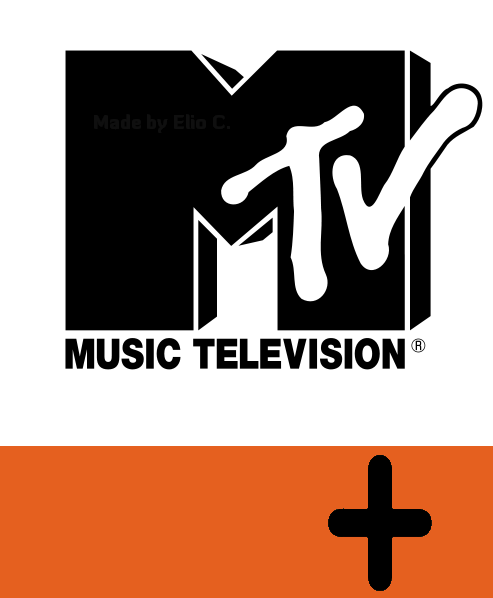
- Country: Greece
- Headquarters: Thessaloniki, Greece

Programming
- Languages: Greek; English
- Picture format: 4:3 (576i SDTV)

Ownership
- Owner: Pertho Radio TV Enterprises S.M.S.A.
- Sister channels: MTV Greece; Nick Jr. MTV Music; Nickelodeon

History
- Launched: 18 October 2009
- Replaced: Balkans TV (1995–2009)
- Closed: 12 December 2011
- Replaced by: Nickelodeon Plus

MTV Plus was a Greek free-to-air television channel in Thessaloniki.

== History ==
The channel was launched in Greece on 18 October 2009. Its inauguration party was held in "Vogue" Club in Thessaloniki on 17 December 2009, with the guest appearance of British dance band Freemasons and some Greek bands such as C Real and Stavento. MTV+ was available on DTT in Thessaloniki, northern Greece. Its programming was similar to its sister channel MTV Greece. MTV+ used MTV's then global branding. The channel was closed down on 12 December 2011, replaced by Nickelodeon Plus.
