= Acheloos TV =

- Country: Greece
- Headquarters: Griva 70, Agrinio, 30131

Programming
- Language: Greek

Ownership
- Owner: George Bokas and Co. S.A.

History
- Launched: February 22, 1992

Links
- Website: Axeloos Media Group

Availability

Terrestrial
- Digea: 33 UHF (Corfu, Delvinaki, Dodoni, Filiates, Igoumenitsa, Metsovo, Mitsikeli, Molossoi, Paramythia, Vasiliko, Zagori); 39 UHF (Acarnania, Amfilochia, Arta, Fanari, Lakka Souliou); 43 UHF (Ainos, Fyteies, Ithaca)

Acheloos Television (Greek: Αχελώος Τηλεόραση) is a Greek local radio and television station serving the central and western Aetolia-Acarnania. Its headquarters are in the city of Agrinio. It broadcasts in Epirus, western Central Greece and Ionian islands but its signal can be received also in western Evrytania, in the northwestern Peloponnese, in the northwestern Ilia and in west parts of Trikala and Karditsa. The station is named after the Acheloos river. It offers local programs and music from Greece, as well as English-language programs. As of December 19, 2014, Acheloos TV is available in Epirus and Corfu through various digital frequencies.

== Property ==
The channel is owned by George Bokas and Co. S.A. - Radio and Television Enterprises of Western Greece (Γεώργιος Μπόκας και Σία Ανώνυμη Εταιρεία - Ραδιοτηλεοπτικές Επιχειρήσεις Δυτικής Ελλάδας), which was established on June 10, 1994 as George Bokas and Co. S.A. for the Production and Marketing of Audio and Video Products (Γεώργιος Μπόκας και Σία Ανώνυμη Εταιρεία Παραγωγής και Εμπορίας Προϊόντων Ήχου και Εικόνας).

The station's founder, George Bokas, initially served as a member of the board of directors and in mid-1996, as one of the vice-presidents (the other was Giorgos Soltatos). In early 1998, the station's operation was legalized, based on a decision of the Ministry of Press, with protocol number 6401/Ε/20.3.1998.

In early 2000, the statutes of the organization were amended, expanding its activities while from the following year onwards, George Bokas assumed the position of chairman of the board of directors and CEO of the station.

At the end of 2003, the organization took its current name, while a partial share package was transferred, and almost four years later, the statutes were amended again, with an expansion of activities. The organization was temporarily in a period of dissolution-liquidation, due to the death of George Bokas on September 23, 2014. However, it continues to operate normally.

== Acheloos FM 98.4 ==
Acheloos FM started at the same time as the channel, broadcasting a full informational and entertainment program. The station operates with the 92/22.11.2005 legal certificate from the ESR and broadcasts on the frequency 98.4 FM. Since its inception, the station broadcast from the facilities of the former local association of municipalities and communities of the prefecture of Aitoloakarnania in the area of "Prophitis Ilias Agrinio", which belong to a private person. Since then, the station broadcasts in the area of "Agios Petros" on Mount Arakynthos.

== See also ==
- List of Greek-language television channels
- List of companies of Greece
