= Liana Kanelli =

Greek journalist and politician

- Λιάνα Κανέλλη
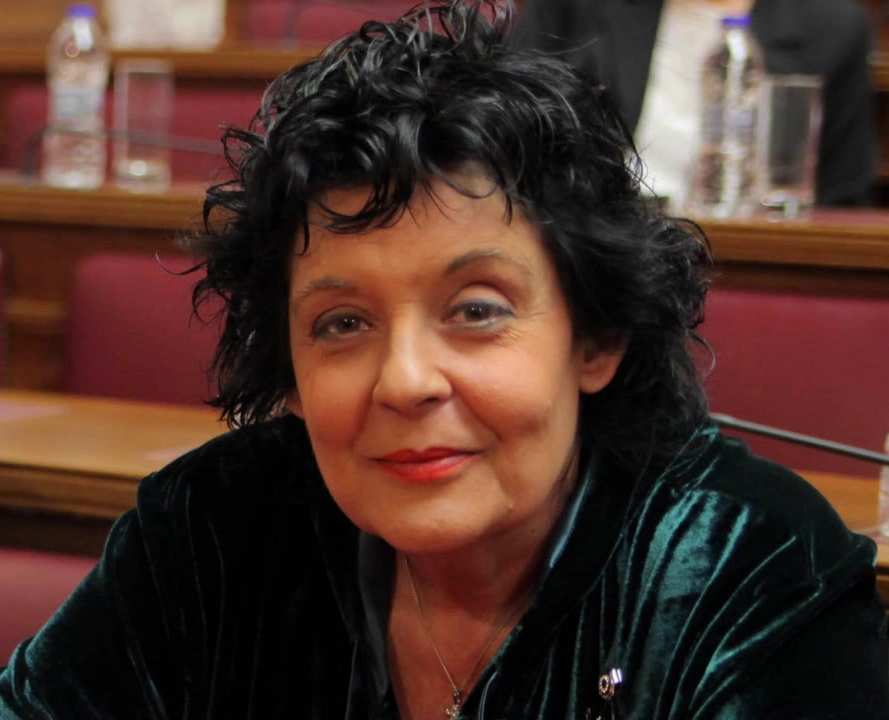
- Kanelli in 2014

Member of the Hellenic Parliament
- Incumbent
- Assumed office 9 April 2000
- Constituency: Athens A

Personal details
- Born: 20 March 1954 (age 72) Athens, Greece
- Party: Communist Party of Greece (1992–present); New Democracy (1974–1979)
- Children: 1
- Education: National and Kapodistrian University of Athens
- Occupation: Politician; Lawyer; Journalist

Garyfallia "Liana" Kanelli (Greek: Γαρυφαλλιά (Λιάνα) Κανέλλη; born 20 March 1954) is a Greek journalist and Member of the Greek Parliament for the Communist Party of Greece since 2000.

== Education ==
She graduated with a law degree from the University of Athens Law School.

Kanelli also learned to speak several foreign languages. Apart from Greek, Kanelli is also fluent in three foreign languages: English, French and Italian.

== Career ==
=== Journalism and television ===
In 1973, starting her career in journalism, she was acclaimed by Prime Minister Constantine Karamanlis as the "kid of New Democracy", a designation she herself denied a while later. In the next decades Kanelli worked as a daily columnist, a reporter at home and abroad, a news anchor and television presenter, host and interviewer. She also worked as a radio host and presenter. Often playing the role of media polemicist, she is noted for her forthright, irreverent, incisive and arrogant style which is criticized by her detractors and applauded by her supporters.

==== Liana ====
In 1992 she was given her own self-titled talk show Liana (also called Liana K. in Greek language rebroadcasts outside of Greece). The show was widely popular and gained her much notoriety in Greece and surrounding Greek-speaking regions (such as North Macedonia and southern Albania), though it lasted only one year, due largely to some of the controversial views she presented.

After the show was canceled, it remained quite popular through the practice of underground tape trading in Eastern Europe. The trading of pirated videos and music had become quite commonplace throughout the 1980s and 1990s as so many western films were outlawed in Eastern Bloc nations (as seen in the documentary Chuck Norris vs. Communism).

=== Politics ===
In 1999, Kanelli announced from the podium of a rally protesting the Kosovo War and the NATO bombing of Yugoslavia that she would run as a candidate for the Communist Party of Greece for the European Parliament. In the 2000 national election, she was elected as a Member of the Hellenic Parliament for Athens' first electoral district, a seat she has successfully held by being re-elected in every election since (2004, 2007 and 2009).

While sitting in Parliament, Kanelli continues to work as a journalist with more than 35 years of professional experience in newspaper, radio and television media. She is currently the editor of Greece's communist newspaper Rizospastis. She has also been elected to the boards of several of Greece's leading journalists' unions.

==== Defense of Milosevic (2004) ====
Liana Kanelli, a member of the International Committee for the Defense of Milosevic, testified at the Trial of Slobodan Milošević in October 2004. She attacked the United States and their allies, calling them "neo-nazis" and blaming them for the death of many innocent civilians. She also claimed Milošević would be with the "winners" instead of the "defeated" if he had cooperated more with western leaders.

==== On-air assault (2012) ====
In June 2012, during a live talk show, Kanelli was struck three times in the shoulders and the face by Golden Dawn spokesman Ilias Kasidiaris, a former army Special forces officer with a checkered criminal past. Kanelli pushed him away after Kasidiaris threw water across the news desk at another guest, and a warrant was issued for Kasidiaris' arrest immediately following the on air incident. The show stopped broadcasting after the melee, at which time, according to Kanelli, Kasidiaris was forced into a room and the door was closed and locked, but that before police could arrive he broke the door down and fled the scene. According to Greek law, such a warrant must be served by police within 24 hours. Following the incident, which gained international attention, Golden Dawn claimed Kanelli assaulted Kasidiaris first by throwing a packet of documents into his face.

==== Al Jazeera interview (2013) ====
Kanelli has been an outspoken opponent of Greece's entry into the European Union and adoption of the Euro as a currency. In an October 2013 interview with Al Jazeera's Empire program in Athens she caused a stir by stating that Brussels and Berlin had utilized "imposing and blackmailing politics" to mislead Greece into accepting the currency.

=== Author ===
Kanelli has written three books: “Thoughts”, “Function of Oaths” and “Rwanda”.

She also established NEMECIS magazine in 1997.

== Filmography ==
=== Television ===
Year	Title	Role(s)	Notes	Ref.
1972-1973	Today	Herself (reporter)	Daytime news show on YENED	
1975-1981	ERT Central News	Herself (anchor)	National television evening news	
1976-1977	The Portrait of Thursday with Freddie Germanos	Herself (co-host)	Talk show	
1978	Saturday night, Sunday morning with Freddie Germanos	Herself (co-host)	Talk show	
1982	The survivors	Herself	1 episode	
1986-1989	Are you talking in Greek? with Liana Kanelli	Herself (host)	Talk show on ERT	
1989-1991	MEGA Central News	Herself (anchor)	Monday to Friday evening news on MEGA	
1989-1992	Hands up with Liana Kanelli	Herself (host)	Talk show on MEGA	
1989	The MEGA Christmas Show	Herself (host)	MEGA TV special	
1992	Weekend ERT	Herself (host)	Weekend talk show on ERT	
1992	Black and White in Greece	Herself (host)	Talk show on ERT	
1992	Because of an oath with Liana Kanelli	Herself (host)	Talk show on ERT	
1993	ANT1 Central News	Herself (anchor)	Saturday to Sunday evening news on ANT1	
1993	Liana with Liana Kanelli	Herself (host)	Daytime talk show	
1994-1995	Skai Central News	Herself (anchor)	Monday to Friday evening news on Skai TV	
1994-1995	Tea with Liana Kanelli	Herself (host)	Talk show on Skai TV	
1995	SKAI right now	Herself (host)	Late night talk show on Skai TV	
1995	Live Stories with Liana Kanelli	Herself (host)	Talk show on ERT	
1995-1996	ERT Central News	Herself (anchor)	National television evening news	
1996-1998	Don't upset my day! with Liana Kanelli	Herself (host)	Daytime talk show on MEGA	
1998	Two Strangers	Herself	1 episode	
1998-1999	Late night X-press with Liana Kanelli	Herself (host)	Late night talk show on MEGA	
1999	The seven deadly sins with Liana Kanelli	Herself (host)	Late night talk show on Seven X	
1999-2000	The good news are burnt beautifully! with Liana Kanelli	Herself (host)	Daytime talk show on Alter 5	
2000-2001	EXTRA Central News	Herself (anchor)	Monday to Friday evening news on Extra Channel	
2001	The red with Liana Kanelli	Herself (host)	Talk show on 902 TV	
2001-2002	TEMPO Central News	Herself (anchor)	Monday to Friday evening news on Tempo TV	
2002	On a shaved edge with Liana Kanelli	Herself (host)	Late night talk show on Alpha TV	
2007	In the Nick of Time	Herself	1 episode	

== Personal life ==
Kanelli is an Orthodox Christian.

== Humanitarian efforts and awards ==
A member of EEDYE (Greek Committee for International Peace and Detente), Kanelli has been awarded by various associations and organizations as a journalist and politician for her social and anti-racist efforts. This includes the National Silver Medal presented to her in 2015 by Serbian President Tomislav Nikolić for "exceptional merits in public and cultural activities".

She also visited Armenia in 2016 to promote peace in the region with Azerbaijan and Nagorno-Karabakh, blaming "capitalist rivalries" for previous bloodshed there.
