= Epirus TV1 =

Epirus TV1 (Ήπειρος TV1)
- Country: Greece
- Headquarters: Skopouli St. 43, Ioannina, 45332

Programming
- Language: Greek

Ownership
- Owner: Radiotelevision Operations Epirus S.A.

History
- Launched: 1990

Links
- Website: Live streaming

Availability

Terrestrial
- Digea: 33 UHF (Corfu, Delvinaki, Dodoni, Filiates, Igoumenitsa, Metsovo, Mitsikeli, Molossoi, Paramythia, Vasiliko, Zagori); 39 UHF (Acarnania, Amfilochia, Arta, Fanari, Lakka Souliou); 43 UHF (Ainos, Fyteies, Ithaca)

Epirus TV1 (formerly abbreviated as TV1) is a Greek television channel of Ioannina. It broadcasts in Epirus, in western Central Greece, in Ionian islands, in northwestern Peloponnese, in western Evrytania, in northwestern Ilia and in west parts of Trikala and Karditsa.

== Ownership ==
Epirus TV1 started operating in 1990, with its headquarters located in Petrovouni, Ioannina. Radiotelevision Operations Epirus S.A. was founded on June 22, 1995, in order to operate the station, and extend its signal to the whole regional unit. In 1998, the headquarters were moved to Anatoli, alongside the ones of its sister radio station, Radio Epirus. As of 2001, there would be 15 transmitting areas extending the signal to the unit, as well as small parts of Epirus' other ones.

== Programming ==
Its programming would include Greek and foreign films, as well as Greek and folk music.

- I Ora ton Politeknon - show with issues regarding families with many children; presented by the president of the Many-Children Society of Ioannina, Kostas Mpalomenos.
- En Xoro - cultural show; presented by Hlias Gartzonikas. (-2001)
- Sfragida - news program; presented by Melina Gerodimou.
- Anoixtes Diadromes - news program; presented by Vaso Skoulika.
- Gallop - news program; presented by Vilian Stasinou.
- Mesimeri me Ypografi - news program; presented by Vilian Stasinou.
- Highlights - entertainment show; presented by Lia Lappa. (-2001)
- 7 Imeres se 60 Lepta - news program; presented by Aleksia Kosma.
- Athlitiko Panorama - sports show; presented by Ksanthi Matsi.

== Controversy ==
On April 6, 2012, during the broadcasting of the channel's evening news bulletin, 17 intruders, whose faces were hidden behind handkerchiefs, broke into the studio and threw eggs and yogurt at newscaster Panagiotis Vourhas, as he took an interview from the publicity of far-right neo-Nazi political party Golden Dawn on the news program En Logo the week before. The event received worldwide coverage from well-known news broadcasting networks, such as BBC News, The Daily Telegraph and Daily Mail.
