= WPSO =

- New Port Richey, Florida; United States
- Broadcast area: Tarpon Springs, Florida
- Frequency: 1500 kHz
- Branding: Greek Voice Radio

Programming
- Format: Greek variety

Ownership
- Owner: ASA; (ASA Broadcast Network, Inc.)
- Sister stations: WXYB, WZRA-CD

History
- First air date: October 31, 1963
- Former call signs: WGUL (1963–1985)
- Call sign meaning: West Pasco

Technical information
- Licensing authority: FCC
- Facility ID: 685
- Class: D
- Power: 250 watts day
- Transmitter coordinates: 28°15′32″N 82°43′45″W
- Translator: 101.9 W270DH (New Port Richey)

Links
- Public license information: Public file; LMS
- Website: wpso.com

WPSO (1500 AM) is a radio station broadcasting a Greek variety format. It is licensed to New Port Richey, Florida, United States, and is owned by Angelatos Broadcasting.

The station signed on October 31, 1963 as WGUL. After that station relocated in 1985 to 860 AM, the call letters were changed to WPSO. The station began broadcasting in Greek in 1992.
