= Odyssey Television Network =

Canadian licensed Greek language television broadcaster

Odyssey Television Network, Inc.
- Company type: Private
- Industry: Broadcasting
- Founded: 1996
- Headquarters: Toronto, Ontario, Canada
- Key people: John Maniatakos, Chairman & CEO; Peter Maniatakos, Founder
- Products: Ethnic Broadcasting
- Owner: John Maniatakos
- Website: www.odysseytv.ca

Odyssey Television Network, Inc. is a Canadian licensed Greek language television broadcaster who owns and operates three national ethnic channels, available via cable and satellite. Headquartered in Toronto, Ontario, the company has been in operation since 1996 and is headed by John Maniatakos, son of longtime Greek-Canadian broadcasting stalwart, Peter Maniatakos.

== Channels ==
Alternate OTN logo

Odyssey Television Network currently operates the following three Greek-language television channels:

- Odyssey (OTN1)
- ERT World Canada (OTN2)
- MEGA Cosmos Canada (OTN3)

In addition to the 3 channels that it has launched itself, Odyssey TV also distributes a number of foreign services in Canada. OTN is the official Canadian distributor for the following channels:

- Alpha Sat
- Greek Cinema
- SportPlus
- Star International

== Local programming ==
As part of its mandate to serve Canadians of Greek descent and offer programming of relevance to them, Odyssey Television Network airs an array of local programming on all of its channels including original productions as well as acquired programming from independent producers.

=== Original productions ===
- Afternoon Magazine (Απογευματινό Μαγαζίνο) - Re-broadcasting of CHTO AM 1690 afternoon program; airs Monday-Friday on Odyssey
- Canadian News (Καναδική Eπικαιρότητα) - Daily news bulletin in Greek, overview of the main national news headlines; airs Monday-Friday on Odyssey & MEGA Cosmos Canada

=== Independent productions ===
- Edo Montreal (Εδώ Montreal) - Weekly program focusing on Montreal Greek community; airs Sundays on Odyssey
- Mazi Ston Kanada
- Laval & Montreal - Weekly news magazine that features news and interviews with members of the Greek community in Montreal; airs Saturdays on Odyssey
- Orthodox Voice (Ορθόδοξη Φωνή) - Faith-based program about Greek Orthodox religion, produced by the Greek Orthodox Metropolis of Canada; airs Sundays on Odyssey
- Pame Mia Volta
- Zontas Pragmatika - Religious program about Christianity produced by Alpha-Omega Christian Ministries; airs Saturdays on Odyssey

=== Former productions ===
- Elliniko Panorama - Weekly news magazine that features news and interviews with members of the Greek community in Toronto; airs Sundays on Odyssey
- Personalities (Προσωπικότητες) - Weekly talk show featuring in-depth discussion with Greek Canadians from all walks of life who have excelled in their chosen field.

The current number of Canadians who are of Greek origin is 271,405, with the majority situated in either Toronto or Montreal.

== Personalities ==
Current on-air personalities at Odyssey Television:

- Natassa Haralambopoulou, host of Canadian News
- Peter Milonas, co-host of Afternoon Magazine
- George Galatsis, co-host of Afternoon Magazine
- Katerina Papadopoulos, fill-in host on Canadian News
- John Cocconas, host of Edo Montreal
- Konstantinos Zampakikas, fill-in host on Fisaei Vardaris

== Odyssey TV Plus ==
In April 2025, OTN launched Odyssey TV Plus, a subscription-based streaming service that allows viewers to access the 7 channels that Odyssey TV operates / distributes. The app is currently available through Amazon Fire TV, Android Mobile, Android TV, Apple TV, iOS Mobile, Roku and Web Live TV (via odysseytvplus.ca).
