= WZRA-CD =

Television station in Oldsmar, Florida

- Oldsmar–Clearwater–; St. Petersburg–Tampa, Florida; United States
- City: Oldsmar, Florida
- Channels: Digital: 15 (UHF); Virtual: 48
- Branding: TV-48

Programming
- Affiliations: ERT World / YTA TV / NTV / RAI

Ownership
- Owner: Angelatos Broadcasting; (Amka Broadcast Network, Inc.)

History
- Founded: late 1990s
- Former call signs: W48AY (to early 2000s)
- Former channel number: Analog: 48 (late 1990s–2015)
- Former affiliations: America One, RT

Technical information
- Licensing authority: FCC
- Facility ID: 2130
- Class: CD
- ERP: 12.1 kW
- HAAT: 88.6 m (291 ft)
- Transmitter coordinates: 28°15′33″N 82°43′45.4″W

Links
- Public license information: Public file; LMS
- Website: wzra48.com

WZRA-CD (channel 48) is a low-power, Class A television station licensed to Oldsmar, Florida, United States, serving ethnic groups in the Tampa Bay area. The station carries a variety of mostly news-oriented programming from broadcasters outside the United States, in several languages.

In Pinellas County, WZRA-CD is available on WOW! cable TV channel 122 and on Spectrum digital channel 948. WZRA is also on channel 24 on Verizon FiOS throughout the market, as far south as Sarasota County. The station also offers a live feed of its programming on the Internet.

== History ==
When the station signed on in the late-1990s, channel 48 went by the translator-style call sign W48AY, and used the moniker 'Bay TV'. When the station became a Class A station in the early 2000s, the call sign changed to WZRA-CA, as allocated by the Federal Communications Commission (FCC).

WZRA originally had its transmitter in Oldsmar, broadcasting at 41.7 kW. They since relocated to facilities near the corner of US 19 and Palmetto Road in Port Richey, broadcasting from a 150 kW transmitter covering west Pasco and southwestern Hernando counties, but with reduced coverage in Hillsborough County and central Pinellas County. They have since filed a construction permit to flash cut channel 48 to a digital signal, still broadcasting from Port Richey, but at 15 kW. On July 8, 2015, this construction permit was granted.

As of April 2017, WZRA-CD only broadcast programming on channel 48.3.

== Programming ==
Most of WZRA's programming is in Greek, aimed at the Greek audience in Tarpon Springs, but the channel also offers programming in Italian and English.

WZRA also presents daily newscasts from Greece (from ERT), which (reflecting the station's Greek ownership) makes up the majority of the station's evening, overnight and Sunday programming. The station carries programs from the national broadcasters in Russia (RT) and Italy (RAI) as well as local news from Newfoundland's NTV, aimed at Canadian "snowbirds". WZRA carried newscasts from the CTV Television Network in the early 21st century; they also carried Dini Petty's CTV talk show, via NTV, until CTV canceled the series' repeats in the early 2000s. The station carries general entertainment programs from YTA TV during the morning hours between Monday and Saturday.

== Bright House dispute in Tarpon Springs ==
Until mid-February 2006, WZRA was seen on Bright House channel 15 in the Tarpon Springs area. WZRA was then replaced with Tarpon Springs' local government channel, which, at its debut, was mainly a promo loop for an upcoming municipal election, plus live City Commission meetings.

Prior to December 2007 (when all local public service channels moved to the digital tier), Bright House allocated channel 15 for local government-access television in Pinellas County, and had given that slot to WZRA on an interim basis, until Tarpon Springs started their own channel. With WZRA being a low-power station, Bright House was not obligated to carry the channel. Since being dropped, WZRA received thousands of calls in support of the station, especially from the Greek community. WZRA's station manager, Angelos Angelatos, urged viewers to call Bright House, as well as its vice president, Mike Robertson, direct. Angelatos and his brother, talk show host Sam Angelatos, said that Bright House's discontinuation of WZRA was a form of discrimination, favoring the Hispanic community with four Spanish channels, while ignoring and mistreating other ethnic groups.

In July 2006, Bright House gave WZRA a permanent home, on digital channel 948 in northern Pinellas County. WZRA was slated to be dropped from Bright House by the end of April 2011. As of March 2014, however, the station is still part of the Bright House line-up. Despite the transmitter relocation to Port Richey, in Pasco County, WZRA is still only carried on Spectrum cable in northern Pinellas County.

== Subchannel ==
Subchannel of WZRA-CD
Subchannel	Res.	Short name	Programming
35.1	480i		Main WZRA-CD programming

== See also ==
- WPSO and WXYB, radio sister stations of WZRA
