= Odyssey (play-by-mail game) =

Play-by-mail fantasy game

- Publishers: Gamer's Den
- Genres: heroic fantasy, play-by-mail
- Languages: English
- Players: varies
- Playing time: unlimited
- Materials required: Instructions, order sheets, turn results, paper, pencil
- Media type: Play-by-mail or email

Odyssey is a heroic fantasy, play-by-mail (PBM) game.

== History and development ==
Odyssey was a computer moderated, play-by-mail game published by Gamer's Den. It was a heroic fantasy game.

The game's first module was Heroes' Quest, available for 30–50 players. In the July–August 1997 issue of Paper Mayhem, the publisher announced the release of its second module, Only the Strong, written by Mark Montero and available as a play-by-email (PBEM) game. It had six factions: The Realm, The Kingdom of Melborne, The League of Chaos, The Children of Scourge, The Greenskins, and The Dark Council. Novices could play the New Frontiers module. A third module was Black Piper.

== Gameplay ==
Gameplay was extended, but with victory conditions, making it a closed-ended game. Elements of gameplay included fantasy adventure, conquest, and exploration. Factions did not appear in the first module, but Only the Strong featured six factions while Black Piper had two warring factions.

== Reception ==
Reviewer Douglas W. Bierbower, in the January–February 1996 issue of Paper Mayhem magazine placed the game's quality over others in the genre: Alamaze, Hyborian War, Legends, Middle Earth, Olympia, and Suzerainty.

== See also ==
- List of play-by-mail games

== Bibliography ==
- Barton, Andrew (March–April 1996). "The Best of Both Worlds [Magelords and Odyssey]". Flagship. No. 60 (US ed.). pp. 23–25.
- Bierbower, Douglas W. (January–February 1996). "Odyssey". Paper Mayhem. No. 76. pp. 6–9.
- Gamer's Den (July–August 1997). "Gameline: Gamer's Den". Paper Mayhem. No. 85. pp. 15–16.
- Holm, Dana (July–August 1997). "Multi-Class Characters in Odyssey". Paper Mayhem. No. 85. p. 31.
- Smith, Richard L. (September–October 1997). "Odyssey: The Choices Are Many!". Paper Mayhem. No. 86. pp. 20–21.
- Cameron, George (March–April 1998). "Chaos Rules Baby! (Only The Strong Odyssey Module)". Paper Mayhem. No. 89. pp. 8–9.
- Smith, Richard L. (March–April 1998). "The Black Piper of the Crystal Plains". Paper Mayhem. No. 89. pp. 10–12.
