= Social Business Channel =

Greek financial television channel

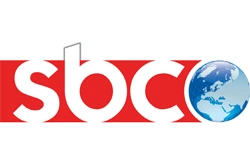
- Country: Greece
- Headquarters: Irakleio, Attica

Programming
- Language: Greek
- Picture format: 576i (SDTV)

Ownership
- Owner: SBC TV S.A.

History
- Launched: December 2005
- Closed: End of 2022 (as tv channel)

Links
- Website: sbctv.gr

The Social Business Channel (otherwise known as SBC) was a television channel (initially subscription, later free-to-air and until the end of its operation online) based in Irakleio, Attica and the first and only free thematic television channel for the economy in Greece. The station began operating in December 2005 and broadcast many programs on the stock market, the economy and movement, in Greek and international markets. With the arrival of Naftemporiki TV in September 2022, it ceased to exist as a television channel, continuing to operate as a news website.

== Certification and awards ==
The SBC was certified according to the international standard of ISO 9001:2000 by Bureau Veritas and was distinguished by the President of Athens Exchange Spyros Capralos during the first meeting of Athens Exchange of 2007. It was also made interviews, which occupied the mass media, as the governor of Bank of Greece George Provopoulos, the head of the ASPIS Group Paul Psomiadis, the former economy minister Giorgos Papakonstantinou, the CEO of Hellas Sat Christodoulos Protopapas, Doctor Kapositas etc.

== Partnerships and emission stopping ==
Collaborating with the most reputable global financial networks, Bloomberg and RT while the channel projected in all displays of the Athens Exchange.

== Coverage ==
=== Terrestrial digital and analog ===
In the first years of its operation, SBC also broadcast terrestrial analog, as a regional station in Attica, many times obtaining a temporary and not legal license, concluding from 2005 to 2018 various partnerships with several legal regional channels of Attica, in order to produce a program from a terrestrial frequency, through the indirect route, such as with Local TV (then as informative channel, now Nickelodeon Greece), Channel 9 (now One Channel), Channel 10 (later Sunny Channel, now Alert TV), RTP Center TV from Corinth and the memory grinder TV Thessaloniki, which channels had a certain time to broadcast their program, on the SBC.

In fact, the Sunny Channel violated the broadcasting legislation and by committing commercial management and exploitation of the channel by the SBC company, which is strictly prohibited by law, while RTP Center and TV Thessaloniki were legally forbidden to broadcast it, because they violated many times the legislation, having in fact to a large extent the absence of an autonomous program.

=== Notable incidents ===
In the first years of its operation, in 2005 as Satellite Business Channel as it was also broadcasting by satellite, it was considered to be the continuation of the once national station Tempo TV, because it suddenly left its analogue frequency from Hymettus (22 UHF), two years after its final closure, in 2003 (but this is not true, because the two channels were different companies).

In the second beginning, it broadcast from two centers of Attica, Parnitha (49 UHF) and Hymettus (35 UHF) from where Local TV (now Nickelodeon) was broadcast and at the same time from the old Tempo frequency (22 UHF) which had been granted to ERT to broadcast the Parliament channel and from Aegina (50 UHF).

On June 15, 2010, SBC's broadcast is online only following a decision by EETT to interrupt its telecast by Hymettus. The interruption of the station brought a storm of reactions from TV viewers and investors, even leading to the unemployment of 80 workers.

In early July of that year, after SBC's imminent discontinuation by Local TV the second station changed ownership and on July 12 returned to its old frequencies (35 and 49 UHF) and old name, rebroadcasting Nickelodeon. On July 31, former executives of the station entered into discussions with Channel 9 in order for SBC to broadcast temporarily through the latter, covering 30% of the television time, while on September 3, Local TV became the current Greek franchise of Nickelodeon. In the end, Channel 9 decided to broadcast instead, a program of original financial shows, hosted by the aforementioned executives and led by Panagiotis Bousborelis, who had also left the SBC.

On January 14, 2013, Jeronimo Groovy S.A. which owns the regional Sunny Channel (now Alert TV), had signed a contract with SBC TV S.A. for the commercial management and exploitation of the channel, something that is strictly prohibited by law, while Sunny itself fired all its staff, exceeding every limit, with the NCRTV asking for clarification. However, on February 2, SBC started rebroadcasting from Sunny's frequency, replacing it illegally rather than legally.

From March 2013 until July 2014, part of the SBC program was rebroadcast in Thessaloniki and Central Macedonia by the local channel TV Thessaloniki, which has ceased operations.

As of 1 August 2014, SBC is legally mandated to broadcast digitally only via Digea's terrestrial platform from 13 broadcasting centers in Attica and Evia, a year later, Digea then permanently stopped broadcasting SBC forcing Sunny's return whose program was largely degraded by showing old programs and endless hours of telemarketing, which in the spring of 2016 was renamed to today's Alert TV, whose program was also enriched with dozens of news programs supporting far-right politics.

On March 8, 2018, the NCRTV did not recognize SBC's right to legally operate, by ordering Digea to stop its terrestrial transmission, which was done on the evening of June 20. However the station continued to be broadcast online and satellite via Cosmote TV (channel 654) where it was available from 14 December 2012 until 25 November 2018 while earlier from 8 October 2018 to late 2022, SBC was terrestrially rebroadcast from Attica TV as a nasted program which channel returned to the platform from 13 January 2023 airing one channel higher (653).

== Ownership ==
In 1991, VCA (Video and Computer Applications) Television and Cinema Enterprises S.A. was established as a continuation of Electronic Applications Ltd. One of the founders is Ilias Kopanitsas, who participated as a shareholder and general director in Tempo TV from the beginning of the financial problems until its closure. In Tempo's place, it broadcasts for a week a pirate channel called Neo, while VCA, before the operation of the SBC, submitted an application for a regional free-to-air license and also for a satellite pay-tv license.

In 2008, the company was renamed as SBC TV Enterprises S.A. having its facilities in Irakleio, Attica which since December 2022 have been removed but remain at the same address and now active as a news website. Kopanitsas, however, donated the station's equipment to the Hellenic Broadcast Culture Center in Chalcis, which also owns part of Tempo TV's equipment.
