= SportPlus TV =

SportPlus
- Country: Greece
- Broadcast area: North America; South America; Europe; Middle East; Africa; South Asia; Asia-Pacific; Australia

History
- Launched: August 24, 2014

Links
- Website: SportPlus

SportPlus is a Greek language sports channel that airs the best sporting leagues and competitions from Greece. It is the first 24-hour sports channel in the world aimed at the Greek diaspora.

SportPlus airs live and tape delayed matches from Greek Super League, Football League and Basket League. It also airs news and highlights shows.

== Availability ==
SportPlus originally launched on 24 August 2014 in the United States on Dish Network. It subsequently launched in Australia on the MySat platform. On 26 March 2015, SportPlus launched in Canada on Bell Fibe TV via a partnership with Odyssey Television Network.
