= Greek Music Television =

Greek Music Television (GMTV)
- Country: United States
- Broadcast area: National
- Headquarters: New York City

Programming
- Picture format: 4:3 (576i, SDTV)

History
- Launched: October 2007

Greek Music Television or GMtv is a 24-hour lifestyle channel that broadcasts exclusively for Greek viewers in North America. It launched in October 2007 exclusively on DirecTV under the direction of Petros Hatjopoulos. GMtv is aimed at the Greek youth of America with a diverse programming mix ranging from music video clips, movie news, fashion tips and pop culture reports. Music content includes exclusive interviews with Greece's top artists, concerts, behind the scenes footage and other special programming. On March 31, 2011, GMtv was removed from DirecTV along with all other Greek services. GMtv became available on the Home2US platform in May 2011.

== Programs ==
- GMTV News
- GMTV Top 10
- Glitter Talk- flagship lifestyle program, produced in NYC; airs weekly
- It's Your Call - All request show where viewers make submissions via Twitter

== See also ==
- Blue
