= Gender Balance Council =

The Gender Balance Council (GBC) is an Emirati federal entity responsible for developing and implementing the gender balance agenda in the United Arab Emirates.

The Council is chaired by Manal bint Mohammed bin Rashid Al Maktoum, President of Dubai Women Establishment. The Council's responsibility include reviewing current legislation, policies and programs, and proposing or updating new legislation or programs in order to achieve gender balance in the workplace reduce the gender gap across all government sectors, enhance the UAE's ranking in global competitiveness reports on gender equality and achieve gender balance in decision-making positions, as well as promote the UAE's status as a benchmark for gender balance legislation.

== History ==
In August 2016, the GBC announced the establishment of a committee to review the law and to activate the Gender Balance Index across various sectors. In August 2016, The GBC announced it would review the country's maternity law, and some private sector firms have already enhanced their policies.

In 2019, the organization awarded gender balance index awards – which celebrate efforts to reduce the gender gap within the federal government and to promote equal opportunities to genders. A tweet which celebrated the awards sparked derision on the social media sites as well as media outlets, with critics noting the awards being handed all to men. According to the Gender Balance Council, the awards were handed to the entities head, which happened to be men.

== Responsibilities of the Council ==
The Gender Balance Council's goal is to achieve female empowerment. The GBC's role consists of bridging the gap between women and men and enhancing the UAE's global status in the matter. The GBC undertakes several legal roles, notably the review of legislation introduced and policies proposed in the matter of gender balance, but also seeks to balance rights like nationality rights, divorce rights, guardianship and custody rights, inheritance rights, freedom of movement, protection from child marriage, and protection from gender-based violence.

=== Structure ===
The hierarchy of the council as of 2019 is as follows:

1. Mona Al Marri, Director General of the Government of Dubai Media Office, Vice President of the Gender Balance Council
2. Younis Haji Al Khouri, Undersecretary of the UAE Ministry of Finance
3. Abdullah Nasser Lootah, Director-General of the Federal Competitiveness and Statistics Authority
4. Noura Khalifa Al Suwaidi, Secretary-General of the General Women's Union
5. Dr. Abdul Rahman Al Awar, Director-General of the Federal Authority of Government Human Resources
6. Abdullah bin Ahmed Al Saleh, Undersecretary for Foreign Trade and Industry at the UAE Ministry of Economy
7. Reem Al Falasi, Secretary-General of the Supreme Council for Motherhood and Childhood
8. Dr. Omar Abdul Rahman Salem Al Nuaimi, Assistant Under-Secretary for Communications and International Relations at the Ministry of Human Resources and Emiratisation
9. Hessa Tahlak, Assistant Undersecretary of Social Development at the Ministry of Community Development
10. Huda Al Hashimi, Assistant Director-General for Strategy and Innovation at the Prime Minister's Office
11. Abdullah Hamdan Al Naqbi, Director of the Legal Affairs Department at the Ministry of Foreign Affairs and International Cooperation
12. Shamsa Saleh, Secretary-General of the Gender Balance Council

== See also ==
- Gender Equality Index
- Culture of the United Arab Emirates
