= Magenta Cinema =

Greek television service

- Country: Greece

Programming
- Language: Greek
- Picture format: 576i (SDTV); 1080i (HDTV)

Ownership
- Owner: OTE
- Sister channels: Magenta History; Magenta Sport; Magenta Series; Village Cinema

History
- Launched: 5 November 2012
- Former names: OTE Cinema (2012–2016); Cosmote Cinema (2016–2026)

Magenta Cinema is a pay television service/channel line-up available in Greece that broadcasts blockbuster movies and hit series. It launched on 5 November 2012 as OTE Cinema. It was renamed on 14 November 2016 to Cosmote Cinema. It is owned by OTE, who own and operate Magenta TV a satellite television service and Magenta Sport—a sports channel. Cosmote Cinema is a 24/7 service and it features hit series from UK and blockbusters movies from Greece and abroad. It also features shows with showbiz news, making of, deleted scenes and backstage.

Recently, Magenta Cinema has entered into an exclusive agreement with Walt Disney Pictures. As a result, it gives Cosmote Cinema exclusive rights to the coverage of the Academy Awards. It also has agreements in place with Universal Pictures and Paramount Pictures, the latter of which has been extended into becoming the distributor for Paramount+ content in Greece since 2024.

== Channels and content ==
Magenta Cinema operates four multiplex channels:

- Magenta Cinema 1HD: The premiere's channel, features blockbusters, premieres, family, action and adventure movies.
- Magenta Cinema 2HD: It features comedy, romance, horror movies. It also features favourite selections from great movies that stood out due to the actors, directors, awards or box office, and as well as thematic evenings with special cinema tributes.
- Magenta Cinema 3HD: It features Greek movies from 1960 to today.
- Magenta Series HD: It features hit series. It used to be known as Cosmote Cinema 4HD until September 2, 2019.
- Magenta Series Marathon

=== Special Events ===
Magenta Cinema 1HD and Magenta Cinema 2HD features special events such as the Academy Awards and European Film Awards.

=== Hit Series ===
Magenta Series HD features all of the following series:

==== Current ====
- A Discovery of Witches
- A Million Little Things
- Berlin Station
- Better Things
- Billions
- Charmed
- Designated Survivor
- Deutschland 86
- Fargo
- FBI
- Happy!
- I Feel Bad
- Jamestown
- Knightfall
- Last Week Tonight with John Oliver
- Luther
- MacGyver
- Madam Secretary
- Magnum P.I.
- Mary Kills People
- McMafia
- Mr. Robot
- New Amsterdam
- Orange Is the New Black
- Peaky Blinders
- Private Eyes
- Riviera
- Sherlock
- The Affair
- The Bold Type
- The Durrells
- The Good Place
- The Last Kingdom
- The New Pope
- The Resident
- The Rookie
- Tin Star
- The Turkish Detective
- Top of the Lake
- Trapped
- Travelers
- Urban Myths
- Victoria
- Will & Grace

==== Former ====
- Aquarius
- Atlantis
- Beowulf: Return to the Shieldlands
- Chasing Life
- Chicago Justice
- Childhood's End
- Colony
- Conviction
- DCI Banks
- Defiance
- Dominion
- Doubt
- Downton Abbey
- Emerald City
- Extant
- Fortitude
- From Dusk till Dawn: The Series
- From the Earth to the Moon
- Girlfriends' Guide to Divorce
- Heartbeat
- Hemlock Grove
- Heroes
- Heroes Reborn
- House of Cards
- Ice
- Imposters
- Madoff
- Manifest
- Mapp & Lucia
- Midnight, Texas
- Mozart in the Jungle
- No Tomorrow
- Oliver Twist
- Orphan Black
- Ripper Street
- Rock & Chips
- Salvation
- Satisfaction
- Six
- South of Hell
- SS-GB
- Star Trek: The Original Series
- Taken
- Texas Rising
- The Great Indoors
- The Hollow Crown
- The Musketeers
- The Mystery of Edwin Drood
- The Odd Couple
- Twin Peaks
- Twin Peaks: The Return
- Unreal
- War & Peace
- Wynonna Earp
- Zen
- Zoo

=== Original programming ===
- Dia Tayta a legal comedy drama by Lakis Lazopoulos, co-production with the terrestrial channel Alpha TV. It premiered on 4 November 2013 on OTE Cinema 2 and on 11 February 2014 on Alpha TV.
