= Tempo TV =

Defunct private Greek TV channel

- Country: Greece

Ownership
- Owner: New Channel Broadcasting Company S.A.

History
- Founded: 3 January 1990
- Launched: 17 February 1990
- Founder: Sotiris Kouvelas and Fotis Manousis
- Closed: 17 October 2003
- Former names: New Channel (1990-1999); New Tempo (1999-2000)

Tempo TV (originally New Channel) was a Greek private television station of nationwide scope, based in Athens. New Channel was the fourth television station in a row to operate in Greece after the launch of Mega Channel, ANT1 and Channel 29.

It got its first name from its namesake owner company. During the Mitsotakis government in the two years 1993-1994, it obtained a temporary license, valid for seven years (1993-2000), without financial compensation, like all other national television stations.

== History ==
=== Preparation and first broadcast ===
A few days before the first broadcasts, the channel is advertised in magazines and newspapers. The station started broadcasting on February 17, 1990, from Thessaloniki as New Channel with its founders Sotiris Kouvelas (who was mayor of Thessaloniki in the period 1986-1989 where he founded the municipal radio and television) and the businessman and then general secretary of the Ministry for the Environment, Physical Planning and Public Works Fotis Manousis.

New Channel was originally the Athenian version of the municipal local initially channel as they had collaborated with each other for a long time, exchanging programs and news bulletins (mainly the short ones) while in the evening the television station was networked with the Municipal Radio of Thessaloniki, FM 100.

=== The first programs ===
Then, from a relatively low-key start, New Channel made an effort to capture a larger share of viewership from 1992 onwards, buying and rebroadcasting popular foreign series such as Dynasty, also showing Greek series of its own production such as "The Price (To timima)", "Show and harmless (Show kai avlaves)" and "Our police department (To astinomiko mas tmima)", which were not particularly successful, and were discontinued after a certain number of episodes.

In the period 1993-1996, the station began broadcasting Greek basketball games, specifically from the Greek cup. At the same time the channel broadcast the first show of Makis Triantafyllopoulos entitled Yellow Journalism (Kitrinos Typos) and the first lifestyle show with artistic news and news about the showbiz personalities entitled Myths and Reality (Mythoi kai Pragmatikotita) presented by Dimitris Papanotas, who was also the presenter of the station's first news bulletins.

Also, other similar shows were presented by the director Costas Kapetanidis, while Annita Pania with the Golden Sugarplum (Hrisso Koufeto) came from Makedonia TV. At the same time the channel aired some repeats of ANT1 series and music video clips from the Greek and foreign repertoire. Many well-known names such as Dimitris Konstantaras and Menya Papadopoulou passed from the news bulletins, while the channel did not hesitate to stir up the waters of free television with the show "Erotodikio", presented by Vicky Michalonakou together with Petros Leotsakos, Pepi Tsesmeli, Eleni Louka and guests from the "luben" area.

Other more well-known and later identical shows with the channel were Logodosmenoi presented by Yuli Iliopoulou (later transferred to the first Skai TV station, now Alpha TV) and Autophoro presented by Pepi Tsesmeli.

=== The acquisition and the new era ===
In December 1999 New Channel in order to become competitive with the other five major private television channels (MEGA, ANT1, STAR, the then newly founded ALPHA and Alter 5) and ERT changed ownership as it was sold to Stabilton S.A. of Michalis Androulidakis, who owned and published through Fourth Power S.A. and Clever Hellas Ltd. the newspapers Exousia and Ependytis respectively, with the purchase and sale agreement being signed on November 24 of the same year and which Stabilton acquired the Macedonian Spinning Mills.

On March 15, 2000 the station was renamed New Tempo and on October 23 of this year it ended up as Tempo TV (simply Tempo). However, the rise of the station's viewership was not as expected, as the station never had a lot of advertising time compared to the rest of the nationwide television stations, always expecting more commercials, which very quickly led it to the huge financial problems.

The newly founded Tempo had a strong start in its premiere, as it had a varied program through which the channel was radically upgraded and was also the first in Greece to launch the animation in its weather bulletin. At the dawn of the new millennium, the then Prime Minister Costas Simitis also attended the inauguration and presentation of the program of the newly established channel that took place at the Hilton Athens. The channel was set up for a very short time by Nikos Evangelatos, who took over the general management and the news department, where he set up a multi-member journalistic team, some of them coming from ERT, in which his wife Tatiana Stefanidou also participated. In fact, the channel had then launched the official slogan "See Tempo" (Gia des Tempo).

The plan for the then television data, turned out to be short-lived, because the limits were exceeded, reaching the capacity of employing more than 700 employees, at a time when the two former rival private channels MEGA and ANT1 did not have more than 400 employees, while Evangelatos left the channel in November 2001 due to the channel's financial problems and with Liana Kanelli taking over the presentation of the main news bulletin from December 3. Earlier on February 15, the publication of the newspaper "Exousia" stopped.

CNN's Turner Broadcasting System then sued Tempo for illegally rebroadcasting news on the network without a contract regarding the September 11 attacks.

=== The consequences and the end of an era ===
In 2002, the unprecedented TV data dispute between the unpaid TEMPO employees from the beginning of that year and its owner company started as a consequence of a crisis at the station, which dates back to the end of 2000 with late payment of accruals.

In March 2002 Androulidakis threatened to fire 40% of the staff while deciding to stop the news bulletins a move that was denounced by 66 of its journalists, the Journalists' Union of the Athens Daily Newspapers and the then presenter of the main news bulletin, Liana Kanelli.

The then MP of Synaspismos Panagiotis Lafazanis also spoke, in a relevant question he raised on the issue in Parliament for "radical and harmful change in the terms of employment contracts of dozens of journalists of political and news reporting, who are essentially fired by extortion."

The workers carried out strike mobilizations and then a work stoppage, filing at the same time insurance measures. On July 9, and on September 9 of the same year, they took control of the feed and the building of the channel, airing cards with their demands, but which feed was interrupted in between by Androulidakis to produce another feed from an unknown location with music video clips and premium lines (090). Following their lawsuits, on September 2nd, the prosecutor filed criminal charges against Androulidakis, who was arrested, and later released on December 10.

On the 13th of the same month, Androulidakis sued 33 employees of the station for, among other things, a "threat to his physical integrity" and "damage to his property", as a result of which the Units for the Reinstatement of Order invaded the premises to be arrested.

Because of the above, the ESR, having previously given September 18th a deadline of one month to resolve the problems, decided on October 22 that the channel should be closed, a decision that is annulled by the Council of State, while earlier the businessman tried to join the "New Channel Broadcasting Co. S.A." where the latter held 25% of its shares in a "special liquidation" status, stating that the company had debts amounting to 43,264,212.77 euros, as was the case with the smaller companies of the Androulidakis Group.

On April 8, 2003, the ESR decided again to shut down the channel, rejecting Androulidakis' proposal for a further deadline, as since the beginning of the year the station has been broadcasting messages of sexual content (mainly heterosexual and homosexual) and advertisements of astrology in the morning and in the afternoon hours, with which people's prejudices and superstitions are exploited, while both these messages and these advertisements cause a risk of moral damage to minors and people, something that is prohibited by the Constitution of Greece.

After six months (October 10, 2003), EETT permanently ceased its most illegal operation by confiscating its equipment, completely losing its national license, since 1993, without ever overcoming its serious financial problems. Then it started broadcasting in his place a pirate channel called Neo, broadcasting similar content, through the VCA studios, interests of Elias Kopanitsas. Its emission was denounced by Androulidakis, and stopped permanently on the 17th of the month, while the VCA later applied for a regional license.

That month saw the dismissal of the latest CEOs of both Tempo and the newly founded Alter Channel, while earlier its viewership were very low (up to 3% with the largest reaching 7%), and Stabilton's stake in the channel had begun to fall.

== Availability ==
Tempo had a wide network of frequencies broadcast analogically and covered several regions of Greece, such as Athens (22 UHF from Hymettus and 59 UHF from Parnitha), Thessaloniki (35 UHF from Chortiatis and 49 UHF from Philippion), Thessaly (64 UHF from Pelion) and Thasos (57 UHF). With its final closure in 2003, the frequencies were freed up to be occupied over the years, both by pirate (some with TV Chat), and by legitimate local, regional ones (such as the former TV Piraeus now Rise which occupied the frequency of Parnitha) and some nationwide channels (such as Seven now Skai TV which at the time did not have nationwide frequencies and the former Alter) including the public channels (such as ET1 which occupied the frequency of Philippion). It also broadcast by subscription via NOVA with direct feed nationwide to dozens of analog repeaters.

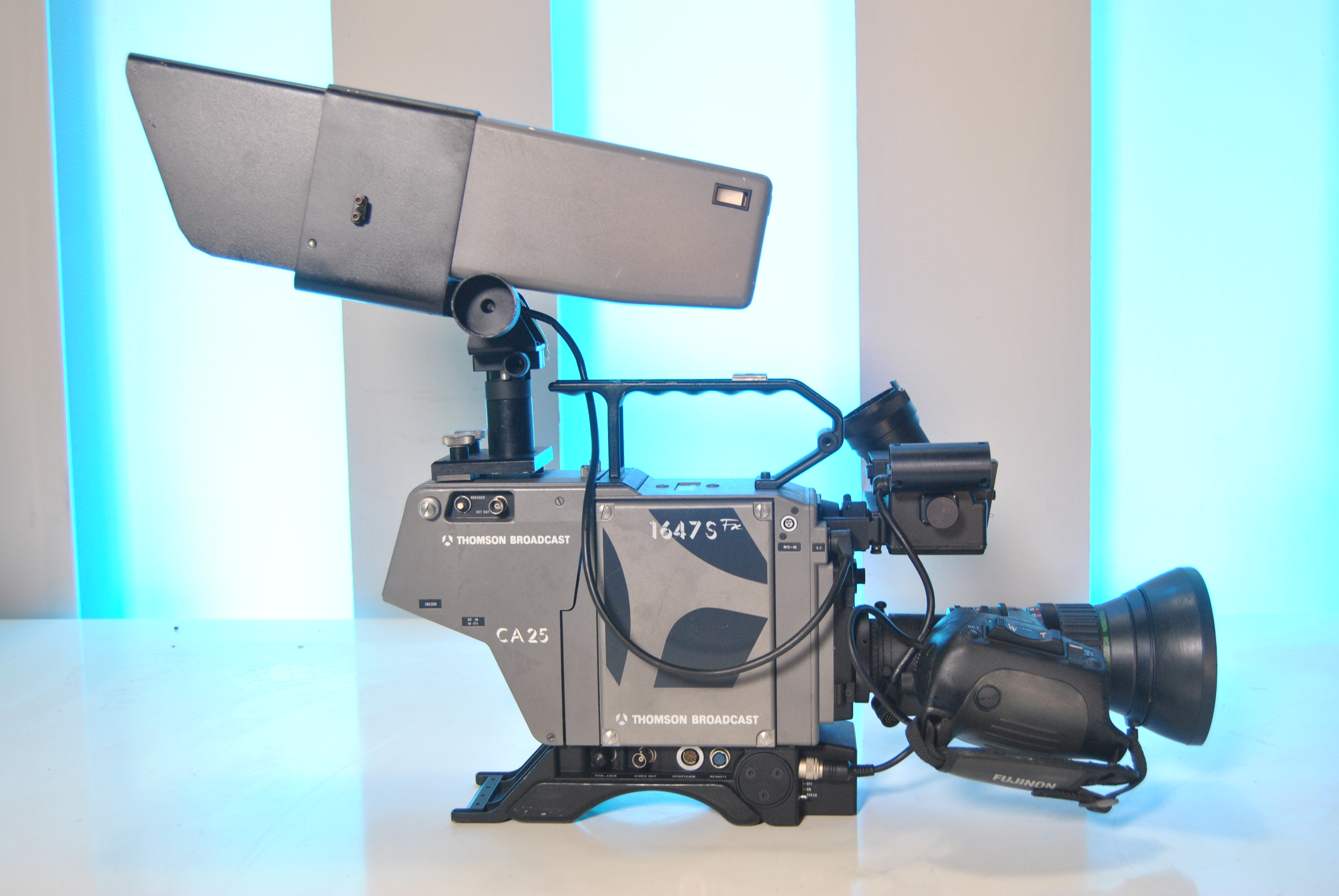
Refurbished Thomson TTV 1647 camera. The camera (and its CCU) was used by New Channel and then acquired by Tempo, who did not use it because its technology was now obsolete. Thomson TTV 1647 was a successful camera model of the 90's used by many channels worldwide.

The channel due to debts, has been out of business for many years, is pledged to systematic banks, and it remains unknown what happened to the station as a whole (film library, copyright, equipment, etc.), while in all probability will have been destroyed, as at the time it aired, the internet was not yet widespread, and many of its programs (if they survive), are recorded on video tapes.

However, some of the channel's equipment was found in an abandoned warehouse (cameras, video mixers, transmitters, etc.) with the Hellenic Broadcast Culture Center in Chalcis undertaking their reconstruction and restarting. To the same museum, Kopanitsas donated the equipment of the Social Business Channel owned by him, a channel that occupied the 22 UHF frequency from Hymettus, two years after the closure of Tempo (where he participated as a shareholder and general manager during its last period of operation).
