= Holidays in Greece TV =

Defunct Greek television channel

Holidays in Greece television logo.

Holidays in Greece TV was a Greek satellite network, launched in April 2004 and operated by Electrodiastimiki S.A., focusing on travel and tourism. Its aim is to promote the Greek tourism industry, which is one of the main industries in Greece along with shipping.

Holidays in Greece TV is the first FTA satellite channel launched in Greece. It was available on Hotbird 6 and Hellas Sat 2 which cover all of Europe and parts of Africa and Asia, as well as to Australia and North America on other satellites. It was also available online through JumpTV, a subscription-based service. Various local TV channels all around Greece broadcast parts of the programming from Holidays in Greece TV, including Crete, Messinia, Korinthos, Rhodes, Kefalonia, Serres, and Drama. In addition, the channel was available on local cable in Skiathos, Skopelos, Ios, Fthiotida, and Arahova.

The channel reportedly ceased transmission in 2006, when it left Eutelsat 33D.

== Programming ==
Programming included documentaries and programmes covering specific topics such as nightlife and dining. The network provides information about cultural hotspots such as caves, monasteries, museums, traditional villages and ancient sites. Holidays in Greece TV also delivers a daily tourist news program providing up to date information from all around the country.

Specific programs include:

- Aroma Elladas - Daily lifestyle program.
- Discovering Greece - Documentary program showcasing tourist destinations in Greece.
- Η Gh Tis Eυforias - Agricultural news and information.
- Where to Stay - Program gives information on hotels, restaurants and bars for the specific area mentioned in the Discovering Greece episode that precedes the show.
