= Village Cinema =

- Country: Greece
- Headquarters: Greece

Programming
- Languages: Greek (only the advertisements); English (with Greek subtitles)
- Picture format: 16:9 (1080i, HDTV)

Ownership
- Owner: Antenna Group
- Sister channels: ANT1; Magenta Cinema

History
- Launched: June 11, 2012

Links
- Website: Village Cinema

Village Cinema is a Greek subscription movie television network. It started operation on June 11, 2012, broadcasting exclusively on Magenta TV. Initially, it belonged to the Demco Group, and from November 2022 to the Antenna Group.

The television channel specializes in programming centered on the film industry and the creative process of movie production. The channel commenced its transmission with the screening of the film Buried, which marked its debut on Greek television.

== See also ==
- Village Cinemas
- Village Roadshow
- OTE
