= Greek Cinema (TV channel) =

- Country: Greece
- Broadcast area: North America; South America; Asia-Pacific; Australia; New Zealand; UK; Ireland; Central Europe; Cyprus; CIS; Middle East; Africa

Ownership
- Owner: Attica Media Group

History
- Launched: September 26, 2012

Links
- Website: Greek Cinema

Greek Cinema is a Greek language film channel that airs the best classic and contemporary films from Greece. It is the first 24-hour film channel in the world dedicated to Greek cinema. It is owned and operated by Attica Media Group, a media conglomerate in Greece that specializes in magazine publishing as well as TV & radio broadcasting.

Greek Cinema channel airs an eclectic array of films, spanning all time periods from the golden age of Greek cinema (the 1950s and 1960s) to more contemporary fare from the 1970s-1990s. It also airs films from a wide variety of genres including comedies, dramas, romance, crime, adventure as well as historical films. Greek Cinema airs films from the top film studios in Greece including Finos Film, Karayiannis-Karatzopoulos and Papandreou Productions.

== Availability ==
Greek Cinema originally launched on 16 January 2012 in Greece via a partnership with OTE TV, a Greek pay-TV operator that offers Satellite television and IPTV services. OTE TV launched ΟΤΕ ΣΙΝΕΜΑ, the first ever Greek cinema channel via a programming alliance with Greek Cinema channel.

On 26 September 2012, Greek Cinema channel expanded internationally, launching on Dish Network in the United States. It subsequently launched in Canada in 2013, via a partnership with Odyssey TV and in Australia on the MySat platform.

On 3 May 2014, it was announced that Attica Media Group had signed a distribution agreement with Mesimvria Enterprises Ltd. in Cyprus to launch Greek Cinema channel in Cyprus. The channel subsequently launched on CytaVision on June 16, 2014.
