= MEGA Cosmos (Canada) =

Mega Cosmos
- Country: Canada
- Broadcast area: National
- Network: Mega Channel
- Headquarters: Toronto, Ontario

Programming
- Language: Greek
- Picture format: 1080i (HDTV)

Ownership
- Owner: Odyssey Television Network
- Sister channels: ERT World; Odyssey

History
- Launched: 28 June 2012

Links
- Website: odysseytv.ca

MEGA Cosmos is a Canadian exempt Category B Greek language specialty channel owned by Odyssey Television Network. It features Greek content with different commercials and scheduling compared to the original channel MEGA Channel, which is the largest private TV channel in Greece.

MEGA Cosmos broadcasts programming primarily from the library of the homonymous pan-hellenic channel. Programming includes news, television dramas, game shows and more.

== History ==
=== Prior developments ===
Odyssey Television Network owned most of the rights to MEGA Channel programming in Canada from 2001 to 2003; this programming aired on the then-named Odyssey II channel. The agreement expired in 2003; subsequently, the channel was then renamed ERT Sat (now known as ERT World) as Odyssey reached an agreement with the parent Greek public broadcaster.

In 2007, Ethnic Channels Group licensed the MEGA Cosmos brand and programming from MEGA Cosmos' parent owners in Greece. The channel launched on Rogers Cable on 15 October.

=== Current channel ===
On 12 August 2011, Greek National Television Network (Canada) Inc., a subsidiary of Odyssey Television Network, was granted approval from the Canadian Radio-television and Telecommunications Commission (CRTC) to launch a television channel called OTN 3, described as "a national, general interest, third-language, ethnic speciality Category B service devoted to the Greek-speaking community in Canada."

In June 2012, Odyssey Television Network acquired the MEGA Cosmos rights and subsequently launched its own version of the channel on 28 June 2012, using the OTN 3 licence. The Ethnic Channels Group version of MEGA Cosmos ceased broadcasting the same day; its license was revoked by the CRTC in October 2012.

On September 14, 2018, the CRTC approved Odyssey Television Network's request to convert MEGA Cosmos (OTN3) from a licensed Category B speciality service to an exempted third language service.

In October 2022, MEGA Cosmos re-launched in Canada, becoming available via Bell Satellite TV, Bell Fibe TV and Rogers Cable.

== Notable shows ==
A list of notable shows that air on MEGA Cosmos, as of June 2025:

- Koinonia Ora Mega – morning show, airs Monday – Friday
- Exo Paidia – comedy, airs Saturday & Sunday
- I Gi Tis Elias – drama, airs Monday - Friday
- Live News – famous afternoon news magazine with Nikos Evaggelatos
- MEGA Gegonota – nightly newscast
- Mega Kalimera – infotainment show, airs Monday – Friday
- The Chase– afternoon game show with Maria Mpekatorou
