= MAD TV (TV channel) =

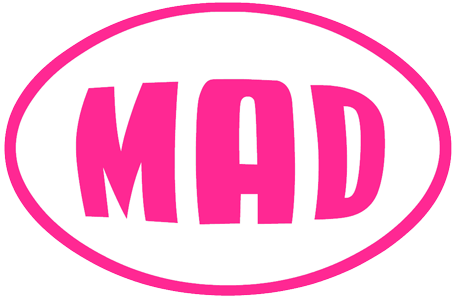
- Country: Greece
- Broadcast area: Attica, Argosaronikos, central & southern Evia, northwestern Cyclades, Kythira, Boeotia and parts of Peloponnese
- Headquarters: Pallini, Attica

Programming
- Language: Greek
- Picture format: 4K (downscaled to 1080i / 16:9 576i for the SDTV feed)

Ownership
- Owner: Solar Media S.A.
- Sister channels: MAD Greekz, MAD Viral, MAD World, MAD Rewind, MAD Vibes

History
- Launched: June 6, 1996

Links
- Website: MAD

Availability

Terrestrial
- Digea: Channel 34 (Ymittos, Parnitha, Aegina, Oktonia, Prasino, Chalcis, Avlonas, Vari, Nea Stira, Laurium, Anavyssos, Sounion, Nea Makri, Darditsa)

MAD TV (also known as MAD) is a Greek television network that broadcasts music related programming including video clips, music news, and interviews as well as concert footage. It was the first music station in Greece, launched on June 6, 1996, and was founded by Andreas Kouris. The channel is owned by Solar Media S.A. and is based in Pallini, Attica.

== History ==
In May 2000, MAD TV launched the first Greek music portal, which provides its users with the most up to date worldwide music information along with brand new Internet services.

MAD TV also offers a wide range of Retail and B2B services to the public: Go MAD (interactive service) and MAD Music (5 music-interactive audio channels) available on Nova (DTH satellite platform in Greece), MAD Shop (online CD shop) through their website, Nova and i-mode mobile telephony, MAD Scanner (mobile service for acoustic fingerprint) through Vodafone Greece, Real-time video streaming of MAD TV’s program for 2G and 3G mobile phones, mobile content (ring-tones, logos and MMS) to all the top mobile telephony companies in Greece, music content to internet sites and portals (news, events, artists’ CVs, charts, photos and wallpapers, audio and video streaming, polyphonic audio ring-tones, etc.), and many more.

Since June 26, 2004, MAD TV organizes each year the MAD Video Music Awards, a unique Greek music production and awards ceremony, which allows the public to vote for their favorite artists and video clip. On May 26 and 27 of 2005, MAD TV held the 1st conference for the music industry in Greece, Athens Music Forum, which focuses on bringing together representatives from all professional fields that are directly and indirectly related to the music industry. MAD TV also organizes "Secret Concerts", which are a series of famous artist’s live appearances in front of a small audience in a private and secret place, which gives the opportunity to artists to present a special performance with a different repertoire.

From 2013 and onwards, MAD produced the Greek selection to the Eurovision Song Contest, called Eurosong – A MAD Show.

MAD TV’s target group ranges from 15 to 24 years old. 90% of its daily program includes all the latest pop, electronic, rock, hip hop, rhythm and blues releases and 30 live shows per week. All shows deal with different subjects, ranging from worldwide music news, artist news, Internet, video games, cinema, clubbing, concerts, interviews and documentaries, concerning the majority of the Greek and International artist community.

== Programs ==
- OK!
- Loca Report
- Cooler Lists
- Insta News
- 30 Best Videos
- All Hits Non-Stop
- All New Mixer
- Breakfast
- Mixer
- Zone M

== MAD World and Blue ==
In December 2005, MAD established, in cooperation with UBI World TV, the first international Greek music channel MAD World which targets Greeks abroad. MAD World is on air 24 hours a day, broadcasting all genres of Greek Music with special daily shows, rockumentaries dedicated to famous Greek artists, and special shows that keep the audience informed about the events that take place in Greece. In July 2006, MAD partnered up with ANT1 to launch Blue, a channel similar to MAD World but available only to audiences in North America. The channel was available with select international packages from satellite providers Dish Network in North America. However, Blue was not available from any North American cable television providers.

== MADWalk – The Fashion Music Project ==
MadWalk is a project by MAD TV that Famous and newcomers Greek fashion designers coexist with the greatest Greek performers in a unique event that combines dynamic Live Performances with subversive Fashion Shows.

Mistresses of the first Fashion Music Project, in 2011, was the fashion icons Vicky Kaya and Tamta. For the second year, Mad TV decided that the MAD presenter Mairi Synatsaki would be ideal for the Fashion Music Project, so Vicky Kaya and herself presented the event together for the two following years (2012-2013). In 2014, Mairi Synatsaki was the hostess for the show by herself.

== See also ==
- MAD Greekz
- MAD World
- Music of Greece
