= Greek Business Channel =

Greek Business Channel logo.

Greek Business Channel or GBC was the first network in Greece devoted exclusively to business and finance. It provided up to the minute details on all the happenings from Greece, Europe and abroad. Programming aimed to deliver news and information that will appeal to all people including homeowners, consumers, businessmen and women, and investors. GBC was the first thematic channel launched in Greece, it is available via satellite on Nova. It was launched in April 2002, and for unknown reasons, GBC ceased operations as of December 1, 2006.

== Schedule ==
It would first operate from 7 am till 5 pm and on weekends from 7 am till 3 pm Starting September 7, it would operate from 6 am till 8 pm and on weekends from 6 am till 5 pm.
