= Odyssey (TV channel) =

Canadian Greek-language TV channel

- Logo
- Country: Canada
- Broadcast area: National
- Headquarters: Toronto, Ontario

Programming
- Picture format: 480i (SDTV)

Ownership
- Owner: Odyssey Television Network
- Sister channels: ERT World; MEGA Cosmos

History
- Launched: December 1998

Links
- Website: Odyssey

Odyssey (also known as OTN1) is a Canadian Greek language Category A specialty channel and is owned by Odyssey Television Network. It features programming from ANT1 Satellite, a private network from Greece as well as local Canadian content produced by Odyssey and other independent companies.

Programming on Odyssey consists of news, sports, Greek serials (comedies & dramas), reality programs and more.

== History ==
OTN1 was licensed as Odyssey on 4 September 1996 by the Canadian Radio-television and Telecommunications Commission (CRTC) as a regional ethnic specialty channel for the province of Ontario. On 6 June 1997, before the channel launched, the CRTC amended its licence to allow it to be distributed nationally. In December 1998 Odyssey Television was launched on Rogers Cable and Shaw Direct.

== Notable shows ==
A list of notable shows that air on Odyssey, as of June 2025:

- ANT1 News – nightly newscast
- Kalimera Ellada – morning current affairs show, airs Monday – Friday
- Radio Arvila – satire
- Rouk Zouk – game show, airs weekday afternoons
- The 2night Show - late night talk show, airs Friday & Saturday
- To Proino – morning entertainment magazine, airs Monday - Friday
- Who Wants to Be A Millionaire? – game show, airs Saturday & Sunday
- Greek Super League – Live Super League matches
