= MAD World =

International television channel

- Country: Greece
- Broadcast area: Worldwide

Ownership
- Owner: Solar Media S.A.
- Sister channels: MAD

History
- Launched: November 2005

MAD World is the international television service of MAD TV that broadcasts the 'best of MAD' programming to Greeks abroad. Unlike its counterpart in Greece, MAD World airs only Greek music content, no international music.

Mad World is on the air 24 hours a day, broadcasting all genres of Greek music (pop, hip hop, rock, etc.), 'rockumentaries' dedicated to famous Greek artists, and daily live shows that keep the audience informed about the events that take place in Greece. Mad World also focuses on the classic Greek hits of the last decade that are very popular among the Greeks worldwide.

== Mission ==
Mad TV's production team is behind all the creative new formulas of Mad World and its ultimate goal is to make it the best satellite music channel. Mad TV wishes to spread Greek music all over the world through Mad World. What is more, it truly hopes to bring together Greek emigrants by informing their audience about current music events that take place in Greece, and/or the live appearances of the Greek artists abroad, thus benefiting both the Greek artists/singers and Greek songwriters.

== Availability ==
It launched in December 2005 in Asia, Africa and Australia on UBI World TV and launched in New Zealand in 2008 when UBI World TV expanded their services to New Zealand. In June 2012, UBI World TV ceased operations, resulting in MAD World going off the air as UBI was the only provider (at the time) offering the channel anywhere in the world.

In December 2013, Mad World re-launched on Bell Fibe TV in Canada via a partnership with Canadian ethnic broadcaster Ethnic Channels Group.

== Programs ==
Mad World features programs that are tailored specifically for the station:

- MAD Video Requests is a show that lets viewers request their favourite music video via email and SMS.
- MAD TOP 10 - The Top 10 Music videos from Greece.
- MAD News has the latest music news on the hour.
- POP World - Pop music and popular music videos.
- 3 apo 1 - three video clips from the same artist.
- Κlassika - Classic hits from that last 20 years.
- Jukebox - Viewers select their favourite from among two video clips.
- Mad4Bouzoukia - Live performances.
- Μousiko Κouti - All the latest news from the world of music and showbiz.
- Polu Dunata - All the latest Greek pop hits.
- Rythmos Εllinikos - Non-stop music mix of the latest hits from Greece.
- Τa Εrotika - Ballads from the world of pop, rock, techno and modern Greek music.
- Τop 5 has Five of the biggest hits from a specific artist, interspersed with interviews.
- Trash Me - Late night segment with a logo of a dog, an innuendo for the derogatory Skiladiko (Dog music) genre, which features lower budget "trash" clips that did not traditionally enjoy much broadcasting. Also includes songs that established a cult following in the nightlife.
