= Anavryti, Laconia =

Anavryti Αναβρυτή
- Community
- Photograph of the village's clock tower

- Location within Greece
- Coordinates: 37°2′N 22°22′E
- Country: Greece
- Administrative region: Peloponnese
- Regional unit: Laconia
- Municipality: Sparti
- Municipal unit: Mystras
- Elevation: 850 m (2,790 ft)

Population (2021)
  - Community: 49
- Time zone: UTC+2 (EET)
  - Summer (DST): UTC+3 (EEST)
- Area code: 27310

Anavryti or Anavriti (Αναβρυτή) is a small village in Laconia, Greece on Taygetus mountain, altitude 850m. Above the Evrotas Valley, Anavryti is traversed by European walking route E4. It is part of the municipal unit of Mystras.

The road to Anavryti was built in the 1950s by the men who gave their time and labor for the immense project. Donations sent by the Anavryti Hometown society in Astoria, Queens, New York helped pay for road. Until that time, the village could only be accessed on foot or by donkey. In the 1980s the road was paved with donations from the Society.

During World War II Nazi occupation, forces made the steep climb up to the village to destroy the houses of suspected partisans.

Over the years the village has been established as an eco-tourism destination. The many walking paths combined with its landscape makes the area popular with photographer. The village has a simple hotel and restaurants.

In Anavryti's Geological Museum, a variety of elements and pictures related to the fauna and flora of the village and its surroundings are exhibited. There is also an exhibit about Mount Taygetus.

There is a tradition that when the Jewish community of Mystras was expelled by the Venetians, they sought refuge in Anavryti and were the ancestors of some of today's inhabitants.

== Notable people from Anavryti ==
- Peter Karter
