= Nickelodeon Plus =

- Country: Greece
- Broadcast area: Central Macedonia
- Headquarters: Thessaloniki, Greece

Programming
- Language: Greek
- Picture format: 1080i HDTV

Ownership
- Owner: Pertho Radio TV Enterprises S.M.S.A. (Under license from Paramount)
- Sister channels: Nickelodeon

History
- Launched: November 28, 1995; 30 years ago
- Closed: December 31, 2025; 5 months ago
- Former names: MTV Plus (2009-2011)

Availability

Terrestrial
- Digea: 46 UHF (Cholomon); 48 UHF (Aridaia, Chortiatis, Mouries, Philippion)

Nickelodeon Plus was a Greek free-to-air television channel in Thessaloniki.

On 18 October 2009, it was launched as MTV Plus and by the end of 2011 was renamed to Nickelodeon Plus.

Both this channel and the main Nickelodeon service were discontinued on December 31, 2025.
