= Nickelodeon (Greek TV channel) =

Defunct Greek television channel (2010–2025)

Nickelodeon Greece
- Country: Greece; Cyprus
- Broadcast area: Attica, Argosaronikos, central & southern Evia, northwestern Cyclades, Kythira, Boeotia and parts of Peloponnese; Nationwide (cable and satellite)
- Headquarters: Nea Ionia, Attica, Greece

Programming
- Languages: Greek; English (with Greek subtitles)
- Picture format: 1080i HDTV (downscaled to 16:9 576i for the SDTV feed)

Ownership
- Owner: Tilekinisi (Local TV) S.M.S.A. (under license from Paramount)
- Sister channels: Nickelodeon Plus; Patra TV

History
- Launched: 1995; 31 years ago (Local TV); 3 September 2010; 16 years ago (Nickelodeon)
- Closed: 3 September 2010; 16 years ago (Local TV); 31 December 2025; 10 months ago
- Replaced by: Keedoo
- Former names: Local TV (1995-2005, 2009-2010); SBC (2005-2009)

Links
- Website: Official Nickelodeon Greece website at the Wayback Machine (archived 5 January 2026)

Availability

Terrestrial
- Digea: Channel 34 (Ymittos, Parnitha, Aegina, Oktonia, Prasino, Chalcis, Avlonas, Vari, Nea Stira, Lavrio, Anavyssos, Sounion, Nea Makri, Darditsa)

Nickelodeon was a private free-to-air children's and youth entertainment television channel of regional scope that broadcasts in Attica, Argo-Saronic Gulf and Euboea, and by satellite in the rest of Greece through Nova and Cosmote TV, based in Nea Ionia, Attica and launched on 3 September 2010.

== History ==
The channel started in mid-1995, initially as Local TV with a news nature and emphasis on society, sports and education. It broadcast news bulletins with topics from all the municipalities of Attica, municipal councils and informative broadcasts.

In December 2005 it was replaced by the Social Business Channel enriching its news program with financial broadcasts for the stock market. On 9 May 2006, Telekinisi (Local TV) S.A. had signed a contract with Video and Computer Applications S.A. (now SBC TV S.A.) to outsource the production of the station's program, which exceeded 30% of the monthly running time, which is prohibited by law.

Since the beginning of SBC, it has been illegally broadcasting from its analogue frequencies 22 UHF (from Ymittos) and 50 UHF (from Aegina), which had been granted to ERT to broadcast the Parliament channel. On 15 June 2010, its operation was suspended, as only its broadcast by Ymittos was officially deemed illegal by NCRTV and EETT.

At that time it changed ownership and on 12 July the channel returned to its old frequencies (35 and 49 UHF) under its old name, as Local TV with a change of style, rebroadcasting Nickelodeon's programs on a trial basis. On 3 September, it got its current name.

Some of the series that the station has aired have previously been broadcast by Alpha TV, its sister stations, Alpha Kids (from the subscription platform of the TV channel of the same name) and TV Cosmopolis (now One Channel) and sister network Polis NET, from 2001 until 2007, when the Nickelodeon series became more widely known, as well as from Alter Channel and Star Channel.

The Nickelodeon brand license would expire on 31 December 2025, with Tilekinisi choosing not to renew it, as it was likely Paramount Skydance would not continue to license the channel due to the decline of pay television worldwide, along with the shutdown of non-essential channels to the company, including licensed networks it did not own. Tilekinisi shut down sister channel Nickelodeon Plus at the end of that day, with Keedoo, a new children's network with local and pan-Euro content, debuting on Nickelodeon's former channel space the next day.
