= Alter Channel =

Defunct TV channel in Greece

- Country: Greece

Programming
- Language: Greek
- Picture format: 4:3 (576i, SDTV)

Ownership
- Owner: Eleutheri Tileorasi S.A.

History
- Launched: 1990
- Closed: 26 January 2012 (NOVA); 10 February 2012 (analog & digital); 26 April 2012 (the station was still operating); November 2012 (OTE TV via Conn-X); 11 October 2013 (the building of ALTER Channel was sealed)
- Former names: Channel 29 (1990-1994); Channel 5 (1994-1999); Alter 5 (1999-2000)

Alter Channel, better known as Alter, was a private TV channel in Greece. It was launched in 1990 and owned by Eleftheri Tileorasi S.A. and was headed by Andreas Kouris. Alter's programming mainly consisted of news, current affairs shows and entertaining programs.

Alter featured news anchor Nikos Chatzinikolaou, morning show host Giorgos Aftias, and investigative reporter Makis Triantafyllopoulos. Additionally, Alter also aired the award-winning program Fos Sto Tounel, which tracked down missing individuals and solved various crimes. The show also featured a lineup of children's programming that aired daily. In early December 2011, Alter stopped broadcasting due to financial difficulties.

== History ==
- 1994 (March) – The station was launched as Channel 5.
- In a transitional period when it was co-owned by Altec and Kouris Media Group it was named Alter 5.
- 2000 – On 29 October of this year it rebranded its name as Alter Channel.
- 2002 (September) – Alter moves the news programming from 6 pm Balkan-Nile (UTC+02:00) to an hour and twenty minutes later to compete with other channels such as ANT1 news.
- 2005 – On April 20, Alter overhauled its lineup and organised its schedule into blocks: morning, noon, afternoon and night. The morning block featured news and current affairs, as well as programming for children. The noon block had current affairs and entertainment shows. During the evening Alter broadcast serials and the main nightly newscast. At night, programming consisted mainly of entertainment and talk shows.
- 2005 – Alter launches Alter Globe, serving North America (24 Aug.) on Dish Network, and Australia, Asia and Africa (December) on UBI World TV.
- 2007 – Alter Globe was removed from the Dish Network platform in the US on August 31, 2007, and debuted on the rival platform DirecTV on September 26, 2007.
- 2008 – Alter Globe launches in New Zealand via UBI World TV.
- 2010 – Alter Globe is added to Cablevision in the US then removed a short while later due to insufficient growth.
- 2011 (November) – Alter headquarters was occupied by its workers, who were striking in response to not having been paid in over a year.
- 2011 (December) – The channel stopped broadcasting.
- 2012 (April) – Plans to reopen the channel began, with finance believed to be by Israeli, French and Turkish investors.

== Alter Channel workers' occupation (30 November 2011 – 10 February 2012) ==
Alter Channel workers' occupation
- Date: 30 November 2011 – 11 October 2013
- Location: Greece
- Caused by: Unpaid for over a year Channel debt crisis
- Goals: Salary payment
- Methods: Occupation
- Result: Management victory End of the channel broadcast

Parties
Unpaid Alter employees	Station management

Lead figures
George Filippakis	George Kouris

On November 11, 2011, unpaid Alter employees occupied the station, broadcasting their demands over the transmission. Alter employees produced and transmitted their own program from January 1 until February 10, 2012, at which point all transmissions ceased.

The programme featured interviews with unemployed Greeks, unpaid workers, striking workers of the Greek steel industry, unpaid employees of newspaper Eleftherotypia, economist Dimitris Kazakis (who referred to the imposition of new measures by the government Papademos), the chairman of power company union GENOP, Nikos Fotopoulos, and former broadcast journalist John Kanelakis. Presenters of the show were George Filippakis and Akrivi Kirikos.

Also broadcast at this time were the documentaries Debtocracy, and W4 Crisis (Women of the crisis), which referred to the economic crisis and the Greek debt. The solidarity concert at the indoor basketball court of Peristeri was also broadcast on Monday, January 30, 2012. In April 2012, the major shareholder of ALTER George Kouris started negotiations with Israeli investors, who wanted to financially support the channel.

== Logo ==
The original logo used by Alter Channel, which lasted for just one year, featured a swirl type symbol in red at the top and the words 'Alter Channel' below in blue. The channel simply used the word 'Alter' as its logo.

== Programming ==
Alter shows include:

- Alter Εidiseis (Alter News) – Daily national and international newscast. Hosted by Nikos Chatzinikolaou.
- Atheatos Kosmos (Out-of-sight world) – Current affairs program, discusses social and political issues. Hosted by Kostas Chardavellas.
- Edo Kai Tora (Here and Now) – Current affairs program. Features live reports and analysis of issues such as economic matters and health concerns. Hosted by Μaria Smilidou and Dimitris Freskos.
- Fos Sto Tounel – Informative series that focuses on finding missing persons. It has won numerous awards. Hosted by Ageliki Nikolouli.
- Kalimera (Good Morning) – Morning show, features a discussion with in-studio guests and news from Greece and abroad. Hosted by Giorgos Aftias (previously at Alpha TV).
- Lifestyle, a one-hour show with star interviews, entertainment news, and gossip about Greek show business.
- Poly Bla Bla (Much talking) – A show targeted at youth with topics including celebrity gossip, fashion tips, games and contests, strange news stories from around the world and helpful advice for viewers. Hosted by Stamatina Tsimtsili, with Alexandra Tsolka, Nikos Partsolis, Olga Lafazani, Vasilis Tsatsanis and Stefanos Kostantinidis.
- Prosopo Me Prosopo (Face to face) – Talk show with focus on current affairs including political, social and economic issues; hosted by Nikos Chatzinikolaou.
- Ta Paratragouda (Incidents) – Entertainment series that features various guests who wish to air their problems (whether real or fake). Hosted by Annita Pania.
- Simera (Today) – Discusses daily news and analyses current events in Greece. Hosted by Akis Paulopoulos.
- TV Weekend – Entertainment series that features celebrity gossip and entertainment news. Hosted by Eleni Fotopoulou.
- Zougla and Kitrinos Typos (Yellow Press) – Current affairs. Hosted by Makis Triantafyllopoulos.
- Kids programs – In the morning, Alter was airing kid shows including Angelina Ballerina, Animal Stories, Bakugan Battle Brawlers, Barney & Friends, Bob the Builder, Code Lyoko, Finley the Fire Engine, Fireman Sam, Franklin, Gormiti, Koala Brothers, Legend of the Dragon, Make Way for Noddy, Miffy and Friends, Pingu, Postman Pat, Rupert, Strawberry Shortcake, Teenage Mutant Ninja Turtles, The Adventures of Marco & Gina, Thomas & Friends, Totally Spies!, Transformers: Robots in Disguise, The Adventures of Mary-Kate & Ashley, Triplets, Trotro, You're Invited to Mary-Kate & Ashley's... and Winx Club.

== Alter Globe ==
Alter Globe logo.

Alter Globe is the international network of Alter Channel that broadcasts Alter to audiences in North America and Australia. The channel launched in August 2005 in the USA on Dish Network and in December 2005 in Australia on UBI World TV. In September 2007 it switched platforms in the US from Dish Network to DirecTV. On April 1, 2011, was removed from the DirecTV platform along with all other Greek satellite television channels that were carried by the service. On October 1, 2011, Alter Globe re-launched in the US on the Home2US platform.

== See also ==
- List of programs broadcast by Alter Channel
- List of Greek-language television channels
