= List of programs broadcast by Alter Channel =

The following is a history of the programming that had aired on Alter Channel from Greece:

== Children, teens and young people ==
- 64 Zoo Lane
- The Adventures of Blinky Bill
- The Adventures of Mary-Kate & Ashley and You're Invited to Mary-Kate & Ashley's... (all under the title "Mary-Kate and Ashley")
- The All-New Dennis the Menace
- Alienators-Evolution Continues
- Angelina Ballerina
- The Angry Beavers
- Animal Stories
- Anne of Green Gables
- Aoki Densetsu Shoot!
- Archie's Weird Mysteries
- Arthur (Seasons 1-9)
- Babar
- Baby Triplets
- Bakugan
- Bananas in Pyjamas
- Barney & Friends
- Battle B Daman
- Becassine
- Benjamin the Elephant
- The Berenstain Bears (1985)
- The Berenstain Bears (2002)
- Beyblade
- Beyblade V-Force
- Bibi Blocksberg
- Billy and Buddy
- Bob the Builder
- Bratz
- Butt-Ugly Martians
- Caillou
- Captain Pugwash
- Care Bears
- Care Bears: Adventures in Care-a-lot
- Casper
- Cédric
- Charley and Mimmo
- Chiquititas
- Clifford the Big Red Dog
- Clifford's Puppy Days
- Code Lyoko
- Cotoons
- Digimon Adventure, Digimon Adventure 02, Digimon Frontier and Digimon Tamers (all under the title "Digimon")
- Donkey Kong Country
- Dream Street
- Duel Masters
- Engie Benjy
- The Fairytaler
- Fantaghiro
- Fantastic Four
- Fifi and the Flowertots
- Finley The Fire Engine
- Fireman Sam
- Fix & Foxi and Friends
- Flipper
- Football Stories
- Franklin
- Galactik Football
- Garfield and Friends
- George of the Jungle
- Gormiti
- Gundam Wing
- Hamtaro
- Harry and His Bucket Full of Dinosaurs
- HarveyToons Show
- He-Man and the Masters of the Universe
- Heidi, Girl of the Alps
- Hello Kitty and Friends
- Hey Arnold!
- Horseland
- Hot Wheels Battle Force 5
- Huntik
- Iznogoud
- Jacques Cousteau's Ocean Tales
- Kipper
- The Koala Brothers
- Kung Foot
- The New Adventures Of Spirou And Fantasio
- The Little Lulu Show (Seasons 1-2)
- Little Monsters
- Legend of The Dragon
- Little People
- Little Red Tractor
- Lucky Luke
- MacDonald's Farm
- Maggie and the Ferocious Beast
- The Magic Key
- Make Way For Noddy
- The Adventures Of Marco And Gina
- Marsupilami
- Martin Mystery
- Mary-Kate and Ashley in Action
- Maya the Bee
- Medabots
- Megaman NT Warrior
- Mew Mew Power
- Microscopic Milton
- Miffy
- Miss Spider's Sunny Patch Friends
- Mr. Men and Little Miss
- Magic Adventures of Mumfie
- Muppet Babies
- My Little Pony
- My Little Pony Tales
- The New Adventures of Lucky Luke
- The New Adventures of Ocean Girl
- Oggy and the Cockroaches
- One Piece
- Papa Beaver's Storytime
- Papyrus
- Peter Pan
- Pimpa
- Pingu
- Pippi Longstocking
- Polochon
- Postman Pat
- Potato Head Kids
- Power Rangers Ninja Storm
- Princess Sissi
- Rainbow Fish
- Roary the Racing Car
- Rocket Power
- Rolie Polie Olie
- Rubbadubbers
- Rupert and Rupert Bear, Follow the Magic...
- Sabrina: The Animated Series, Sabrina's Secret Life and Sabrina the Teenage Witch
- Sagwa, the Chinese Siamese Cat
- Sanbarbe le Pirate
- Sandokan
- The Adventures of Sidney Fox
- Silver Surfer
- Slam Dunk
- Speed Racer: The Next Generation
- Spider-Man: The Animated Series
- Strawberry Shortcake
- Sylvanian Families
- Tabaluga
- Team Galaxy
- Teenage Mutant Ninja Turtles
- Thomas the Tank Engine
- Timbuctoo
- The Adventures of Tintin
- The Hoobs
- The Spooktacular New Adventures of Casper
- The New Adventures of Madeline
- The Princess of Nile
- The Woody Woodpecker Show
- Titeuf
- Tom and Pippo
- Totally Spies
- Tractor Tom
- Transformers: Animated
- Transformers Armada
- Transformers Energon
- Transformers Cybertron
- The Triplets
- Troll Tales
- Trollz
- Trotro
- Valerian & Laureline
- Vicky the Viking
- Winx Club
- Wolverine and the X-Men
- Yakari
- Yolanda: Daughter of the Black Corsair

== Entertainment/serials ==
- Agpnies – A variety show with all sorts of entertainment from song, dance, theatre, beauty contests, magic shows, jugglers and any other weird thing that piques the curiosity of the viewers. Hosted by Annita Pania.(2002-2006)
- Je T'aime – hosted by Annita Pania (2006–2008)
- Kodikas Da Mitsi - A satirical sketch comedy show with comedian George Mitsikostas. Sketches poke fun at politicians and journalists, including a look at the current issues making headlines. (2006-2007)
- Lifestyle – A look at the magical world of Greek and international show biz. From events and personalities that dominate the headlines, exclusive videos, interviews with famous people and a look at all the latest trends. Hosted by Betty Maggira, airs Saturdays at 12:30 pm. (2003–2011)
- Μitsi Xosta - sketch comedy show with comedian George Mitsikostas (2001-2006)
- Number One – A look at the Greek music scene, with news and reports as well as exclusive interviews with all the hottest stars. Hosted by Artemis Kokkinara. (2005-2007)
- Proina Gossip – news about the entertainment world (2005)
- Stin Kouzina Me Tin Vefa - cooking show with celebrity chef Vefa Alexiadou (2006–2007)
- To Party Tis Zois Sou – An entertainment show featuring distinguished personalities from politics, the arts and show biz, who get together and celebrate, reminisce about old times, talk about their lives and experiences, and sing and dance. Hosted by Akis Paulopoulos. (2003-2009)
- Top Secret – An entertainment program that features lively guests, jokes and original games with many gifts, mixed in with music, dancing and an all around good time. Hosted by Dessu Kouvelogianni. (2004-2006)
- VIP – gossip news; hosted by Maria Siniori (2004–2005)

== Serials ==
- elies throumbes - sitcom (2004-2005)
- Giannaki omorfopaido - sitcom (2006)
- H gi tis evagelias - sitcom (cancelled before airing)
- Horevodas me tous zaralikous - sitcom (2004)
- I Limni Ton Stenagmon - drama (2005-2006)
- Koritsia... o Markoulis - sitcom (2005)
- Mexri 3 einai desmos - sitcom (2004-2005)
- Pame epitheorisi - sitcom (2005)
- Sovarotis Miden - sitcom (2003)
- xires club - sitcom (2004-2005)
- Zouga symmory - sitcom (2001)

== Foreign ==
=== Current series ===
- Eureka (2010) (2011 only reruns)
- Flash Gordon (2010) (2011 only reruns)
- Friday Night Lights (2010) (2011 only reruns)
- Heroes (Season 1 2007-2008) (Season 1 reruns 2008-2010) (Seasons 2-3 from July 2011)
- Karen Sisco (2010) (2011 only reruns)
- Lipstick Jungle (2009-2010) (2011 only reruns)
- Mad Men (2009-2010) (2011 only reruns)

=== Previously aired ===
- Andromeda (2002-2004)
- Angela Eyes (2006) (2009 only reruns)
- The Black Donnellys
- CSI (2003-2009)
- Esmeralda - Latin American telenovela (2006)
- Hercules: The Legendary Journeys (2006-2009)
- Largo Winch (2004-2006)
- Maria la del barrio (2006)
- Mister Sterling (2009)
- Nash Bridges (2002-2004)
- Raines (2009)
- Paulina (La Usurpadora) (2006)
- Sex and the City (2002-2008)
- Surface (2007-2008) (2009 only reruns)
- Xena: Warrior Princess (2006-2009)

== News/information ==
- Apotypomata - Investigative reports that delve into problems facing society today. Host Antonis Papadopoulos and his team of journalists analyse the issues and attempt to bring to light those things that others want to suppress. Airs Sundays at 11:30pm (2006–present)
- Αtheatos Kosmos - Informative talk show that tries to shed light on all the major issues affecting society, includes reports, testimonies and documentaries. Hosted by Kosta Xardavella. (2003–present)
- Auto Alter - all the news from the world of automobiles, with a look at the all the latest models, test drives, smart buying tips, accessories and more
- Documento - documentary series (2005)
- Η Foni Tou Politi - current affairs program that looks at all the issues that affect Greeks today
- Κathares Kouventes - Informative program that looks at news headlines, social issues and more. Hosted by Giorgo Varemeno and Magda Tsegkou; airs Monday - Friday at 10am. (2004-2006)
- Οi Pyles Tou Anexhgitou - Informative discussion that examines issues and events that remain unsolved, a look at the unexplained. With the help of leading scientists, researchers and specialized teams, the program sheds light on the travels of the soul, issues from the archives of science that were labelled as 'unexplained' and on messages from the past and the future. Hosted by Kostas Xardavellas. (?-2010)
- Olikh Epanafora - Weekly informative discussion about all the major issues from politics to social concerns; features various guests in studio. Hosted by Giannis Loverdos, airs weekly. (2005-2006)
- Sti Veranta - Late night talk show that features interviews with well-known social and artistic personalities. Hosted by Niko Mouratidis. (2006)
- Ta Leme Ola - Political affairs discussion with a panel of guests, features exclusive reports, analysis and a look at the news of the day. Hosted by Giannis Loverdos; airs Monday - Friday at 6:45am. (2006)
- Ta Mystika Tis Ygeis - a look at all the latest health news with Stefanos Karagiannopoulos (2001-2008)
- To Kleidi Tis Eutixias - Informative program that aims to help people overcome the problems they are facing in their lives and make their hopes and dreams come true. Through the help of private citizens, businesses and institutions, viewers overcome the obstacles and find solutions to their problems. Hosted by Kostas Xardavellas. (2006)
- ΤΡΩΩ Υgiena - A look at diet and health with dietician/nutritionist Mano Kazamia. He informs and gives advice about how to live a healthy lifestyle.
