= Alpha TV Cyprus =

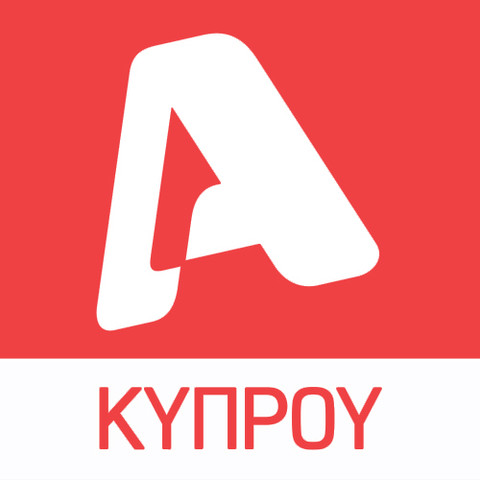
- Country: Cyprus
- Broadcast area: National
- Headquarters: Latsia, Nicosia, Cyprus

Programming
- Language: Greek
- Picture format: 16:9 (576i, SDTV)

Ownership
- Owner: Alpha Television Cyprus Ltd.
- Sister channels: Alpha TV

History
- Launched: 4 April 2016
- Former names: Alfa TV

Links
- Website: www.alphacyprus.com.cy

Availability

Terrestrial
- Nova: Channel 11
- Dish Network: Channel 10
- Cytavision by Cyta: Channel 7

Streaming media
- Alpha Cyprus: Alpha TV Live

Alpha Cyprus (Greek: Alpha Κύπρου) is a Cypriot Channel, created in 2015, a Sister-Channel of Alpha TV Greece, and operates its programs. The general manager is Petros Petrou. Alpha Cyprus is one of the highest-rated channels in Cyprus.

== History ==
On the 13th of October 2015, Alpha Cyprus was founded. Alpha Television Cyprus Limited was the owner of the Alpha TV company in Cyprus. A major shareholder of the company was the entrepreneur and owner of Alpha TV, the Greek TV station of the same name, Dimitris Kontominas. On the 9th of November 2015, Dimitris Kontominas filed with the Cyprus Broadcasting Authority to request permission to obtain a free Cyprus Broadcast. On the 27th of November 2015, Alpha TV got licensed to broadcast in Cyprus. On the 21st of March 2016, the official presentation of Alpha Cyprus took place at a press conference. The program of the station & the staff members of the new channel were presented. On the 4th April 2016, Alpha Cyprus began operation, having coverage in all of Cyprus. On the 11th of April 2018, all the shares of Alpha Cyprus were sold to the Papaellinas Group for €7 Million.

== Programming ==
=== Alpha Greece Programs ===
- Eleni - Variety/lifestyle show featuring entertainment as well as segments on cooking, health, astrology, lifestyle, youth issues. Hosted by a well-known Greek presenter Eleni Menegaki.
- Fos Sto Tounel - Informative series that focuses on finding missing persons. In its nineteenth season and hosted by Aggeliki Nikolouli; airs Fridays at 23:15.
- Spiti Mou, Spitaki Mou (Home Sweet Home) - Weekend morning show. Hosted by Konstantina Spyropoulou.
- 60' Ellada (60' Greece) - Documentary series traveling throughout Greece showcasing everyday life in different parts of the country. Hosted by Nikos Manesis and in its third season.
- 360° - Documentary series in its second season hosted by Sofia Papaioannou
- Pame Paketo (Idiom meaning "we are always together") - talk show. Hosted by Viki Xatzivasileiou.
- Min Arhizeis Ti Mourmoura (Do not start the grumbling) - family comedy series in its 6th season.
- To Soi Sou (Your Family) - comedy series in its 5th season, started in November 2014.
- Ela sti thesi mou (Come to my Place) - Comedy series.
- Tatouaz (Tattoo) - Drama series in its 2nd season.
- Deal or No Deal - hosted by Christos Ferentinos.

=== Alpha Cyprus Programs ===
- I Familia (The Family) - Cypriot TV Series which started its first season.
- Gineka Xoris Onoma (Woman Without Name) - Cypriot TV series on its 1st season.
- Me Agapi Cristiana (With Love Christiana) - Variety/lifestyle show featuring entertainment as well as segments on cooking, health, astrology, lifestyle, youth issues. Hosted by well-known Cypriot presenter Christiana Aristotelous.
- Louis Night Show - a satirical, comic show, in its 3rd season, hosted by a well-known Cypriot comedian Louis Patsalides.
- Alpha Proini Enimerosi (Alpha Morning News) - Weekend morning news program hosted by Konstantinos Konstantinou.
- Mple (Blue) - a new comedy show on its first season.
- DOSE VASI! (PAY ATTENTION!) - a comedy show based on Have You Been Paying Attention?.

== Slogans ==
- Τον Απρίλιο έρχομαι σπίτι σου (In April coming to your homes)
- Μαζί στον ALPHA Κύπρου (Together in Alpha Cyprus)
