= List of programs broadcast by Alpha TV =

This is a list of programs broadcast by Alpha TV (formerly Skai), including current and former programming as well as upcoming programming.

== Current programming ==
=== Comedy series ===
- Fonoi sto Kampanario (October 20, 2023 - present)
- Tromeroi Goneis (Autumn 2025 - present)
- To Soi Sou (Your Family) (Autumn 2025 - present)
- Dear Daddies (Autumn 2025 - present)

=== Drama series ===
- Code Name: Doctor (October 1, 2023 - present)
- Agios Erotas (September 25, 2024 - present)
- Na m' agapas (Autumn 2025 - present)
- Porto Leone: Sti Geitonia me ta kokkina fanaria (Autumn 2025 - present)
- To Spiti dipla sto potami (Autumn 2025 - present)
- Na me les mama (Autumn 2025 - present)

=== Reality series and game show ===
- Deal (October 3, 2016 - present)
- Oikogeneiakes Istories (2010 - present)

=== Daytime talk shows ===
- Happy Day with Stamatina Tsimtsili (March 17, 2014 - present)
- Weekend with Manesis (September 9, 2017 - present)
- As good as it gets with Natalia Germanou (September 15, 2018 - present)
- Kitchen Lab with Akis Petretzikis (November 10, 2018 - present)
- Super Katerina with Katerina Kainourgiou (September 13, 2021 - present)

=== News/documentary programming ===
- Alpha Central News with Antonis Sroiter (March 16, 2009 - present)
- Alpha Afternoon News
- Autopsy with Antonis Sroiter (April 18, 2012 - present)
- Protagonists with Stavros Thodorakis (October 28, 2021 - present)

== Formerly broadcast by Alpha TV ==
=== Soap operas ===
Title	Premiere date	Finale	Notes	Seasons
On my shoes	October 3, 2016	July 9, 2021		5
The Ladies' Paradise	September 19, 2022	June 24, 2024		2

=== Comedy ===
Title	Premiere date	Finale	Seasons	Episodes	Notes
Don't play with Margaret	October 4, 1999	March 2000	1	16	
Velvet from silk	September 24, 2004	July 1, 2005	1	31	
Honest Cuckolds	October 2, 2006	June 25, 2007	1	32	
The Shots	September 24, 2007	June 26, 2008	1	26	
Perfect Creatures	September 25, 2007	July 1, 2008	1	26	
Veta Queen	October 6, 2008	December 15, 2008	1	10	
My angel, my devil	October 18, 2008	December 6, 2008	1	8	
Your Family	October 23, 2014	June 25, 2019	5	307	
Don't bother me	October 20, 2015	November 3, 2015	1	3	The series was cancelled suddenly
Asteras Rachoulas Team	October 24, 2016	June 26, 2017	1	28	
A Very Different Story	May 5, 2017	October 28, 2017	1	17	
The red wedding dress	October 5, 2017	December 14, 2017	1	10	
Home Is	September 30, 2019	March 13, 2020	1	38 (+8 unaired)	The series was cancelled suddenly
Can you keep a secret?	October 3, 2019	February 21, 2020	1	18	
Mum, let us alone!	September 13, 2021	June 29, 2022	1	125	
The Neoclassicals	March 4, 2022	May 20, 2023	1	7	
Murders in the belfry	October 20, 2023	December 23, 2023	1	12	
Don't start moaning	October 7, 2013	July 14, 2024	11	792	

=== Serials ===
- 504 chiliometra voria tis Athinas (504 χιλιόμετρα βόρεια της Αθήνας) - romance
- Afti I Nixta Menei (Αυτή η Νύχτα Μένει) - drama
- Ach! kai na'xeres (Αχ! και να 'ξερες) - comedy
- Akrovatondas (Ακροβατώντας) - drama
- Alithinoi erotes (Αληθινοί έρωτες) - drama
- Amore mio - comedy
- An m' agapas (Αν μ' αγαπάς) - drama
- Archipelagos (Αρχιπέλαγος) - drama
- Berdemata (Μπερδέματα) - comedy
- Chorevodas sti siopi (Χορεύοντας στη σιωπή) - drama
- Dekati entoli (10η εντολή) - crime drama
- Eho ena mystiko (Έχω ένα μυστικό) - drama
- Erasitechnis anthropos (Ερασιτέχνης άνθρωπος) - comedy
- Erotas me epidotisi O.G.A. (Έρωτας με επιδότηση Ο.Γ.Α.) - comedy
- Exafanisi (Εξαφάνιση) - drama
- G4 (Γ4) - teen drama
- Gia panta files (Για πάντα φίλες) - comedy
- Gia tin kardia enos angelou (Για την καρδιά ενός αγγέλου) - drama
- Η adelfi tis adelfis tis adelfis mou (H αδελφή της αδελφής της αδελφής μου) - drama
- Iparhoun andres kai andres (Υπάρχουν άντρες και άντρες) - comedy
- Istoria agapis (Ιστορία αγάπης) - romance
- Istories tou astinomou Beka (Ιστορίες του αστυνόμου Μπέκα) - mystery, drama with Ieroklis Michaelidis
- Kala na pathis (Καλά να πάθεις) - comedy
- Kinoumeni ammos (Κινούμενη άμμος) - drama
- Kato apo tin Akropoli (Κάτω από την Ακρόπολη) - drama
- Matomena homata (Ματωμένα χώματα) - drama
- Me diafora stithous (Με διαφορά στήθους) - comedy
- Meine dipla mou (Μείνε δίπλα μου) - drama
- Mi masas to paramithi (Μη μασάς το παραμύθι) - drama
- Mou lipeis (Μου λείπεις) - Drama, romance
- Mou to kratas maniatiko (Μου το κρατάς μανιάτικο) - comedy
- Mystikes diadromes (Μυστικές διαδρομές) - drama
- Odos Paradisou 7 (Οδός Παραδείσου 7) - comedy
- Oi atromitoi (Οι ατρόμητοι) - comedy
- Patra - Venetia (Πάτρα - Βενετία) - comedy
- Pira kokkina gyalia (Πήρα κόκκινα γυαλιά) - comedy
- Protoselidos belas (Πρωτοσέλιδος μπελάς) - comedy
- Sto dromo tis kardias (Στο δρόμο της καρδιάς) - romance
- Telefteos paradisos (Τελευταίος παράδεισος) - romance
- Tha se do sto plio (Θα σε δω στο πλοίο) - comedy
- To deka (Το δέκα) - comedy
- Zoi xana (Ζωή ξανά) - comedy
- San Oikogeneia (Σαν Οικογένεια) - drama, romance
- To Tatouaz (Το τατουάζ) - drama, romance, thriller
- Aggeliki (Αγγελική) - drama
- Sasmos (Σασμός) - drama
- To Proxenio tis Ioulias (Το Προξενιό της Ιουλίας) - drama
- Doubts (September 5, 2022 - June 26, 2024)

== Children's ==
- Beverly Hills Teens
- Silver Hawks
- Spider-Man
- Zorro
- The Lion Guard
- Mickey Mouse Clubhouse
- DuckTales
- Sofia the First
- 101 Dalmatian Street
- Fancy Nancy Clancy
- Muppet Babies
- Mickey Mouse Mixed-Up Adventures
- Miles from Tomorrowland
- Goldie & Bear
- Henry Hugglemonster
- Sheriff Callie's Wild West
- My Friends Tigger & Pooh
- Chuggington
- Princess Sissi
- The Triplets
- Winx Club
- Little Women II: Jo's Boys
- The Twisted Tales of Felix the Cat
- Anne of Green Gables
- Thundercats
- World Fairy Tale Series
- DuckTales
- The New Scooby-Doo Movies
- Candy Candy
- Rugrats
- SpongeBob SquarePants
- The Wild Thornberrys
- Doc McStuffins
- Minnie's Bow-Toons
- The Story of Perrine

== Entertainment ==
- Allaxe to - lifestyle and design program that shows viewers how to change their personal space. The show follows the makeover from start to finish and also gives a look at family members and their feelings on the changes taking place. Hosted by Spiros Soulis.
- Deste Tous (Watch them/Tie them) - The craziest group of Greek television is back after the great success of last season and promises to be even more caustic and enjoyable! Nikos Moutsinas and Maria Iliaki forefront having with them Katerina Kenourgiou, daily at 16:00 from 26 September. With new and favorite sections, Deste tous! continues and will be for another season your best afternoon companion. The much vaunted unity became fashion fans even in the political world, grows. So this year, in addition to the coveted prize of lame shoe for best-dressed of the week, will be awarded and the Olive slippers, the worst show of the week. Golden TV, the beloved and idiosyncratic standup comedy of Nikos, is back in a good mood to comment on current events and television to remind special moments of the past. And of course, the famous dance of Maria is expected to stir for another season crowds. These will add several new modules and original games that will be loved by them viewers. Deste tous!, and nothing will be left standing!
- Apo kardias - talkshow that deals with social issues affecting everyone. Various issues are discussed and attempts are made to help people solve their problems. Monetary gifts will be given to those, judged by the audience, to be in most need. Hosted by Andreas Mikroutsikos.
- Afto mas elipe - variety show that looks to inform and entertain. Features various guests from political figures to actors and athletes who liven up the mood. Also a look at the movie and theatre scene as well as social functions. Hosted by Sofia Alberti.
- Ikones - travel program that takes the viewer to far-off places and gives them a look at the people, their culture and the geography. It aired for four seasons, hosted by Taso Dousi.
- Big Brother - presented by Roula Koromila
- Η kouzina tis mamas - entertaining show that seeks to teach viewers, in a fun way, about cooking and eating healthy. Host Εftihis Bletsas travels the country visiting as many homes, and moms, as he can, to find out their special tips or secret recipes and to educate everyone about how and why we should eat properly. Along the way, he gives his special tips and tricks as well as information on health and diet. Eftihis also entertains everyone with music and singing. (2005–2009) (originally aired on ET3)
- Koita ti ekanes - variety show, with music, dance, laughs and more. With a live band and theatrical performances, this show keeps viewers and guests alike entertained. Hosted by Semina Digeni. Originally aired on NET.
- Kous kous to mesimeri - entertainment show that features entertainment, music and more; now in its third year on Alpha, hosted by Katerina Karavatou, Dimitris Papanotas, and Nikos Moutsinas
- Mes stn kali hara - weekend variety show, informative and entertaining; hosted by Natalia Germanou and Sissi Hristidou
- Ola (Everything) - comedy show with Themos Anastasiadis (2000-2006); it was cancelled after 2005-2006 season, but has now moved to ANT1, going by the name of Ola 7even
- Poios thelei na ginei ekatommyriouchos - Greek version of the famous question game-show Who Wants to Be a Millionaire? (2005–2006)
- To pio megalo pazari - hosted by Andreas Mikroutsikos (2006-??); the sequel to the 1993 gameshow To Megalo Pazari (also hosted by Mikroutsikos)
- Ne i ou? (Yeah or nope?) - gameshow hosted every Friday afternoon by Petros Phillipidis (2006-??).
- Pame paketo (The package) - hosted by Vicky Hadjivassiliou
- Siga min katso na skaso - talkshow presented by Fotis Sergoulopoulos and Maria Bakodimou; features news, stories and celebrities from the Greek entertainment scene
- TV stars, parousiaste! (TV stars, present!) - a reality game show featuring a quest to find the best new presenter in Greece; hosted by Betty Maggira and featuring Ilias Psinakis, Natalia Germanou and Kostantis Spyropoulos as judges
- Tha peis kai ena tragoudi (You will say a song) - presented by Andreas Mikroutsikos; based on the American Singing Bee
- Eleni - presented by Eleni Menegaki, informative and entertaining
- Happy Day ston Alpha - presented by Stamatina Tsimtsili, morning show, gossip, informative and entertaining
- Deal - presented by Christos Ferentinos
- Bake Off Greece - presented by Ioanna Triantafillou
- Ti Leei? - presented by Eleni Tsolaki, gossip, informative and entertaining
- Kitchen Lab - presented by Akis Petretzikis
- Ready, Steady, Cook - presented by Akis Petretzikis
- Pop Up - presented by Iliana Papageorgiou

== Foreign ==
- America's Funniest Home Videos
- Baywatch
- Beverly Hills, 90210
- CSI: Crime Scene Investigation
- CSI: Miami
- CSI: NY
- The Dresden Files
- ER
- Everybody Loves Raymond
- Frasier
- Hélène et les Garçons
- Law & Order: Special Victims Unit
- Melrose Place
- The Nanny
- Sex and the City
- Without a Trace
- Keeping Up with the Kardashians
- Beauty & the Beast
- Grey's Anatomy
- Third Watch
- Pacific Blue
- Little House on the Prairie

== News/information ==
- 7 meres Alpha - a look back at all the top news stories of the past week; examines the headlines from the world of politics, the economy, sports and entertainment; hosted by Βασιλική Παναγιωτοπούλου
- Anazitiseis - current affairs program that features journalists who investigate relevant issues also reports on missing person cases; hosted by Spiros Karatzaferis
- Antignomies - current affairs program that covers the issues that are making headlines; features a live discussion with various guests in studio; hosted by Nikos Hadjinikolaou
- Documento - news magazine that focuses public life and the key issues surrounding it as well as analysis and discussion on the problems facing everyday people; hosted by Nikos Manesis
- Exandas - documentary series presented by Giorgos Avgeropoulos; moved to NET
- I mihani tou hronou - examines stories that made the headlines in past years and investigates them further to uncover hidden truths; hosted by Christos Vasilopoulos, later moved to NET
- Kalimera sas (Good morning to you) - morning show which featured discussion with in-studio guests and news from all over Greece and abroad; hosted by Giorgos Aftias and Maria Nikoltsiou
- Pera apo ton orizonta - current affairs program that focuses on international news. Topics of discussion include politics, social issues, breaking news stories as well as a look at the customs and cultures of different countries around the world. Hosted by Demi Karagianni and Petros Gatzias.
- Proines selides - morning show for the weekend; features news and sports as well as a recap of the top stories from the week that past; hosted by Giorgos Ekonomeas
- Prosopa (Faces) - one on one discussion with various figures from public life. Guests include political figures, famous sports figures and those from the arts; hosted by Nikos Hadjinikolaou
- Studio Alpha - weekend morning program focusing on current affairs, news, discussion, panel of guests answering viewer questions and more; aired for 8 seasons and was hosted by Nikos Manesis
- To kouti tis Pandoras (Pandora's box) - documentary series that investigates various issues and attempts to uncover that story behind the story. Reports on events that have made headlines at some point, past or present. Presented by Kostas Vaxevanis. Moved to NET.
- Tlive with Tatiana Stefanidou (December 7, 2020 - July 5, 2024) - (formerly morning) afternoon information show presented by Tatiana Stefanidou focusing on everyday topics.

== Sports ==
- Alpha protathlima - live coverage of Alpha Ethniki, the Greek soccer league; three games live every week on Saturday, Sunday and Monday
- Paixte bala (no longer airs) - news, highlights and in-depth reports from the world of soccer. Host Pavlos Papadimitriou looks back at the weekend's games from the Greek first division as well as other leagues across Europe. Viewers also have a chance to win great prizes.

== Special Shows ==
- Mad Video Music Awards (formerly on Alpha TV, currently on Mega Channel - every June)
- Madwalk, the fashion music project (formerly on Alpha TV, currently on Mega Channel - every April)
