= Deste Tous =

- Directed by: Natassa E. Ioannou
- Starring: Nikos Moutsinas; Maria Iliaki; Katerina Kenourgiou; Giorgos Daskalos
- Music by: Ema
- Country of origin: Greece
- Original language: Greek

Production
- Producer: Plus Productions
- Running time: 1.46 hours
- Production company: As Dirolo

Original release
- Network: Alpha TV
- Release: September 13, 2009

Deste Tous (Watch them/Tie them) was a daily Greek television programme. The show premiered on September 13, 2009. The show stars Nikos Moutsinas, Maria Iliaki, Katerina Kenourgiou and George Daskalos.

The show offers prizes for various fashion competitions, such as lame shoe for best-dressed. The Olive slippers are awarded for the worst show of the week.

== Reporters ==
- Eirini Gkaniatsou
- Nikos Partsolis
- Constantina Vassiliou

== See also ==
- List of programs broadcast by Alpha TV
