= Makis Triantafyllopoulos =

Greek journalist and publisher (born 1954)

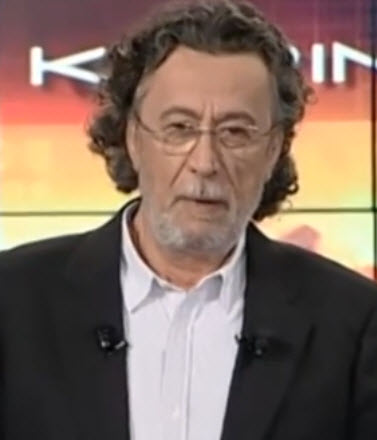
Triantafyllopoulos in 2014

Efthimios "Makis" Triantafyllopoulos (Greek: Μάκης Τριανταφυλλόπουλος; born 14 August 1954) is a Greek journalist and publisher. He was, along with Themos Anastasiadis, the publisher of Proto Thema newspaper and host of two television programmes, Zougla and Kitrinos Typos on Alter Channel. He uses his TV programmes to expose political scandals on television, usually using techniques like hidden cameras. He founded his own Sunday-newspaper VETO and is the owner of "zougla.gr" (jungle.gr), an internet newspaper in Greece.

Some of his exposés include the Paranga football scandal, the Paradikastiko judicial scandal in 2005, and the Fakelaki within the personnel of the Greek National Healthcare Service.

== Biography ==
Triantafyllopoulos was born in Thessaloniki in 1954 and is the son of Konstantinos Triantafyllopoulos, a major general in the gendarmerie, who hailed from Leontio in Achaea, and Eugenia. His father, who died in January 2012, was an officer and had served for many years in the personal security detail of the late prime minister Georgios Papandreou, at one point as head of the detail. During the period of the junta, he was court martialed and exiled.

His first cousin was Dimitris Triantafyllopoulos, a journalist who had run for political office with New Democracy.

He studied at the University of Bologna, Italy, before transferring to the law school of the University of Athens.

He worked as a journalist and became known through his television shows Zougla (Jungle) and Kitrinos Typos (Yellow journalism) and collaborated with several television stations: New Channel, Star, Skai, Ant1, Alpha, Alter, Zoom, Extra and Epsilon.

Along with his broadcast television and publishing activity, he had radio shows and maintains a news website, Zougla.gr. In August 2008, he became vice-president of Iraklis.

== Career ==
In 2005, along with Tasos Karamitsos and Themos Anastasiadis, he co-founded the newspaper Proto Thema, the first issue of which was published on 27 February 2005. In March 2008, it was announced that Triantafyllopoulos had sold his share of the newspaper to the Pegasus publishing company of the Bobolas family.

In November 2009, along with Thanasis Lalas, he issued the weekly newspaper Veto, which shut down in December 2010, due to financial problems. Thanasis Lalas had earlier left the newspaper.

== Problems with the justice system ==
During his journalistic career, Makis Triantafyllopoulos has been convicted by Greek courts several times and has often been disciplined by ESIEA, the Union of Journalist of Athens Dailies, Greece's largest journalists’ union. On 22 October 1995, ESIEA's disciplinary council imposed a six-month suspension of his membership following the charges of ailing people that were featured on his television programme Yellow Journalism. The appellate disciplinary council, pursuant to a petition by Triantafyllopoulos, decided to uphold the initial penalty.

In January 1996, ESIEA decided to expel Triantafyllopoulos for one year, following an extrajudicial legal declaration of a professor, who considered that he was offended by the journalist's radio programmes. The same year, an Athens lower court with several judges on the bench convicted Triantafyllopoulos, imposing a fine of 30mn drachmas, because he purposely and intentionally skewed the meaning of an isolated excerpt of remarks by MP Stelios Papathemelis, attributing to them a meaning diametrically opposed to the actual statements.

Papathemelis had filed a lawsuit, because on the programme Kitrinos Typos in 1995, Triantafyllopoulos implied that Papathemelis had been a supporter of the junta. At the same time, ESIEA penalised him by calling him to order. On 8 November 1996, ESIEA's disciplinary council suspended Triantafyllopoulos’ membership for one month, as it ruled that he had slandered a colleague. On 4 January 2001, the appellate disciplinary organ of ESIEA expelled Triantafyllopoulos for three months, as a lawyer had charged that he produced forged documents and had lied on one of his shows.

In 2002, a three-member Athens Misdemeanours Court convicted him and imposed a 15-month prison sentence over the repeated slandering of professor Alexandros Sideris, vice rector of the Agricultural University of Athens, whom he had accused on his show of building a vacation home in Dionysos on land that had been burned by arson. The petition for annulment submitted by Triantafyllopoulos was rejected by the Supreme Court.

In 2007, a one-judge misdemeanours court awarded 60,000 euros to the former mayor of Almyros, Spyros Rappos, for having been slandered, which the journalist had appealed. In 2009, the three-judge Volos misdemeanours court had in the same case imposed a two-year prison term, which could be bought off for 10 euros per day. The journalist filed an appeal.

In September 2009, an Athens Appellate Court awarded law professor Michail Stathopoulos 300,000 euros in damages, as it deemed “false, insulting and slanderous” Makis Triantafyllopoulos’ allegations that Stathopoulos participated in a para-judicial (trial fixing) gang. The journalist and Alpha television were obliged to pay the sum, which according to Stathopoulos would be given to the communications and mass media department of the University of Athens, to be used for research in journalistic ethics. Also, Adam Regouzas, a former New Democracy MP and deputy finance minister, has been vindicated by Greek courts regarding statements on Triantafyllopoulos’ shows.

Meanwhile, television channels with which he collaborated have been punished with fines by the National Radio and Television Council (ESR) over reports and the use of concealed cameras. Specifically, on 26 November 1996, Skai television was slapped with a five-million drachma fine for the use of concealed cameras on Triantafyllopoulos' shows Zougla and Kitrinos Typos. On 1 April 1997, Skai was punished with a 20-million drachma fine, for the use of concealed cameras.

In January 2000, Alpha television was handed down a 60mn drachma fine - and the ruling had to be broadcast for three days - for the use of concealed cameras and offending the honour of an individual. In May, 2000, Alpha was punished with the moral sanction of having to read out on news broadcasts for five days the ESR conviction regarding Triantafyllopoulos’ show, in which there were violations of constitutional clauses (regarding the free development of personality, and others). In December, 2000, the ESR delivered a warning to Alpha and the moral sanction that the condemnatory decision, regarding violations of the principle of presumption of innocence, must be read out for three days on news broadcasts. On 23, May, 2002, Alpha television was convicted and forced to pay 100,000 euros and to publicise the decision on news broadcasts for three days, as he had violated journalistic ethics in reporting on then MP Alexandros Chrysanthakopoulos. In October, 2004, Alter television was convicted and slapped with a 50,000 euro fine for public defamation. In July, 2005, a 40,000 euro fine was imposed for illegal recording.

There was a great uproar over the broadcast of scenes of composer Stephanos Korkolis with a 15-year-old girl. Korkolis was acquitted on all charges, including drug trafficking. ESIEA described the broadcasting of the video as "unethical television cannibalism". In addition, the Hellenic Data Protection Authority imposed a 35mn drachma fine on Triantafyllopoulos and the television station for which he worked for the broadcasting of a cassette. On two shows, on 2 December and 5 December 1999, excerpts were read out from the personal diary of fashion designer Michalis Aslanis. For this, ESIEA and the journalistic community condemned him, and monetary fines were imposed.

At various times, Triantafyllopoulos has clashed with criminal lawyer Alexis Kouyias and with his former collaborator Sokratis Giolias, whom he accused over his stance in the clash between publisher Yorgos Kouris and Alpha television owner Dimitris Kontominas. Triantafyllopoulos alleged that Giolias was the owner of troktiko.blogspot.com. Triantafyllopoulos has also been criticised for dodging mandatory military service, invoking mental health reasons. He claims that he did not serve because the Greek junta removed his father from the gendarmerie.

In June 2014, Gabriel Sakellaridis, a SYRIZA candidate in local elections, in a Facebook post charged that he had been politically blackmailed by a journalist, a thinly veiled reference to Triantafyllopoulos, who on internet posts warned that he would publicise a video with scenes from the candidate's personal life. For this, Triantafyllopoulos was criticised by a segment of the press and of the political establishment, as well as by ESIEA.
