= Camping (Cypriot series) =

Cypriot TV series

Camping (Κάμπινγκ in Greek) is a Cypriot television series that was broadcast by the Cypriot television station Alpha TV Cyprus from 2020 to 2022.

Camping was written by Fotis Georgides and directed by Nikolas Zikopoulos. The soundtrack was composed by Pavlos Kyriakou who also handled the audio post production of the show as well.

== Premise ==
An accountant moves his children to a campsite and along the way becomes embroiled in money laundering. The life of the residents of the campsite is disturbed and changed decisively, but it was probably never as calm as it seemed.
