= Dimitris Kontominas =

Greek businessman (1939–2022)

Dimitris Kontominas (Greek: Δημήτρης Κοντομηνάς; 3 June 1939 – 10 March 2022) was a Greek businessman who was active in insurance, television, cinema, and retail trade.

== Life and career ==
Kontominas was born on 3 June 1939 in Athens, Greece. He grew in Akadimia Platonos suburb of Athens. He passed his early years with his siblings, his mother and his grandmother.

He studied at the American University of Beirut. Initially he worked as an insurer in American Life (ALICO). In 1969, he cofounded with Alexander Tampoura the insurance company Interamerican. Interamerican now belongs to Eureko BV. Kontominas remained chairman until 2005. Interamerican is also known for the insurance package that offered in the crew of Apollo 11 space mission.

Kontominas owned Prime Insurance and MyDirect insurers. He founded or acquired other companies, including:

- Interbank (later acquired and absorbed by Eurobank in 1997)
- Intertech (exclusive representative of the Panasonic products in Greece). The share of Kontominas was given to Eurobank in 2021 as a compensation for the debts of Kontominas in the bank.
- Euroclinic Athens, since 2020 owned by a consortium of banks and investment funds.
- Novabank Greece SA (Because NovaBank's then parent company was Millennium BCP (Banco Comercial Português), on 6 November 2006, NovaBank was renamed Millennium Bank and afterwards absorbed and acquired by Piraeus Bank in 2013)
- InterJet – aircraft and helicopter fleet. Ceased operations in 2011.
- GreenFarm during early 2000s.
- Aris F.C. (1998-2001)
- Alpha TV and radio station Alpha 98.9 (66% held by German RTL Group until 2012, after then fully owned by DEMKO until the channel's sale to Vardinogiannis group)
- Village Roadshow Greece theaters. Sold in ANT1 Group (Greek media company) in 2022.
- Athens/Thessaloniki Channel 9 (now closed) and radio station Alpha 96.5 Radio in Thessaloniki. The TV station was sold to Vardinogiannis group in 2018, as well all the other media ventures of Kontominas group.

In 2012, Kontominas took back the shares of Alpha TV when RTL Group decided to exit.

Kontominas was the president of DEMCO GROUP, one of Greece's largest investment holding companies. It has a diversified portfolio, with holdings in media, financial services, entertainment, IT & telecoms, leisure & entertainment, and food & beverages. In its heyday, the company owned Village Group (cinema and films), Alpha TV and Alpha Radio, Intertech (Panasonic's exclusive representative in Greece), Prime Insurance, myDirect online insurance, Sportday newspaper and many more.

Between 1998 and 2001 he owned the football team Aris

He was declared "Great Protekdikos Archon of the Ecumenical Throne" by the Ecumenical Patriarchate of Constantinople and "Great Benefactor" by the Metropolis of Chalcedon.

He was arrested in 2014. According to the authorities approximately 200 million euros worth of loans were issued by the bank, during the period in question to companies controlled by certain well-connected businessmen without guarantees, none of which have been repaid. The case is also linked to another financial scandal involving another 300 million euros worth of losses due to bad loans made to a property developer. The accused faced charges including fraud, money laundering and complicity in malpractice. He was released in January 2014 on a €5,000,000 bail.

Kontominas died on 10 March 2022, at the age of 82. He had one daughter and two grandchildren. During the last years of his life and after his death, many of his properties have been sold, or are in the way for this.

== Sources ==
- Biography of Dimitris Kontominas at asfalistis.gr
- Dimitris Kontominas profile on bloomberg.com
- Demco Group of Companies of Dimitris Kontominas
