= Ela sti thesi mou =

- Genre: Comedy; Soap Opera; Telenovela
- Created by: Jörg Hiller; Claudia Sánchez; Rafael Rojas
- Based on: Nuevo rico, nuevo pobre
- Written by: Giorgos Kritikos; Mairi Zafeiropoulou; Stavros Kalafatidis; Giorgos Kokouvas
- Directed by: Giannis Vasiliadis; Spyros Rasidakis; Vasilis Tselemegos; Fay Tzanetopoulou; Georgia Zisi
- Starring: Giannis Tsimitselis; Athina Oikonomakou; Marinos Konsolos; Evaggelia Syriopoulou; Michalis Marinos; Andri Theodotou; Pavlos Evaggelopoulos
- Opening theme: Mi masiseis by Mr. Bachata & Los Mafiosos ft. Kelly Rabiosa
- Country of origin: Greece
- Original language: Greek
- No. of seasons: 5
- No. of episodes: 934

Production
- Executive producer: J.K. Productions – KARAGIANNIS
- Producer: J.K. Productions – KARAGIANNIS
- Production locations: Athens, Greece
- Running time: 45-60 minutes
- Production companies: Alpha TV & Alpha TV Cyprus

Original release
- Network: Alpha TV; Alpha TV Cyprus
- Release: October 3, 2016 – July 9, 2021

Ela sti thesi mou (English: Come to my place) Come to My Place is a Greek daily comedy television series, produced from 2016–2021, created by Giorgos Kritikos.

The central story of the series is based on that of the Colombian telenovela Nuevo Rico Nuevo Pobre created by Jörg Hiller, Claudia Sánchez and Rafael Rojas and broadcast from 2007 to 2008 by the television network Caracol Televisión. The series was broadcast on the television station Alpha TV from October 3, 2016 to July 9, 2021.

== Plot ==
The lives of two men, Vlasis Kalaitzis and Achilleas Sofokleous, from different social classes who learn that on the day they were born they accidentally switched families and now try to adapt to the new reality.

== Cast ==
- Giannis Tsimitselis as Vlasis Kalaitzis/Vlasis Sofokleous
- Athina Oikonomakou as Fay Stathatou
- Marinos Konsolos as Achilleas Sofokleous/Achilleas Kalatzis
- Evaggelia Syriopoulou as Renata Prokopiou
- Michalis Marinos as Damianos Sofokleous
- Andri Theodotou as Silvia Sofokleous
- Pavlos Evaggelopoulos as Leonidas Kalatzis
- Maria Filippou as Aimilia Sofokleous
- Charis Grigoropoulos as Thodoris Antipas
- Anastasis Kolovos as Makis Zouvas Chatzakis
- Manos Ioannou as Mimis Antipas
- Iro Loupi as Floretta Sofokleous/Stella Stamataki
- Apostolis Totsikas as Markos Iliadis Sofokleous
- Maria Androutsou as Miranta Zerva
- Natalia Dragoumi as Meni Pentedeka Schultz
- Antonis Kafetzopoulos as Antreas Sofokleous
- Kostas Triantafyllopoulos as Loukas Pasamitros
- Panos Stathakopoulos as Ilias Stylianou
- Kali Davri as Vana Toutoura
- Nikos Apergis as Fotis Prokopiou
- Ermolaos Mattheou as Zacharias Kontopodaridis
- Evi Daeli as Ismini Prokopiou
- Penny Agorastou as Latania Papaflorou
- Ntani Giannakopoulou as Mika Pasamitrou
- Anastasia Pantousi as Vasilina Schultz Sofokleous
- Vasiliki Aggeli as Elli Kompogiorga
- Myriella Kourenti as Marina
- Fiona Georgiadi as Thalia Kardassi
- Natalia Kyrikou as Liza
- Iro Pektesi as Zografia Gelatini
- Eirini Fanarioti as Kentra Theocharous
- Orestis Karydas as Gian Schultz
- Giorgos Koskorellos as Sifis Chatzakis
- Dimitris Papadakis as Manolios Atsalakis
- Orestis Tziovas as Thanos Kasteliotis
