= List of Sheriff Callie's Wild West episodes =

The following is a list of episodes from the series Sheriff Callie's Wild West.

== Series overview ==
Season	Segments	Episodes	Originally released	
Season	Segments	Episodes	First released	Last released
1	46	23	January 20, 2014	December 5, 2014
2	44	22	September 12, 2015	February 13, 2017

== Episodes ==
Unlike most Disney Jr. TV shows, the episode titles are sung, rather than spoken.

=== Season 1 (2014) ===
No. overall	No. in season	Title	Directed by	Written by	Storyboard by	Original release date	Prod. code	US viewers (millions)
1a	1a	"Horseshoe Peck"	Howard E. Baker (supervising)	Joe Ansolabehere	Patricia Wong	January 20, 2014	101a	1.35
After learning how to play horseshoes, Peck starts to brag about how good he is at horseshoes to the other townsfolk. Because of this, Sheriff Callie teaches Peck how to be a good sport when she challenges him to a game of horseshoes, and beats him at his own game.
1b	1b	"Callie's Gold Nugget"	Howard E. Baker (supervising)	Krista Tucker	Howard E. Baker	January 20, 2014	101b	1.35
When Callie finds a golden nugget, she decides to use it to fix a broken bridge. But when Sheriff Callie needs to help Farmer Stinky, she asks Toby and Peck to watch over it. When Peck and Toby lose it, they decide to paint a rock and make it look like a real gold nugget. After they reveal their deception, Peck admits to Callie that it was his idea to lie about losing her nugget. As Callie expresses her disappointment in Peck for lying to her, Peck learns that he can always be honest, no matter what.
2a	2a	"Train Bandits"	Howard E. Baker (supervising)	Ford Riley	Villamor M. Cruz Jr.	January 20, 2014	115a	1.42
While on the way to Junctionville with Governor Groundhog for the annual Sheriff's contest, Sheriff Callie takes care of business when three train bandits steal the Golden Star trophy that was destined for a awards ceremony to be awarded for "The Best Sheriff in the State".
2b	2b	"A Dirty Dusty Apology"	Howard E. Baker (supervising)	Krista Tucker	Natalie Long	January 20, 2014	115b	1.42
Dirty Dan and Dusty argue over which way the iron is when they mine for iron for Mr. Dillo. Sheriff Callie soon steps in and teaches them to say that they're sorry when they hurt each other's feelings during the argument, but, as they still continue arguing, they both put themselves into serious danger.
3a	3a	"Tricky Trouble"	Denis Morella; Howard E. Baker (supervising)	Elizabeth Keyishian and Kent Redeker	David Prince	January 21, 2014	108a	0.88
Peck and Toby get scammed by Tricky Travis who claims to be selling "Make Ya Strong Shirts". At the end of the episode, Callie realizes that the Make Ya Strong Shirts don't "make you strong", and then tells Peck and Toby that if something seems too good to be true, it probably is.
3b	3b	"Toby's Untrue Achoo!"	Denis Morella; Howard E. Baker (supervising)	Chelsea Meyer	Natalie Long	January 21, 2014	108b	0.88
Toby wants to show the town his new "Cowboy Cactus Kick Step" dance, but Sheriff Callie's getting all the attention because she gets sick. Due to this, Toby pretends to be sick just so he can get more attention. But, Toby discovers that being sick, along with pretending to be sick isn't fun especially since he misses the Hoedown Dance because of his so-called illness.
4a	4a	"Stagecoach Stand-Ins"	George Evelyn; Howard E. Baker (supervising)	John Loy	Joe Horne	January 22, 2014	119a	0.91
Peck and Toby get to drive the stagecoach when Pecos Pug the regular stagecoach driver is unable to drive it due to an injury that sidelined him for a week, however, they forget to get the important gold shipment that was needed to be delivered to River City while taking a dangerous shortcut through the Scary Prairie trying to avoid Sheriff Callie who Peck and Toby make mistake for a rough and tough bandit known as the "banjo bandit!"
4b	4b	"Gold Mine Mix-Up"	George Evelyn; Howard E. Baker (supervising)	Story by : Carin Greenberg; Teleplay by : Chelsea Meyer	Villamor M. Cruz Jr.	January 22, 2014	119b	0.91
Dirty Dan tells Uncle Bun to tell his brother Dusty there's no gold in Tricky Mine. Uncle Bun couldn't pay attention because he was tending to the other customers in the general store and misinforms Dusty that there is gold in Tricky Mine. Problems arise when Dusty goes mining over at Tricky Mine and is confused and nearly endangers himself. After saving Dusty, Uncle Bun apologizes for not listening to Dirty Dan's message and promises to listen more carefully next time.
5a	5a	"The Pesky Kangaroo Rat"	Howard E. Baker (supervising)	Kent Redeker	Chris Otsuki	January 23, 2014	114a	1.07
A baby kangaroo rat with a fondness for prairie pickles hitches a ride into Nice and Friendly Corners in Toby's basket and causes total chaos and destruction in town and driving Sheriff Callie crazy while trying to capture him. Then, Callie later learns by Tio Toturga's patience that being patient is the best way to catch a small pesky critter, no matter how long it takes.
5b	5b	"Cattle Overdrive"	Howard E. Baker (supervising)	Carin Greenberg	Gaelle Beerens	January 23, 2014	114b	1.07
Peck and Toby want to take a shortcut while herding Farmer Stinky's cattle out of the valley from their summer feeding grounds nearly endangering the cattle and themselves in the process.
6a	6a	"Sparky's Rival"	Denis Morella; Howard E. Baker (supervising)	John Loy	Patricia Wong	January 24, 2014	116a	0.68
Sparky feels jealous of the new, fast Iron Horse train which Mr. Engineer describes as being better than horses and runs off. Later, Sparky and Callie rescue Priscilla Skunk after she accidentally touches a lever that caused the Iron Horse to go out of control in a high speed, Sheriff Callie teaches Sparky that no train can ever replace a trusty horse.
6b	6b	"Jail Crazy"	Denis Morella; Howard E. Baker (supervising)	Story by : Joe Ansolabehere; Teleplay by : David Pitlik	Joe Horne	January 24, 2014	116b	0.68
While Sheriff Callie is helping Cody deliver his mail, Peck is appointed as the substitute sheriff. However, Peck goes out of control by putting all the residents of Nice and Friendly Corners in jail for reasons that make little sense and not knowing that an escaped convict named Billy Goat the Kid is ransacking the town stealing the townsfolks' belongings, including Peck's Horseshoe trophy.
7a	7a	"Toby Gets Nosy"	Howard E. Baker (supervising)	Scott Gray	David Prince	January 27, 2014	102a	0.94
When Toby gets a big bump on his nose before the first ever town picture, problems arise when the odd, pink bump gets bigger by the minute and there's virtually no way to cover it up until the bump blossoms into a beautiful and "purdy" cactus flower.
7b	7b	"Peck Takes it Back"	Howard E. Baker (supervising)	Kent Redeker	Natalie Long	January 27, 2014	102b	0.94
When Toby spills popcorn and milk on the jailhouse floor, Peck calls him a pinecone. This makes Toby wondering why Peck called him a pinecone and sets out in a dangerous quest seeking the answer. After cleaning the jailhouse, Peck tells Callie that he called Toby a pinecone, and Callie tells him that name calling is not a nice thing. Later, Peck regrets calling Toby a pinecone and begs for mercy.
8a	8a	"Sparky's Lucky Day"	Howard E. Baker (supervising)	Krista Tucker	Patricia Wong	January 28, 2014	103a	1.10
Sheriff Callie gets Sparky a "lucky scarf" in hopes that it will improve his racing skills before a big race after Sparky loses his confidence after slipping during a trial run.
8b	8b	"Peck's Bent Beak"	Howard E. Baker (supervising)	David Pitlik	Aaron Clark	January 28, 2014	103b	1.10
When Peck tries to eat one of Priscilla's "Belly Sinker Biscuits", he ends up bending his beak. Sheriff Callie calls the dentist, Dr. Wolf. The townsfolk, unaware of who he is, find him scary. So Toby tries to disguise himself as Peck to lure Dr. Wolf away while Peck looks for Sheriff Callie ending in a disastrous collision between the two.
9a	9a	"Toby the Cowsitter"	Denis Morella; Howard E. Baker (supervising)	Joe Ansolabehere	David Prince	January 29, 2014	105a	0.92
Toby earns money to buy milkshakes from Ella by promising to keep some cows tied up for the farmers attending a green bean convention at Red Gap, but fails to keep up with his promise in taking care of his charges.
9b	9b	"Callie's Blue Jay Blues"	Denis Morella; Howard E. Baker (supervising)	Scott Gray	Natalie Long	January 29, 2014	105b	0.92
Callie tries to stop a pair of blue jay brothers named Ray Jay and Jay Jay from stealing Farmer Stinky's corn crop during the annual Corn Pickin' Days festival. But Sheriff Callie discovers the real reason why they were stealing Farmer Stinky's corn crop and Sheriff Callie and Farmer Stinky helps them out in their time of need. After winning the contest, the Jay Brothers learns that asking for help is a lot better than stealing.
10a	10a	"Peck's Darling Clementine"	Howard E. Baker (supervising)	Michael L. Kramer and Holly Huckins	Chris Otsuki	January 30, 2014	107a	0.83
Tired of Clementine's tardiness and slowness, Peck decides to trade in Clementine for a fast horse named Lickety Split as his new ride but gets more than he bargains for because Lickety Split can be very tricky to stop. The other horses can't go to the slippery mud so Clementine hears Peck's cry and goes to rescue him and Dusty. Peck successfully rescues both of them and Peck is happy that Clementine saved them slowly but surely.
10b	10b	"Lasso Come Home"	Howard E. Baker (supervising)	Carin Greenberg	Rossen Varbanov	January 30, 2014	107b	0.83
Toby decides to use Sheriff Callie's Noodle Lasso without the proper training on how to use it and is abducted by a giant eagle which he accidentally lassoes.
11a	11a	"Twist and Shout"	George Evelyn; Howard E. Baker (supervising)	Story by : Chelsea Meyer; Teleplay by : Joe Ansolabehere	Rossen Varbanov	January 31, 2014	111a	1.00
After a spaghetti twister roars through town, Peck gets mistaken for a hero for ringing the town square bell when Clementine was the one who rung the bell.
11b	11b	"Calamity Priscilla"	George Evelyn; Howard E. Baker (supervising)	John Loy	Natalie Long	January 31, 2014	111b	1.00
When Frida Fox comes to town, Priscilla's jealousy causes her to try riding on horseback like a stunt rider, much like Frida. Soon, Priscilla Skunk realizes that it's best to be herself and use her expertise in growing beautiful roses after her horseback riding attempt turns out disastrous.
12a	12a	"King Stinky"	Howard E. Baker (supervising)	Scott Gray	David Prince	February 3, 2014	112a	0.97
The townsfolk decide to do favors for Farmer Stinky in order to get some rare prairie peppers. Unfortunately, there are not enough peppers for anyone. When Stinky revealed that he only has one pepper left, everyone gets upset with him for trading something he doesn't have, which is the same as not keeping a promise. To make it up to everyone, Farmer Stinky uses the last pepper to make prairie pepper soup and says that he'll keep his promises from now on.
12b	12b	"Abigail's Extra Big Story"	Howard E. Baker (supervising)	Krista Tucker	Villamor M. Cruz Jr.	February 3, 2014	112b	0.97
After reading Abigail's super-exaggerated news story about Vanilla Plains being a paradise with popcorn trees and soda pop springs that was discovered by explorers, Peck and Toby decided to explore Vanilla Plains not knowing that it was a desolated barren area filled with dangers. After saving Peck and Toby, Abigail confesses that she was actually bored due to the lack of news to write and promises that she will never write a made-up story again.
13a	13a	"Horsefeathers"	George Evelyn; Howard E. Baker (supervising)	Kent Redeker	Gaelle Beerens	February 4, 2014	117a	0.94
After seeing Clementine with feathers and thinking she grew them, Peck and Toby try to teach her to fly. However, it turns out Clementine was just covered with sticky molasses and the feathers got stuck to her.
13b	13b	"My Brother's Sleeper"	George Evelyn; Howard E. Baker (supervising)	Catherine Lieuwen	David Prince	February 4, 2014	117b	0.94
During the annual bed race, Dirty Dan and Dusty get overly competitive while racing with opposing teams during the race but when they get into deep trouble along with Peck and Toby, they both regret it.
14a	14a	"Callie Asks for Help"	Howard E. Baker (supervising)	Holly Huckins	Rossen Varbanov	February 6, 2014	104a	0.82
Tio Tortuga recalls the day that Callie got stuck in which is now known as Helping Hand Canyon and needed help from the townsfolk to get out of the canyon.
14b	14b	"Peck's Trail Mix Mix-Up"	Howard E. Baker (supervising)	Mike Kramer	Chris Otsuki	February 6, 2014	104b	0.82
Peck notices that some of his trail mix was missing and starts accusing the townsfolk for stealing his trail mix. It turns out that his sack has a hole because Peck puts his trail mix too close to his badge and failed to realize.
15a	15a	"Priscilla's Lost Love Bird"	Howard E. Baker (supervising)	Kent Redeker	Patricia Wong	February 14, 2014	106a	1.32
Priscilla's desert love birds named Paulie and Dolly escaped from their cage while meeting Governor Groundhog with the townsfolk after she accidentally knocks over the cage, so after capturing Paulie, both Peck and Sheriff Callie go on a hunt to find the missing love bird. They soon learn after a few disastrous rescues attempts that Dolly was attracted to Peck's whistling. And for his valiant effort was rewarded the largest shiniest Gold Star Badge by Governor Groundhog.
15b	15b	"Callie's Cowgirl Twirl"	Howard E. Baker (supervising)	Krista Tucker	Aaron Clark	February 14, 2014	106b	1.32
As Sheriff Callie prepares for the town's annual square dance, she gets a tin can stuck on her foot and while trying to pry the tin can off created a new dance step called "The Cowgirl Twirl" which was a hit at the square dance.
16a	16a	"The Pie Thief"	Howard E. Baker (supervising)	Krista Tucker	David Prince	March 7, 2014	120a	1.53
During a Pie Bake Off contest, Priscilla ate the competing pies and makes up a story about a pie thief who ate the pies and hides the pies she ate. Then while Callie and Peck are looking for the pie thief, Sheriff Callie must stop a real bandit who's robbing Ella's milk saloon from getting away.
16b	16b	"Fool for Gold"	Howard E. Baker (supervising)	Scott Gray and Joe Ansolabehere	Patricia Wong	March 7, 2014	120b	1.53
When Uncle Bun finds a huge nugget of gold in his backyard, he thinks that he's rich and that he can use it to move to the big city because he is convinced it's real gold. Soon, Uncle Bun gets rid of everything in his store including the general store itself but after he finds out that the nugget is actually fool's gold...which is worth not any money, Uncle Bun soon has to tell everyone the truth. But, everyone already threw a going-away party for him! Uncle Bun runs away but got in trouble so Sheriff Callie rescues him. Uncle Bun was too afraid to tell the truth because he didn't want to feel like a fool.
17a	17a	"Peck and Toby's Big Yarn"	Howard E. Baker (supervising)	Krista Tucker	Villamor M. Cruz Jr.	April 8, 2014	109a	1.78
Peck and Toby accidentally unravel Callie's blanket gift for Uncle Bun's birthday and tries to knit another blanket with disastrous results.
17b	17b	"My Fair Stinky"	Howard E. Baker (supervising)	Joe Purdy and Holly Huckins	Chris Otsuki	April 8, 2014	109b	1.78
After ruining the Flower Club meeting with his stink, Priscilla decides to turn Farmer Stinky into a refined proper gentleman. But things doesn't go too well without the old Stinky.
18a	18a	"Parroting Pedro"	Howard E. Baker (supervising)	Steve Sullivan and Andy Guerdat	Gaelle Beerens	May 23, 2014	121a	1.48
A newcomer in town named Parroting Pedro drives Peck crazy repeating everything Peck says and does. Peck thinks that everyone in town is teasing him, but Pedro doesn't realize that copying and repeating someone can cause so much trouble and make them feel a certain way. Due to this, Peck puts Pedro in jail. Later, Callie, after apologizing for Peck's actions, takes Pedro to Echo Canyon where Peck finds out how repeating after Peck made Peck feel.
18b	18b	"Toby Gets the Scoop"	Howard E. Baker (supervising)	Krista Tucker	Chris Otsuki	May 23, 2014	121b	1.48
Toby wants to be a reporter like Abigail and tries to find a "scoop" that is newsworthy but doesn't realize that his curiosity will get him into big trouble. Toby learns the importance of asking before touching.
19a	19a	"Here Comes the Sun"	Howard E. Baker (supervising)	Story by : Holly Huckins; Teleplay by : Ford Riley	Patricia Wong	June 6, 2014	113a	2.03
While camping out in the desert with Sheriff Callie and hearing Sheriff Callie telling them a spooky story, Peck and Toby, stay up terrified by the spooky noises, they then borrow Sheriff Callie's lasso while she's asleep. Everyone soon gets deprived of sleep and a horrific sweltering heat wave strikes Nice and Friendly Corners when Peck and Toby use the lasso to lasso the sun and get it to rise earlier! They finally decided to tell Callie about what they did and she tells them that they can't fix a mistake by making another mistake. Sheriff Callie uses her lasso and puts the sun back down and everyone was able to go back to sleep.
19b	19b	"Bug Trouble"	Howard E. Baker (supervising)	Krista Tucker	Aaron Clark and Chris Otsuki	June 6, 2014	113b	2.03
While an invasive swarm of berry biting bugs is threatening to destroy the town's rutaberry crop, Sheriff Callie calls on the townsfolk to gather at Farmer Stinky's farm to pick the rutaberries. Unfortunately the townsfolk bicker on which way is the best way to pick a rutaberry, but discovered that all of their different methods on picking rutaberries can work out if they all work together as a team.
20a	20a	"Moustache Toby"	Denis Morella; Howard E. Baker (supervising)	Story by : Krista Tucker; Teleplay by : Ford Riley and Krista Tucker	Natalie Long	June 20, 2014	122a	2.30
Toby sports a fake mustache in hopes that he be regarded as a rough, tough cowboy like his hero Sagebrush Sam. Unfortunately, it causes problems because the mustache that Toby picked is too long.
20b	20b	"Doc's Cheatin' Chili"	Denis Morella; Howard E. Baker (supervising)	Catherine Lieuwen and Joe Ansolabehere	Scott Bern	June 20, 2014	122b	2.30
Doc steals Tio's tres colores peppers during the annual chili cook-off, therefore resorting to cheat in order to be the winner of this year's annual chili cook-off but resulted in a fiery disaster of hot fiery chili that threatens to bury the town! Only Tio's cooling beans can cool down the fiery mess that Doc created.
21a	21a	"The Prickly Pair"	George Evelyn; Howard E. Baker (supervising)	Kent Redeker	Patricia Wong	August 29, 2014	123a	1.20
Peck feels replaced when Toby hangs out with his new porcupine friend, Polly-May, more than him.
21b	21b	"Crystal Cave Caper"	George Evelyn; Howard E. Baker (supervising)	Story by : Denis Morella and Scott Gray; Teleplay by : Scott Gray and Krista Tucker	David Prince	August 29, 2014	123b	1.20
Dirty Dan and Dusty are rescued by Sheriff Callie and Deputy Peck with an unlikely friend: A bat named Batty Belfry.
22a	22a	"Toby Braves the Bully"	Howard E. Baker (supervising)	Kent Redeker	Patricia Wong	October 4, 2014	110a	1.97
Toby is excited to be the first-ever newspaper delivery cactus. Unfortunately, a young bulldog starts to pick on him and tells Toby that Toby would be a "tattletale" if Toby tells on him.
22b	22b	"The Tumbling Tumbleweed"	Howard E. Baker (supervising)	Scott Gray	Aaron Clark	October 4, 2014	110b	1.97
The folks are cleaning up the town, but Peck wants to remove the tumbleweeds all by himself, without asking for help.
23a	23a	"Hike to Wish Mountain"	Howard E. Baker (supervising)	Story by : Scott Gray and Holly Huckins; Teleplay by : Scott Gray	Scott Bern	December 5, 2014	118a	1.04
Peck gets in trouble because he hikes the wrong way.
23b	23b	"Rhymin' Rodeo"	Howard E. Baker (supervising)	Lisa Kettle	Natalie Long	December 5, 2014	118b	1.04
Mr. Dillo overcomes stage fright with the help of Peck.

=== Season 2 (2015–17) ===
No. overall	No. in season	Title	Directed by	Written by	Storyboard by	Original release date	Prod. code	US viewers (millions)
24a	1a	"Boots or Consequences"	Robert Ramirez	Holly Huckins	David Prince	September 12, 2015	201a	1.69
When Toby discovers that a pair of boots were left alone at the bank of Nugget Creek, Toby must return these to the rightful owner instead of keeping them.
24b	1b	"The Good, the Bad and the Yo-Yo"	Robert Ramirez	Story by : Holly Huckins; Teleplay by : Joe Ansolabehere & John Loy	David Prince	September 11, 2015	201b	1.97
When a turtle wants Toby to find El Yoyo, it turns out that Tio was formerly El Yoyo.
25a	2a	"Peck's Deputy Drill"	Robert Ramirez	Krista Tucker	Julia Briemle	November 6, 2015	203a	1.09
When Peck is nervous on how to stop bank robbers, Sheriff Callie and Toby decides to pretend to be bank robbers. Meanwhile, the bandits have returned and successfully robbed the bank and Peck must find a way to stop them.
25b	2b	"A Fistful of Flowers"	Robert Ramirez	Story by : Andy Guerdat and Steve Sullivan; Teleplay by : Krista Tucker	Ruolin Li	November 6, 2015	203b	1.09
After the folks got cured by Priscilla's feel better flowers, Stinky ends up with the sniffles. When Priscilla's out of flowers, Sheriff Callie decides to come along with her to Golly Washer Canyon to get more feel better flowers for her cousin Stinky. Along the way, they both need to overcome their fears of mud and water to get the flower.
26a	3a	"Quilting Time"	Denis Morella	Andy Guerdat and Steve Sullivan	Stark Howell	November 13, 2015	204a	0.80
While everyone is putting patches on a quilt for Governor Groundhog for Founders Day, Peck and Clementine are making a special gift for him in Rocky Ridge: stone heads of the Governor. But Peck's special surprise only ends up putting the Governor and Peck in danger.
26b	3b	"When Dirty Turned Purty"	Denis Morella	Andy Guerdat and Steve Sullivan	Lee-Roy Lahey	November 13, 2015	204b	0.80
When Dirty Dan becomes clean and wearing all white clean clothes, Dirty Dan attracts everyone's attention and renamed himself Clean Dan. However, this depresses Dusty since he misses his dirty brother.
27a	4a	"A Barrel Full of Trouble"	Spencer Laudiero	Krista Tucker	Otis Brayboy	November 20, 2015	205a	0.84
When the train bandits successfully steal the town flag, Sheriff Callie and Deputy Peck must find a way to retrieve their flag from the bandits' fort.
27b	4b	"Peck Clowns Around"	Spencer Laudiero	Michele Gendelman and Ursula Ziegler	Dave Prince	November 20, 2015	205b	0.84
Peck wants to be a part of the Rodeo Show, but due to his failures on some tricks, Peck becomes too nervous to go because he didn't want to be a laughingstock. Then, after some encouragement from Sheriff Callie and Toby, Peck decides to be a rodeo clown. However, when two dog bandits steals the million dollar bull Angus, Peck must find a way to stop them.
28a	5a	"Toby's Christmas Critter"	Denis Morella	Andy Guerdat and Steve Sullivan	Lee-Roy Lahey	November 27, 2015	202a	1.00
It's Christmas in town, and Toby wishes that he had a riding critter like Sheriff Callie and Peck. However, when a pair of animal wranglers steals Santa's sleigh, Toby with a help of a reindeer named Comet must find a way to stop them from escaping. And later, Toby has a goat as his Christmas gift and named him Little Prickles.
28b	5b	"A Very Tricky Christmas"	Robert Ramirez	Holly Huckins	Roulin Li	November 27, 2015	202b	1.00
Tricky Travis and Oswald the Bear have returned and managed to steal the Christmas tree after Travis tricks the townsfolk with a marching band. However, the duo soon changed their minds when they see how happy the townsfolk are, but instead of locking them in jail, Sheriff Callie gives them a second chance.
29a	6a	"Bandit Toby"	Denis Morella	Chelsea Beyl	Andrei Svislotski	December 11, 2015	207a	0.98
A bandit named Kit Cactus arrives in Nice and Friendly Corners, and the townsfolk mistake him for Toby because they look so much alike. As Kit commits a series of thefts and causes trouble around town, Toby is wrongly blamed for the crimes and faces being driven out of town. With the help of Sheriff Callie and Peco, Toby must prove his innocence and expose the real culprit before Kit Cactus can strike again.
29b	6b	"Barnstorming Bandit"	Spencer Laudiero	Andy Guerdat and Steve Sullivan	Ruolin Li	December 11, 2015	207b	0.98
While Sheriff Callie is hunting for a barnstorming bandit, Peck is dismayed when he was tasked to stay in the jailhouse writing descriptions of the missing cows. It is soon revealed that the bandit uses a plane to steal the cows.
30a	7a	"Peck Gets Fooled"	Spencer Laudiero	David Pitlik, Andy Guerdat & Steve Sullivan	Stark Howell	December 18, 2015	206a	N/A
A chicken named Phineas Foolery was apprehended for cheating and Peck was on guard. However, when Peck falls for Phineas' tricks, Peck failed to realize that Peck is being fooled by the latter. Sheriff Callie, Peck, and Toby must stop him before he tricks anymore victims.
30b	7b	"Doc's Runaway Balloon"	Robert Ramirez	Lisa Kettle	Julia Briemle	December 18, 2015	206b	N/A
While everyone enjoys at the fun fair, Doc is busy filling his hot air balloon with helium and repeatedly fails. But when Doc accidentally releases the rope securing the balloon, Doc and Toby are on a wild balloon ride with Doc who's clueless on how to steer it.
31a	8a	"Sparky Runs Wild"	Denis Morella	Krista Tucker	Lee-Roy Lahey	January 6, 2016	208a	N/A
When Sparky became unhappy with Sheriff Callie not playing with him, Sparky decides to go free and play with the other wild horses, unaware that they are the targets of horse thieves. Sheriff Callie together with Deputy Peck must rescue her beloved horse and the other wild horses.
31b	8b	"Milkshake Shakedown"	Spencer Laudiero	Catherine Lieuwen	Otis Brayboy	January 6, 2016	208b	N/A
Ella becomes jealous of Toby when he impresses the customers with his milkshake tricks.
32a	9a	"Toby's First Snow"	Robert Ramirez	Steve Sullivan	Julia Briemle	February 1, 2016	209a	N/A
Toby is excited to go to the snowy mountains. But when a guzzle bear wrecks Dirty Dan and Dusty's camp, Toby becomes depressed when the snowy mountain is dangerous with the bear around. Later, Peck and Toby covered the whole town in sugar and flour to make it a snow day and Ella's soup unexpectedly lure the bear and then hibernate in their town. But when Toby accidentally woke the bear up, it becomes enraged and chased them but Sheriff Callie managed to make it hibernate by throwing the snowman in his cave. After that, Toby accidentally causes an avalanche creating a big snow ball but Sheriff Callie stops it with her lasso and then uses it to make snow in town.
32b	9b	"Blazing Skaters"	Andrei Svislotski	Story by : Bessie Nye; Teleplay by : Chelsea Beyl	David Prince	February 1, 2016	209b	N/A
Abigail decides to enter the Silver Skates Ice Contest since she's the best ice skater. However, the Silverado Brothers have been stealing every silver they find and while Sheriff Callie goes after the duo, Abigail decides to teach Peck how to skate to make the latter forget the accident last time. However, when Peck was shocked to see that Governor GroundHog is the judge, Peck's fear returns but soon overcomes it when he pairs up with Abigail to stop the Silverado Brothers and retrieved the Silver Trophy and they both win the trophy.
33a	10a	"The Long Adios"	Spencer Laudiero	Andy Guerdat	Doris Umschaden	February 15, 2016	210a	N/A
After a disaster with her performance, Frida Fox ends up with a crooked tail. Sheriff Callie becomes the substitute for Frida's performance. Unfortunately, Peck and Toby become worried because they think that Sheriff Callie might not come back to town.
33b	10b	"Fire Engine Fuss"	Spencer Laudiero	Kim Duran and Krista Tucker	Stark Howell	February 15, 2016	210b	N/A
Toby, Mr. Dillo and Tio decide to recruit members for their Volunteer Fire Department and succeeded after some encouragement from Sheriff Callie together with a fire engine. Unfortunately, things are about to turn worse when Peck, Priscilla, and Stinky are in a disagreement with each other and also using the fire engine for their own chores.
34a	11a	"Wrong Way Wagon Train"	Denis Morella	Steve Sullivan	Andrei Svislotski	February 22, 2016	211a	N/A
Three vultures end up in Nice and Friendly Corners after they got lost and asks Sheriff Callie for directions on how to get to Dead Wave County and Sheriff Callie accepts together with Ella tagging along. But little do Callie and Ella know that the vulture trio are actually bandits.
34b	11b	"Peck and Toby's Tall Twirl"	Robert Ramirez	Story by : Scott Sonneborn; Teleplay by : Carin Greenberg	Ruolin Li	February 22, 2016	211b	N/A
Peck and Toby are excited to ride the Twirl of Fun until they become upset that they're too short to ride it. While Sheriff Callie helps with Farmer Stinky's problem, Peck and Toby accepts a deal from Slick Eddy to wear elevator boots hoping they'll become tall enough to ride the Twirl of Fun. Unfortunately for Peck and Toby, it only causes problems for themselves and to anybody else in the fair. But thanks to their error, Farmer Stinky's problem is fixed and won the blue ribbon for his biggest watermelon.
35a	12a	"The Prize Fight"	Denis Morella	Story by : Michael Kramer; Teleplay by : Andy Guerdat	Kelly James and Fred Cline	February 29, 2016	212a	N/A
Peck and Toby argue over a pair of golden roller boots while bandits try to find a way to steal the golden roller boots from them.
35b	12b	"Buckle Hustle"	Denis Morella	Story by : Krista Tucker; Teleplay by : Michele Gendelman and Krista Tucker	Lee-Roy Lahey	February 29, 2016	212b	N/A
Tricky Travis tricks some townsfolk into trading him their most valuable possessions.
36a	13a	"Peck's Prisoner Promise"	Spencer Laudiero	Andy Guerdat	Doris Umschaden	March 8, 2016	213a	N/A
Three dog bandits rob the town bank and Sheriff Callie entrusts Peck to lock up the leader while Peck pursues his henchdogs.
36b	13b	"Toby's Two-Step Trouble"	Robert Ramirez	Kim Duran	Julia Briemle	March 8, 2016	213b	N/A
Toby judges the town's dance contest but the townsfolk don't play fair and gives him things so Toby can pick one of them as the winner.
37a	14a	"The Ballad of Sweet Strings"	Spencer Laudiero	Steve Sullivan	Stark Howell	April 11, 2016	214a	N/A
A horse named Johnny Strum begins using his voice to entrance the citizens of Nice and Friendly Corners to take their valuables and steals Sheriff Callie's guitar, Sweet Strings. Callie must stop him or risk falling under his spell too.
37b	14b	"Lost Popcorn Cavern"	Andrei Svislotski	Bart Jennett	Kelly James and Fred Cline	April 11, 2016	214b	N/A
The Milk Bandit tricks the townsfolk into digging a hole into Farmer Stinky's cavern so he can steal all the milk.
38a	15a	"Homestead Alone"	Andrei Svislotski	Rachel Forman and Krista Tucker	Ruolin Li	June 3, 2016	215a	N/A
Peck and Toby are left alone to defend the town against bandits, after the rest of the townsfolk accidentally leave them behind to see a wild west show.
38b	15b	"Where's Our Wishing Well?"	Denis Morella	Steve Sullivan	Lee-Roy Lahey	June 3, 2016	215b	N/A
The Trouble brothers steal the town's wishing well.
39a	16a	"How the Water Was Won"	Spencer Laudiero	Story by : Rachel Foreman; Teleplay by : Bart Jennett	Doris Umschaden	July 5, 2016	220a	N/A
Jolene and Jefro Beaver blackmail Sheriff Callie by damming up the creek. Now Peck, Toby, and Mr. Dillo must find a way to save the lake and save Sheriff Callie.
39b	16b	"Double Trouble"	Andrei Svislotski	Robert Lamoreaux & Michelle Lamoreaux	Stark Howell and Lee-Roy Lahey	July 5, 2016	220b	N/A
Tricky Travis, Oswald and the rest of the town search for the elusive outlaw Wildcat McGraw.
40a	17a	"The Great Halloween Robbery"	Spencer Laudiero	Steve Sullivan	Kelly James	October 3, 2016	216a	N/A
Bandits steal a giant jack o' lantern full of treats for entire town.
40b	17b	"The Ghost of the Scary Prairie"	Andrei Svislotski	Andy Guerdat	Fred Cline	October 3, 2016	216b	N/A
Peck tells Toby, Mr. Dillo, and Clementine a tale about the Ghost of the Scary Prairie. Things turn worse when the townsfolks start believing that Peck's story is real.
41a	18a	"Ella Sneaks a Peek"	Robert Ramirez	Story by : Adam Rudman; Teleplay by : Holly Huckins and Krista Tucker	Julia Briemle	October 10, 2016	218a	N/A
The townsfolk plan a surprise party for Ella. But her curiosity ends up getting the best of her.
41b	18b	"Tunnel of Trouble"	Denis Morella	Story by : Krista Tucker; Teleplay by : Robert Lamoreaux & Michelle Lamoreaux	Ruolin Li	October 10, 2016	218b	N/A
The Milk Bandit tries to steal all the town's milk during Dairy Days.
42a	19a	"Stagecoach to Yonderville"	Spencer Laudiero	Andy Guerdat	Lee-Roy Lahey	October 17, 2016	219a	N/A
Sheriff Callie attempts to lead a crowded stagecoach across a bandit-filled prairie.
42b	19b	"The Wild Brunch"	Andrei Svislotski	Story by : Jean Ansolabehere; Teleplay by : Scott Gray	Dave Williams and Gloria Y. Jenkins	October 17, 2016	219b	N/A
Uncle Bun and Tio get into a heated debate over who's the fastest pancake flipper. When the Vulture Brothers steals the pancakes during one of the performances, Uncle Bun and Tio accuses the other of cheating and ends their friendship. Eventually Sheriff Callie captures the brothers, retrieving the stolen pancakes, and Uncle Bun and Tio reconcile their friendship.
43a	20a	"Callie's Got Trouble"	Robert Ramirez	Steve Sullivan	Julia Briemle	October 24, 2016	221a	N/A
Callie captures Teddy of the Trouble Brothers and tries to change his troubled ways.
43b	20b	"Outlaw Roundup"	Denis Morella	Story by : Kim Duran; Teleplay by : Krista Tucker	Gloria Y. Jenkins	October 24, 2016	221b	N/A
Peck gets jealous when he reads a newspaper story praising Callie.
44a	21a	"New Sheriff in Town"	Andrei Svislotski	Krista Tucker	Stark Howell	November 7, 2016	222a	N/A
When Rustly Rustler had his minions switch the real ballot box with a fake ballot box to make himself the Sheriff on Election Day, it's up to Peck and Toby to find the real ballot box and reveal that the rustlers stole the election so the leader could be the sheriff. Eventually, the real ballot box is found and the winner is...Sheriff Callie!
44b	21b	"Buzzard Bust-Out"	Spencer Laudiero	Andy Guerdat	Lee-Roy Lahey	November 7, 2016	222b	N/A
The Buzzard clan traps the townsfolk inside Nice and Friendly Corners in an attempt to break the Brainstorming Bandit out of jail.
45a	22a	"The Heartless Valentine's Day"	Spencer Laudiero	Andy Guerdat	Stark Howell	February 13, 2017	217a	N/A
Sheriff Callie sets out to track down a group of bandits who steal all of the town's Valentine's Day cards.
45b	22b	"Mine All Mine"	Andrei Svislotski	Story by : Carin Greenberg; Teleplay by : Scott Gray	Doris Umschaden	February 13, 2017	217b	N/A
When new miners come to town, they argue with Dirty Dan and Dusty over who found a giant gold boulder first.

=== DJ Melodies (2015) ===
No.	Title	Original release date
DJ1	"Helpin' Folks"	May 4, 2015
DJ2	"Nice and Friendly"	May 5, 2015
DJ3	"You Told the Truth"	August 17, 2015
