= Nikos Chatzinikolaou =

Greek journalist and media entrepreneur

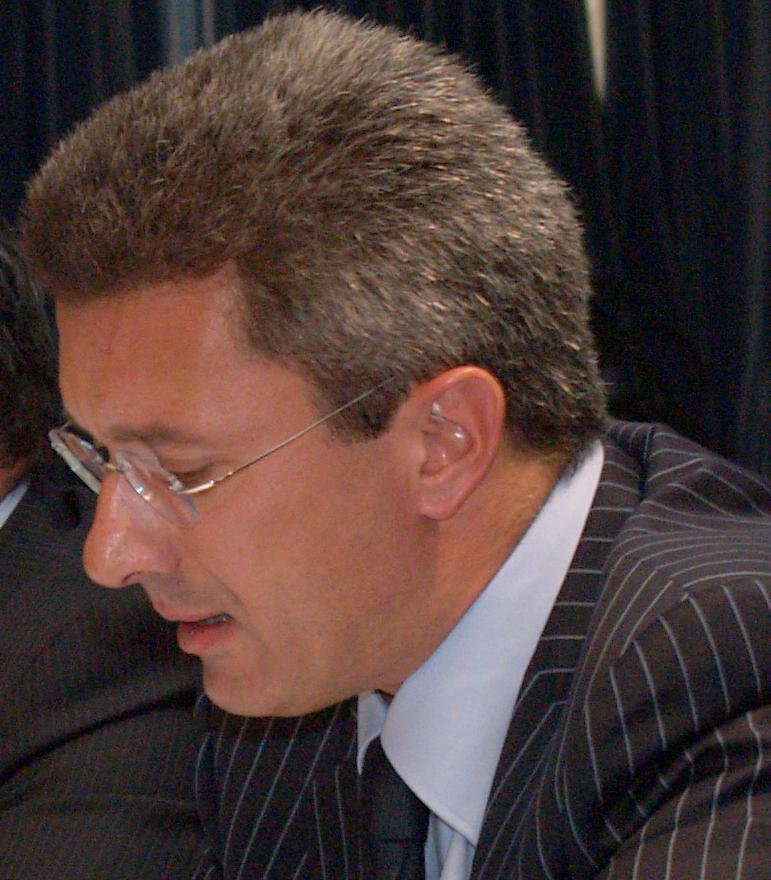

Nikos Chatzinikolaou (Greek: Νίκος Χατζηνικολάου) also spelled as Hatzinikolaou, Hatzinicolaou,Chatzinikolaou or Hadjinikolaou (born 1962 in Alexandroupoli) is a Greek journalist and media entrepreneur.

== Biography ==
Chatzinikolaou studied at Panteion University without receiving his university degree. He started his career in journalism as a columnist for Mesimvrini daily and later Acropolis. He was news anchor for Mega Channel from 1989 until 2003 when he moved to Alpha TV. He was president, head of the news department and central news anchor in Alpha TV for three years. In April 2007 he became the news anchor of Alter Channel. From 1989 onward, he hosted a weekly talk-show Enopios-Enopio (face-to-face) featuring various personalities from Greece and around the globe, including Bill Gates, Mikhail Gorbachev and Jimmy Carter.

In 2007 he founded Real Group, a company consisting originally of the radio station REAL FM 97.8 and later of the Sunday (newspaper) REAL NEWS and the website Real.gr. Within three years REAL FM became one of the most popular Greek radio stations, surpassing other radio stations that had been broadcasting for over fifty years. REAL NEWS instantly became one of the top 5 Sundays nationwide with respect to sales. In 2013 he moved to Star Channel where he was employed as the main (political) news commentator and the host of the weekly political show STON eNIKO . He subsequently left Star Channel in September 2016 when his contract expired. In January 2017, he signed with ANT1 where as of January 30, 2017, he took over as the main news anchor. He is also involved with the news website enikos.gr. Recently he started publishing every Saturday the financial newspaper AGORA.

Chatzinikolaou has received various prizes for his work in the field of Television News including Best Greek Journalist for 8 consecutive years.

== Family and private life ==
His father, Panagiotis Hadjinikolaou, was a member of the Greek Parliament and a Minister of Macedonia and Thrace with New Democracy party.

He married twice, to journalist Elena Katritsi and then to Kristi Tsolakaki, and he has three sons and one daughter.

== Television timeline ==
- 1989–2003 : Mega Channel
- 2003–2006 : Alpha TV
- 2007–2011 : Alter Channel
- 2013–2016 : Star Channel
- Since 2017: ANT1
