= Fos Sto Tounel =

- Directed by: Sotiris Spatharis
- Presented by: Aggeliki Nikolouli
- Country of origin: Greece

Production
- Executive producer: Kostas Sousoulas
- Editor: Dimitris Freskos

Original release
- Network: Skai TV (1995-1999), Alpha TV (1999-2001); Alter Channel (2001-2011), Alpha TV (2012-2021), Mega Channel (2021-)
- Release: October 1995

Fos Sto Tounel (Greek: Φως στο Τούνελ, English: Light In The Tunnel) is a Greek television live investigative program presented by crime journalist Aggeliki Nikolouli. The show focuses on finding missing people in Greece as well as solving crimes. It debuted in October 1995, has been broadcast continuously for over 20 years and has received numerous awards. As of 2019, in more than 827 episodes, the program has found more than 1610 missing people and has helped to solve about 25 murders.

== Format ==
The program is broadcast live weekly with a duration of about 3 hours and investigates the circumstances of disappearances helping to find missing people and solve crime cases. It features pre-recorded as well as live studio interviews with the friends and family of missing people and on-air appeals. Viewers can call the show live on-air and report their potential sightings and witness accounts.

Several later-convicted murderers have appeared on the show, either as guests or to search for their missing victims in an attempt to draw away suspicion. As of 2019, in more than 827 episodes, the program has found more than 1610 missing people and has helped to eliminate about 25 murders.

== Awards and honors ==
The show has received recognition both locally and internationally. It has received multiple awards over the years for its contribution to finding missing people and tracing murderers. The show has been registered in the Guinness Book of Records twice, originally in 1998 for the discovery, in a span of 75 episodes, of 85 missing people with a record of finding a woman living in France and missing for 58 years within 10 minutes. The show entered the Guinness Book of Records again in 1999, as "in a total of 130 episodes, 210 people reported missing to the police were found, some of whom had disappeared for fifty years".

Over the years, the show has collaborated with similar programs in other European countries, including Italy's "Chi l'ha visto?", Malta's "Tista’ Tkun Int", Albania's "Ku Je?", Denmark's ‘Missing People’ and Netherlands' ‘Spoorloos’ and ‘Vermist’. The Japanese national broadcasting organization NHK has made a tribute to the show and Nikolouli has also been invited to Russia's Wait for Me.
