= To Party Tis Zois Sou =

Greek television series

To Party Tis Zois Sou, (in Greek) Το Παρτυ της Ζωης Σου, (Literally: "The Party of Your Life") is a popular Greek television show. Directed by Maria Platanou and hosted by Akis Pavlopoulos, the show features lively dancing and singing.
