= InterJet =

IATA	ICAO	Call sign
-	INJ	INJET
- Founded: 1992
- Ceased operations: 2011
- AOC #: GR-012
- Hubs: Athens International Airport
- Fleet size: 8 (+1 order) jets and 4 twin engine helicopters
- Headquarters: Athens, Greece
- Website: http://www.interjet.gr/

InterJet was a private jet charter operator in the Greek business aviation market. InterJet was based in Athens and served the business community by chartering luxury private jets and helicopters for business needs and leisure breaks.

== Fleet ==
The InterJet fleet included the following aircraft (at 2 February 2009):

- 1 × Citation V Ultra
- 1 × Citation CJ3
- 3 × Citation XL/XLS
- 1 × Citation Sovereign
- 1 × Embraer Legacy 600
- 1 × Dassault Falcon 2000 EX

InterJet also operated 4 twin-engined helicopters.
