= Sheriff Callie's Wild West =

American animated series

- Genre: Preschool; Comedy; Action; Western; Adventure
- Created by: George Evelyn; Denis Morella
- Developed by: Holly Huckins
- Voices of: Mandy Moore; Lucas Grabeel; Jessica DiCicco
- Opening theme: "Sheriff Callie's Wild West Theme Song" by Mandy Moore
- Ending theme: "Sheriff Callie's Wild West Theme Song" (instrumental)
- Composers: Mike Himelstein; Michael Turner (season 1); Mike Barnett (season 2)
- Country of origin: United States
- Original language: English
- No. of seasons: 2
- No. of episodes: 45 (89 segments) (list of episodes)

Production
- Executive producers: Holly Huckins; George Evelyn (season 1); Denis Morella (season 1); Richard Marlis (season 2); Carmen Italia (season 2)
- Running time: 22 minutes (11 minutes per segment)
- Production companies: DHX Media Los Angeles (season 1); Wild Canary Animation (season 2)

Original release
- Network: Disney Junior
- Release: January 20, 2014 – February 13, 2017

Sheriff Callie's Wild West is an American animated children's television series created by George Evelyn, Holly Huckins, and Denis Morella, the creators of Higglytown Heroes, and then aired on Disney Junior. The series borrows elements from the Western genre with the theme of the series revolving around "getting along with each other".

The first season was produced by DHX Media Los Angeles, while the second season was produced by Wild Canary Animation. Sheriff Callie's Wild West debuted on the Disney Junior App on November 24, 2013. It first aired on January 20, 2014, with an 11-minute episode preview aired in the "Magical Holidays on Disney Channel" programming event on December 13, 2013. The show also previewed on Disney Junior in Canada on January 25, 2014, at 7:25 p.m. EST. It officially premiered on February 2, 2014, and ended on February 13, 2017, after two seasons.

Sheriff Callie's Wild West received generally positive reviews from critics. It is available to stream on Disney+.

== Plot ==
In the Wild West town of Nice and Friendly Corners, everyone is an anthropomorphic and cute animal. They all get along and are friendly to each other. However, there are times when the townsfolk get into problems or don't get along with each other. The series follows Sheriff Callie, a female calico cat and the sheriff alongside her friends Deputy Peck, a male red woodpecker and keeper of the town jail and Toby, a male saguaro cactus. Together they all solve problems and teach the townsfolk to get along with each other while working hard to make the town the friendliest in the west.

== Episodes ==
| Season | Segments | Episodes | Originally released | |
| Season | Segments | Episodes | First released | Last released |
|---|---|---|---|---|
| 1 | 46 | 23 | January 20, 2014 | December 5, 2014 |
| 2 | 44 | 22 | September 12, 2015 | February 13, 2017 |

== Characters ==
=== Main ===
- Sheriff Callie (voiced by Mandy Moore) is a calico cat. A self-described cowgirl, she serves as the sheriff to Nice and Friendly Corners. She is able to ride a horse, do a front flip, and do a flexed arm hang on a rope carrying a horse between her thighs for over 5 seconds. She sings, writes songs and plays her guitar called "Sweet Strings". Her catchphrases are "Sweet sassafras!". "Leaping lassos!" and "What in whiskers?". In the original Oki's Oasis, she was to be named "Oki". In the opening she claims that some say she is the "best in the west". She is a skilled lassoer, using a magic noodle lasso that can turn into different shapes for different purposes, such as in "Peck's Bent Beak" when she is able to form it into a stairway to help a dangling Peck down, or a hammer to pound in loose nails.
  - Sparky (vocal effects provided by Dee Bradley Baker) is Sheriff Callie's trusty blue horse.
- Deputy Peck (voiced by Lucas Grabeel) is a woodpecker and the sheriff's deputy of Nice and Friendly Corners. He's good at sweeping the jail house and serving as second-in-command to Sheriff Callie, but he's a bit of a bragger and a perfectionist. Peck calls Toby his best buddy. Peck's favorite food is trail mix, and he tends to end sentences with "...on account of I'm the deputy!" as well as say "Holy jalapeños!"
  - Clementine (vocal effects provided by Jessica DiCicco) is Deputy Peck's strong and stubborn mule. She is slow and not quite trusty.
- Toby (voiced by Jessica DiCicco) is a friendly saguaro cactus whose full name is Tobias P. Cactus. He is referred to as Peck's best friend. Toby sees the good in everything and is almost always happy. He is able to hang 1-armed for at least 5 seconds. This cactus also is a great dancer and loves to have fun. He wants to learn how to twirl a noodle lasso like Sheriff Callie, and will often tag along on Callie and Peck's adventures while using a barrel for transportation by rolling on it. Toby loves milkshakes and popcorn as well. He also can play the harmonica. Sometimes, when his spines get into trouble, he claims that he's "a pokey cowpoke". In "Toby Braves the Bully", he becomes a newspaper delivering cactus, but gets bullied by a visiting bulldog named Bradley. In the original Oki's Oasis, he was to be named "Kiko".
  - Little Prickles (vocal effects provided by Dee Bradley Baker) is a goat that Toby received as a Christmas present from Santa and Comet in "Toby's Christmas Critter". Toby is later seen riding him in "Sparky Runs Wild", "Wrong Way Wagon Train" and "New Sheriff in Town".

=== Recurring ===
- Governor Groundhog (voiced by Kevin Michael Richardson) is a groundhog who is the governor of the as-yet-unknown state where Nice and Friendly Corners is located.
- Uncle Bun (voiced by Kevin Michael Richardson) is a rabbit who owns a general store. He is a bit forgetful sometimes, and dreams of moving to the big city someday. It is hinted in "Peck and Toby's Big Yarn" that he is 7 years old.
- Ella Cowbelle (voiced by Mo Collins) is a cow who runs a milk saloon and serves up frosty glasses of milk and delicious milkshakes. Ella also has a talent for juggling milkshakes. Her catchphrase is "Sweet Buttermilk!"
- Priscilla Skunk (voiced by Cree Summer) is a female skunk who loves to look her best. Priscilla, clad in satiny pink frills, loves roses and all sorts of flowers as well as makeup. She, however, one time was jealous of Frida Fox and wanted to ride a horse and do tricks like her. She is Farmer Stinky's cousin and at one time was upset with him for ruining her meeting with the Flower Society and tried to change him into a debonair gentleman.
- Farmer Stinky (voiced by Kevin Michael Richardson) is a monotone male skunk who is the cousin of Priscilla. While Priscilla is clean and tidy, Farmer Stinky is usually dirty and lives up to his name. He can grow rare prairie peppers.
- Dirty Dan (voiced by Gary Anthony Williams) is a peccary miner who is Dusty's younger brother. His occupation is mining, like his older brother Dusty.
- Dusty (voiced by Gary Anthony Williams) is a peccary miner who is Dirty Dan's older brother. He likes mining just like his younger brother Dirty Dan.
- Baxter Badger (voiced by Carlos Alazraqui) is a badger who serves as the town banker. Despite his purpose in town, he doesn't seem to have any effect on any storyline.
- The Prairie Dogs (voiced by Jessica DiCicco and Lucas Grabeel) sometimes recap events through song. There are three. One is male and plays guitar and wears a red cowboy hat, another is also male and plays banjo and wears a straw hillbilly type hat, and another is female and does not play any instruments but wears a sunbonnet. In the episode "Here Comes the Sun", the Prairie Dog trio wore night shirts, night caps and a nightgown in the night sequences.
- Abigail (voiced by Mo Collins) is a tall white crane and the town's newspaper writer and editor-in-chief who sometimes exaggerates her stories. She is also an accomplished figure skater.
- Rita Rattler (voiced by Mo Collins) is a rattlesnake who lives outside of town. She wears a straw bonnet with a feather on it.
- Frida Fox (voiced by Mo Collins) is a fox and stunt rider. She is good at riding and roping, making Priscilla jealous at one point.
  - Sampson is Frida's horse.
- Pecos Pug (voiced by Jeff Bennett) is the stagecoach driver for the stagecoach line that goes through Nice and Friendly Corners. He was once jailed for eating Sheriff Callie's cookies without asking.
- Dr. Wolf (voiced by Kevin Michael Richardson) is a dentist. Everyone, at first, thought because of his appearance that he look like a big scary wolf looking to cause harm to Deputy Peck. He soon revealed that his true identity was just a dentist looking to cure Peck's bent beak. He likes cactus juice with extra thorns.
- Doc Quackers (voiced by Jeff Bennett) is a duck who is the town's doctor.
- Cody (voiced by Jeff Bennett) is a roadrunner who serves as the town's mailman.
- Tio Tortuga (voiced by Carlos Alazraqui) is a wise old Hispanic-American tortoise. He owns a purple top hat with a blue feather plume on it that he calls his "lucky hat". He is also revealed to be "El Yo-Yo".
- Mr. Dillo (voiced by Jeff Bennett) is an armadillo who is the town's blacksmith. He creates the horseshoes that Sparky wears.
- Mr. Engineer (voiced by Carlos Alazraqui) is a fussy raccoon who's the locomotive engineer for the railroad that goes by Nice and Friendly Corners. He brags that his "Iron Horse" can move faster than any horse, which upsets Sparky at one point.
- Buster is a bunny rabbit whose name was revealed in "Peck's Darling Clementine."
- Polly May Porcupine is a female North American Porcupine character. When Toby becomes friends with her, Peck feels left out since he's not prickly.
- Parroting Pedro (voiced by Carlos Alazraqui) is a green parrot who drove Peck crazy with antics.
- Santa Claus (voiced by Kevin Michael Richardson) is a traditional, secular figure of Christmas good cheer, who is the best known mascot of Christmas, developed in the United States as an amalgam of the story of St. Nicholas and various other seasonal folk heroes, with many aspects provided by the classic poem "A Visit from St. Nicholas".

=== Bandits and Outlaws ===
- Tricky Travis (voiced by Rob Paulsen) is a scrawny con artist coyote.
- Oswald (voiced by Kevin Michael Richardson) is a large slightly oafish bear who's Tricky Travis' assistant. Despite being a bandit, he can often be slow, much to his boss' chagrin.
- The Trouble Brothers, also known as the Train Bandits, (voiced by Jeff Bennett, Kevin Michael Richardson and Rob Paulsen) are a trio of wolves whose names are Grey, Red, and "The Boss". They rob Mr. Engineer's train. Only two of them can be seen in some episodes. They have a younger brother named Teddy who was reformed. They also appear in "Peck's Deputy Drill" and "Barnstorming Bandits".
- The Milk Bandit (voiced by Flea) is a bobcat who robs Ella's milk saloon.
- Kit Cactus (voiced by Jessica DiCicco) is a cactus. Kit impersonates Toby and causes havoc and steals things. None of the townsfolk can tell him apart from Toby, despite his being a different shade of green, having a black hat instead of an orange hat, having black thorns instead of yellow thorns, and having a different voice. As such, they accuse Toby of being the one who is committing all the crimes.
- Billy Goat the Kid (voiced by Gary Anthony Williams) is a goat. He's a bandit who broke out of prison, but was recaptured by Sheriff Callie and Deputy Peck.
- The Rustler Trio (voiced by Rob Paulsen and Gary Anthony Williams) are a group of dog bandits who often attempt to steal valuables. At one point, their first appearance in Season 2 was “Peck Clowns Around” where they both stole the million dollar bull named Angus at the Rodeo, but were stopped by Sheriff Callie. Another time was in “Toby’s Christmas Critter” they stole Santa’s reindeer (except Comet) with a new member named Dwayne (a dog character). Their leader even attempts to overthrow Callie as new sheriff by cheating in the election.
- The Silverado Brothers (voiced by Iggy Pop and Henry Rollins) are a duo of speedy stoat bandits who only appear in the winter. They always wear ice skates and have their sights set on anything made of silver.
- Phineas Foolery (voiced by Keegan-Michael Key) is a rooster who is a card shark and is known to trick people to make his getaway. He even fooled Peck three times.
- Johnny Strum (voiced by Chris Isaak) is an anthropomorphic horse who is a musician and can put people into a trance with his singing. He is usually known for original theft and owns a horse named Memphis.
- Wildcat McGraw (voiced by Clancy Brown) is a dangerous and elusive outlaw Wildcat.
- Jethro (voiced by Jacob Craner) and Jolene Beaver (voiced by Mo Collins) are two mischievous beaver siblings. They built a dam in the creek to blackmail Sheriff Callie.
- Barney the Barnstorming Bandit (voiced by Jess Harnell) is a buzzard who uses a biplane to steal cows.
- The Buzzard Clan, Dingus Fink (voiced by Diedrich Bader), Durwood Fink (voiced by Jesse Hughes), and Ma Fink (voiced by Tress MacNeille) are the family of Barney the Barnstorming Bandit, and also bandits themselves.
- Bradley Bulldog (voiced by Dee Bradley Baker) is a visiting bulldog who appears in "Toby Braves the Bully". He was a picking on Toby and said that if he told, he would be a "tattletale." Bradley even took Toby's brand new scooter, and threw his newspapers. Toby was afraid to tell Sheriff Callie the truth before Callie reassured Toby that he's not a tattletale because he told on a bully. Then Bradley learned the important lesson that being a bully was wrong.
- The Pie Thief is a made up character shown in Priscilla's story about him.
- Jay and Ray Jay (both voiced by Rob Paulsen) are blue jay birds. Both resort to corn theft due to a severe drought, but change after they are offered assistance and a chance to reform. Jay is the oldest and Ray is the youngest. They were mistaken for bandits.
- The Horse Thieves (voiced by Dee Bradley Baker and Carlos Alazraqui) are a bobcat and wildcat duo of horse thieves who attempted to abduct Sparky when he ran wild with a herd of wild horses. They were stopped and arrested by Sheriff Callie and Deputy Peck.

== Production ==
"Davy would always do the right thing but then he'd turn around and become a super-action hero – and that's Callie. She'll moralize and teach good social ethics, but when it's time to jump on a horse and lasso a tornado, she does it".

— Creator George Evelyn, describing about Callie's personality and role

The series was announced in 2011 under the working name "Oki's Oasis" during the Summer Television Critics Association with Mandy Moore voicing the main character, depicted as a white and gray tabby cat. It was announced to be released at the end of 2013, however, it got pushed back to January 20, 2014 due to several changes to the name and characters. The name changes possibly had to do with the fact that "Oki" and "Kiko", the original names of Sheriff Callie and Toby, were Japanese names that would not be very fitting in a show set in the Old West. (Kiko also spelled Quico are also the nicknames for Francisco and Frederico in Spanish.) On November 18, the official website was launched with the character information and minigames.

In an interview with Holly Huckins, George Evelyn and Denis Morella in TV Guide, Huckins stated that "We've had so much fun taking all those classic cowboy devices – from tornadoes and cattle stampedes to train robberies and the High Noon shootout – and making them kid-appropriate in order to teach lessons about sharing and forgiveness and good manners". Morella also stated that "There's even a saloon! "But there is no liquor and no rowdy, scary drunks" .She also said that "Ella the cow, who runs the establishment, serves up milkshakes, fruit juice and other healthy drinks – but we still slide those drinks down the bar like in the old western movies!". The team also stated that the series takes inspiration from several Western movies and series like The Andy Griffith Show, Green Acres, Quick Draw McGraw and the classic 1950s Disney series Davy Crockett. "We did our research and found that the real Wild West wasn't anywhere near as wild and frightening as Hollywood's ultra-violent, gun-slinging mythology would have us believe", Evelyn says. "The West was settled primarily by people who were intent on obeying the rules, people who went the distance to help each other out – and that's the town of Nice and Friendly Corners!".

Lucas Grabeel, the voice of Deputy Peck stated in an interview that "Sheriff Callie always comes in at the last minute and saves the day and teaches everyone a really valuable lesson and that's the other great part of it". He also said that "The kids who watch the show will not only hear an original country song every episode, but they'll also learn a very simple but very valuable lesson". Grabeel also said that "I've always loved doing silly voices" and that "This is my first series regular position on any show, so that was definitely a change. Even though I had done [voice over work] in the past, I was still a little nervous about how it was going to go. But the family that surrounds Sheriff Callie's Wild West is such a warm, welcoming group of veterans and very experienced people in the voice over world. They welcomed me in and said, 'You're good, just trust yourself'. They were right. It was really great to be a part of it".

== Music ==
The series features a variety of western music and songs inspired from country pop to Appalachian. The second season also includes elements of latin pop in some episodes. The opening song of the series is performed by musician Mandy Moore, who also provides the voice of the main character. Evelyn said that "Mandy Moore did such a great job for Disney in Tangled and we're thrilled to have her with us. She's the perfect voice for Callie – sweet when she needs to be but she can quickly pull out that spunk and attitude when necessary".

== Reception ==
=== Critical response ===
Hannah Johnson of Screen Rant asserted, "Callie teaches young viewers that everyone has a unique combination of stereotypically gendered traits, and this unique combination is not something to be ashamed of. Instead, it makes us helpful to ourselves and our community". Carey Bryson of About.com said, "A Western for preschoolers – such a perfect genre to get kids excited and teach them about good ol' manners, friendship and fairness. The visual style of this series is cute, but not exceptional. The strength of the series lies in Old West flavor, including awesome Western style music and all the folksy characters we would think of in a Western show – the milkshake saloon owner, the wise old tortoise, the javelina miners Dirty Dan and Dusty, the roadrunner mailman...the list of adorable Old West characters goes on and on" and that "Sheriff Callie's bringing Western back, and preschoolers, as well as their parents, will appreciate this friendly and flavorful show". Emily Ashby of Common Sense Media gave the series a grade of five out of five stars, praised the positive messages and role models, citing sportsmanship and compassion, and wrote, "Catchy songs and the show's cute incorporation of its Old West theme give this show real flair, and the fact that it casts a pink boots-wearing girl as the town sheriff goes a long way to bridge the gender gap as well"

=== Ratings ===
The series' premiere received impressive ratings. On Disney Junior, it received a total viewer record of 1.35 million at 5:00 p.m. It was also the 4th series telecasted to attract a 4.3 rating, making the #1 telecasted to appeal on all preschool demographics. The series also received more viewers at 5:30 p.m., with a total number of 1.42 million viewers and rating scores of 4.7 for kids 2–5, 5.0 for boys 2–5, and 4.3 for girls 2–5, making it the #1 series broadcast in the half-hour to appeal to the core demographics. The series also ranked at the number 1 spot in the Watch Disney Junior App in November, with a total of 23 million video views in its launch.

=== Accolades ===
| Year | Award | Category | Nominee(s) | Result | Ref. |
|---|---|---|---|---|---|
| 2016 | Annie Awards | Best General Audience Animated TV/Broadcast Production for Preschool Children | Sheriff Callie's Wild West | Nominated | |
| 2016 | Annie Awards | Outstanding Achievement in Music in an Animated TV/Broadcast Production | Mike Himelstein, Joe Ansolabehere, Mike Barnett | Nominated | |
| 2016 | Daytime Emmy Awards | Outstanding Writing in a Pre-School Animated Program | Andrew Guerdat, Steven Sullivan, Holly Huckins, Krista Tucker | Nominated | |

== In other media ==
=== Video games ===
- Sheriff Callie's Wild Day.
- Sheriff Callie's: Deputy for a Day.
- Sheriff Callie's: The Great Bandit Round-Up.
- Sheriff Callie's Tales of the Wist West.
