= Louis Patsalides =

Cypriot comedian (born 1980)

- Born: 23 October 1980 (age 45); Nicosia, Cyprus
- Occupations: Stand-up comedian, television host
- Years active: 2006 – present
- Known for: Louis Night Show
- Spouse: Astero Kyprianou (m. 2007)

Louis Patsalides (Greek: Λουής Πατσαλίδης; born 23 October 1980) is a Cypriot stand-up comedian, television presenter of the Louis Night Show and radio host. He was a spokesperson for the Eurovision Song Contest 2021.

- List of Cypriots
- List of stand-up comedians
