= The Adventures of Marco & Gina =

- Created by: Romano Scarpa
- Starring: Federico Di Pofi; Valentina Mari; Gianni Giuliano; Maria Paiato; Piero Tiberi; Oreste Baldini; Luigi Ferraro; Giuliano Santi
- Countries of origin: Italy; France
- No. of seasons: 1
- No. of episodes: 26

Production
- Running time: 25 min.
- Production companies: European Broadcasting Union; France Animation

Original release
- Network: Rai 2 and Rai Gulp (Italy); CBBC (UK)
- Release: 30 September – 29 December 2001

The Adventures of Marco & Gina is a 2001 French-Italian animated series produced by the European Broadcasting Union (EBU) and France Animation. It was created by Romano Scarpa (and his final project until his death in 2005), and it was aired in 2001.

== Plot ==
Pigeons, doves, sparrows and seagulls live and work together compared to the human crowd in Venice. Venice-Above has existed at least as long as Venice-Below. Conflict arises in each episode, with the pigeons Marco and Gina dodging and foiling the Count Yagor and Sgarry, his henchman/henchbird.

== Production ==
Before The Adventures of Marco and Gina, Romano Scarpa was known as Disney comic book's artist. He was also hired to work on DuckTales episodes, Scarpa pitched his own test to the series for Disney, but, the initiative was halted after one test because animating the series in Italy, while guaranteeing best quality, would have taken more time and money than the Asian studios that Disney supported itself on.

In 1988, Scarpa began to developing his own animated series, initially titled as The Winged Venetians with featuring two main characters, Wiggy and Peggy (both names were changed to Marco and Gina), and the show's set taken to Rome. Scarpa wanted to make The Winged Venetians as an animated short film, but he expanded the materials (including concept arts) for 10 years. Lanterna Magica bought the right to The Winged Venetians in 1998, and the show was retitled as Gone With the Wings, until RAI, the Italian television broadcaster, picked up the series.
