= Alpha TV =

Greek free-to-air channel

- Country: Greece
- Broadcast area: National
- Headquarters: Viltanioti 36, Kifissia, Greece

Programming
- Language: Greek
- Picture format: 1080i HDTV (downscaled to 16:9 aspect ratio 576i for the SDTV feed)

Ownership
- Owner: Alpha Satellite Television S.A. (50% Motor Oil Hellas, 50% United Group)
- Sister channels: Alpha TV Cyprus

History
- Launched: 27 September 1999
- Replaced: Skai TV (1993–1999)
- Former names: Alpha Sky (27 September – 24 October 1999)

Links
- Website: Alpha TV

Availability

Terrestrial
- Digea: All over Greece at local frequencies

Streaming media
- Alpha: ALPHA TV LIVE

Alpha TV is a Greek free-to-air channel, one of the biggest stations in Greece. The station features a mix of Greek and foreign shows with an emphasis on entertainment. The studios are located in Kifissia and Pallini. Alpha TV is owned by Alpha Satellite Television S.A. In Cyprus, private broadcaster Sigma TV used to broadcast a number of Alpha's programs. In the past, public service broadcaster CyBC used to broadcast Alpha TV programs. In 2015, Alpha TV Cyprus was founded, and broadcast the Alpha TV Programs and others of its own. Alpha TV Cyprus is now one of the highest-rated Cypriot channels.

== History ==
- 1993: Skai TV was launched to compete with Mega and ANT1 similar to ERT Channels. It began broadcasting with a heavy emphasis on news and sports. At the time, its sister station was the #1 ranked radio station in Athens, Skai 100.4.
- 1994: Skai TV began to exchange family/children's programmes from Star Channel with Alpha's children's programming.
- 1999: Skai TV sold, renamed Alpha Sky, later A-Sky during a transition period and now to Alpha TV.
- 2002: Alpha TV begins broadcast of its international network called Alpha Australia and signs up with UBI World TV to make it available outside of Australia as well as Asia and Africa.
- 2007: Alpha TV launches its channel Alpha Sat into North America on DirecTV.
- 2008: Alpha Australia debuts in New Zealand via UBI World TV. Alpha TV sold to RTL Group, who now control the majority share in the company.
- 2012: RTL Group sell their share to Dimitris Kontominas, giving him full control of the channel.
- 2016: On 4 April, makes premiere the Cypriot version, called Alpha TV Cyprus.

When the channel was called Skai TV, it was written using Greek letters. It was Latinized and changed to a blue font in 1999 when Tsotsoros bought it from Giannis Alafouzos. In September 1999, it became Alpha-Sky before changing to its present name in October of the same year. The logo was retained despite the changes in the channel's name.

The font letters in 2003 changed and a circle was added over Alpha, but the two As (alphas) remain. In the 2005-2006 season, the logo was changed to Alpha, the first letter of the Greek alphabet, to reflect the channel's popularity. This season, a new version was introduced and is coloured with red. The logo was updated prior to the launch of the 2007–2008 season.

In December 2008, Dimitris Kontominas sold a majority share (66.6%) of Alpha TV to Luxembourg media company RTL Group. Kontominas will continue to be involved with Alpha as he still owns 33.4% and has been named the president of the new holding company called Alpha Media Group.

In March 2009, the company made significant changes to the news programming output. The afternoon news show has been cut to 15 minutes in duration and now airs at 14:00. The main evening news has also moved from the highly competitive slot of 20:00 and instead broadcasts at 19:00.

On 5 January 2012, RTL Group announced that they had reached an agreement to sell their share to minority owner Dimitris Kontominas, making him once again the full owner of the channel. The deal was finalized by the end of the first quarter of 2012.

In the summer of 2018, some of its shows moved to Star Channel facilities and on October 30, the purchase of 50.1% of his shares by the Vardinogiannis group was announced, which later acquired the remaining shares, making him the full owner.

In mid-2022, Primos Media, owned by an investment group in Luxembourg, acquired half of the channel's shares, which was later sold to United Group, with the other half and management remaining with the Vardinogiannis group.

== Current programs ==
=== Talk shows ===
- Happy Day (2014–today)
- Super Katerina (2021–today)

=== Game show ===
- Deal (2016–today)

=== Soap operas ===
- Oikogeneiakes Istories (Family Issues) (2010–today)

== Former shows ==
=== Soap operas ===
- Asteria stin ammo (2019–2020)
- Ela sti thesi mou (2016–2021)
- San Oikogeneia (2016–2017)
- Kato apo tin Akropoli (2001–2003)

=== Game shows ===
- Divided (2019–2020)
- Pano Kato (2019–2020)
- Nota Mia (2017–2018)
- Slam (2017–2018)
- Ready Steady Cook (2017)
- Akou ti eipan! (2013–2016)
- Fatus Olous (2008–2010)
- To pio megalo pazari (2006–2007)
- Poios thelei na ginei ekatommyriouhos? (2006)
- Diplo Paihnidi (2004–2005)

=== Talk shows / variety shows ===
- Style me up (2021–2022)
- Pop Up (2020–2021)
- Ora gia Meleti (2020)
- Mi Masas (2020)
- Adelina xtypa to koudouni (2020)
- Menoume Alpha (2020)
- Ektos Grammis ston Alpha (2019–2020)
- Alpha Pantou (2018–2021)
- Ti Leei? (2018–2019)
- Alpha Reportage (2017–2019)
- To kalytero zevgari (2017)
- Eurodata (2017)
- Xanadeste tous (2016–2017)
- Logo Tivis (2015–2016)
- Spiti mou spitaki mou (2014–2017)
- Ola Paizoun (2014–2015)
- Kairos sto para deka (2014–2015)
- Proino Reportage (2014–2015)
- Kalokairi Pantou (2014)
- Shop TV (2013–2017)
- Eleni (2011–2020)
- Deste tous! (2009–2014)
- Kati Psinete (2009–2017)
- Pano stin ora (2009–2011)
- Siga min katso na skaso (2008–2009)
- Ti paizei simera (2007–2008)
- Alithies kai Psemata (2007)
- Kous Kous to mesimeri (2005–2011)
- Kafes me tin Eleni (2005–2011)
- Apo Kardias (2005–2006)
- Mageirevontas me ti Vefa (2005–2006)
- Kalimera sas (2004–2009)
- Proino Kous Kous (2004–2005)
- Me tin kali ennoia vevaia (2004)
- Kainourgia Mera (2002–2006)
- Boro (2001–2004)
- Kalos tous / 11 kai kati (2001–2004)
- Kainourgia Imera (2000–2001)
- Apo to Alpha os to omega (1999–2000)

== Alpha Cyprus ==
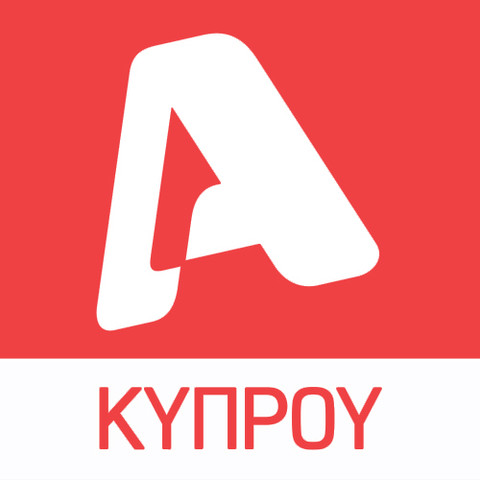

Alpha TV Cyprus founded in 2015. A year later, in April 2016, begins operations. Alpha TV Cyprus broadcasts across the country. The channel broadcasts Alpha Greece programs, and also new Cypriot programs. Now, Alpha TV Cyprus is one of the highest-rated channels in Cyprus, with a 13.5% share.

== Alpha Sat ==

Alpha Sat is the international service of the channel of the same name for the Greek diaspora. It broadcasts its program in Asia, Africa, Australia, New Zealand and North America. Alpha Sat launched in Australia in May 2002 and in June 2008 in New Zealand. In June 2012, UBI World TV ceased operations, and as a result, Alpha Sat was temporarily unavailable to viewers in Australia. In January 2013, the channel re-launched via TV Plus, an upstart satellite provider.

In North America, Alpha Sat launched in May 2007 in the United States on the DirecTV platform. On 1 January 2011, Alpha Sat moved to a rival satellite platform Dish Network.

On May 14, 2013, was officially added to the CRTC's approved the list of foreign services, allowing the channel to expand into Canada. Odyssey, who sponsored the application to get the channel on the approved list, is the official Canadian distributor of the channel. Alpha Sat officially launched in Canada on 30 July 2013, via Rogers Cable and Vidéotron. It is also available on Bell Satellite TV and Bell Fibe TV.

== Reporters ==
- Dimos Verikios
- Antonis Sroiter
- Nikos Manesis

== See also ==
- List of programs broadcast by Alpha TV
