= Richard Sanderville =

Piegan Blackfoot linguist and interpreter

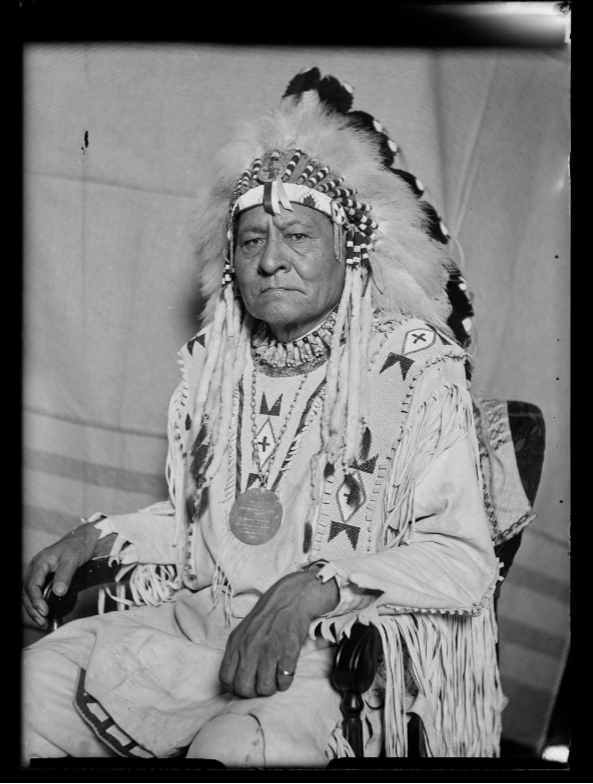
- Portrait of Sanderville by Carl Bohnen, courtesy of the Smithsonian Institution
- Born: Richard Sanderville c. 1866; Fort Benton, Montana Territory, U.S.
- Died: February 25, 1951; Heart Butte, Montana, U.S.
- Education: Carlisle Indian Industrial School
- Occupations: Interpreter, linguist, language preservationist

Richard "Dick" Sanderville (c. 1866 – February 25, 1951), also known as Richard Sandoval, Chief Bull or Bull Head, was a Indigenous American farmer, interpreter, language preservationist, and tribal leader of the Piegan Blackfeet. Sanderville was a practitioner of Plains Indian Sign Language (PISL), a lingua franca used by Plains Indians, and was critical to the preservation of the Piegan dialect of Plains Sign Language. Many of Sanderville's narratives utilizing Plains Sign Language are preserved and held by private institutions including the Smithsonian Institution and the Denver Art Museum.

== Early life and education ==
Sanderville was born in 1866 in Fort Benton, Montana (then part of Montana Territory) to a Mexican-Shoshone father, Isador Sandoval Jr., and a Piegan Blackfoot mother. Sanderville's father and grandfather were both named Isadore Sandoval, however the family's Spanish name was later anglicized. Isadore Sandoval Sr. (also spelled Isidore) was a translator, hunter, and trapper for the American Fur Company at Fort Union on the Missouri River. Isadore Sr. worked as a translator for Prince Maximilian of Wied-Neuwied and later James Kipp during the fur trade in Montana. Due to Sanderville's Spanish ancestry he is considered multiracial by some ethnologists, such as by John C. Ewers.

Sanderville was educated at the St. Ignatius Indian School in St. Ignatius, Montana. From March 26, 1890, to November 8, 1892, Sanderville received education at the Carlisle Indian Industrial School, an American Indian boarding school in Carlisle, Pennsylvania as part of the Indian Civilization Act. While at Carlisle Sanderville had his portrait taken by John Nicolas Choate. After graduating from Carlisle Sanderville attended the Fort Shaw Indian Boarding School in Fort Shaw, Montana from January 1, 1893, to January 6, 1894.

== Career ==
Following his education Sanderville lived on the Blackfeet Indian Reservation in northwest Montana where he worked as a farmer and carpenter. Sanderville expressed an early interest in language interpretation while at his agency, however, there was no need for an interpreter. Instead, in his free time Sanderville wrote an extensive genealogy of various families of the Piegan Blackfeet as well as preserving some of the tribes traditions and oral histories.

Sanderville formally began his career as an official government interpreter and translator in 1895 and worked in this capacity until 1932. Beginning in 1934 Sanderville began working for John Galen Carter, an American anthropologist who focused on the preservation of the culture of the Gros Ventre and Assiniboine. Sanderville provided Piegan translations to Carter at the Bureau of American Ethnology during the summer of 1934 in order to preserve the tribe's distinct language.

Sanderville later actively collaborated with Hugh L. Scott and the Smithsonian Institution to preserve the form of Plains Indian Sign Language (PISL) utilized specifically by the Piegan Blackfeet, quickly becoming one of the "greatest living authority" on Plains Indian Sign Language. Scott's work in the field of PISL was heavily influenced by ethnographer Garrick Mallery who also specialized in PISL, Mallery being one of the first specialists in PISL to compile mixed media on the subject. Sanderville eventually became Scott's primary informant on PISL and assisted in the writing of the Dictionary of Indian Sign Language, an experimental film dictionary which utilized sign language, rather than written words. The Dictionary of Indian Sign Language is often remarked as being one of the earliest attempts of salvage ethnography made by both Scott and Sanderville. When Scott died in 1934 Sanderville continued his work in translating PISL materials for the audio-visual branch of the National Archives and Records Administration.

Sanderville was an open critic of the National Park Service, particularly Horace M. Albright, due to the expansion and encroachment of Glacier National Park onto federally recognized Blackfoot land in 1930's. Sanderville later helped establish the Museum of the Plains Indian in North Browning, Montana. Outside of interpreting and translating Sanderville worked for the Culver Military Academy in Culver, Indiana in 1943 during World War II.

== Personal life ==
Sanderville was married twice in his life, first to Nancy Sheppard, a Kutenai woman, in 1894, and later to Anna Alberton, a Blackfoot woman, in 1917 following Nancy's death.
