= Band and Battalion of the U.S. Indian School =

1901 silent film

- Produced by: American Mutoscope and Biograph Company
- Cinematography: Arthur Marvin
- Release date: April 30, 1901
- Country: United States
- Languages: Silent film English intertitles

Band and Battalion of the U.S. Indian School is a silent film documentary made on April 30, 1901, by American Mutoscope and Biograph Company made in Carlisle, Pennsylvania, USA. The cinematographer was Arthur Marvin. It depicts a parade drill by the cadet corps of the American Indian School which includes many representatives of the Native American tribes in the United States. The head of the parade was the renowned Carlisle Band of the Carlisle Indian Industrial School. In 1902 Marvin produced another documentary, Club Swinging at Carlisle Indian School for AM&B.

== See also ==
- American Mutoscope and Biograph Company
- Silent films
