= Oscar Hiram Lipps =

Oscar Hiram Lipps (1872 - 1969) worked at the Carlisle Indian School in Pennsylvania, was superintendent of the Nez Perce Agency, was superintendent at the Chemawa Indian School, and was a field representative of the U. S. Indian Service. He wrote a two volume book on the Navajo. The University of Oregon has a collection of his papers.

Lipps was born in Fayette, Indiana. He studied in Harriman, Tennessee (American Temperance University?).

Lipps was the superintendent at the Carlisle School from July 1915 through March 1917 when he was succeeded by John Francis Jr.

== Bibliography ==
- The Navajos, The Torch Press, Cedar Rapids, Iowa, The Torch press, 1909
- The Navajo Volume I
- The Navajo Volume II
- Laws and regulations relating to Indians and their lands; compiled by Oscar H. Lipps, Lewiston Printing & Binding, Lewiston, Idaho, 1913
- The Case of the California Indians, Chimewa, Oregon, School print shop, 40 pages, illustrated, 1932
- Daily Lesson Plan Book for Vocational Instructors, 1919
- History of the Art of Weaving Among the Navajos, article published in the Red Man
