= Carlisle Indian School Digital Resource Center =

The Carlisle Indian School Digital Resource Center is a publicly accessible digital archive of material originating from or pertaining to the Carlisle Indian Industrial School that operated in Carlisle, Pennsylvania from 1879 to 1918. The archival project has been undertaken by the Archives & Special Collections Department of the Waidner-Spahr Library at Dickinson College in Carlisle, and by the Community Studies Center at Dickinson College, with the help of numerous project partners including subject-area experts and cultural advisers. The project seeks to aggregate the disparate information from various sources locally and nationally into a single digital collection representing the complicated political and ethical issues surrounding the school as well as the lives of those Native Americans who studied there during its existence.

== Mission ==
The project is intended to be a comprehensive and searchable public archive of all available data regarding the school. Though official administrative documents are included in the collection, the curators have also sought out media owned by private organizations and individuals both locally and nationally, with a stated future goal of facilitating public submission of material to the archive for review and possible curation. The specific goals of the project have been defined as follows:

- Digitize research material from the National Archives and Records Administration and other repositories, including Dickinson College, the Cumberland County Historical Society, and any others who wish to collaborate.
- Make the digitized materials accessible via a dedicated website utilizing appropriate content management tools.
- Design courses that actively engage students in the digitization and research processes.
- Develop a comprehensive searchable database using the information contained in the digitized materials (e.g. names, dates, tribal affiliations, enrollments, outings, etc.).
- Create search and display functions for the database so that users can query the data and generate unique analyses. Also permit sharing of the complete database to allow more thorough and detailed analyses by interested individuals.
- Develop the capability for user interactivity, so that individuals may contribute photos, documents, oral histories, etc.
- Develop teaching and learning materials utilizing the digitized content and database (e.g. data visualizations, GIS, etc.).
- Support the creation of original scholarly and popular works based on content maintained within the resource center.

== Scope of the Digital Resource ==
Currently the digital resource center contains administrative documents associated with the students and instructors, images from the National Archives as well as private institutional archives and individuals, articles from and complete editions of campus publications, lists and rosters of students and rolls for various events and campus happenings, and administrative documents pertaining to the operation of the school. As of April 2017, the archive contains:

- 8,297 student files and information cards digitized from the National Archives and Records Administration. Digitization of these files is complete, but posting to the site is ongoing.
- 933 images from student files, school publications, the Dickinson College Archives and Special Collections, the Cumberland County Historical Society, private collections, and user contributions.
- 214 Publications originating from the school itself, including the campus publications The Red Man and The Indian Helper. Digitization of these assets is ongoing.
- 74 lists and rosters documenting outing records, arrivals, departures, deaths, and basic student information. Digitization of these assets is ongoing.
- 152 documents related to the administrative and operational activities of the school, including student arrivals and departures, supplies requisitions, fundraising, and athletics. Digitization of these assets is ongoing.

In addition to archival material, the project includes 9 premade lesson plans about the Carlisle Indian School, designed for both secondary and post-secondary classrooms. The project also links out to numerous additional resources, including both primary and secondary materials of a scholarly nature.

== Copyright Status of Curated Media ==
Media in the Carlisle Indian School Digital Resource Center is protected under the Creative Commons Attribution-NonCommercial-ShareAlike 4.0 International License.
