= Marianna Burgess =

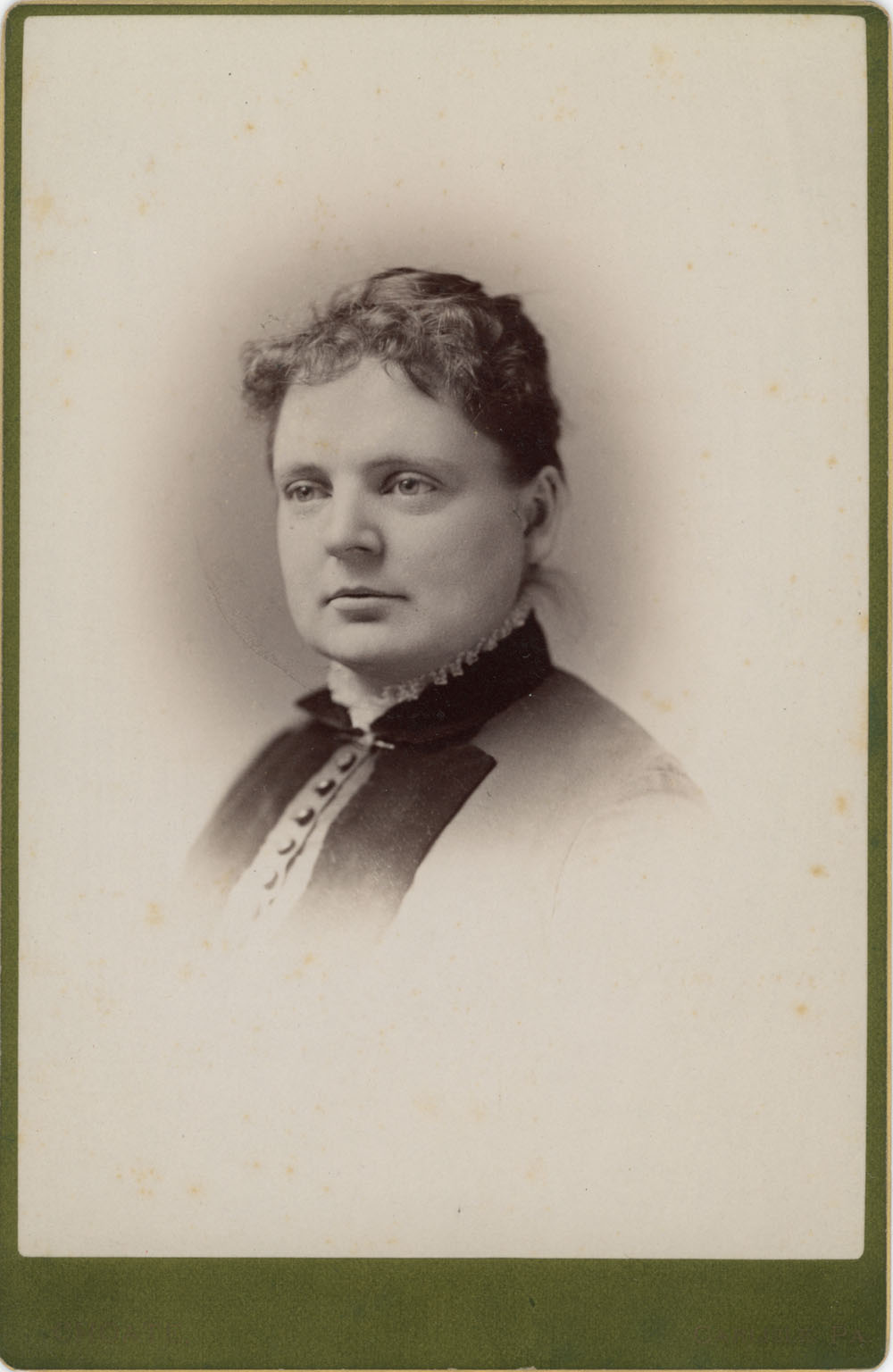
- Born: June 6, 1854; Pennsylvania
- Died: March 21, 1931 (aged 76); Los Angeles
- Occupation: Writer

Marianna Burgess (6 June 1854 – 21 March 1931) was a teacher at the Carlisle Indian School and author of the novel Stiya: A Carlisle Indian Girl at Home (1894).

== Life and career ==
Marianna Burgess was born in Pennsylvania, the daughter of Quaker parents William Burgess and Mary Burgess. William Burgess was a printer and educator who served as a Pawnee Indian agent until he was fired in 1876 for fraud. Marianna Burgess worked as a teacher on the Pawnee Reservation.

In 1880 Burgess began teaching at the Carlisle Indian School. She was also placed in charge of the school's printing press and its newspapers and other publications. Burgess left the school in November 1904.

== Stiya ==
The book is the first person account of a young Pueblo woman who returns to her home after five years at the Carlisle Indian School. She is presented heroically attempting to get her tribe to adopt Western hygiene and domestic practices while her tribe attempts to force her to conform to Pueblo ways, which are presented as unsanitary and otherwise negatively.

The book was published under the name "Embe" and beyond a small copyright notice for "M. Burgess," the author is otherwise unidentified. Stiya is presented as the author, with a frontispiece photo of a teenage Native American woman identified as Stiya. While there was a Pueblo student named Stiya at Carlisle, the photograph is actually of an Apache student, Lucy Tsisnah. Laguna Pueblo author Leslie Silko was the first to identify Burgess as the author. Silko recounts an argument between her great-grandmother, who wanted to burn the book due to its offensive and inaccurate portrayal of Pueblo life, and her aunt, who wanted to preserve the book as evidence of the racism and lies of the US government.
