= Moses Friedman =

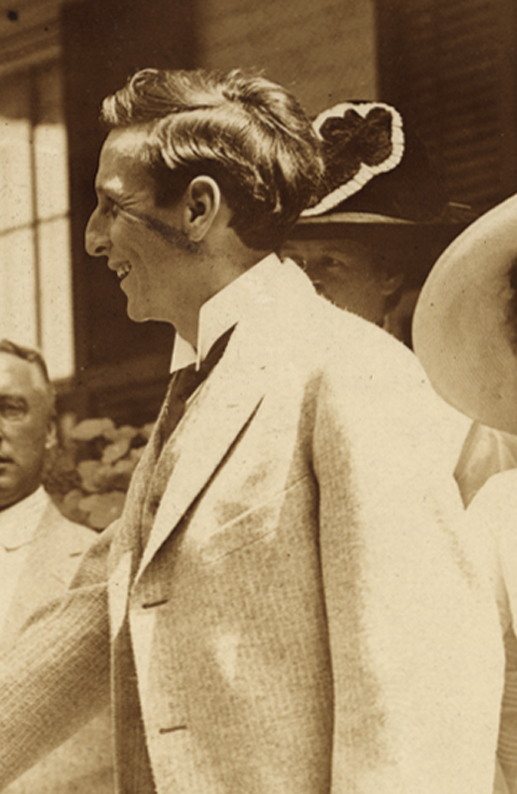
- Born: Cincinnati, Ohio, U.S.
- Occupation: superintendent

Moses Friedman (born 1874) was a superintendent of schools. He was the second leader of the Carlisle Indian Industrial School in Carlisle, Pennsylvania.

Friedman was born in Cincinnati. His father was a Jewish immigrant from Germany.

Friedman graduated from the University of Cincinnati in 1894. In late 1913 and early 1914, he was a subject of congressional hearings about "Indian Affairs". Various accusations were made against him including mismanagement and financial improprieties.

== Carlisle Indian Industrial School ==
Friedman served as editor of the school's Indian Craftsman publication.

Friedman married the daughter of Baptist minister Green Clay Smith and converted from Judaism to Christianity.

Pop Warner was the football coach at the school while Friedman was superintendent. Jim Thorpe was one of the school's star athletes and won Olympic glory before controversy ensued over his involvement in a professional summer baseball league that caused his amateur status to be revoked and his medals to be stripped. Friedman claimed no knowledge of his participation in pro leagues and expressed dismay over the scandal saying it tarnished the school's reputation.

Friedman advocated for "Indians" to be trained in vocational trades and as artisans.

After departing Carlisle he became superintendent of the Anchor Ranch School for Defective Boys in Valdez, New Mexico and then in 1921 became head of a vocational school in Pocono Pines, Pennsylvania.
