= Carlisle Indian Industrial School =

- U.S. National Register of Historic Places
- U.S. National Historic Landmark
- U.S. National Monument
- Pennsylvania state historical marker
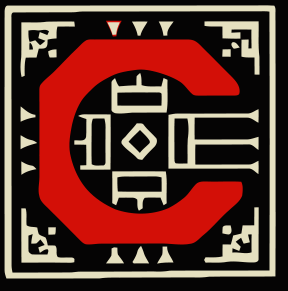
- The Carlisle Indian School logo

- Location within Pennsylvania Location within the United States
- Location: 122 Forbes Ave; Carlisle, Pennsylvania, U.S.
- Coordinates: 40.209°N 77.178°W
- Area: 24.5 acres (9.9 ha)
- Built: 1757 and after
- Architectural style: Colonial Revival
- Website: Official website
- NRHP reference No.: 66000658

Significant dates
- Added to NRHP: October 15, 1966
- Designated NHL: July 4, 1961
- Designated NMON: December 9, 2024
- Designated PHMC: August 31, 2003

The United States Indian Industrial School in Carlisle, Pennsylvania, generally known as Carlisle Indian Industrial School, was the flagship Indian boarding school in the United States from its founding in 1879 to 1918. It was based in the historic Carlisle Barracks, which was transferred to the Department of Interior from the War Department for the purpose of establishing the school. Throughout its history, over 7,800 children from 140 Native American tribes were enrolled at the school. After the United States entered World War I, the school was closed, and the property was transferred back for use by the U.S. Department of Defense. The property is now part of the U.S. Army War College.

In December 2024, it was designated a national monument by President Joe Biden called the Carlisle Federal Indian Boarding School National Monument and co-managed by the Army and the National Park Service in consultation with Native American tribes.

== History ==
=== 19th century ===
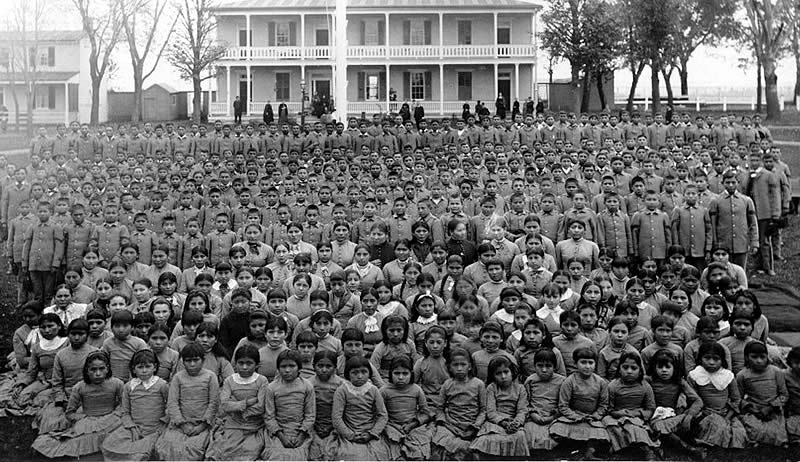
Between 1879 and 1918, over 10,000 Native American students from 140 tribes attended Carlisle Indian Industrial School.

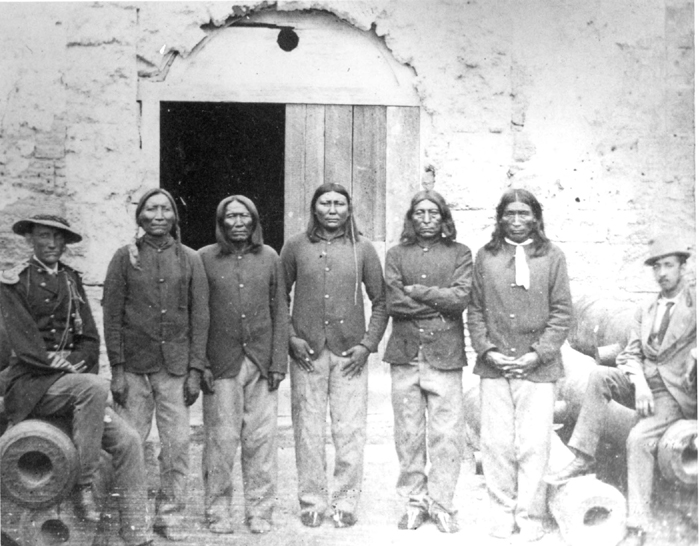
Lieutenant Pratt and Southern Plains veterans of the Red River War at Fort Marion in St. Augustine, Florida in 1875. Several of these veterans later attended Carlisle Industrial School

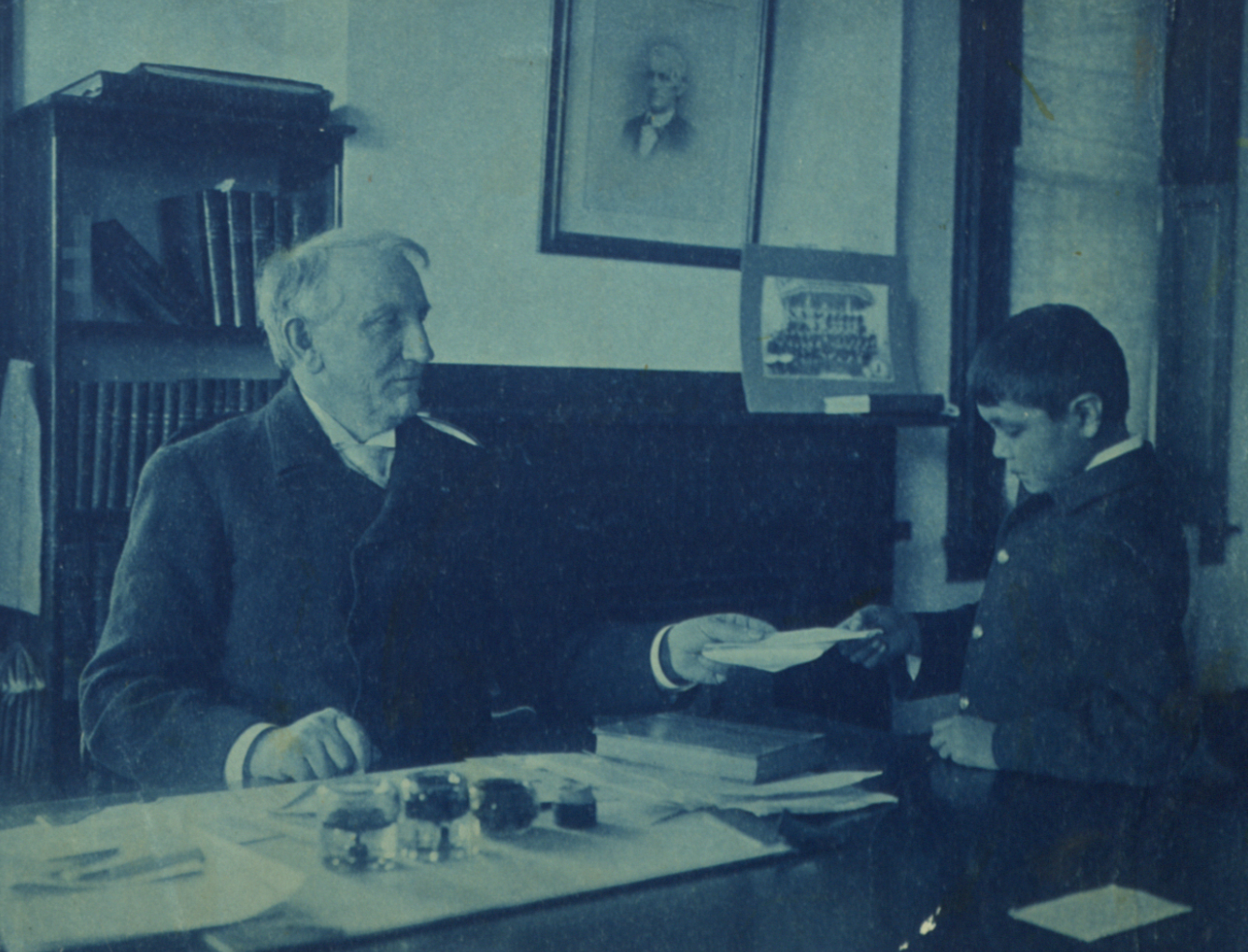
Richard Henry Pratt with a young student

Founded in 1879 by Lieutenant Richard Henry Pratt under U.S. government authorization, Carlisle Indian Industrial School was an early federally funded off-reservation Indian boarding school initiated by the U.S. government. The Choctaw Academy in Scott County, Kentucky, was the first such boarding school, but it was initiated by Choctaw leaders and then funded by the U.S. government through the 1819 Civilization Fund Act.

Pratt had earlier supervised Native American prisoners of war, and supported some of them in gaining education at Hampton College. He became convinced that education was the key to assimilation. In his own words, Pratt's motto was, "Kill the Indian, save the man." The US applied this principle to the cultural assimilation efforts of the larger American Indian boarding school system, by requiring children to speak only English, practice Christianity, take on new names and wear European-American style clothing.

Pratt wrote that he believed that Native Americans were 'equal' to European Americans, and that the school worked to immerse students into mainstream Euro-American culture. He believed that this would enable them to advance and thrive in the dominant society, and be leaders to their people.

After the government assessed the initial success of older Indian students at Hampton Normal and Agricultural School and some in Upstate New York, who were former prisoners of war, Pratt was authorized to establish the first all-Indian school, and founded the Carlisle Indian Industrial School at the historic Carlisle Barracks in central Pennsylvania, and the property was transferred from the War Department to the U.S. Department of the Interior for this purpose.

As at Hampton, arriving students were shorn of their long hair, and even their names were changed. However, "unlike Hampton, whose purpose was to return assimilated educated Indians to their people, Carlisle meant to turn the school into the ultimate Americanizer". At Carlisle, Pratt established a highly structured, quasi-military regime. He was known to use corporal punishment, which was not uncommon in society at the time, on students.

Carlisle emerged as the model for 26 off-reservation Bureau of Indian Affairs boarding schools that were ultimately developed in 15 states and territories. Some private boarding schools were sponsored by religious denominations. In addition, the government operated a total of more than 300 schools on reservations, many of which accepted boarding students from other tribes.

At Fort Marion, Florida in the 1870s, Pratt was assigned to supervise former warriors, several dozen Native American prisoners selected from among those who had surrendered in the Indian Territory at the end of the Red River War. He gradually introduced them to classes in the English language, art, guard duty, and craftsmanship. The program became well known. Distinguished visitors began to visit from all over the country, especially as St. Augustine had become a winter resort for the wealthy.

The U.S. Commissioner of Education came to see firsthand what Pratt was doing, as did the president of Amherst College. Pratt's Fort Marion program convinced him that "distant education" was the only way to totally assimilate the Indian. He wrote, the Indian "is born a blank, like all the rest of us. Transfer the savage born infant to the surroundings of a civilization and he will grow to possess a civilized language and habit."

Pratt wrote:

If all men are created equal, then why were blacks segregated in separate regiments and Indians segregated on separate tribal reservations? Why weren't all men given equal opportunities and allowed to assume their rightful place in society? Race became a meaningless abstraction in his mind.

Pratt believed an industrial school model similar to the Hampton Institute would be useful for educating and assimilating Native Americans.

Give me three hundred young Indians and a place in one of our best communities, and let me prove it! Carlisle Barracks in Pennsylvania, has been abandoned for a number of years. It is in the heart of fine agricultural country. The people are kindly disposed, and long free from the universal border prejudice against Indians.

— Pratt

Pratt and his supporters successfully lobbied Congress to establish the off-reservation boarding school for Native Americans at the historic Carlisle Barracks in Carlisle, Pennsylvania.

By October 1879, Pratt had recruited the first students for the Carlisle Indian Industrial School; 82 boys and girls arrived one night at midnight at the railroad station. They were met by hundreds of local residents who escorted them to the "Old Barracks". The Carlisle Indian School formally opened on November 1, 1879, with an enrollment of 147 students. The youngest was six and the eldest twenty-five, but the majority were teenagers.

Two-thirds were children of leaders of the Plains Indian tribes, with whom the U.S. had recently been at war. The first class was made up of 84 Lakota, 52 Cheyenne, Kiowa and Pawnee, and 11 Apache. The class included a group of students, former prisoners from Fort Marion, who wanted to continue their education with Pratt at Carlisle.

Pratt believed Native Americans were the equal of whites, and founded Carlisle to immerse their children in white culture and teach them English, new skills and customs, in order to help them survive. After the end of Great Sioux War in 1877, the Lakota people were impoverished, harassed and confined to reservations ... many believed that Native Americans were a vanishing race whose only hope for survival was rapid cultural transformation. Thus the U.S. government urgently sought a 'progressive' educational model to quickly assimilate Indians into white culture. Whether this could be achieved and how rapidly it could be done was unknown. Pratt believed he could make use of the Carlisle facility. He thought its proximity to officials in Washington, D.C. would help him educate officials about the Indian capacity for learning.

As part of Pratt's curriculum in cultural and language immersion, the school's students were expected to learn English. School officials also required students to take new English names, either by choice or assignment. This was confusing, as the names from which they had to choose had no meaning for them. Luther Standing Bear (Sicangu-Oglala) was one of the first students when Carlisle began operations in 1879. He was asked to choose a name from a list on the wall. He randomly pointed at the symbols on a wall, and was renamed as Luther. The school assigned his father's name, Standing Bear, as his surname.

The children were forced to change their manner of dress and to give up their traditional tribal ways. The boys all had long hair, which was a strong tradition in their cultures: it was cut short in Euro-American style. Students were required to wear school uniforms of American-style clothing, and girls were provided with uniform dresses.

Standing Bear later wrote of this period:

The civilizing process at Carlisle began with clothes. Whites believed the Indian children could not be civilized while wearing moccasins and blankets. Their hair was cut because in some mysterious way long hair stood in the path of our development. They were issued the clothes of white men. High collar stiff-bosomed shirts and suspenders fully three inches in width were uncomfortable. White leather boots caused actual suffering.

Standing Bear said that red flannel underwear caused "actual torture". He remembered the red flannel underwear as "the worst thing about life at Carlisle".

Some children arrived at Carlisle able to speak some English; they were used by school officials as translators for other students. Officials sometimes took advantage of the children's traditional respect for elders to get them to inform on peers' misbehaviors. This was consistent with accepted practice in the large European-American families of the time, where older children were often required to care for and discipline their younger siblings.

School discipline was strict and consistent, according to the military tradition. Students faced 'courts-martial' for serious cases. Elaine Goodale Eastman, who had supervised government Indian education on reservations west of the Missouri River, later wrote of Carlisle that organizing Indian boys into squads and companies appealed to their warrior traditions. She believed they complied because they wanted to earn officers' ranks, recognition, and privileges. She also observed that there was 'genuine affection' between the Captain and the students.

Children who could not adjust at Carlisle eventually returned to their families and homes. Some ran away because of being homesick and unhappy. According to Eastman, several years after one young man ran away, he approached Pratt in the lobby of a New York hotel. He said that he had found a good job, was working hard, and had saved some money. "Hurrah!" the Captain exclaimed. "I wish all my boys would run away!"

=== Student recruitment ===
In November 1878, Pratt was ordered by the War Department to report to the Secretary of the Interior for 'Indian education' duty. He traveled to Dakota Territory to recruit Lakota, Dakota, and Nakota students for the new school. These tribes were selected by Commissioner of Indian Affairs Ezra Hayt, because they had resisted ceding more territory to the United States government. It was less than three years after Lakota warriors and their allies had defeated Custer and the U.S. 7th Cavalry Regiment at the Little Big Horn.

The War Department ordered Pratt to go to Red Cloud (Oglala) and Spotted Tail (Sicangu), to compel the chiefs to surrender their children. The government believed that by removing the Lakota, Dakota, and Nakota children from their homes, the US would have leverage against the tribes in their continuing attempt to acquire tribal land. Pratt said that, "The children would be hostages for the good behavior of the people."

Pratt persuaded tribal elders and chiefs that the reason the "Washichu" (Lakota word for white man, loosely translates to Takes the Fat) had been able to take their land was that the Indians were uneducated. He said that the Natives were disadvantaged by being unable to speak and write English and, if they had that knowledge, they might have been able to protect themselves. Pratt used this speech to convince chief Spotted Tail to send his children to the school. At first he had been reluctant to relinquish his children to the government that had stolen native land and violated their treaties.

Spotted Tail, you are a remarkable man. [...] You are such an able man that you are the principal chief of these thousands of your people. But Spotted Tail, you cannot read or write. You claim that the government has tricked your people and placed the lines of your reservation a long way inside of where it was agreed that they should be. [...] You signed that paper, knowing only what the interpreter told you it said. If anything happened when the paper was being made up that changed its order, if you had been educated and could read and write, you could have known about it and refused to put your name on it. Do you intend to let your children remain in the same condition of ignorance in which you have lived, which will compel them always to meet the whiter man at a great disadvantage through an interpreter, as you have to do? [...] As your friend, Spotted Tail, I urge you to send your children with me to this Carlisle School and I will do everything I can to advance them in intelligence and industry in order that they may come back and help you.

Consent to send students to Carlisle was often gained with concessions, such as the promise to allow tribal leaders inspect the school soon after it opened.

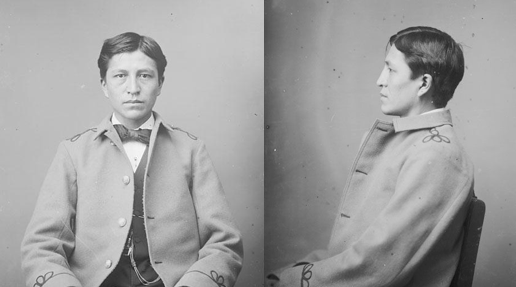
Luther Standing Bear (Oglala Lakota) at Carlisle Indian School, c. 1879

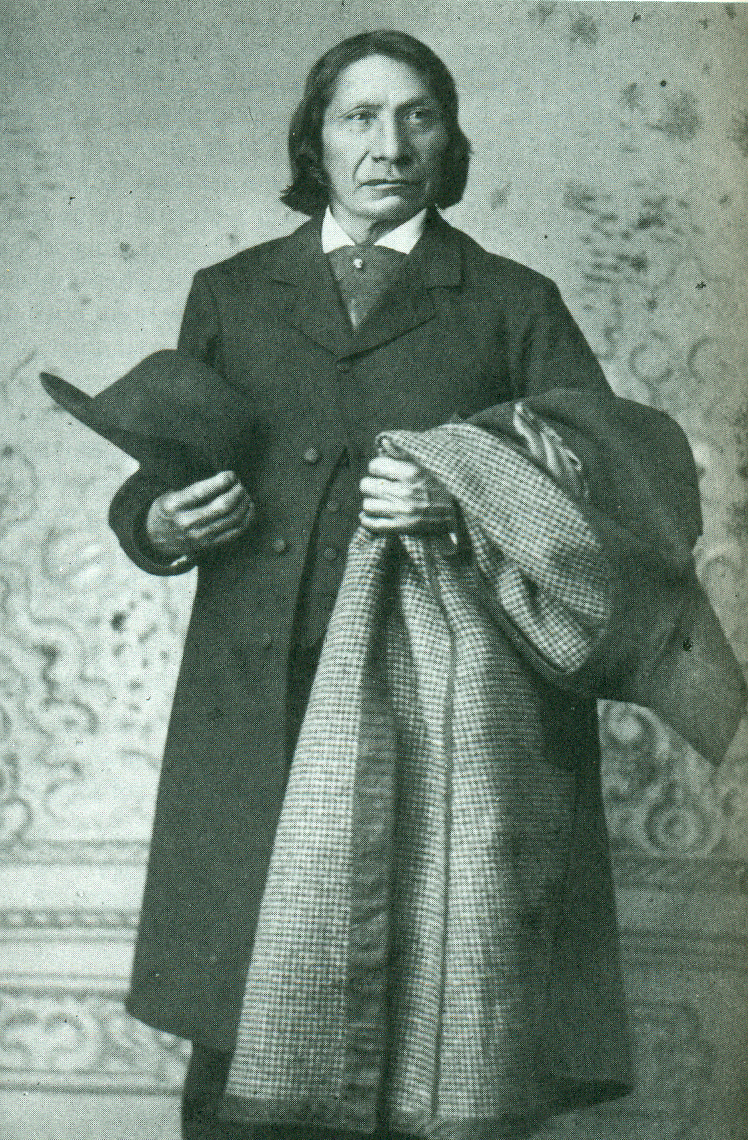
Chief Red Cloud (Oglala Lakota), at Carlisle, June 1880

The first group of inspectors, some 40 Lakota, Dakota, and Nakota chiefs representing nine Missouri River agencies, visited Carlisle in June 1880. Other tribal leaders followed. Before tribal delegations returned home, they usually spent a few days in Washington where they received the plaudits of government officials for allowing their children to participate in the Carlisle experiment.

Some tribes initially consented to sending their children to off-reservation boarding schools, but many were skeptical of the school system and its intentions. Many tribes did not believe the promises of the schools, as they were scarred by the genocidal tactics of the U.S. government. Once students were in school, communication with home was virtually cut off. Letters from parents were left unsent by Indian Agents, and parents were not notified promptly when their children were ill or even after they died.

Although the Civilization Fund Act of 1819 required parental consent for children to be sent to off-reservation boarding schools, in practice children were regularly forcibly removed. US officials justified the practice of forceful removal because they believed that native parenting practices were seen as inferior to mainstream white parenting. John S. Ward, a US Indian Agent, said that "The parents of these Indian children are ignorant, and know nothing of the value of education... Parental authority is hardly known or exercised among the Indians in this agency. The agent should be endowed with some kind of authority to enforce attendance. The agent here has found that a threat to depose a captain if he does not make the children attend school has had a good effect."

Ward reiterated the US government's self-appointed position as a patriarchal ward over natives. Government officials treated tribal nations as dependents, and acted as if they could justifiably force a childlike nation to do what was best for them. The US officially legalized the denial of native parental rights in 1891, leading to mass forced removal of native children from their families. It was not until the 1976 Indian Child Welfare Act that this practice was ended.

=== American Horse ===
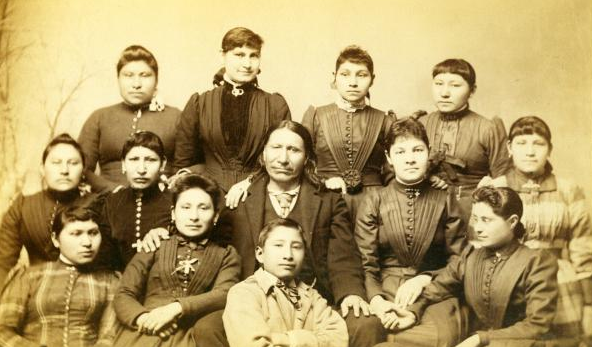
American Horse at Carlisle, 1882, with his daughter Maggie Stands Looking with other Indian students and teachers. Maggie Stands Looking was one of Captain Pratt's model students.

Oglala Lakota Chief American Horse was one of the earliest advocates of 'western' (Euro-immigrant) education for Native Americans. While recruiting at Pine Ridge Reservation, Pratt had met strong opposition from Chief Red Cloud. He distrusted white education but had no school-age children.

American Horse "took a lively interest" in what Pratt had to say. He was a tribal leader and head of a large household with at least ten children. He believed that his children would have to deal with whites, and perhaps live with them, whether they liked it or not. He decided to send two sons and a daughter for the first class at Carlisle in 1879.

=== Model U.S. Indian Boarding School ===
Pratt was so successful in his correspondence and methods that many Western chiefs, whose people were suffering from cold and hunger on their reservations, begged him to bring more children East. The chiefs also wrote to Washington with a request to educate more of their children.

News of the educational experiment spread rapidly, and many whites went to Carlisle to volunteer services and professional talents. Pratt developed a photographic record of the school for publicity and documentation. The institution and the school were photographed during the school's existence by approximately a dozen professional photographers. The first and best known photographer of the Carlisle Indian School was John Nicolas Choate. After Indian dress was replaced with military uniforms and the children's hair was cut in Anglo fashion, the Indians' physical appearance was transformed. In an effort to convince doubters of the transformation possible, Pratt hired photographers to present this evidence. Before and after "contrast" photos were sent to officials in Washington, friends of the new school, and back to reservations to recruit new students.

The minimum age for students was fourteen, and all students were required to be at least one-fourth Indian. The Carlisle term was five years, and the consent forms which the parents signed before the agent so stated. Pratt refused to return pupils earlier unless they were ill, unsuitable mentally, or a menace to others.

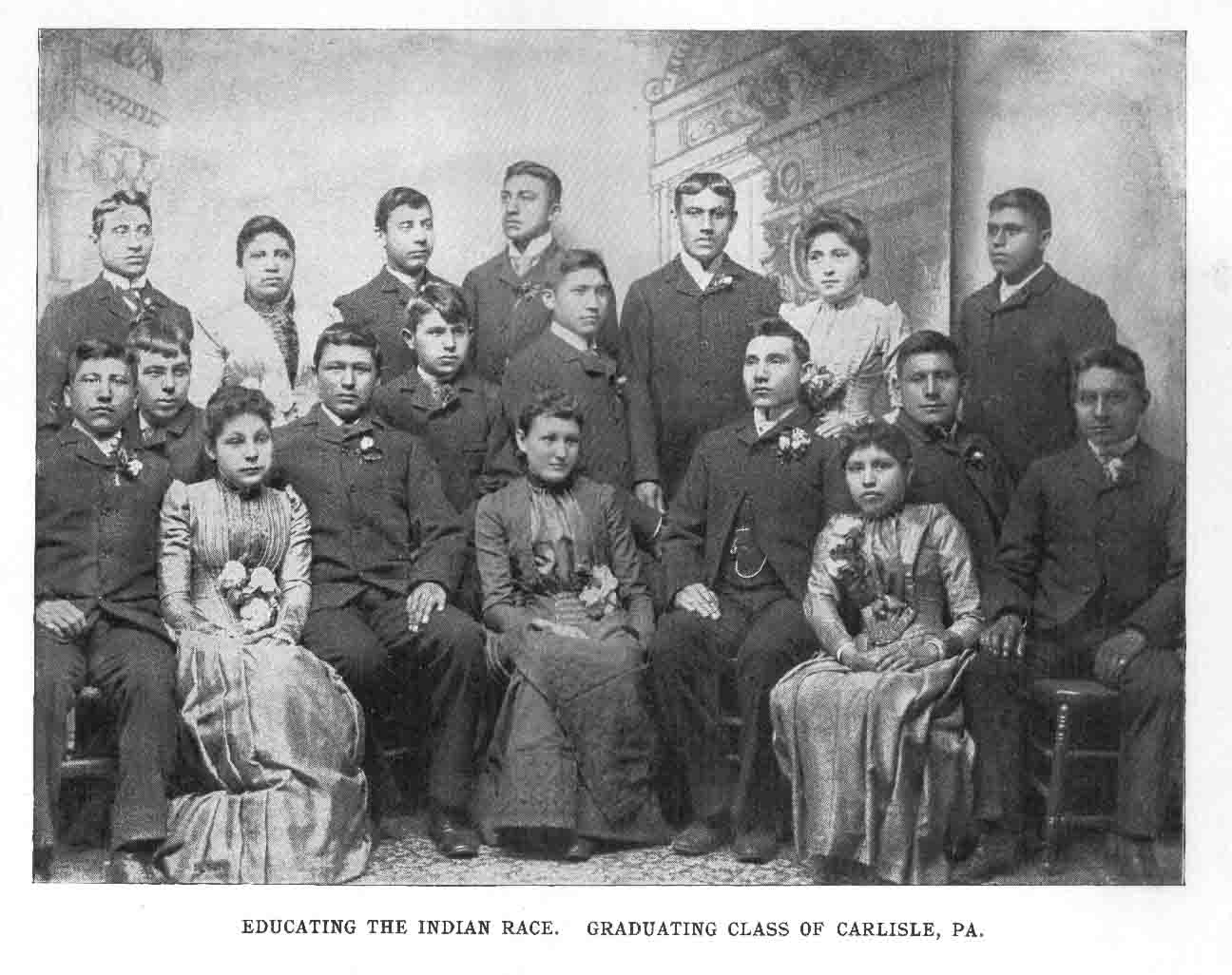
Between 1899 and 1904, Carlisle issued thirty to forty-five degrees a year. "Educating the Indian Race. Graduating Class of Carlisle, PA." ca. 1890s

Between 1899 and 1904, Carlisle issued thirty to forty-five degrees a year. In 1905, a survey of 296 Carlisle graduates showed that 124 had entered government service (often with reservation agencies), and 47 were employed off the reservations.

Anniversaries and other school events attracted whites of distinction. US senators, Indian commissioners, secretaries of the Interior, college presidents, and noted clergymen were among those invited to present the diplomas or address the graduating class upon these occasions. The gymnasium held 3,000 persons and was generally filled with an audience of townspeople and distinguished visitors showing their support for aspiring Carlisle students.

== Community ==
=== Carlisle, Pennsylvania ===
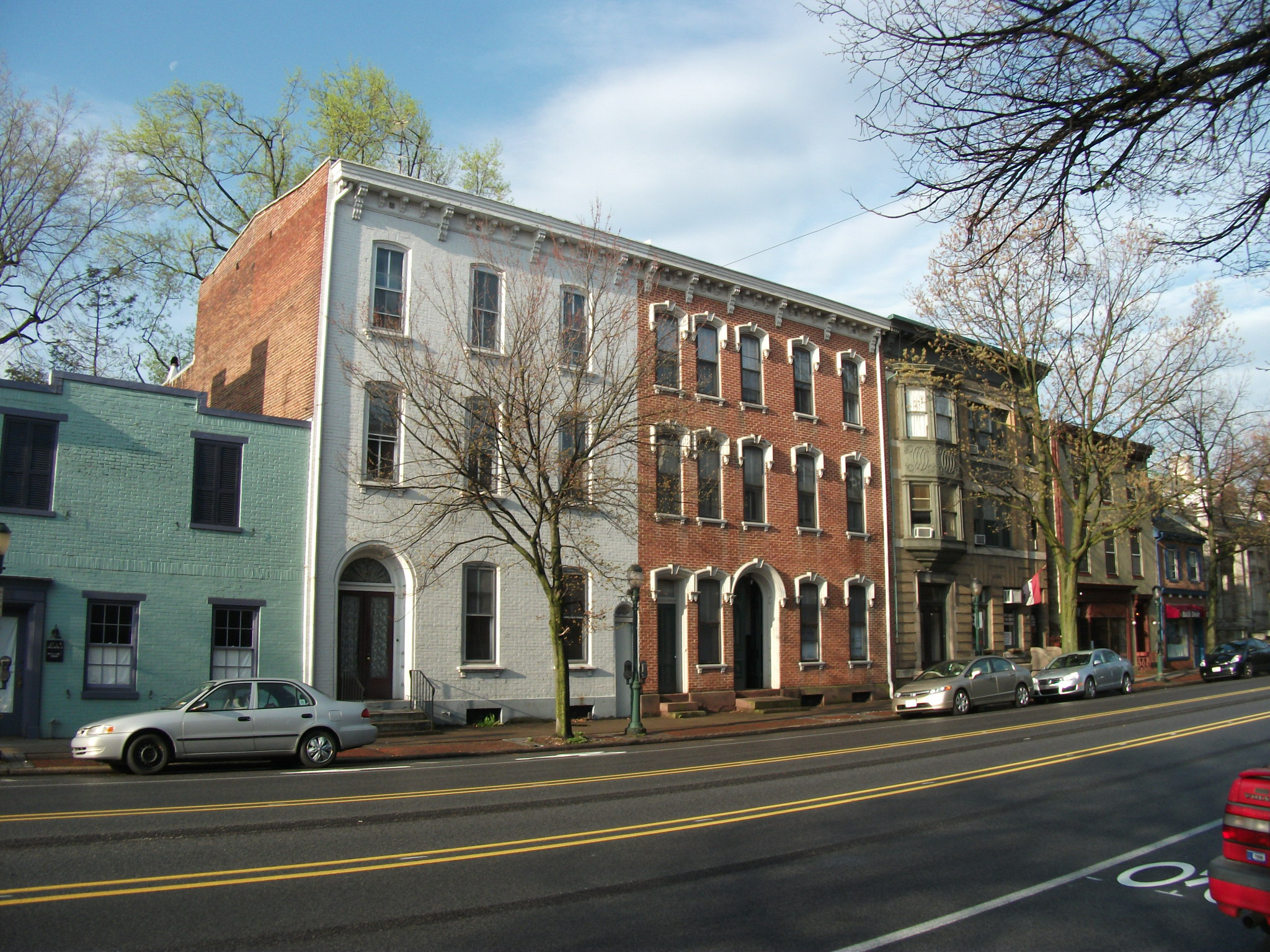
The people of Carlisle, Pennsylvania, signed a petition in favor of the proposed school

In 1880, Carlisle, Pennsylvania, was a thriving town as a borough and county seat of Cumberland County, west of the Susquehanna River, with a population of 6,209 people. The shoe factory in town employed over 800 residents. There were two railroads, three banks and ten hotels in Carlisle by the time Pratt established his school. By the late 19th century, there were 1,117 "colored residents" in Carlisle. Carlisle boasted a low unemployment rate and a high literacy rate at the time of the census. It was considered a good location, as it was not in a big city. It was not so far West that the students would be able to run away back to their families.

The historic Carlisle Barracks, established in 1757, afterwards the site of the U.S. Army War College, and the U.S. Army Heritage and Education Center, was vacant and available for use. The military site was less than two miles from an already well established educational institution, Dickinson College, founded in 1773. When the first Indian School students arrived in Carlisle on October 6, 1879, they were in tribal dress. "For the people of Carlisle it was a gala day and a great crowd gathered around the railroad. The older Indian boys sang songs aloud in order to keep their spirits up and remain courageous, even though they were frightened."

"For years, it was a common event for the people of Carlisle to greet the Carlisle Indian football victors on their homecoming. Led by the Indian School Band, the Carlisle Indians paraded in their nightshirts down the streets of Carlisle and on to the school on the edge of town." Residents of Carlisle stood on their doorsteps and cheered as the Carlisle Band led a snake dance from one end of town to the other.

=== Dickinson College ===
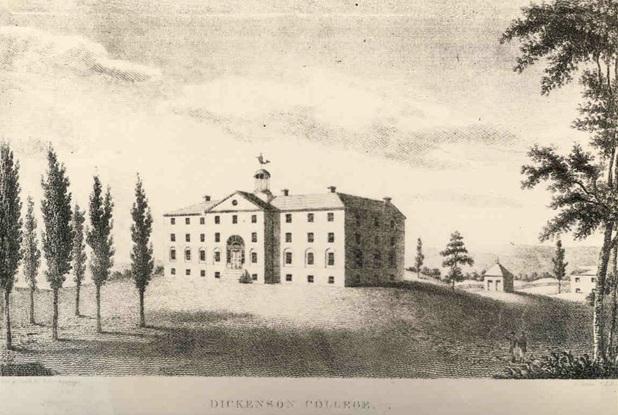
The collaborative effort between Dickinson College and Carlisle Indian School lasted almost four decades, from the opening day to the closing of the school. Old West, Dickinson College, 1810

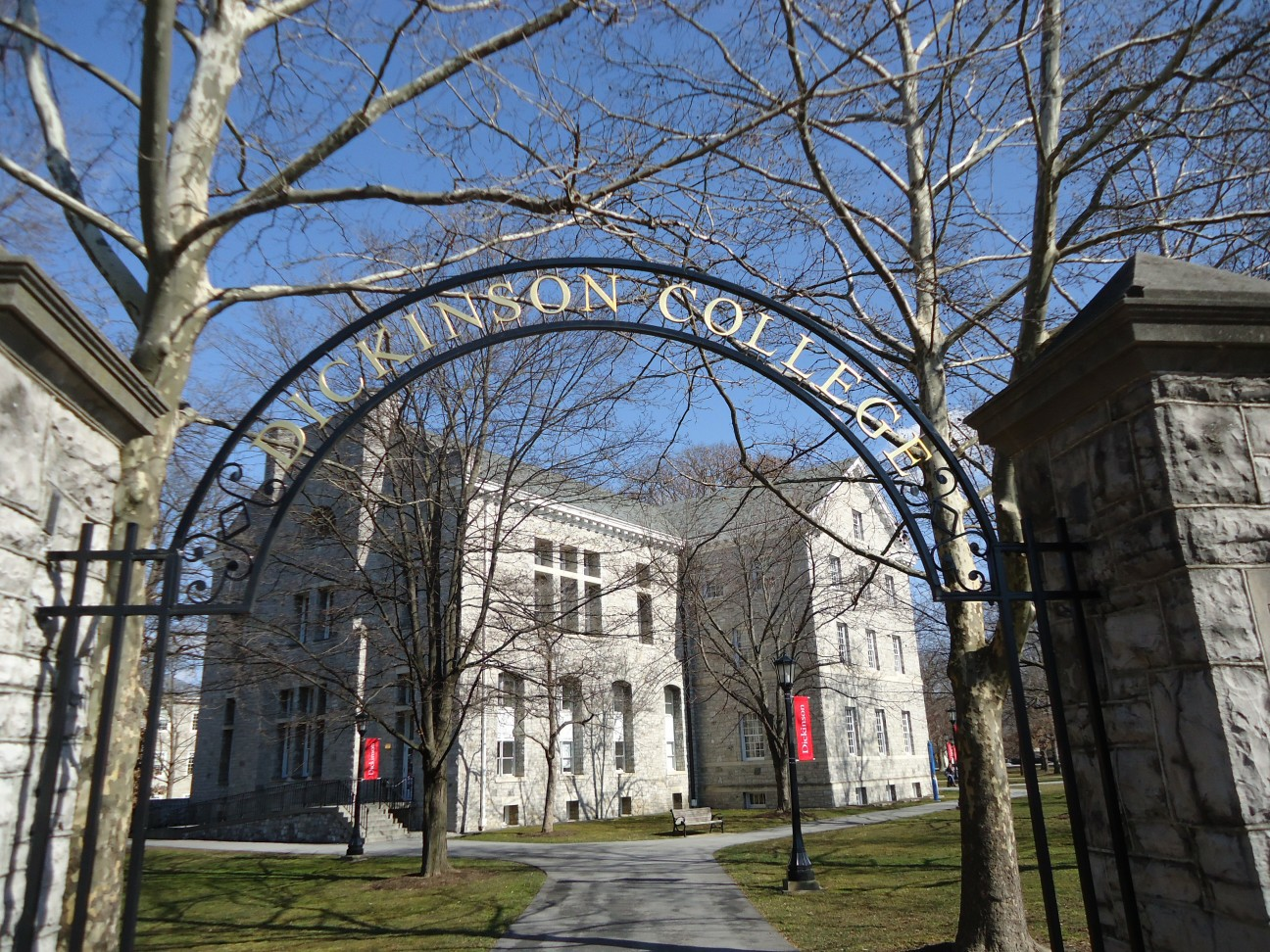
Dickinson College provided Carlisle Indian Industrial School students with access to preparatory and college level education, and Dickinson professors served as chaplains and special faculty to the Indian School.

Carlisle was also home to Dickinson College, less than two miles from the Carlisle Indian School, America's 16th oldest college. Dickinson College and the Carlisle Indian School collaboration began when Dr. James Andrew McCauley, President of Dickinson College, led the first worship service at the Indian School in 1879. It was Mrs. Pratt who had initiated the contact between the Indian School and Dickinson. Upon Pratt's absence one Sunday, Mrs. Pratt wrote to President McCauley and requested his aid as a minister which he graciously accepted. The relationship did not stop there with Richard Pratt noting that, "from that time forward Dr. McCauley became an advisor and most valued friend to the school.".

The collaborative effort between Dickinson College and the Carlisle Indian School lasted almost four decades, from the opening day to the closing of the school. Dr. McCauley helped Pratt to develop a board of trustees and a Board of Visitors composed of different heads of leading national educational institutions and wealthy donors. Dickinson College professors served as chaplains and special faculty to the Indian School, and college students volunteered services, observed teaching methods and participated in events.

Dickinson College also provided Carlisle Indian School students with access to the Dickinson Preparatory School (Conway Hall) and college level education. Thomas P. Marshall, a Sioux from Pine Ridge agency, South Dakota, was one of the first Native American students at Dickinson. He was laid to rest at the Carlisle Indian Industrial School cemetery. Carlisle is home to the Dickinson School of Law, now part of The Pennsylvania State University. In the early 1900s a few Carlisle Indian School graduates attended the law school: Albert A. Exendine, Ernest Robitaille, Hastings M. Robertson, Victor M. Kelley, and William J. Gardner.

In 1889, Dr. George Edward Reed assumed the position of President of Dickinson College and continued the close relationship between the Indian School and Dickinson College through Pratt's departure in 1904. Reed told an audience at the Indian School that "we who live in Carlisle, who come in constant contact with the Indian School, and who know of its work, have occasion to be agreeably surprised with the advance we are able to see." In June 1911, Reed addressed the one hundred and twenty-eighth commencement of Dickinson College, where he presented an Honorary Degree of Master of Arts to Pratt's successor, Superintendent Moses Friedman, for his work at the Carlisle Indian School.

Prof. Charles Francis Himes was a professor of natural science at Dickinson College for three decades and instrumental in expanding the science curriculum. Professor Hines took an interest in the Carlisle Indian School and his notable lectures on electricity ("Why Does It Burn"), "Lightning" and "Gunpowder" received a favorable reaction from parents and students. Himes lectured to Chiefs Red Cloud, Roman Nose and Yellow Tail, and brought Indian students to the Dickinson laboratory to give lectures. Himes also promoted Carlisle's success in national academic circles.

Luther Standing Bear recalled that one day an astronomer came to Carlisle and gave a talk. "The astronomer explained that there would be an eclipse of the moon the following Wednesday night at twelve o'clock. We did not believe it. When the moon eclipsed, we readily believed our teacher about geography and astronomy."

In addition to academic contact, the two institutes had contact in the public venue as well. The best known instances include the regular defeats of Dickinson College by the Carlisle Indian School football team and other athletic competitions.

== Curricula and extracurricular programs ==
Carlisle curricula included subjects such as English, math, history, drawing and composition. Students also learned trade and work skills such as farming and manufacturing. Older students used their skills to help build new classrooms and dormitories. Carlisle students produced a variety of weekly and monthly newspapers and other publications that were considered part of their "industrial training," or preparing for work in the larger economy. Marianne Moore was a teacher at Carlisle before she became one of America's leading poets. Music was a part of the program, and many students studied classical instruments. The Carlisle Indian Band earned an international reputation.

Native American teachers eventually joined the faculty, such as Ho-Chunk artist Angel DeCora, taught students about Native American art and heritage and fought harsh assimilation methods. Students were instructed in Christianity and expected to attend a local church, but had their choice among those in town. Carlisle students were required to attend a daily service and two services on Sundays. Students were expected to participate in various extracurricular activities. In addition to the YMCA and King's Daughters Circle, the girls could choose between the Mercer Literary Society and the Susan Longstreth Society. The boys had a choice of the Standard Literary Society or the Invincible Debating Society.

A summer camp was established in the mountains at Pine Grove Furnace State Park, near a place called Tagg's Run. Students lived in tents and picked berries, hunted and fished. Luther Standing Bear recalled: "In 1881, after the school closed for the summer vacation, some of the boys and girls were placed out in farmers' homes to work throughout the summer. Those who remained at school were sent to the mountains for a vacation trip. I was among the number. When we reached our camping place, we pitched out tents like soldiers all in a row. Captain Pratt brought along a lot of feathers and some sinew, and we made bows and arrows. Many white people came to visit the Indian camp, and seeing us shooting with the bow and arrow, they would put nickels and dimes in a slot of wood and set them up for us to shoot at. If we knocked the money from the stick, it was ours. We enjoyed this sport very much, as it brought a real home thrill to us."

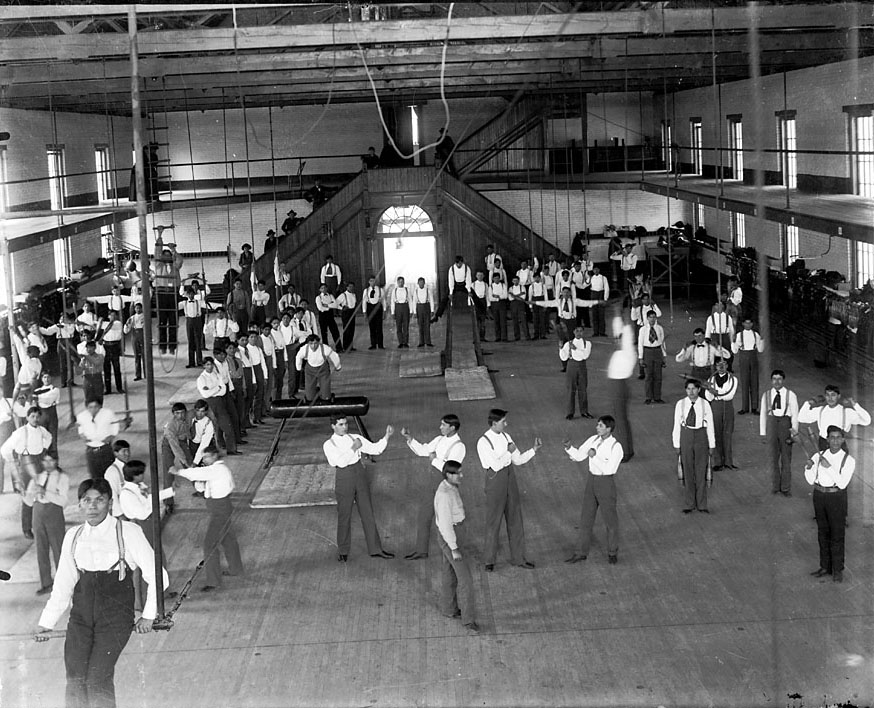
Carlisle Students in School Uniform Exercising Inside Gymnasium; Some with Indian Clubs, Others with Gymnastic Equipment; Non-Native Group Watching, 1879

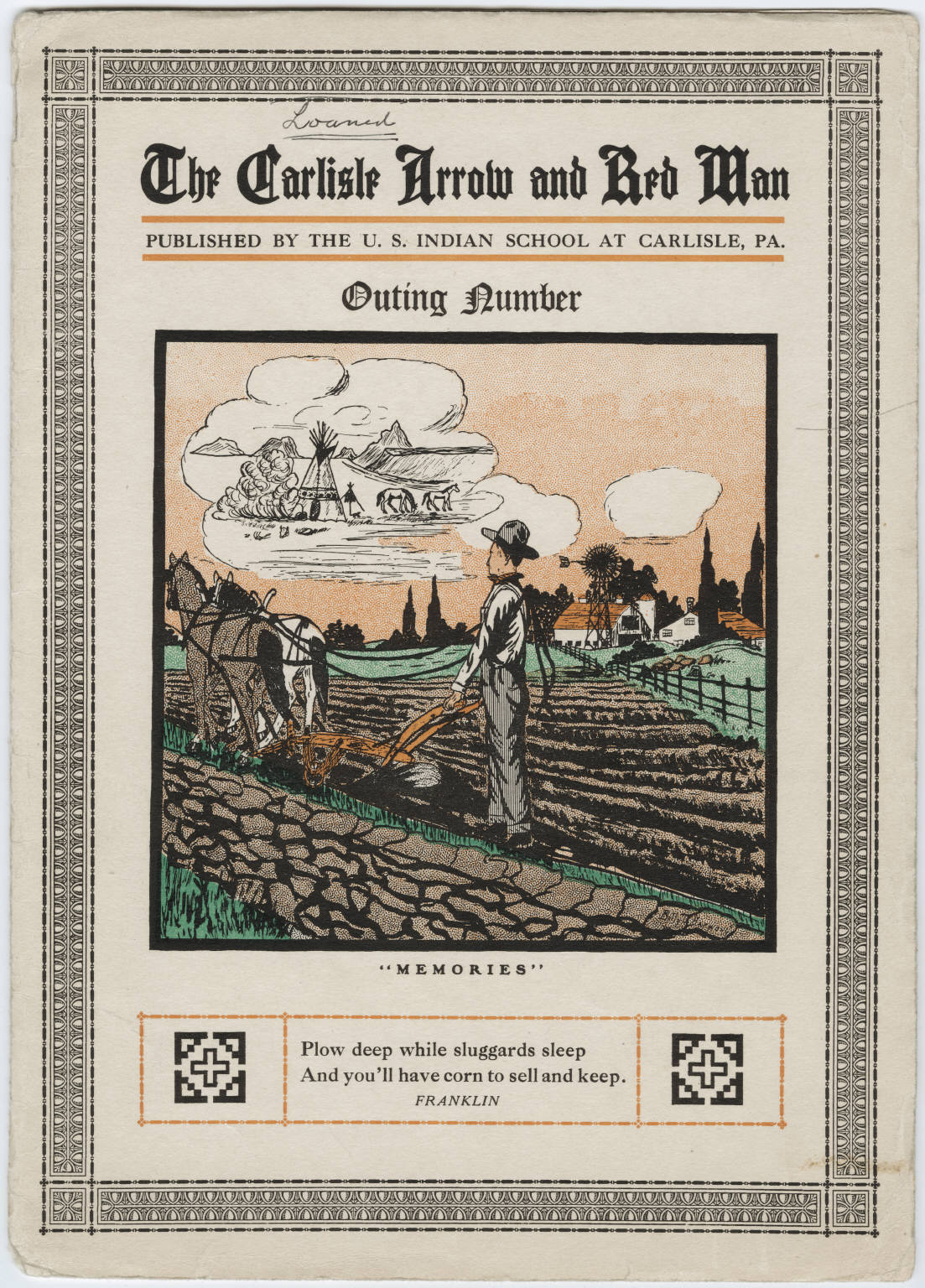
The Carlisle Arrow and Red Man, school publication

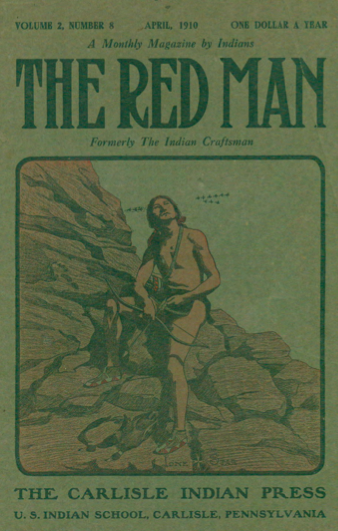
The Red Man, The Carlisle Indian Press, 1910

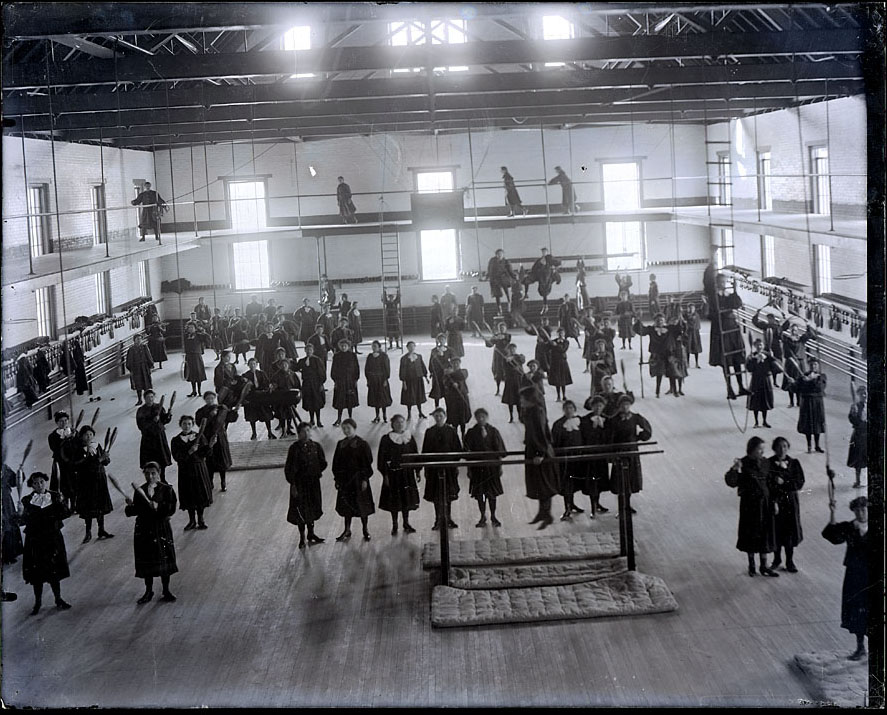
Young women students at gym class, 1880

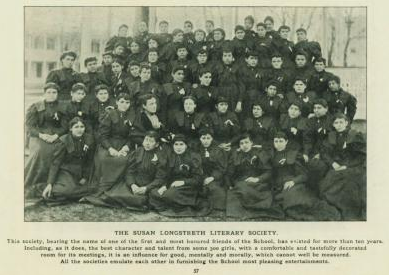
Susan Longstreth Literary Society, 1895

=== Carlisle Summer Outing Program ===
The Carlisle Summer Outing Program arranged for students to work in homes as domestic servants or in farms or businesses during the summer. The program won praise from reformers and administrators alike and helped increase the public's faith that Indians could be educated and assimilated. The program gave students opportunities to interact and live in the white world and found jobs for students during the summer months with middle-class farm families where they earned their first wages. Many students worked in the homes and farms of Quaker families in eastern Pennsylvania and surrounding states. Some were sent to farms in the Pennsylvania Dutch Country of Dauphin, Lancaster, and Lebanon counties and acquired what would be a lifelong Pennsylvania Dutch accent.

Students were required to write home at least every month, and as often as they chose. Nearly all the students lovingly inquired after absent brothers and sisters, and many sent money home ten or twenty dollars of their own earnings.

Maggie Stands Looking, a daughter of Oglala Lakota Chief American Horse, was among the first wave of children brought from Rosebud and one of Captain Pratt's model students. Maggie had difficulty adjusting to the demands of her new lifestyle at Carlisle, and once slapped Miss Hyde, the matron, when Hyde insisted that Maggie make her bed every day and keep her room clean. Instead of retaliating, Miss Hyde stood her ground and Maggie acquiesced. Like most of the Carlisle students, Maggie was enrolled in the Summer Outing Program.

After her arrival to her country home, Maggie wrote a letter to Pratt. "Dear Captain Pratt: What shall I do? I have been here two weeks and I have not bathed. These folks have no bath place. Your school daughter, Maggie Stands Looking." Pratt advised her to do as he had done on the frontier and signed his letter "Your friend and school father. R.H. Pratt." Maggie replied, "After filling a wash basin with water and rubbing myself well, have had a bath that made me feel as good as jumping into a river."

The Outing Program continued throughout the Carlisle's history, and of the thousands who attended Carlisle for the first twenty-four years, a least half participated in the program. Around 1909, Superintendent Friedman expanded the Outing Program by placing boys in manufacturing corporations such as Ford Motor Company. Over sixty of the boys from Carlisle were subsequently hired and worked steadily for Ford. During the later part of World War I, about forty had good jobs in the Hog Island, Philadelphia, shipyards.

=== Student internships ===
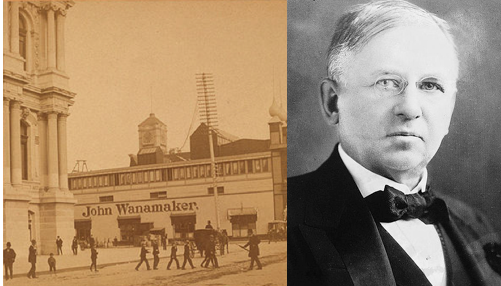
Wanamaker Store, Philadelphia. John Wanamaker told the assembled Carlisle School that he employed as many as one thousand people in his establishment and never promoted anyone as rapidly as Luther Standing Bear. Later, as United States Postmaster General, Wanamaker established a Post Office in Kyle, South Dakota at Luther's request.

In 1883, Luther Standing Bear was sent to Philadelphia to work as an intern for John Wanamaker. Wanamaker's was the first department store in Philadelphia, Pennsylvania, and one of the first department stores in the United States. Luther was told by Pratt: "My boy you are going away from us to work for this school. Go and do your best. The majority of white people think the Indian is a lazy good-for-nothing. They think he can neither work nor learn anything; that he is very dirty. Now you are going to prove that the red man can learn and work as well as the white man. If John Wanamaker gives you the job of blacking his shoes, see that you make them shine. Then he will give you a better job. If you are put into the office to clean, don't forget to sweep up under the chairs and in the corners. If you do this well, he will give you better work to do."

While riding on street cars in Philadelphia, Luther did not care to listen to the vulgar language used by white boys on the way to work. At the end of his internship, the entire Carlisle school students and faculty traveled to a large meeting hall in Philadelphia where Pratt and Wanamaker spoke. Luther was asked to come to the stage, and Wanamaker told the students that Luther had been promoted from one department to another every month getting better work and better money and in spite of the fact that he employed over one thousand people, he never promoted anyone as rapidly as Luther.

=== Carlisle Indians (sports teams) ===
In the early 20th century, the Carlisle Indian School was a national football powerhouse, and regularly competed against other major programs such as the Ivy League schools Harvard, Pennsylvania, Cornell, Dartmouth, Yale, Princeton, and Brown, and Army (West Point) and Navy (Annapolis). Coach Pop Warner led a highly successful football team and athletic program at the Carlisle School, and went on to create other successful collegiate programs. He coached the exceptional athlete Jim Thorpe and his teammates, bringing national recognition to the small school. On November 11, 1905, the Carlisle Indians defeated the U.S. Military Academy at West Point, New York 6-5 in the first meeting of these teams. By 1907, the Carlisle Indians were the most dynamic team in college football. They had pioneered the forward pass, the overhand spiral and other trick plays that frustrated their opponents. The Carlisle Indians have been characterized as the "team that invented football."

In 1911, the Indians posted an 11–1 record, which included one of the greatest upsets in college football history. Legendary athlete Jim Thorpe and coach Pop Warner led the Carlisle Indians to an 18–15 upset of Harvard before 25,000 in Cambridge, Massachusetts. Thorpe scored all the points for Carlisle, a touchdown, extra point and four field goals. During the program's 25 years, the Carlisle Indians compiled a 167–88–13 record and winning percentage (.647), which makes it the most successful defunct major college football program. The Carlisle Indians developed a rivalry with Harvard and loved to sarcastically mimic the Harvard accent. Even players who could barely speak English would drawl the broad Harvard "a" with a Boston accent. Carlisle students labeled any excellent performance, whether on the field or in the classroom, as "Harvard style".

On November 9, 1912, Carlisle was to meet the U.S. Military Academy in a game at West Point, New York, between two of the top teams in the country. Pop Warner spoke to his team: "Your fathers and your grandfathers," Warner began, "are the ones who fought their fathers. These men playing against you today are soldiers. They are the Long Knives. You are Indians. Tonight, we will know if you are warriors." That dramatic evening Carlisle routed Army 27–6. That game, played just 22 years after the last Army battle with the Lakota/Sioux at the Wounded Knee, featured not only Jim Thorpe, but nine future generals including a linebacker named Dwight D. Eisenhower. "It was an exquisitely apt piece of national theater: a contest between Indians and soldiers."

Many Carlisle Indians such Frank Mount Pleasant, Gus Welch, Francis M. Cayou, Joe Guyon, Pete Calac, Bemus Pierce, Hawley Pierce, Frank Hudson, William Jennings Gardner, Martin Wheelock, Jimmy Johnson, Isaac Seneca, Artie Miller, Bill Newashe, Woodchuck Welmas, Ted St. Germaine, Bill Winneshiek, and Albert Exendine became professional athletes, coaches, educators, and community leaders.

Halls of Fame

Seven Carlisle Indians have been enshrined in the College Football Hall of Fame: Albert Exendine (1970), Joe Guyon (1971), James Johnson (1969), Ed Rogers (1968), Jim Thorpe (1951), and Gus Welch (1975) as players, and Lone Star Dietz (2012) as a coach.

Two Carlisle Indians have been enshrined in the Professional Football Hall of Fame: Jim Thorpe (1963) and Joe Guyon (1966).

Two Carlisle Indians were inducted into the Citizens Savings (originally Helms) Athletic Foundation Hall of Fame: Jim Thorpe (1950) and Lone Star Dietz (1976).

Pop Warner was inducted into the College Football and Citizens Savings Halls of Fame in significant part for his work at Carlisle.

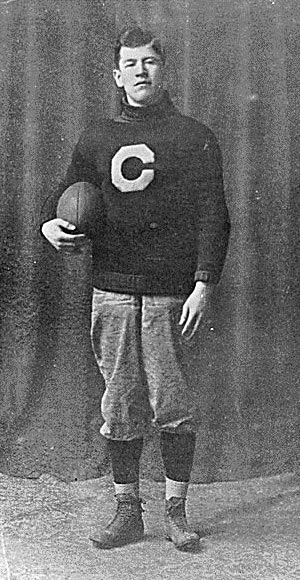
Jim Thorpe in his Carlisle Indians football uniform. c. 1909

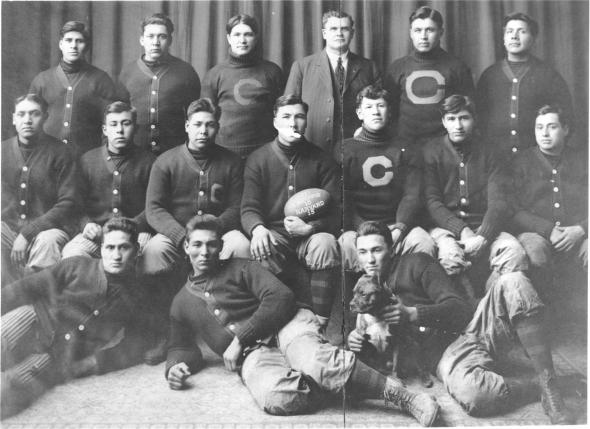
The 1911 Carlisle Indians football team pose with a game ball from the upset of Harvard. Coach "Pop" Warner (standing, third from right) and Jim Thorpe (seated, third from right) are pictured.

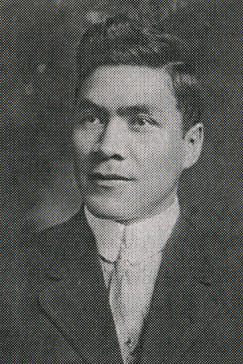
Albert Exendine was a graduate of the Carlisle Indian School and the Dickinson School of Law. c. 1905

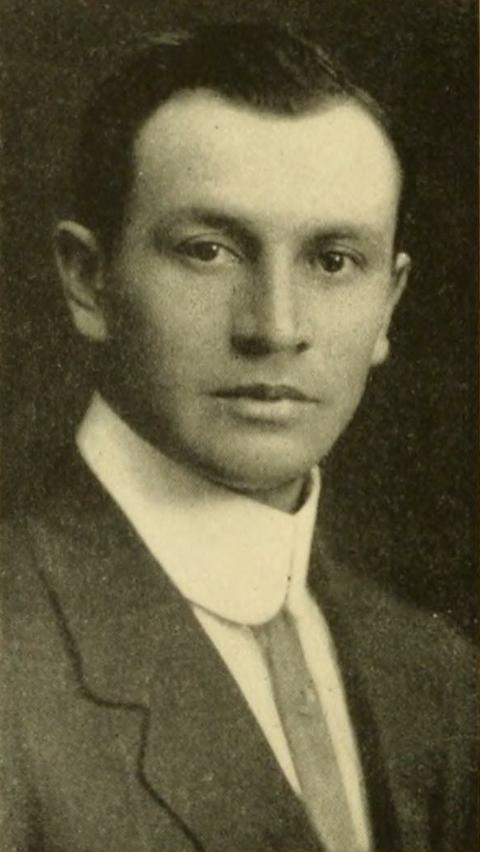
Frank Mount Pleasant was the first Carlisle Indian School student to graduate from Dickinson College, 1912

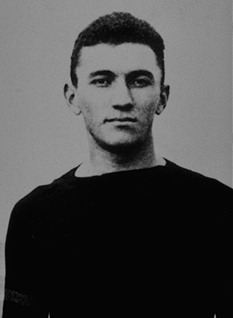
Gus Welch graduated from the Dickinson School of Law and served as a Second Lieutenant under Gen. John J. Pershing in the American Expeditionary Force in World War I

=== Carlisle Indian Band ===
The Carlisle Indian Band earned an international reputation under a talented Oneida musician, Dennison Wheelock, who became noted as its leader, composer and compiler of modified Native airs. Many students studied classical musical instruments. The Carlisle Indian Band performed at world fairs, expositions and every at national presidential inaugural celebration until the school closed. Luther Standing Bear was a bugler for military calls and educated as a classical musician. On May 24, 1883, Luther Standing Bear led the Carlisle Indian band of brass instruments as the first band to cross the Brooklyn Bridge on its grand opening.

From 1897 to 1899, Zitkala-Sa played violin with the New England Conservatory of Music in Boston. In 1899, she took a position at the Carlisle Indian School where she taught music to the children and conducted debates on the treatment of Native Americans. In 1900, Zitkala-Sa played violin at the Paris Exposition with the school's Carlisle Indian Band. In the same year, she began writing articles on Native American life which were published in such popular periodicals as Atlantic Monthly and Harper's Monthly. Also in 1900, Zitkala-Sa was sent by Captain Pratt back to the Yankton Reservation for the first time in several years to recruit students. She was greatly dismayed to find there that her mother's house was in disrepair and her brother's family in poverty, and that white settlers were beginning to occupy the land promised to the Yankton Dakota by the Dawes Act of 1877.

Upon returning to Carlisle, she came into conflict with Pratt. She resented the rigid program of assimilation and argued that the curricula did not encourage Native American children to aspire to anything beyond lives spent in menial labor. In 1901, Zitkala-Sa was dismissed, likely for an article she had published in Harper's Monthly describing the profound loss of identity felt by a Native American boy after being given an assimilationist education at Carlisle. in 1901, concerned with her mother's advanced age and her family's struggles with poverty, she returned to the Yankton Reservation. Zitkala-Sa dedicated her life to Indian reform, voting rights and education.

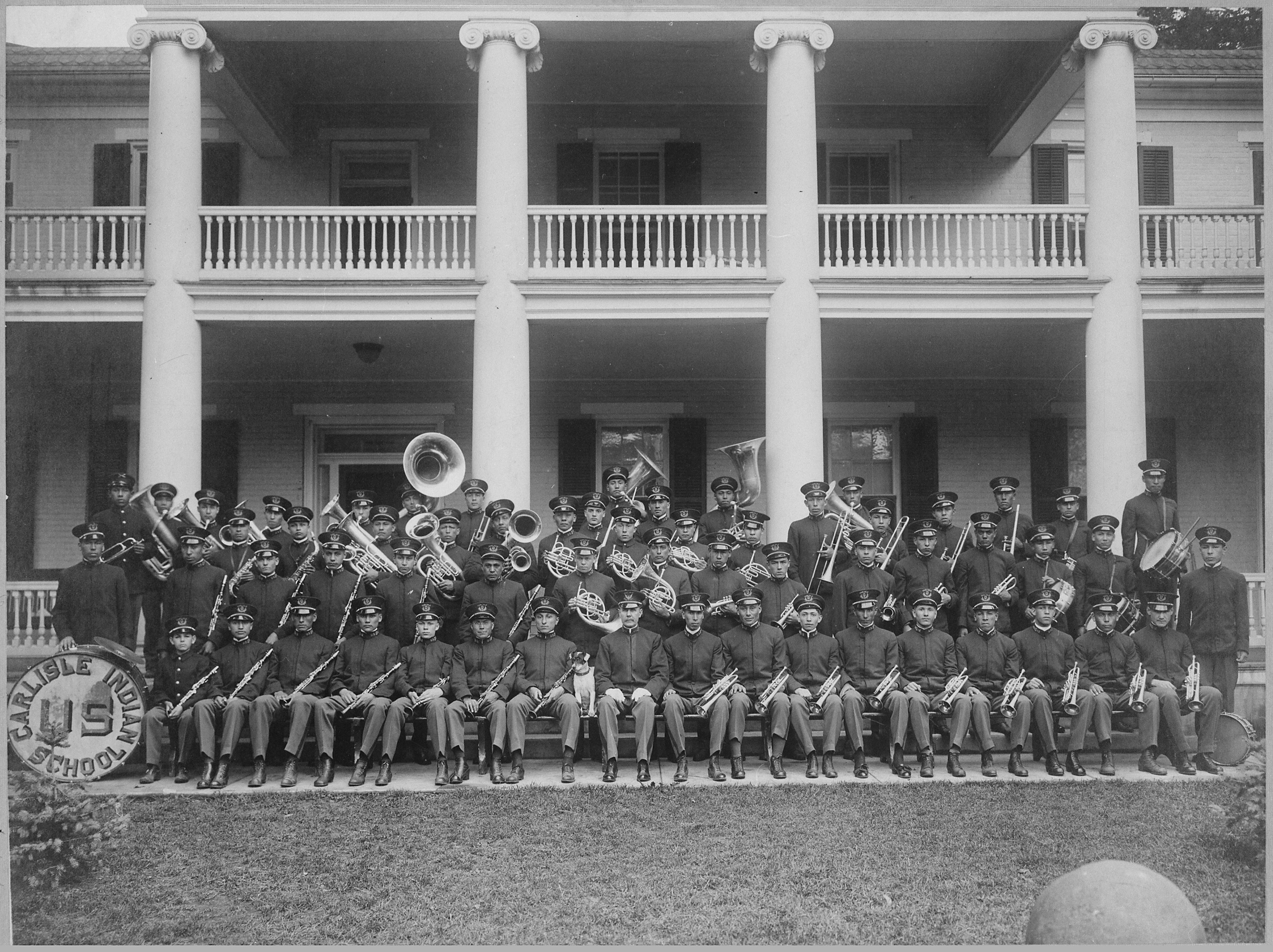
The Carlisle Indian Band performed at world fairs, expositions and at every national presidential inaugural celebration until the school closed - Carlisle, Pennsylvania, 1915

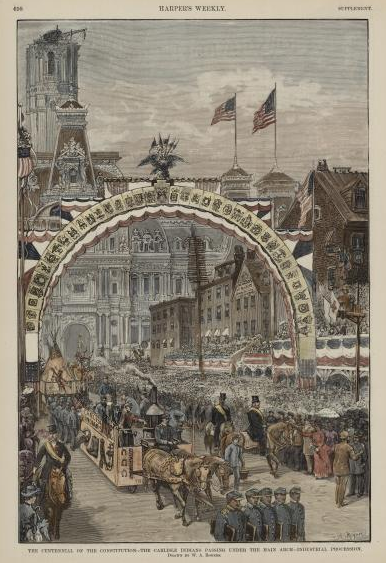
Carlisle Indian Students at the Centennial of the Constitution Parade - Philadelphia, Pennsylvania, 1887

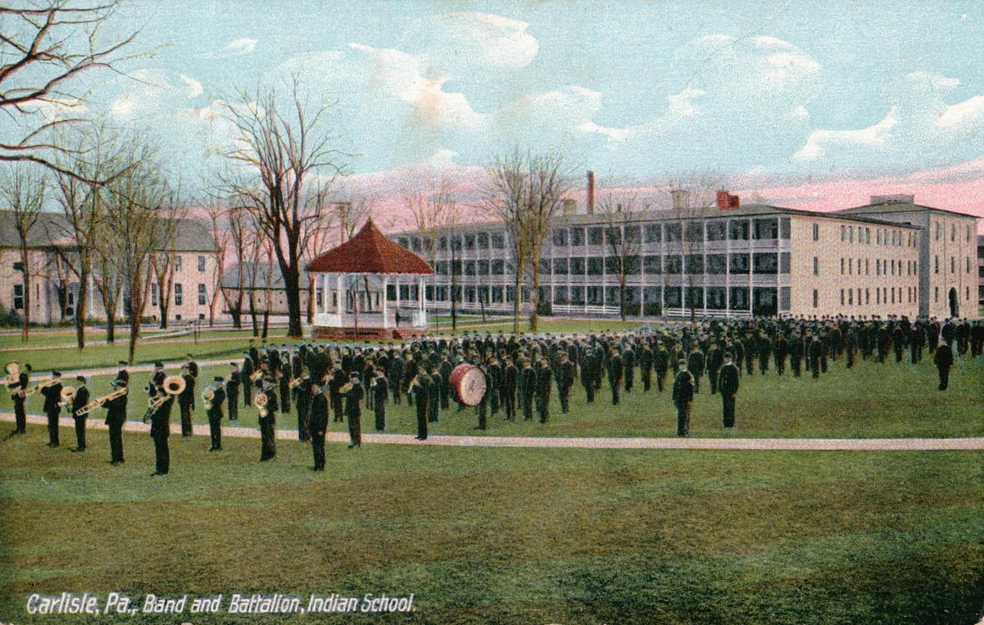
The Carlisle Indian Band earned an international reputation. Carlisle Indian School Band and Battalion - Carlisle, Pennsylvania, c. 1911

=== Native American arts program ===
Francis E. Leupp, Commissioner of Indian Affairs from 1904 to 1909, had a strong influence over the Carlisle Indian Industrial School. Leupp encouraged promoting Indian culture by teaching native arts and craft. In 1905, Leupp wrote for the Carlisle Arrow: "It seems to me that one of the errors good people fall into in dealing with the Indian is taking it for granted that their first duty is to make a white man out of him." He also stated, "The Indian is a natural warrior, a natural logician, a natural artist. We have room for all three in our highly organized social system. Let us not make the mistake, in the process, of absorbing them, of washing out of them whatever is distinctly Indian."

In 1906, Leupp appointed Native American artist Angel De Cora, trained at Hampton Institute, Virginia and Smith College, Massachusetts, to be instructor of the first Native arts course at the Carlisle. De Cora agreed to accept the position at Carlisle only if she "shall not be expected to teach in the white man's way, but shall be given complete liberty to develop the art of my own race and to apply this, as far as possible, to various forms of art, industries and crafts." The project was ambitious, and in 1907 students constructed the Leupp Indian Art Studio. The studio was strategically positioned to the entrance to the campus and designed as an exhibition hall and artist studio. Materials were purchased by using profits from the prior Carlisle Indians football season.

Public demand for Native American arts was growing, and proceeds from sales were used to raise funds for individuals on reservations and to cultivate public interest in Indian crafts. Students enjoyed Plains art and drawing traditional pictographs on paper and slates. The studio showcased paintings, drawings, leather work, beadwork, jewelry, and basketry made by students, and some produced on reservations. The floor was covered with colorful Navajo blankets. As head of the Leupp Art Studio from 1906 to 1915, De Cora emphasized design, and encouraged students to apply tribally-specific designs to marketable modern art media such as book plates, textiles, and wallpaper. Carlisle boasted a state-of-the-arts photography studio for students.

In 1908, De Cora married a Carlisle student Lone Star Dietz. At the age of 23, Dietz enrolled at Carlisle where he studied art in Philadelphia in the Summer Outing Program. After his marriage to De Cora he continued in the roles of student and assistant art teacher. In 1909, the school launched a monthly literary magazine known as the Indian Craftsman, later changed to The Red Man. Designed by the school's art department, printed and in part written by students, the magazine gained a wide reputation for the quality of its appearance and content. Lone Star created cover designs for almost all of the 50 issues of the magazine between 1909 and 1914. During their time at Carlisle, Angel and Lone Star Dietz brought cultural awareness to students through innovative teaching programs.

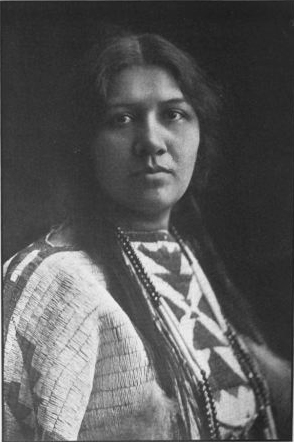
Angel De Cora (Ho-Chunk) taught arts at Carlisle

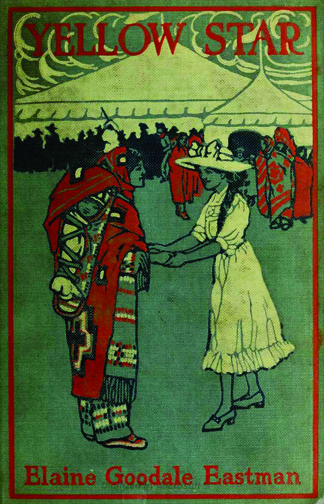
Angel De Cora and Lone Star Dietz cover art and illustrations for Elaine Goodale Eastman, 1911

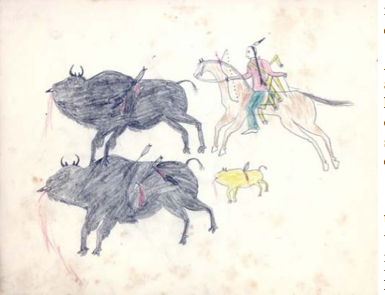
Buffalo Hunt, ledger art, by Baldwin Blue Horse (Oglala Lakota), Carlisle, c. 1880

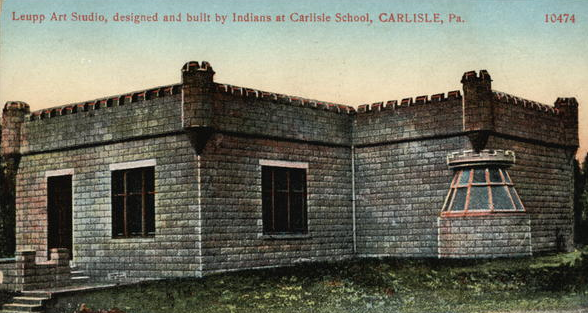
Leupp Art Studio, Carlisle, 1907

== Political context ==
=== Progressive Era fight for the image of Native Americans ===
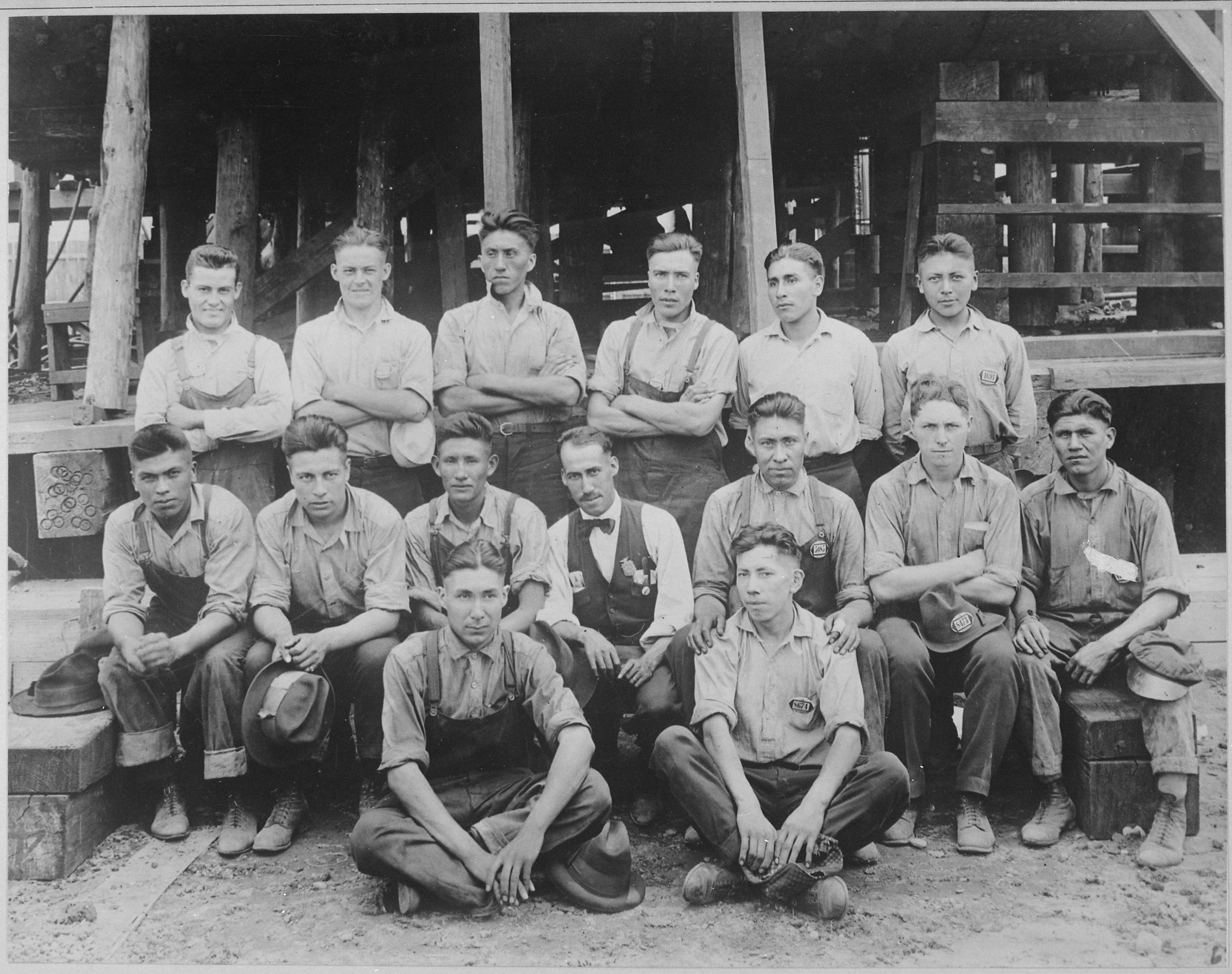
"Twenty five Indians from the Carlisle Indian College, Pennsylvania, are learning to build ships in the greatest shipyard in the world at Hog Island, Philadelphia", 1918

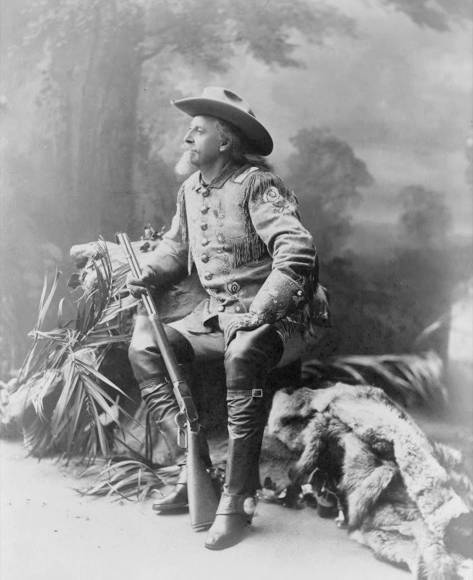
Buffalo Bill Cody and his Wild West show performed in Carlisle on June 24, 1898.

From 1886 to the onset of World War I, Progressive Reformists fought a war of images with Wild West shows before the American public at world fairs, expositions and parades. Pratt and other reformist progressives led an unsuccessful campaign to discourage Native Americans from joining Wild West shows. Reformist Progressives vigorously opposed to theatrical portrayals of Native Americans in popular Wild West shows and believed Wild West shows portrayed Native Americans as savages and vulgar stereotypes. Reformist progressives also believed Wild West shows exploited and demoralized Native Americans.

Other Progressives, such as "Buffalo Bill" Cody, who as Pratt believed Indians equals of whites, had a different approach. He allowed Indians to be Indians. New ideas were not to be thrust forcefully upon Native peoples. Cody believed Native Americans would observe modern life and different cultures, acquire new skills and customs, and change at their own pace and on their own terms. Both Pratt and Cody offered paths of opportunity and hope during time when people believed Native Americans were a vanishing race whose only hope for survival was rapid cultural transformation. Notwithstanding his criticisms, Pratt invited his old friend Buffalo Bill Cody and his Wild West show to perform in Carlisle on June 24, 1898. The school paper Red Man reported that students were "privileged to witness the best exhibition of some rude manners and customs of the people of the western frontier in the fifties and sixties."

During the Progressive Era of the late 19th and early 20th Centuries, there was an explosion of public interest in Native American culture and imagery. Newspapers, dime-store novels, Wild West shows and public exhibitions portrayed Native Americans as a "Vanishing Race." American and European anthropologists, historians, linguists, journalists, photographers, portraitists and early movie-makers believed time was of the essence to study western Native American peoples. Many researchers and artists lived on government reservations for extended periods to study Native Americans before they "vanished."

Their inspired effort heralded the "Golden Age of the Wild West." Photographers included Gertrude Käsebier, Frank A. Rinehart, Edward Curtis, Jo Mora and John Nicholas Choate, while portraitists included Elbridge Ayer Burbank, Charles M. Russell and John Hauser. The "Vanishing Race" theme was dramatized at the Trans-Mississippi Exposition of 1898 at Omaha, Nebraska, and the Pan-American Exposition of 1901 in Buffalo, New York. Exposition organizers assembled Wild Westers representing different tribes who portrayed Native Americans as a "vanishing race" at "The Last Great Congress of the Red Man", brought together for the first and last time, apparently to commiserate before they all vanished.

During this period, U.S. Government policy focused upon acquiring Indian lands, restricting cultural and religious practices and sending Native American children to boarding schools. Progressives agreed that the situation was serious and that something needed to be done to educate and acculturate Native Americans to white society, but they differed as to education models and speed of assimilation. Reformist progressives, a coalition led by the Bureau of Indian Affairs, Native American educators and Christian organizations, promoted rapid assimilation of children through off-reservation Indian boarding schools and immersion in white culture.

At Carlisle, Pratt developed a photographic record of the model school for publicity and documentation. The institution and the school were photographed during the school's existence by approximately a dozen professional photographers. The photographs evidenced that the school successfully acclimated Indians to the white man's culture. The first and best known photographer of the Carlisle Indian Industrial School was John Nicolas Choate. "After replacing Indian dress with military uniforms and cutting their hair in Anglo fashion, the Indians' physical appearance was transformed." Before and after "contrast" photos were sent to officials in Washington, charitable donors and to reservations to recruit new students. "Pratt's powerful photographs showing his quick results helped persuade Washington that he was doing vital work.

=== Society of American Indians ===
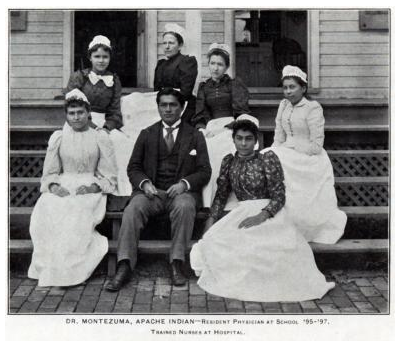
Dr. Carlos Montezuma was drawn to the experiment at Carlisle, and served as resident physician from 1895 to 1897.

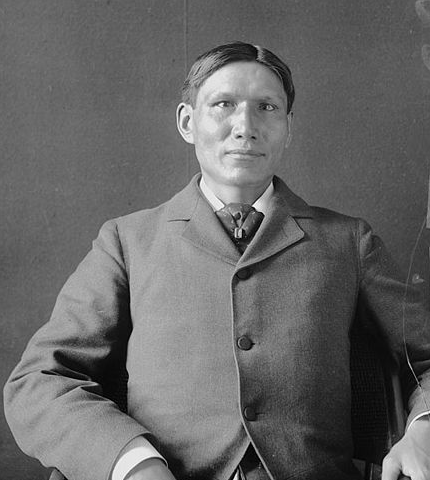
Dr. Charles Eastman was a frequent visitor and lecturer at Carlisle. 1897

The Carlisle Indian School was a wellspring for the Society of American Indians, the first Indian rights organization created by and for Indians. The society was a group of about fifty prominent Native American intelligentsia who exchanged views collectively confronting their tribes and gave birth to Pan-Indianism. The organization was influenced by the Carlisle experience and dedicated to self-determination and preserving Native American culture. From 1911 to 1923, the society was forefront in the fight for Indian citizenship and the passage of the Indian Citizenship Act of 1924.

Founding members included Dr. Carlos Montezuma, Dr. Charles Eastman, Angel De Cora, Zitkala-Ša and Chauncey Yellow Robe. The Society of American Indians printed a quarterly literary journal, American Indian Magazine. Dr. Montezuma joined Pratt at the Carlisle Indian School as a resident physician from 1895 to 1897. Montezuma, a correspondent with Pratt since 1887, was drawn to the noble experiment at Carlisle. The physician Charles Eastman and his wife, Elaine Goodale Eastman, and children, resided at Carlisle in 1899, and were frequent visitors and lecturers.

== Native Americans in mainstream culture at the time ==
=== World fairs and expositions ===
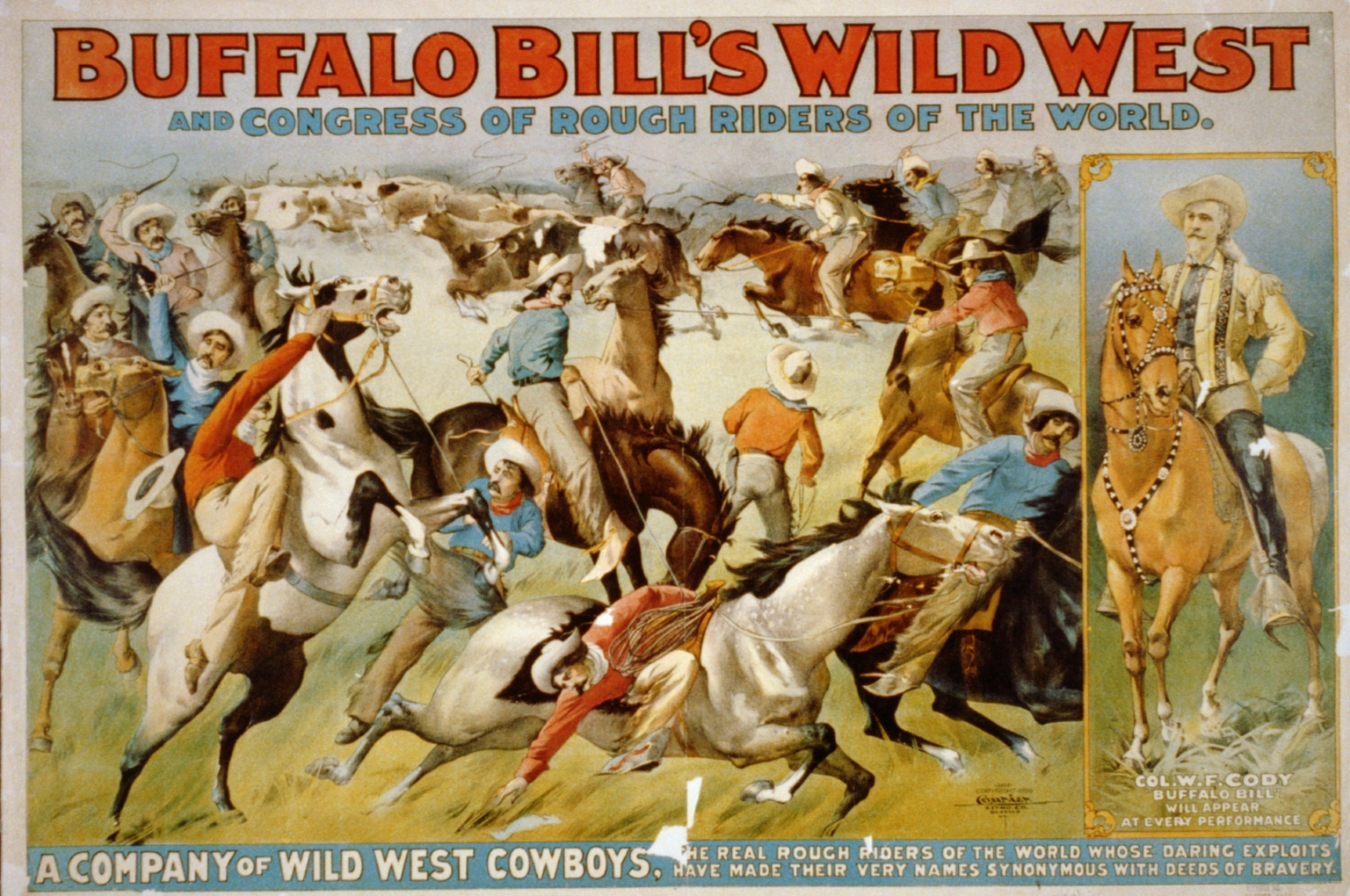
In 1893, over two million patrons saw Buffalo Bill's Wild West show perform during the Columbian Exposition in Chicago, Illinois. During the Progressive Era, from the late 19th century until the onset of World War I, Native American performers were major draws and money-makers.

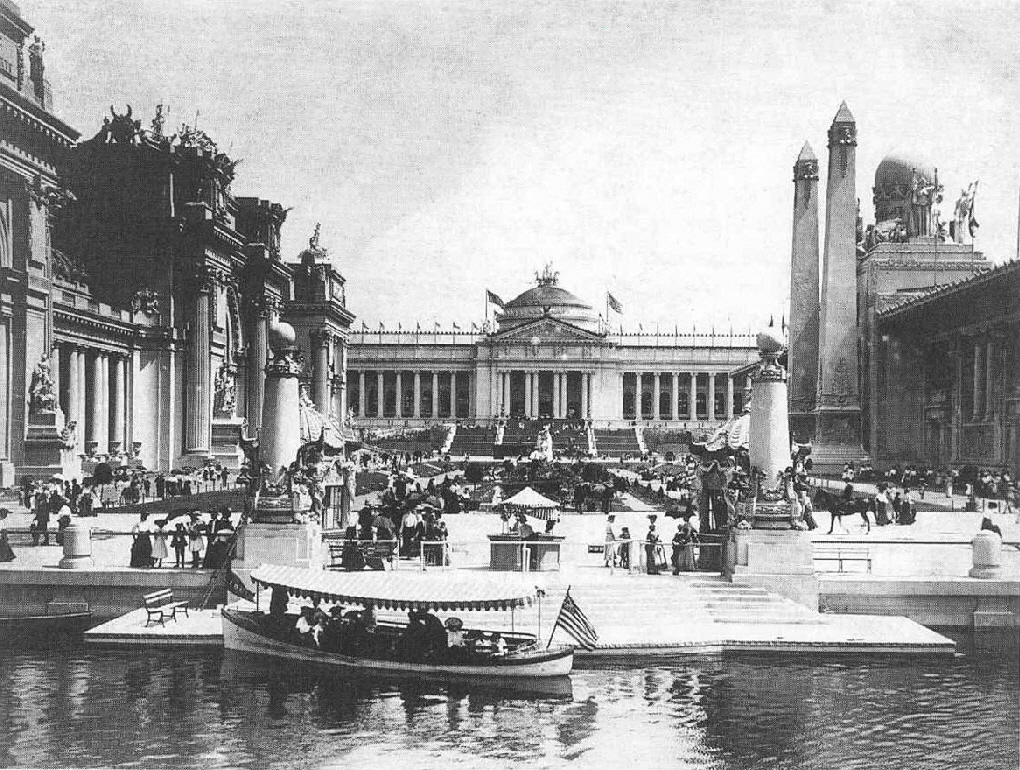
In 1904, the Carlisle Indian Band performed during the Louisiana Purchase Exposition in St. Louis at the Pennsylvania state pavilion, while the Haskell Indian Band performed a mixture of classical, popular music and Dennison Wheelock's Aboriginal Suite which included Native dances and war whoops by band members.

During the Progressive Era, from the late 19th century until the onset of World War I, Native American performers were major draws and money-makers. Millions of visitors at world fairs, exhibitions and parades throughout the United States and Europe observed Native Americans portrayed as the vanishing race, exotic peoples and objects of modern comparative anthropology. Reformists Progressives fought a war of words and images against popular Wild West shows at world fairs, expositions and parades.

In 1893, the fight for the image of the Native American began when Reformist Progressives pressured organizers to deny William F. ("Buffalo Bill") Cody a place at the Columbian Exposition of 1893 in Chicago, Illinois. Instead, a feature of the Exposition was a model Indian school and an ethnological Indian village supported by the Bureau of Indian Affairs.

In style, Buffalo Bill established a fourteen-acre swath of land near the main entrance of the fair for "Buffalo Bill's Wild West and Congress of Rough Riders of the World" where he erected stands around an arena large enough to seat 18,000 spectators. Seventy-four "Wild Westers" from Pine Ridge, South Dakota, who had recently returned from a tour of Europe, were contracted to perform in the show. Cody brought in an additional one hundred Wild Westers directly from Pine Ridge, Standing Rock and Rosebud reservations, who visited the Exposition at his expense and participated in the opening ceremonies. Over two million patrons saw Buffalo Bill's Wild West outside the Columbian Exposition, often mistaking the show as an integral part to the World's Fair.

The Louisiana Purchase Exposition of 1904, known as the St. Louis World's Fair, was the last of the great fairs in the United States before World War I. Organizers wanted their exotic people to be interpreted by anthropologists in a modern scientific manner portraying contrasting images of Native Americans. A Congress of Indian Educators was convened and Oglala Lakota Chief Red Cloud and Chief Blue Horse, both eighty-three years old, and the best-known Native America orators at the St. Louis World's Fair, spoke to audiences. A model Indian School was placed on top on a hill so Indians below could see their future as portrayed by the Bureau of Indian Affairs.

On one side of the school, "blanket Indians", men or women who refused to relinquish their native dress and customs, demonstrated their artistry inside the school on one side of the hall. On the other side, Indian boarding school students displayed their achievements in reading, writing, music, dancing, trades and arts. The Carlisle Indian Band performed at the Pennsylvania state pavilion, and the Haskell Indian Band performed a mixture of classical, popular music and Dennison Wheelock's Aboriginal Suite which included Native dances and war whoops by band members.

=== The Inaugural Parade of President Theodore Roosevelt, 1905 ===
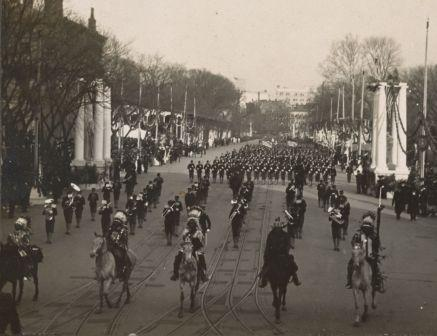
The First Inaugural Parade of the 26th President, Theodore Roosevelt, March 4, 1905. President Roosevelt vigorously waived his hat and all in the President's box rose to their feet to behold the powerful imagery of the six famous Native American chiefs on horseback adorned with face paint and elaborate feather headdresses, followed by the 46-piece Carlisle Indian School Band and a brigade of 350 Carlisle Cadets at arms.

On March 4, 1905, Wild Westers and Carlisle portrayed contrasting images of Native Americans at the First Inaugural Parade of 26th President Theodore Roosevelt. Six famous Native American Chiefs, Geronimo (Chiricahua Apache), Quanah Parker (Comanche), Buckskin Charlie (Ute), American Horse (Oglala Lakota), Hollow Horn Bear (Sicangu Lakota) and Little Plume (Blackfeet), met in Carlisle, Pennsylvania, for dress rehearsal on the main street to practice for the parade in Washington.

Theodore Roosevelt sat in the presidential box with his wife, daughter and other distinguished guests, and watched West Point army cadets and the famed 7th Cavalry, Gen. George A. Custer's former unit that fought at the Battle of Little Bighorn, march down Pennsylvania Avenue. When the contingent of "Wild Westers" and the "Carlisle Cadets" and Band came into view, President Roosevelt vigorously waved his hat and all in the President's box rose to their feet to behold the powerful imagery of the six famous Native American Chiefs on horseback adorned with face paint and elaborate feather headdresses, followed by the 46-piece Carlisle Indian Industrial School Band and a brigade of 350 Carlisle Cadets at arms.

Leading the group was "Geronimo", of the Apache, in his regalia including war paint, sitting astride his horse, also in war paint, in the center of the street. It was reported that: "The Chiefs created a sensation, eclipsing the intended symbolism of a formation of 350 uniformed Carlisle students led by a marching band," and "all eyes were on the six chiefs, the cadets received passing mention in the newspapers and nobody bothered to photograph them." The Carlisle Band led by Claude M. Stauffer and cadets led by Captain William A. Mercer, superintendent of the school and member of the 7th Cavalry.

=== Carlisle "Wild Westers" ===
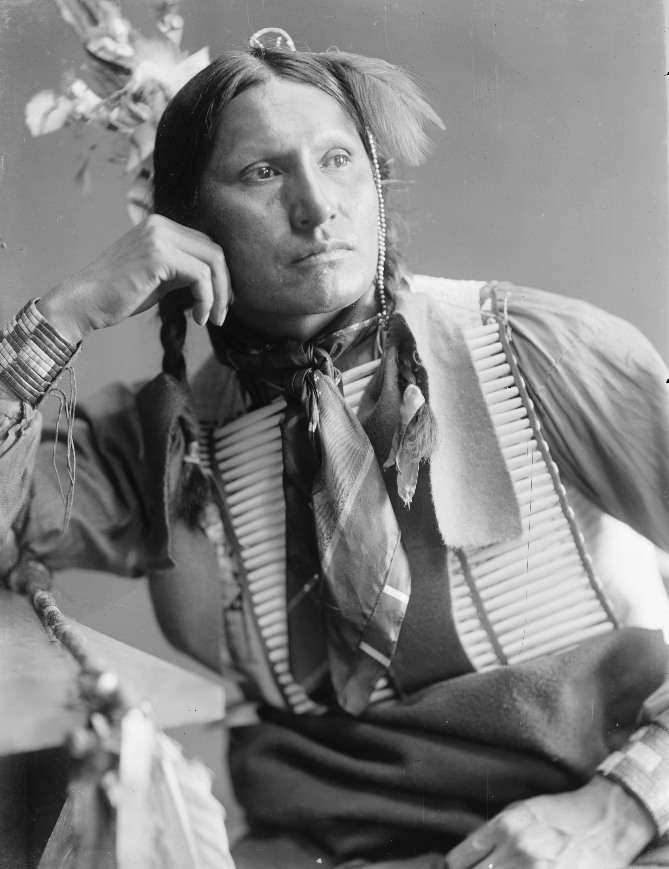
Samuel American Horse was a "Carlisle Wild Wester". Since 1887, "Wild Westing" has been family tradition with many Pine Ridge families. Gertrude Käsebier, c. 1900

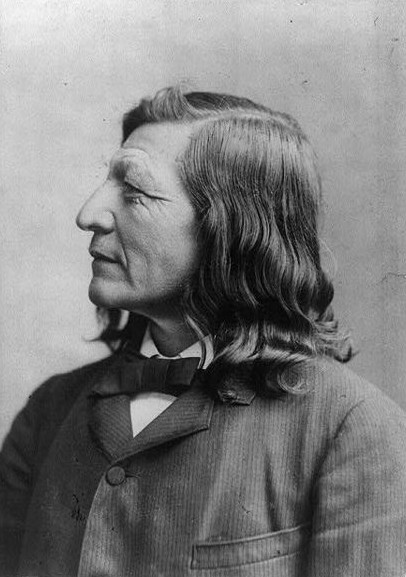
Luther Standing Bear (Oglala Lakota), Pratt's model student, was attracted to "Wild Westing" for the adventure, pay, and opportunity. Standing Bear is notable as a 20th-century Native American author, educator, philosopher and actor.

The Carlisle Indian School and "Wild Westing" were portals to education, opportunity and hope, and came at a time when the Lakota people were depressed, impoverished, harassed and confined. Wild Westers from Pine Ridge enrolled their children at the Carlisle Indian Industrial School from its beginning in 1879 until its closure in 1918. Known as "Show Indians", Oglala Wild Westers referred to themselves as Oskate Wicasa, a colloquialism meaning "one who performs" or "Show Man", a title of great honor and respect. Its usage began in the early days of the Buffalo Bill Cody Wild West shows.

The phrase "Show Indians" likely originated among newspaper reporters and editorial writers as early as 1891. By 1893 the term appears frequently in Bureau of Indian Affairs correspondence. Some believe that the term is derogatory describing the "phenomenon of Native exploitation and romanticization in the U.S." Arguments of a similar nature were made by the Bureau of Indian Affairs during the popularity of Wild West shows in the United States and Europe.

Many Carlisle students, mostly Lakota, had parents, family and friends who were Wild Westers. Ben American Horse and Samuel American Horse, sons of Oglala Lakota Chief American Horse from the Pine Ridge Reservation, South Dakota, attended Carlisle and went "Wild Westing" with their father. Often entire families worked together, and the tradition of the "Wild Wester" community is not unlike the tradition of circus families and communities. Carlisle Wild Westers were attracted by the adventure, pay and opportunity and were hired as performers, chaperons, interpreters and recruiters.

Frank C. Goings, the recruiting agent for "Buffalo Bill" Cody and other "Wild West" shows at Pine Ridge, South Dakota, was a Carlisle "Wild Wester" with experience as a performer, interpreter and chaperon. Goings carefully chose the famous chiefs, the best dancers, the best singers, and the best riders; screened for performers willing to be away from home for extended periods of time and coordinated travel, room and board. He traveled with his wife and children, and for many years toured Europe and the United States with "Buffalo Bill's Wild West", Miller Brothers 101 Ranch and the Sells Floto Circus.

== Closing and legacy ==
=== Pratt's retirement ===
Pratt came into conflict with government officials over his outspoken views on the need for Native Americans to assimilate. In 1903, Pratt denounced the Indian Bureau and the reservation system as a hindrance to the civilization and assimilation of Native Americans ("American Indians"). "Better, far better for the Indians," he said, "had there never been a Bureau." As a result of the controversy, Pratt was forced to retire as superintendent of Carlisle after 24 years and was placed on the retired list as a brigadier general in the United States Army.

In retirement, Pratt and his wife Anna Laura traveled widely, often visiting former students and lecturing and still writing on Indian issues. Pratt continued to advocate for Native American rights until his death at the age of 83 on March 15, 1924, at the old Letterman Army Hospital in the Presidio of San Francisco, at San Francisco, California. Pratt's modest granite memorial stone in Arlington National Cemetery across the Potomac River from Washington, D.C. says "Erected In Loving Memory by his Students and Other Indians."

=== Assimilation efforts at Carlisle ===
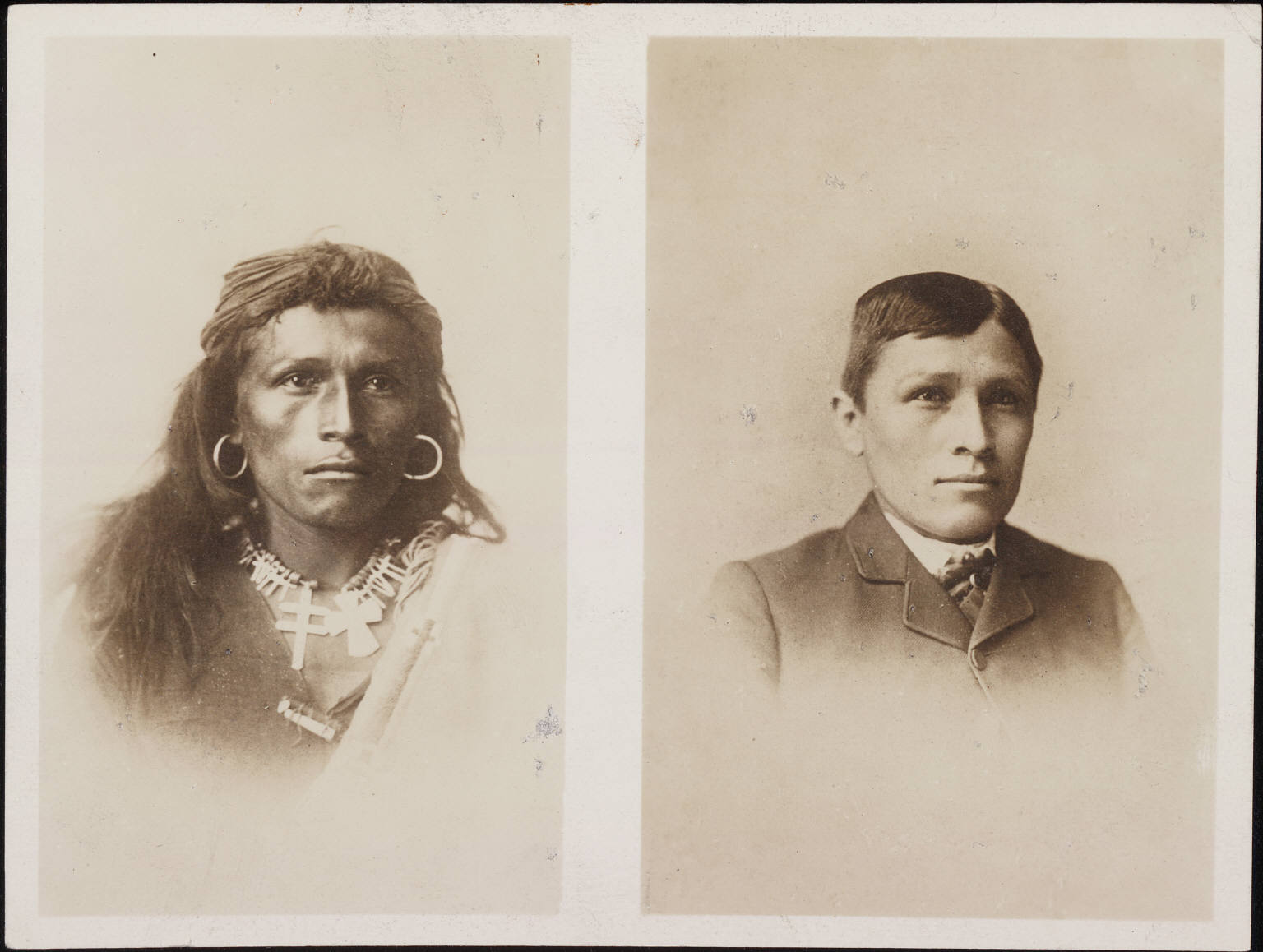
Tom Torlino, Navajo, before and after. Photograph from the Richard Henry Pratt Papers, Yale University. Circa 1882

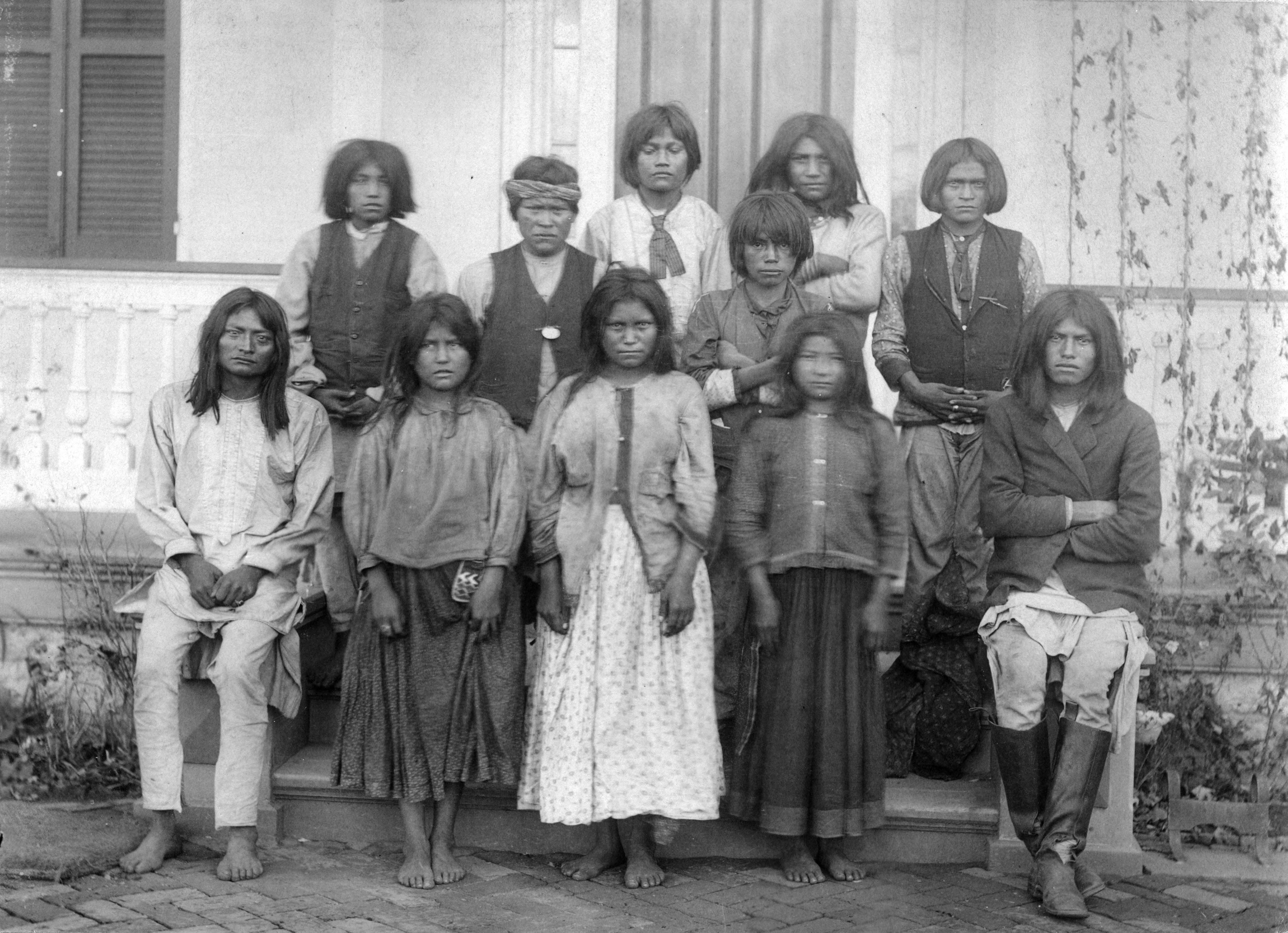
Chiricahua Apaches as they arrived at Carlisle from Fort Marion, Florida 1886

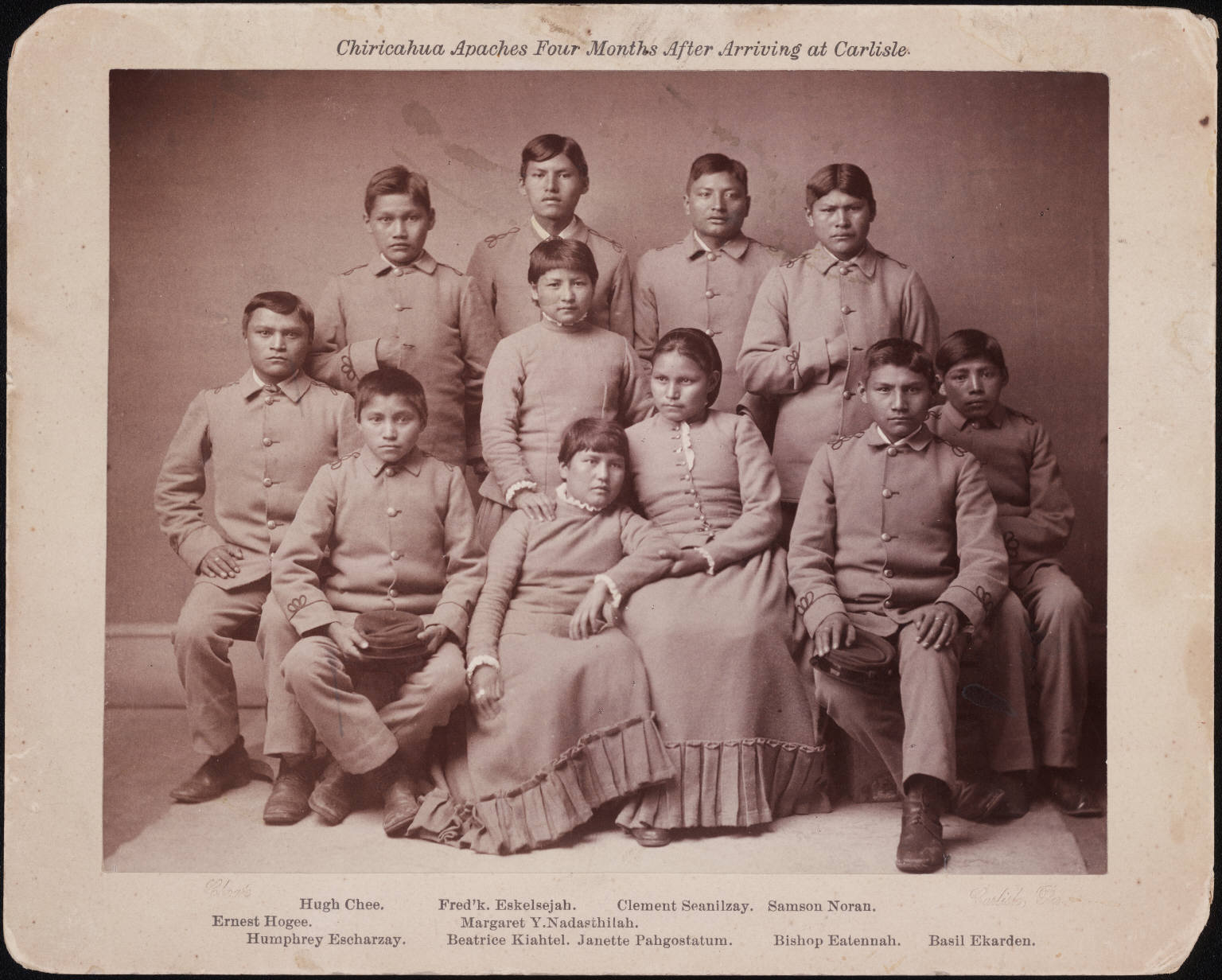
Before-and-after contrast photos were sent to officials in Washington, potential charitable donors, and to reservations to recruit new students. Pratt's powerful photographs showing quick results helped persuade Washington that he was doing vital work. "Chiricahua Apaches Four Months After Arriving at Carlisle", Carlisle, Pennsylvania, undated

Carlisle was created with the explicit goal of assimilating Native Americans into mainstream European-American culture. "The goal of acculturation was to be accomplished by "total immersion" in the white man's world." Pratt founded Carlisle to immerse Native American children in mainstream culture and teach them English, new skills, and customs. Pratt's slogan was "to civilize the Indian, get him into civilization. To keep him civilized, let him stay." Pratt's approach was harsh but an alternative to the tendency towards physical extermination of Native Americans.

While assimilation was a crucial part of the Carlisle School's plan, it was also looked at controversially by some Native Americans who felt they were pushed to marry interracially. As Katherine Ellinghaus notes in her book, "There was considerable resistance to the school's unspoken policy regarding interracial marriage." On the Carlisle Indian School Digital Resource Center, this also proves evident. Isaiah Wasaquam, a member of the Ottawa Nation, echoes controversy in an application to Carlisle when he answers a question about his marriage proudly, "it has been nearly ten years since I married my Race."

Research suggests this was a subtle hint to the school's officials to prove that they have married their own race. Most likely, this backlash by the Natives is due to the fact that the school was trying to, "take the Indian out of the man." Additionally, Cathleen Cahill proves that the Carlisle School matches the time in history that enveloped such assimilation, "During the closing decades of the nineteenth century, the federal government's strategies for changing Indian societies tacitly encouraged interracial marriage." Although this unwritten rule of interracial marriage was never proven, the conversation remains ongoing regarding the controversiality of this occurrence.

All children who attended Carlisle were subjected to "militaristic regimentation and disciplines," such as cutting of their hair, changing their dress, diets, names, and learning unfamiliar conceptions of space and time. They were also forced to let go of their cultural gender roles, and assimilate to what white men believed they should do in society. Native women traditionally held important political, social and economic power within their communities, as most Native cultures promoted gender equality, and this was disrupted at Carlisle.

The Documents Concerning Mary Welch, from the Carlisle Indian Digital Resource Center, provide validation of Welch's completion of seven years at the Carlisle school, and say that she would make a fine housekeeper or seamstress. However, Welch was a member of the Cherokee Nation, whose women are known for speaking out against the colonization and expansionism of American settlers. Some Cherokee women also attained the rank of chief. "They were not, as Euro-Americans imagine, merely chattel, servants to man, wives, and mothers." It wasn't uncommon for Native women to be warriors, statesmen, religious leaders, and shamans (the equivalent of doctors). Carlisle instructors forced the women to learn the industrial and domestic skills appropriate to European American gender roles. For many of them, this cultural assault led to confusion, alienation, homesickness and resentment.

During the first few weeks at Carlisle, when the Lakota and Dakota greatly outnumbered all other tribes, it was discovered that Cheyennes and Kiowas were learning to speak Lakota and Dakota. After that, English was the only language permitted on the campus. Dormitory rooms held three or four each, and no two students from the same tribe were permitted to room together. The plan helped in the rapid acquisition of English, and although some were hereditary foes, Pratt believed the Indian students to be less inclined to quarrel than most white children.

However, there were consequences. In 1879, Chief Blue Horse's son Baldwin Blue Horse, age 12, was in the first group of Oglala Lakota students to arrive at Carlisle. In 1888, Chief Blue Horse met with Baldwin at a performance of Buffalo Bill's Wild West in Philadelphia, Pennsylvania and spoke through an interpreter. Later Luther Standing Bear was called to the superintendent's office and asked him if it was a good idea to get some Indian boys from the reservation and put them in school with white boys, expecting that the Indian boys would learn faster by such an association.

Luther agreed that it might be a good plan, so a permit was received from Washington. Sixty boys from Pine Ridge were mixed with 60 European-American boys. Teachers had hoped the Indians would learn the English language faster by this arrangement. "But lo and behold, the white boys began learning the Sioux language." The program was discontinued. Most Native Americans are angry about painful Indian boarding school experiences and Pratt's Progressive Reformist views on assimilation have been condemned.

=== Back on the reservation ===
One student, Luther Standing Bear got a mixed reception at home on the reservation. Some were proud of his achievements while others did not like that he had "become a white man." He was happy to be home, and some of his relatives said that he "looked like a white boy dressed in eastern clothes." Luther was proud to be compared to a white boy, but some would not shake his hand. Some returning Carlisle students had become ashamed of their culture, while some tried to pretend that they did not speak Lakota.

The difficulties of returning Carlisle I.I.S. students disturbed white educators. Returning Carlisle students found themselves between two cultures, not accepted by either. Some rejected their educational experiences and "returned to the blanket," casting off "white ways"; others found it more convenient and satisfying to remain in white society. Most adjusted to both worlds.

In 1905, Standing Bear decided to leave the reservation. He was no longer willing to endure existence under the control of an overseer. Luther sold his land allotment and bought a house in Sioux City, Iowa, where he worked as a clerk in a wholesale firm. After a brief job doing rodeo performances with Miller Brothers 101 Ranch in Oklahoma (former old Indian Territory), he moved to California to seek full-time employment in the motion picture industry. While Standing Bear left the confinement of the reservation, he continued his responsibilities as an Oglala Lakota chief, fighting to preserve Lakota heritage and sovereignty through public education.

=== Deaths from infectious diseases ===
Exposure to "white men's diseases", especially tuberculosis, was a major health problem on the reservation as well as the East. During the years of operation, hundreds of children died at Carlisle. Most died from infectious diseases common in the early 20th century that killed many children. More than 180 students were buried in the Carlisle Indian School Cemetery. The bodies of most who died were sent to their families. Children who died of tuberculosis were buried at the school, as people were worried about contagion.

== 20th century ==
Beginning in the early 1900s, the Carlisle Indian Industrial School began to diminish in relevance. With growth of more localized private and government reservation schools in the West, children no longer needed to travel to a distant Eastern school in Pennsylvania. Successive superintendents at Carlisle Indian School after Pratt, Captain William A. Mercer (1904–1908), Moses Friedman (1908–1914), Oscar Lipps (1914–1917) and John Francis Jr. (1917–1918), were besieged by faculty debate and pressures from the Indian Commission and the U.S. Army.

Around 1913, rumors circulated at Carlisle that there was a movement to close the school. In 1914, a Congressional investigation focused on management at the School and the out-sized role played by athletics. Pop Warner, Superintendent Moses Friedman and Bandmaster C.M. Stauffer were dismissed. After the hearings, attendance dwindled and morale declined. The reason for Carlisle's existence had passed.

When the United States entered World War I on April 6, 1917, there was an additional reduction of enrollment. Many Carlisle I.I.S. alumni and students served in the U.S. military during World War I. On the morning of September 1, 1918, a transfer ceremony took place. The American flag was lowered for the last time at the Carlisle Indian School and presented to Major A.C. Backmeyer, who raised it again over the new U.S. Army Base Hospital Number 31, a pioneering new type of rehabilitation hospital to treat soldiers wounded in World War I. Remaining pupils were sent home or to other off-reservation boarding schools in the United States.

In the spring of 1951, the U.S. Army War College, founded 1901, senior educational institution of the U.S. Army, relocated to the old Carlisle Barracks. In 1961, the complex was designated a National Historic Landmark (NHL), and it was expanded in 1984 to include 24 buildings and structures over 24.5 acres.

From 1879 until 1918, more than 10,000 Native American children from 140 tribes had attended Carlisle. The school's 1911 Annual Report included the results of an employment survey of 532 graduates and 3619 other ex-students. Tribes with the largest number of students included the Lakota, Ojibwe, Cherokee, Apache, Cheyenne, Alaska Native, Iroquois Seneca, and Oneida. The Carlisle Indian School exemplified Progressive Era values. Some believed Carlisle provided an excellent education.

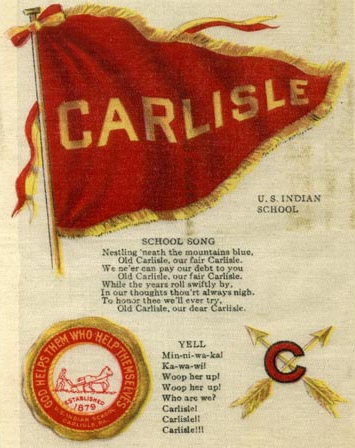
Carlisle Indian School pennant, school song, motto and yell. "Min-ni-wa-ka! Ka-wa-wi! Woop her up! Woop her up! Who are we? Carlisle! Carlisle!! Carlisle!!!"

In the late 20th century, there was a reexamination of assimilation efforts by the U.S. government, and practices at Carlisle and other similar schools served as the basis for some of that reexamination. Some Native Americans criticized the break-up of their families for years as students were sent off to such boarding schools and were seen as efforts to force children away from their families' cultures. Pratt's views on assimilation also were criticized.

On December 9, 2024, President Joe Biden designated the site coextensive with the national historic landmark as a national monument. The School Road Gateposts will be transferred from the Army to the National Park Service, and the agencies will cooperatively manage the monument. Indian tribes will have co-stewardship of the monument.

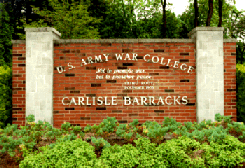
Jim Thorpe Sports Day is the biggest annual extracurricular event at the U.S. Army War College, Carlisle, Pennsylvania.

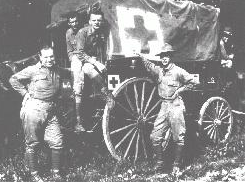
In 1918, the Carlisle Indian Industrial School closed and the old historic Carlisle Barracks temporarily became U.S. Army Base Hospital No. 31 to treat soldiers wounded in World War I.

== Contemporary institutions ==
The Carlisle Indian Industrial School National Historic Landmark is partly within Carlisle Borough and partially within North Middleton Township.

=== U.S. Army Heritage and Education Center ===
The U.S. Army Heritage and Education Center (USAHEC), in Carlisle, Pennsylvania, is the U.S. Army's primary historical research facility. With its oldest part established in 1967, and later reorganized in 1999 and reorganized again in 2013, the center consists of the U.S. Army Military History Institute (U.S.A.M.H.I.) (of 1967), the Army Heritage Museum (A.H.M.), the Digital Archives Division, the Historical Services Division, the Research and Education Services, and the U.S.A.H.E.C. Staff. The U.S. Army Heritage and Education Center is part of the United States Army War College, but has its own 56-acre (230,000 m2) campus in Middlesex Township nearby the Carlisle Barracks.

=== U.S. Army War College—Jim Thorpe Sports Day ===
Jim Thorpe Sports Day is the biggest annual extracurricular event at the U.S. Army War College. Begun in 1974, the competition in ten sports is among the military's senior service schools, the Army, Navy and Air Force academies. The sports are played at Carlisle Barracks' historic Indian Field, where Jim Thorpe once displayed the teamwork, discipline and physical fitness that inspires the name of the athletic games at Carlisle.

=== Cumberland County Historical Society ===
The Carlisle Indian Industrial School is remembered and honored by the people of the Borough of Carlisle. The Cumberland County Historical Society in Carlisle, Pennsylvania, houses an extensive collection of archival materials and photographs from the Carlisle Indian Industrial School. Among the items are 39 years of weekly and monthly school newspapers, musical and athletic programs, brochures, letters, catalogs and the annual reports to the Commissioners of Indian Affairs. The society has over 3,000 photographs and recorded oral histories from school alumni, relatives of former students and local townspeople. In 2000, the Cumberland County 250th Anniversary Committee worked with Native Americans from numerous tribes and non-natives to organize a "Pow-wow" on Memorial Day to commemorate the unique Carlisle Indian School, the students and their stories.

=== Carlisle Indian School Digital Resource Center ===
The Carlisle Indian School Digital Resource Center is a publicly accessible digital archive of material pertaining to the Carlisle Indian Industrial School. The project is run by the Archives and Special Collections Department of the Waidner-Spahr Library at Dickinson College, and by the Community Studies Center at Dickinson College. Additionally, the project is advised by a number of subject-area experts and cultural advisers. The project seeks to aggregate collections of primary source materials held at various repositories, including the National Archives and Records Administration, the Cumberland County Historical Society, and the Archives and Special Collections at Dickinson College.

== In media ==
- Band and Battalion of the U.S. Indian School is a silent film documentary made on April 30, 1901, by American Mutoscope and Biograph Company (AM&B) made in Carlisle. The cinematographer Arthur Marvin depicts a parade drill by the cadet corps of the American Indian School which includes many representatives of the Native American tribes. In 1902 Marvin produced another documentary, "Club Swinging at Carlisle Indian School" for AM&B.
- Carlisle Indian Industrial School was depicted in the 1951 movie classic Jim Thorpe – All-American, a biographical feature film produced by Warner Bros. and directed by Michael Curtiz, honoring Jim Thorpe. Historian Mark Rubinfeld says, "The movie stands out as an important cultural document in both American and Native American history." The film starred Burt Lancaster as Thorpe and featured some archival footage of both the 1912 and 1932 Summer Olympics, as well as other footage of the real Thorpe (seen in long shots). Charles Bickford played the famed football coach - Glenn Scobey ("Pop") Warner, who was Thorpe's longtime mentor. Bickford also narrated the film, which told of Thorpe's athletic rise and fall, ending on an upbeat note when he was asked by a group of boys to coach them. Phyllis Thaxter portrayed Thorpe's first wife. Warner Bros. used a number of contract players in the film, as well as a few Native American actors. Bacone College, an indigenous-serving institution in Muskogee, Oklahoma, filled in for Carlisle in the movie.
- Part of the 2005 mini-series on cable TV's Turner Network Television, Into the West, takes place at the school, showing an unforgiving side of its founder.
- The Public Broadcasting Service (PBS) documentary In the White Man's Image (1992) tells the story of Richard Pratt and the founding of the Carlisle School. It was directed by Christine Lesiak, and part of the American history documentary series The American Experience, also produced by PBS. The documentary features interviews with Indian educators N. Scott Momaday and Henrietta Mann, as well as frontier historian Robert M. Utley and Professor of American studies Lonna Malmsheimer.
- The "Dear America" Series young adult fictional diary, My Heart is on the Ground by Ann Rinaldi (1999), tells the story of Nannie Little Rose, a Sioux girl sent to the school in 1880.
- Numerous additional works address the stories of former residents of the Carlisle Indian Industrial School and other Native American boarding schools in Western New York and Canadian Indian residential school system such as Thomas Indian School, and Mohawk Institute Residential School in Brantford, Southern Ontario; the impact of those and similar schools on their communities; and community efforts to overcome those impacts. Examples include: the film Unseen Tears: A Documentary on Boarding School Survivors, Ronald James Douglas' graduate thesis titled Documenting ethnic cleansing in North America: Creating Unseen Tears, and the Legacy of Hope Foundation's online media collection: "Where are the Children? Healing the Legacy of the Residential Schools". Legacy of Hope Foundation.
- The memoir Apple: Skin to the Core by Eric Gansworth is a book in poems and images documenting the author's life as well as that of his extended Family. Three of the author's grandparents attended Carlisle Indian Industrial School and the book details both the experience and the aftermath of their attendance there. Gansworth is an enrolled member of the Onondaga Nation, born and raised among the Tuscaroras. The book was in the longlist of the National Book Awards 2020 for Young People's Literature.
- A Council of Dolls is a historical fiction novel based on the author Mona Susan Power's family history with boarding schools. Three generations of Dakota women grapple with the effects of being forced to attend Carlisle Indian Industrial School, where they are stripped of their cultural identity and suffer abuse.

== See also ==
- Marianna Burgess
- American Indian outing programs
- List of national monuments of the United States
