= John Nicolas Choate =

American photographer (1848–1902)

John Nicolas Choate (1848–1902) was an American photographer in Carlisle, Pennsylvania known for his glass plate negative images of the Carlisle Indian School, scenic shots, and images of the town and townspeople. Dickinson College has a collection of his glass plates.
