= Civilization Fund Act =

Former law of the United States intended to "civilize" Native Americans

- Long title: An Act making provision for the civilization of the Indian tribes adjoining the frontier settlements.
- Nicknames: Civilization Fund Act of 1819
- Enacted by: the 15th United States Congress
- Effective: March 3, 1819

Citations
- Public law: Pub. L. 15–85
- Statutes at Large: 3 Stat. 516b, Chap. 85

Legislative history
- Signed into law by President James Monroe on March 3, 1819

The Civilization Fund Act, also known as the Indian Civilization Act, was an Act passed by the United States Congress on March 3, 1819. The Act encouraged activities of benevolent societies in providing education for Native Americans and authorized an annuity to stimulate the "civilization process". Thomas L. McKenney lobbied Congress in support of the legislation. It was originally intended to support schools in native villages and areas, such as those established by religious missions. These were operated by both Protestant and Catholic organizations. In 1891 through the early 20th century, the government used the Civilization Fund Act as authority to establish numerous Native American boarding schools.

The Civilization Fund Act eventually led to the creation of the Bureau of Indian Affairs (BIA) in 1824. The BIA was responsible for implementing various aspects of U.S. government policy towards Native Americans, including overseeing the educational programs funded by the Civilization Fund Act.

The benevolent societies were a combination of Christian missions and the federal government.

Federal funds were allocated to schools designed to educate Native Americans in the English language and ways of Anglo-Americans. The goal was to "civilize" Native Americans by teaching them reading and writing in the missionary schools. Later in the century, there was more emphasis on forcing them to give up native religions, culture and languages.

The passage of the Act resulted in development of a new class structure within Native American societies. While often traditional Native Americans opposed the schools, "progressive" ones, including senior leaders, accepted the schools, believing they were a way for their people to learn to negotiate with the increasing number of European Americans they encountered. Some of these young men with education and command of the English language rose to leadership positions within tribes, as in the American Southeast. According to historian William Jeynes, they were influenced to agree to treaties that ceded communal lands to the United States government. Within the tribal communities, some leaders believed that, given the increasing number of American settlers entering their territories, the tribes were going to be forced to cede their lands, and they were trying to gain the best deals for their people.

"That for the purpose of guarding against the further decline and final extinction of the Indian tribes, adjoining the frontier settlements of the United States, are for introducing among them the habits and arts of civilization" annual sum/annuity is ten thousand dollars "and an account of the expenditure of the money, and proceedings in execution of the foregoing provisions, shall be laid annually before Congress."

The Bureau of Indian Affairs was created in 1824 by the federal government and placed under the War Department. This part of government had more facilities and personnel in the frontier areas where most Native Americans were living, and new responsibilities could be assigned to its staff. In some cases, the military supervised trading posts authorized by the government, which were another point of contact with Native American bands. The Bureau was created in order to administer the annuity given to the schools.

== See also ==
- Five Civilized Tribes
