= Kazantzakis, Volume 2: Politics of the Spirit =

2007 book by Peter Bien

- Cover
- Author: Peter Bien
- Language: English
- Series: Princeton Modern Greek Studies
- Subject: Literary biography
- Genre: Biography, Literary criticism
- Publisher: Princeton University Press
- Publication date: 2007
- Publication place: United States
- Pages: 610
- ISBN: 978-0-691-12813-9
- Dewey Decimal: 889.332
- LC Class: PA5610.K39
- Preceded by: Kazantzakis: Politics of the Spirit, Volume 1

Kazantzakis, Volume 2: Politics of the Spirit is a 2007 literary biography by American scholar of comparative literature Peter Bien. The work was published by Princeton University Press as part of the Princeton Modern Greek Studies series. It is the second and final volume of Bien's intellectual biography of Greek writer Nikos Kazantzakis (1883–1957), covering the period from 1938 to 1957 during which Kazantzakis wrote Zorba the Greek, Christ Recrucified, The Last Temptation of Christ, and his other major novels. Bien studies Kazantzakis's engagement with political, religious, and intellectual problems during World War II and the Greek Civil War, arguing that the author's concept of "politics of the spirit"—the integration of social activism with personal spiritual fulfillment—unified his literary output during these final nineteen years.

== Background ==
Bien's work on Nikos Kazantzakis began with his 1972 study Kazantzakis and Linguistic Revolution in Greek Literature, which was reissued by Princeton University Press in 2015 in the Princeton Legacy Library. This earlier book examined Kazantzakis's role in establishing demotic Greek as a literary language, tracing his evolution from early works that mixed both puristic and demotic elements to the spoken language of his mature novels. While Kazantzakis used puristic elements in an early novella and some plays, even his early work was somewhat mixed, with his only totally puristic work being his PhD dissertation on Nietzsche. Bien demonstrated how Kazantzakis's linguistic journey paralleled his artistic development, showing that the novels succeeded because the author's vision matched his means of expression, with demotic Greek forming a natural partnership with characterization, narration, and description. This linguistic study laid groundwork for understanding how Kazantzakis's commitment to the spoken language enabled him to capture Greek life while addressing universal themes.

== Volume 1 ==
The first volume of Politics of the Spirit, published in 1989 and reissued in paperback in 2007 to accompany the second volume, covered Kazantzakis's career from 1906 to 1938, ending with publication of his epic Odyssey. This initial volume traced Kazantzakis's philosophical development through his encounters with William James, Friedrich Nietzsche, and Henri Bergson, whose concept of creative evolution shaped his worldview. It examined his engagement with communism following Greece's catastrophic loss of Asia Minor in 1922, his travels to the Soviet Union, and the development of what Bien terms his "metapolitical" philosophy—the conviction that politics relates not to the flesh but to the spirit. The volume explored how Kazantzakis's seventeen-year labor on the Odyssey (1924-1938) resulted in a modern sequel to Homer's epic, spanning 33,333 verses and following Odysseus from his return to Ithaca through new adventures that embodied Kazantzakis's philosophical synthesis. Volume 2 builds on these foundations, showing how the vision Kazantzakis achieved in the Odyssey created both a watershed and a crisis in his career, leading him to discover in the novel form a new vehicle for expressing his synthesis of political engagement and spiritual transcendence.

== Summary ==
Volume 2 is the second and final volume of Bien's intellectual biography of Greek writer Nikos Kazantzakis (1883–1957), covering the author's life from 1938 until his death in 1957. This study, double the size of the first volume at 610 pages, traces the period during which Kazantzakis wrote Zorba the Greek, Christ Recrucified (published as The Greek Passion in America), The Last Temptation of Christ, Freedom and Death (Captain Michalis), and Saint Francis. Notably, Kazantzakis wrote Zorba the Greek while Greece was under German occupation. As the study reveals, Kazantzakis was the first Greek writer to make a living entirely from his writing, though he persistently regarded his novels as ephemeral works, considering verse the highest form of expression despite achieving his greatest success in prose narrative.

The volume falls into two sections, with the first half covering 1938-1948 and examining Kazantzakis's reaction to World War II, including his attraction to fascism and Nazism in the 1930s and what Bien identifies as his "Olympian aloofness" to wartime atrocities. The book contains twenty-nine chapters plus an appendix, proceeding chronologically through Kazantzakis's travel writings, his Spanish experiences, and analyses of works from the late 1930s including Jardin des Rochers, Othello Returns, Melissa, and Julian the Apostate. The study then moves through the occupation years (Greece was occupied by the Axis powers from 1941 to 1944) and into examinations of the major novels, offering both philosophical and political interpretations while also analyzing his dramatic works including the Prometheus trilogy, Kapodistrias, Constantine Palaiologos, Sodom and Gomorrah, Kouros, and Christopher Columbus.

Bien identifies "eschatological politics" as the key to understanding Kazantzakis—his belief that social activism and personal spiritual satisfaction must come together as concomitants. The study demonstrates how Kazantzakis evolved from his earlier engagement with what Kazantzakis himself termed "meta-communism" (rather than orthodox communist doctrine) toward a monistic worldview that sought to reconcile the dualisms that had obsessed him throughout his life. This evolution is traced through Kazantzakis's struggle to synthesize matter and spirit, a quest influenced by Henri Bergson's philosophy of creative evolution and the conviction that evolution, movement, and change offer the path to truth.

Throughout the novels, Bien identifies a mythic worldview characterized by "an intense pessimism regarding the present encased within an equally intense optimism regarding the future." These works depict the political horror of twentieth-century Europe while positing future fulfillment and concluding on notes of hope. This progression becomes pronounced as one moves from Christ Recrucified, where future hope is barely suggested, through The Last Temptation, which ends with a beginning we do not see, to Saint Francis, where the beatific state is included within the narrative as the hero attains the Kingdom while still in this life.

The volume also investigates Kazantzakis's long apprenticeship to Christian themes, analyzing how his trilogy of Christian novels represents both a religious and political achievement. Bien notes that Kazantzakis had lost his faith after reading Darwin in high school, yet these later religious works demonstrate a complex engagement with Christianity. Bien shows how Christ Recrucified brings together rational virtues with prophetic drive, reconciling human virtues with something higher than human reason. The Last Temptation functions as both religious and political novel, while Saint Francis presents a meta-Christian model demonstrating how eschatological conviction may serve as a response to discouraging political circumstances by keeping alive the sense of infinite striving without which temporal politics become rigid and self-defeating.

Dying in 1957, Kazantzakis began Report to Greco—not memoir but mythic autobiography. Bien shows how Kazantzakis deliberately reshaped his life story, inventing and suppressing details to craft what he called a "soldier's report to a general." The four stations of his spiritual ascent—Christ, Buddha, Lenin, Odysseus—become narrative architecture, finally achieving what had escaped his earlier work: Greek particularity fused with universal spiritual hunger.

== Critics ==
Darren J. N. Middleton praised the volume as "marked by lively and pristine prose, challenging and yet unassailable." He emphasized Bien's position as the world's leading authority on Kazantzakis and noted that the biography demonstrates how Kazantzakis promoted "eschatological politics", the belief that social activism and personal spiritual satisfaction must come together. Middleton valued Bien's defense of Kazantzakis against detractors who criticized his ties to communism, arguing that the writer was attracted to meta-communism rather than orthodox political doctrine. "Bien's study is credible and persuasive, primarily because he remains so close to Kazantzakis' own poetic and discursive words," Middleton observed, praising the work for being "methodical in laying the groundwork for Kazantzakis' philosophy of aesthetics and his aesthetics of philosophy."

For Peter Mackridge, the volume falls into two halves, with the first covering 1938-1948. Mackridge found Bien's approach balanced, observing that he "refuses to sugarcoat Kazantzakis's problematic character and views," finding the writer "hard to sympathize" with due to his "Olympian aloofness" to the atrocities of the Second World War. Yet Mackridge acknowledged that Bien never lets his own views sidetrack the reader who is "seldom allowed to lose sight of what it is that drives Kazantzakis." He praised how Bien "shows how Kazantzakis progressed from his concern with politics, sensuality and ethics to a love of art," arguing that Kazantzakis "seems to have constantly espoused aestheticism throughout his career without realizing it."

Dimitris Tziovas commended Bien for handling "a vast amount of material" while making references to James Joyce and Samuel Beckett. Based on the book's analysis, Tziovas identified Kazantzakis as the first Greek writer to make a living from his writing and characterized him as "a writer of the future" with an eschatological worldview who "favors myth over autobiographical truth." Tziovas noted Kazantzakis's statement that "We know that the future does not depend on us. Nevertheless, we must act as though the future did depend on us." The review praised the work as "the culmination of a 50-year involvement with Kazantzakis" and declared it "a magisterial study" that no one working on Kazantzakis can afford to ignore, though noting that some chapters appeared to have been written before recent scholarship became available.

Dennis Patrick Slattery highlighted the author's defense of Kazantzakis against those who see The Odyssey as a pessimistic work, and argued that "in his final imaginative thrust Kazantzakis wishes to deconstruct in this epic the conventional forms of family and state in order to rebuild their structures in preparation for a new world order." Slattery emphasized how the study reveals Kazantzakis's "pursuit of transforming consciousness to create a new world view," connecting this to the tradition of Homer and later Greek tragedians and philosophers. He concluded that "Bien adheres faithfully to Kazantzakis' conviction that evolution, movement, change, flow—like the world itself—offer the correct path to truth," calling the biography "a towering achievement" from which "every reader of modern literature can learn."
