= Stratis Haviaras =

Greek-American writer (1935–2020)

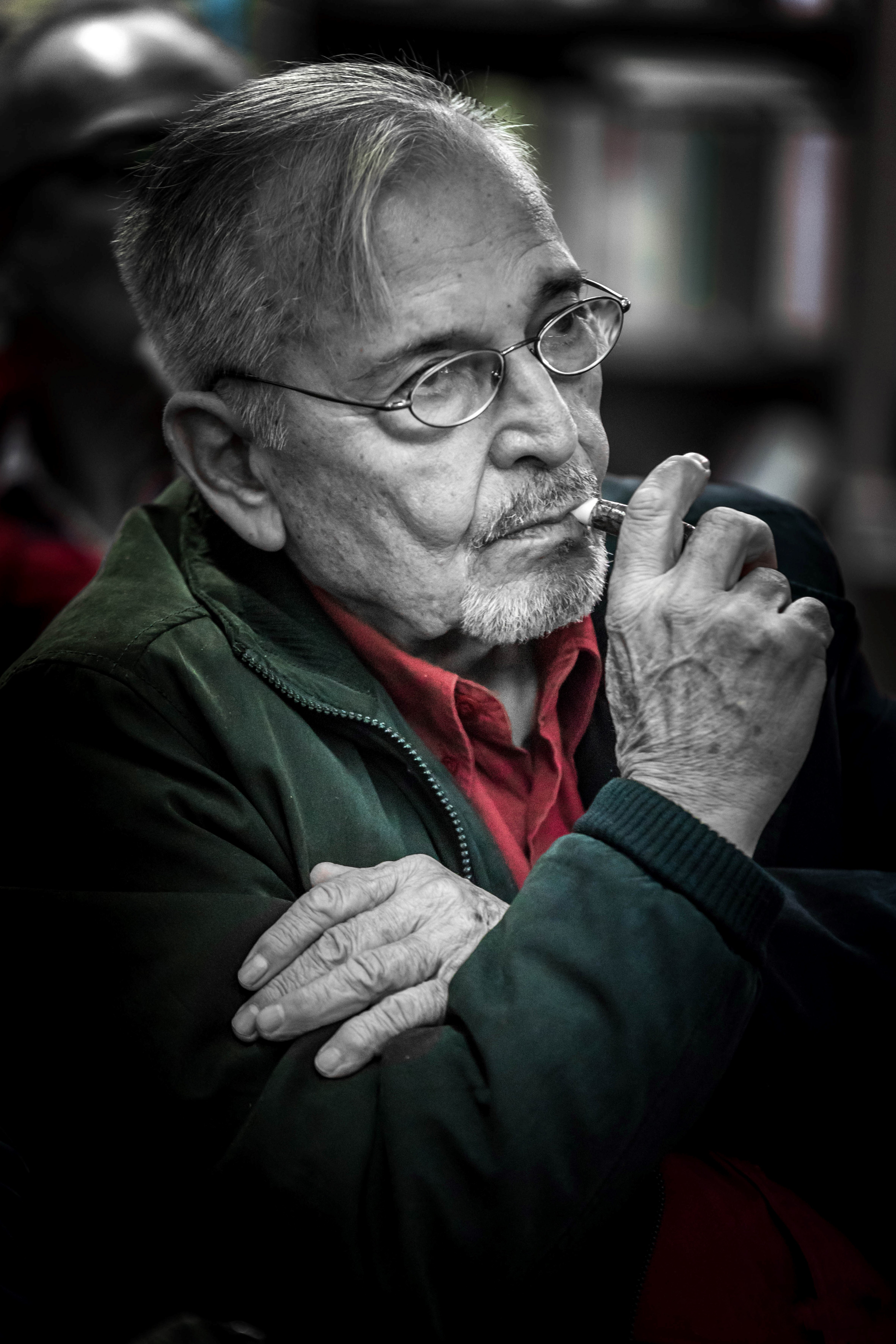

Stratis Haviaras (June 28, 1935 – March 3, 2020) was a bilingual writer of literary works in English and Greek, known in the U.S. for his novels When the Tree Sings (shortlisted for the Natiοnal Book Award and named an ALA Notable book), and The Heroic Age. Both were critically acclaimed in the American press, and were translated into many languages. He also founded and edited the literary journals Arion’s Dolphin, Erato and Harvard Review.

== Early life and education ==
Haviaras’s parents were refugees from Asia Minor who settled in Nea Kios (Argos) when it was founded in 1927. As a child he experienced the horrors of World War II. When he was 9, the Nazis executed his father, Christos, for his participation in the resistance, while his mother, Georgia Hatzikyriakos, was sent to a concentration camp in Germany. Subsequently the family house was demolished by the occupying forces. After finishing grammar school, Haviaras started working in the construction trades. In battling the twin obstacles of Attention Deficit Disorder and dyslexia, his love for writing found ways to persevere. He began to write poems and plays at age 13.

A milestone in his engagement with the literary world was his acquaintance, starting in 1957, with Kimon Friar, a distinguished translator into English of The Odyssey: a Modern Sequel by Nikos Kazantzakis, whom he met in Athens. Recognizing Haviaras’s passion for literature and writing, Friar invited him to travel to the United States to assist him in the translation of Kazantzakis’s Salvatores Dei: Spiritual exercises, and reading of essays on US arts over The Voice of America radio, and in the typing of archival material. Through Friar, Haviaras met Arthur Miller and Marilyn Monroe, Tennessee Williams, William Inge, among others. During his stay in the U.S. he also studied mechanical drawing at the Manhattan Technological Institute in New York, and machine design at the Jefferson School of Commerce in Charlottesville, Virginia, where he lived with relatives, working in the evenings in a Greek restaurant. At the University of Virginia, he met William Faulkner and worked with the young writer Richard Fariña, three years before his death.

== Career ==
=== First publications in Greek ===
Haviaras first appeared in the Greek letters with the dramatic monologue "The Rusty Nail" (Kainouria Epochi, Summer 1959), later performed in The Actors Studio in New York. Upon his return to Greece in April 1961, he found work in the US Airbase in Athens. That same year he met the author, Katerina Plassara, with whom he traveled to France, Germany and Scandinavia, writing plays. In 1963 he published his first collection of poems, Η κυρία με την πυξίδα (Lady with a Compass) and for the next few years he worked as a supervising engineer in the construction of the Achelous River hydroelectric dam. His second book of poetry, Βερολίνο (Berlin), was published in 1965. During Greece’s political turmoil, which culminated in the military takeover of the government in April, 1967, Haviaras participated in pro-democracy rallies in Athens (and later in Cambridge, Massachusetts). His next collection of poems Η νύχτα του ξυλοπόδαρου (Night of the Stiltwalker), amply reflects his opposition to totalitarian rule – it was confiscated by the police soon after it appeared in the bookstores. In Athens, in the autumn of 1966 Haviaras found work as a draftsman in The Architects Collaborative (TAC), founded by Walter Gropius. There he met the architect Gail Flynn, whom he married in 1967. That year he moved with her to the United States.

=== Harvard ===
In Cambridge, Massachusetts, Haviaras worked as a clerk at Harvard’s Widener Library and joined The Committee for the Restoration of the Democratic Government in Greece, founded by members of the academic community. Soon he became editor and one of the speakers of its Sunday program, The Voice of Greece, broadcasting over WILD Radio Boston against the military dictatorship in Greece. Following a complaint by “Twenty Greek-American businessmen,” the Federal Communications Commission imposed the submission of translated texts from Greek to English and vice versa 96 hours before broadcasting, in essence silencing the program. The Committee continued its activities with Eleutheria, a monthly publication. In 1971 Haviaras joined a think tank formed in Cambridge by members of the organization Δημοκρατική Άμυνα (Democratic Defense), which operated underground in Greece. As its representative from America, Haviaras travelled to Bonn, Germany in August of that year to participate in an international conference aimed at the restoration of democracy in Greece. While working at Harvard, Haviaras attended courses in literature and history at the university’s evening and summer programs. He completed his undergraduate and postgraduate studies in literature and creative writing respectively (BA 1973, MFA 1976) at the low residency program of Goddard College in Vermont. At Goddard he met many writers, including Raymond Carver, John Irving, and Richard Ford, and he launched Arion's Dolphin, a hand-stitched poetry journal.

1973 was a landmark year for his literary career. He began writing in English, and many of his poems appeared in literary journals such as Iowa Review, Ploughshares, Dickinson Review, and Kayak. In 1976 his first poetry collection in English, Crossing the River Twice was published by the Cleveland State University Poetry Center.

At Harvard he was successively promoted to positions of greater responsibility until in 1974 he was appointed Curator of the Woodberry Poetry Room and the Henry Weston Farnsworth Room, two specialized collections in the Harvard College Library system. In 1976 Haviaras began to live with Heather Cole, a librarian at Harvard. The couple was married in 1990 at the suggestion of their daughter, Elektra Haviaras (b. 1981).

In 1979, Simon & Schuster published his novels When the Tree Sings and in 1984, The Heroic Age.

As Curator of the Poetry and Farnsworth Rooms, Haviaras was responsible for selecting works of poetry from the English-speaking world and making studio recordings of poets reading from their own work. Equally importantly, he organized weekly gatherings, book presentations, poetry readings and publications. In 1984 and for the next 24 years he taught a successful novel-writing workshop at Harvard’s summer program, and with his assistant, the poet Michael Milburn, he edited and published large selections from sound recordings (Vladimir Nabokov at Harvard and Seamus Heaney at Harvard), and the literary magazine ERATO. In 1992 he launched Harvard Review, a major publishing effort, now edited by Christina Thompson and associates.

After completing 40 years of service at the University, a fund for an annual poetry lecture to honor Stratis Haviaras was established in the Department of English and American Literature and Language by a grant from film maker Robert Gardner and a donation from the poet Elizabeth Gray.

=== Return to Greece and the Greek language ===
Haviaras retired from the library at Harvard in the year 2000 but continued to teach in the Summer Program until 2008, completing 40 years of service, when he took up permanent residence in Athens. As a writer, he returned to the Greek language with AXNA, a novel (Kedros, 2014) and the teaching of creative writing at the European Center for the Translation of Literature (EKEMEL), of which he was President in 2000, and the National Book Center of Greece (EKEBI). He also served as Vice President of the Greek Authors Society (2011–2013), and since 2015 he coordinated a creative writing workshop at the Center for Hellenic Studies of Harvard University in Nafplion, Greece. Since 2013 he had been publishing poems and translations of poetry in the Athens journal Ta Poetika and his short stories and memoir~~e~~s in oanagnostis.gr an e-magazine for the book, of whose editorial board he was a member.

Haviaras was the translator into English of C.P. Cavafy The Canon (Hermes Publishing 2000, Center for Hellenic Studies, Harvard University Press, 2007) and collaborated with others in the translation of works by Seamus Heaney and Charles Simic into Greek.

== Works ==
=== Poetry ===
- Η κυρία με την πυξίδα, privately published, 1963
- Βερολίνο, Fexis, 1965
- Η νύχτα του Ξυλοπόδαρου, privately published, 1967
- Νεκροφάνεια, Kedros, 1972
- Crossing the River Twice, Cleveland State University, 1976
- Millennial Afterlives, a retrospective, Wells College Press, 2000
- Duty Free Desiderata, Siera Press, 2000

=== Novels ===
- When the Tree Sings, Simon & Schuster 1979, Ballantine 1980, Sidwick & Jackson U.K. 1979, Picador U.K. 1980
- Όταν τραγουδούσαν τα δέντρα (When the Tree Sings in Greek), Hermes 1980, Kastaniotis 1999
- The Heroic Age, Simon & Schuster 1984, Penguin 1985, Methuen U.K. 1984, King Penguin U.K. 1985
- Τα ηρωικά χρόνια (The Heroic Age in Greek) Bell 1984, Kastaniotis 1999
- Πορφυρό και μαύρο νήμα (The Telling), Kedros, 2007
- Άχνα (Ahna), Kedros, 2014

=== Translations – Collaborations ===
- Into English: C.P. Cavafy, The Canon, Hermes 2004, CHS Harvard 2007
- Into Greek: Seamus Heaney, Το Αλφάδι (The Spirit Level), with Manolis Savvidis, Theodosis Nikolaou and Soti Triantafillou, Hermes, 1999
- Seamus Heaney, Αλφάβητα (Alphabets), with Giorgos and Manolis Savvidis, engravings by Dimitri Hatzi, ISTOS, 2000
- Charles Simic, The Music of the Stars, with Dino Siotis, The Society of Dekata, 2010.

=== Editor ===
- Eleutheria, 1970–1973
- Arion’s Dolphin, 1971–1976
- 35 Post-War Greek Poets, Arion’s Dolphin (special issue), 1973
- Kiss; a collaboration, with Paul Hannigan, John Batki and William Corbett (special issue), Arion’s Dolphin 1976
- Sylvia Plath Reading her Poetry (audio), Caedmon 1980
- Ploughshares, International Writing Issue, 1985
- ERATO, 1986–1991, with Michael Milburn
- Harvard Review,1991-2000
- The Poet’s Voice; Poets Reading and Commenting Upon their Works (audio), Harvard University Press, 1978
- Vladimir Nabokov at Harvard (audio), with Michael Milburn, Poetry Room 1987
- Seimus Heaney at Harvard (audio), with Michael Milburn, Poetry Room 1987
- Seimus Heaney; a Celebration, a Harvard Review Monograph, 1995
- Charlie Simic at Large, (special Issue) Harvard Review, 1997

=== Interviews in newspapers and periodicals ===
- Dan Georgakas, «An Interview with Stratis Haviaras." Journal of the Hellenic Diaspora 8, no. 4 (Winter 1981): 73-82.
- Patrick Skene Catling, “Poetic Fruits of War” The Sunday Telegraph

== Distinctions ==
- When the tree sings, Short List, US National Book
- When the tree sings & The Heroic Age, Notable books, American Library Association
- The newspaper Guardian selected the novel When the Tree Sings as one of the 10 most important political novels of the 20th century.
- Literary Award for Stratis Haviaras Services to Other Poets at Harvard, PEN New England Award.
- Robert Gardner’s Funding of The Annual Stratis Haviaras Lectures at the English Dep., Harvard

== Sources ==
- Harvard Library
- Harvard Review
- Ploughshares
- oanagnostis.gr
- Theodora D. Patrona, (2017). Return Narratives: Ethnic Space in Late-Twentieth-Century Greek American and Italian American Literature, Rowman & Littlefield
- Stratis Haviaras interviews in Greek newspapers and books' periodicals
