= The Saviors of God =

Essay by Nikos Kazantzakis

- Author: Nikos Kazantzakis
- Language: Greek
- Publisher: Anayennisi
- Publication date: 1944
- ISBN: 1476706824

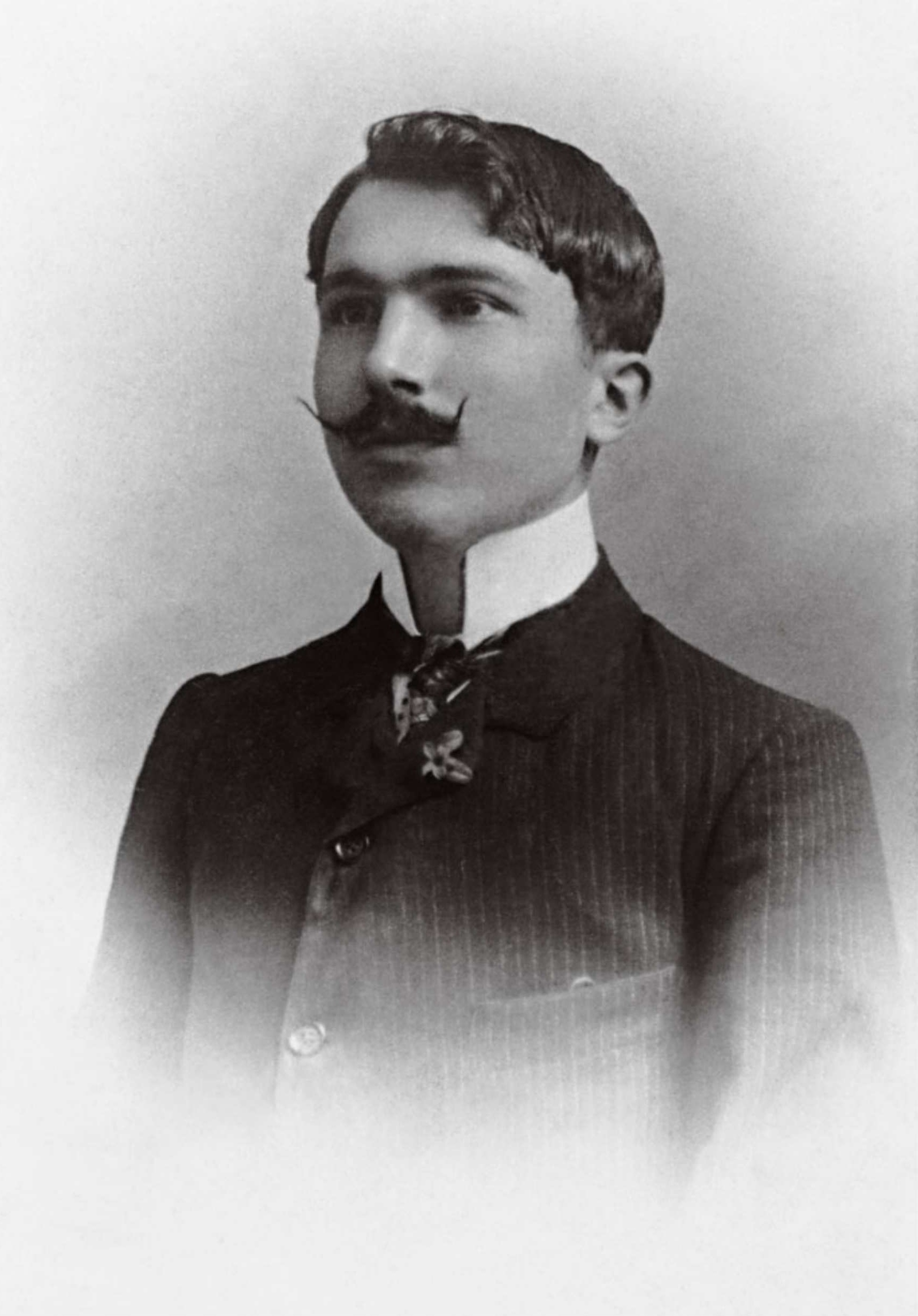
Nikos Kazantzakis in 1904

Ascesis: The Saviors of God (Greek and Latin: Ασκητική. Salvatores dei) is a series of "spiritual exercises" written by Greek author Nikos Kazantzakis. It was first written between 1922 and 1923, while staying in Vienna and Berlin, and subsequently published in 1927 in the Athenian magazine Anayennisi (Renaissance). The text was later revised on various occasions and reached its final state in 1944.

== Presentation ==
The author first presents a prologue. Given the sacred tone of the book, which strives to go beyond philosophy and metaphysics, this introduction is better understood as an admonition. The first words summarize the undercurrent of The Saviors of God: "We came from an abyss of darkness; we end in an abyss of darkness: the interval of light between one and another we name life."

Kazantzakis thought that there are two streams in life: the first one runs toward ascesis, synthesis, life and immortality, while the second one runs towards dissolution, matter, death. However, both streams are part of the universe, and being so, sacred. One of Kazantzakis' main concerns was what force drives the uncreated to the created. As opposition seems to be intrinsic to life and infinite, human beings should strive to ascend to a harmonic view of these oppositions, to be a guide for thought and action.

He borrowed ideas from Nietzsche, Bergson, Buddha, and Marx.

== Significance ==
According to Kimon Friar, the English translator of many of Kazantzakis' writings, The Saviors of God occupies a central role in the work of the Greek author. In the second part of his lengthy introduction to The Odyssey: A Modern Sequel, Friar notes:

Just before Kazantzakis began to write the Odyssey, he completed a small book, perhaps best titled The Saviors of God and subtitled Spiritual Exercises, where in a passionate and poetic style, yet in systematic fashion, he set down the philosophy embedded not only in the Odyssey but in everything he has written, for he was a man of one overwhelming vision, striving to give it shape in all the forms he could master, in epic, drama, novel, travelogue, criticism, translation, and even political action.

== Notes ==
- Kazantzakis, Nikos. The Odyssey: A Modern Sequel. Trans. Kimon Friar. New York: Clarion / Simon and Schuster, 1958.
- Kazantzakis, Nikos. The Saviors of God. Spiritual Exercises. Trans. Kimon Friar. New York: Touchstone / Simon and Schuster, 1960. ISBN 0-671-20232-4

== See also ==
- Nikos Kazantzakis
- The Odyssey: A Modern Sequel
