= The Last Temptation of Christ =

The Last Temptation of Christ may refer to:

- The Last Temptation of Christ (novel), a 1955 novel by Nikos Kazantzakis
- The Last Temptation of Christ (film), a 1988 adaptation of the novel, directed by Martin Scorsese

== See also ==
- Temptation of Christ, an event depicted in the gospels of Matthew, Mark, and Luke
