= Jonathan Griffin =

British military theorist, poet, and translator (born 1906)

- Born: 1906
- Died: 1990 (aged 83–84)
- Occupations: Writer, Translator
- Writing career
- Notable works: Glass Houses and Modern War (1938), In Earthlight: Selected Poems (1995)

Jonathan Griffin (1906–1990) was a British military and strategic theorist, poet, and translator.

Griffin was educated at Radley College, a public school in Oxfordshire (1920-1924), and New College, Oxford (1924-1928). During the 1930s he wrote on military affairs, with a particular concentration on the implications of strategic bombing for the United Kingdom's deterrence and defence posture.

During the Second World War he served as the director of BBC European Intelligence. In this role, he is claimed to have originated the development of what became the "V-for-Victory" hand sign, after letters from Europe indicated the need for a "symbol of resistance and liberation". The sign itself was originated by Victor de Laveleye, who proposed it on the BBC's Radio Belgique in January 1941. It was later adopted by Winston Churchill.

After the war, Griffin oversaw cultural and educational matters at the British Embassy in Paris. In 1951 he left the Foreign Office to write poetry and plays. His play, The Hidden King, was performed at the 1957 Edinburgh Festival. Seven books of his poetry were published between 1957 and 1983. Meanwhile, he supported himself by translating from the French, Portuguese, and German.

Griffin died in 1990. A selection of his poems was published posthumously, in 1995.

== Works ==
- Alternative to Rearmament (New York and London: Macmillan, 1936)
- Glass Houses and Modern War (London: Chatto and Windus, 1938)
- In Earthlight: Selected Poems (London: Menard Press, 1995)

=== Translations ===
- Jean Giono, The Horseman on the Roof (New York: Alfred A. Knopf, 1953)
- Nikos Kazantzakis, The Greek Passion (New York: Simon & Schuster, 1953)
  - Another edition as Christ Recrucified (Oxford: Bruno Cassirer, 1954)
- Charles de Gaulle, War Memoirs, vol. 1 (London: Collins, 1955)
- Nikos Kazantzakis, Freedom and Death (Oxford: Bruno Cassirer, 1956)
- Pierre Courthion, Flemish Painting (London: Thames and Hudson, 1958)
- Jean Rostand, Can Man be modified? (London: Secker & Warburg, 1959)
- Henri Queffélec, Frontier of the Unknown (London: Secker & Warburg, 1960)
- Germain Bazin, Baroque & Rococo (London: Thames & Hudson, 1964)
- Suzanne Lilar, Aspects of Love in Western Society (London: Thames & Hudson [1965])
- André Adrien Chastel, The Studios and Styles of the Renaissance: Italy, 1460-1500 (London: Thames & Hudson, 1966)
- Fernando Pessoa, Selected Poems (Oxford: Carcanet Press, 1971)
- Jean-Louis Barrault, Memories for Tomorrow (London: Thames and Hudson, 1974)
- Heinrich Von Kleist, The Prince of Homburg for the Royal Exchange, Manchester in 1976.
- Robert Bresson, Notes on Cinematography (New York; London: Urizen Books; Distributed by Pluto Press, 1977)
