= The Greek Passion =

Opera in four acts by Bohuslav Martinů

- by Bohuslav Martinů
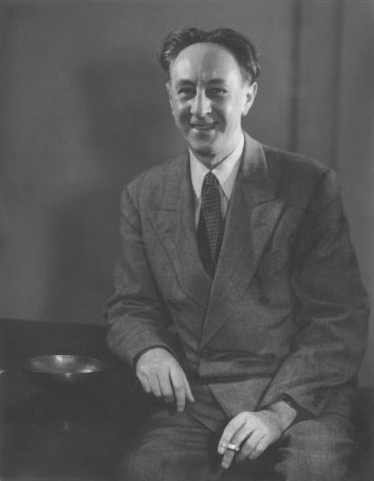
- Martinů in 1945
- Librettist: Martinů
- Language: English
- Based on: Christ Recrucified by Nikos Kazantzakis
- Premiere: 19 June 1961; Opernhaus Zürich

The Greek Passion (Czech Řecké pašije; Halbreich No. 372) is an opera in four acts by Bohuslav Martinů. The English-language libretto, by the composer, is based on Jonathan Griffin's translation of the novel Christ Recrucified by Nikos Kazantzakis.

== Background ==
The Greek Passion exists today in two complete versions that differ from each other both musically and dramatically. Martinů wrote the original version from 1954 to 1957. He offered this original version of the opera in 1957 to the Royal Opera House, Covent Garden, where the music director, Rafael Kubelík, and the general administrator, David Webster, had approved the score for production. However, the company then demurred on the production after intervention by Sir Arthur Bliss. Following the rejection of the first version as being too radical first by the Royal Opera House and then by the Zurich Opera and the Viennese publisher Universal Edition, Martinů reworked the opera during 1958-59 and produced the second version.

The second version received its premiere at the Zurich Opera House on 9 June 1961 after Martinů's death in 1959. It was first produced in the UK at Welsh National Opera on 29 April 1981, conducted by Sir Charles Mackerras. The first US production was in 1981, at the Metropolitan Opera, in a production by the Indiana University School of Music. The first version was later restored under the supervision of Aleš Březina. The premiere of the restored version was at the Bregenz Festival on 20 July 1999 and this production was later performed at Covent Garden in April 2000, and first performed in the Czech Republic in January 2005. The work's first performance in Greece itself was in Thessaloniki in 2005, using a Greek translation by Ioanna Manoledaki, based closely on the wording of Kazantzakis's novel; the conductor was Christian von Gehren. The opera in its first version became the first by Martinů to be presented at the Salzburg Festival in the summer of 2023, in a production of the revised version by Simon Stone sung in English, it was conducted by Maxime Pascal with Sebastian Kohlepp as Manolios and Sara Jakubiak as Katerina. Although still rarely performed, the opera received an acclaimed new production in its original version at the Staatsoper Hannover in April 2025, directed by Barbora Horáková. After several postponements due to the COVID-19 pandemic, the production marked a significant revival, with Christopher Sokolowski in the role of Manolios.

== Roles ==
Role	Voice type	Premiere Cast, 9 June 1961 (Conductor: Paul Sacher)
Manolios, a shepherd	tenor	Glade Peterson
Katerina, a young widow	soprano or mezzo-soprano	Sandra Warfield
Panait, Katerina's lover	tenor	Zbyslaw Wozniak
Grigoris, priest of Lycovrissi	bass-baritone	James Pease
Fotis, priest of the refugees	bass-baritone	Heinz Borst
Yannakos, a pedlar	tenor	Fritz Peter
Kostandis, a café owner	baritone	Robert Kerns
Lenio, betrothed to Manolios	soprano	Jean Cook
Ladas, an old miser	spoken	Fritz Lanius
The Patriacheas, an elder	bass-baritone	Siegfried Tappolet
Michelis, son of the Patriacheas	tenor	Ernst-August Steinhoff
Nikolios, a young shepherd	soprano	Robert Thomas
Andonis, a barber	spoken	Leonhard Päckl
An old woman	contralto	Adelhait Schaer
A voice in the crowd	baritone	
Despinio, a refugee	soprano	Mirjam Lutomirski
An old man, a refugee	bass	Werner Ernst
Chorus: Villagers, refugees

== Synopsis ==
The setting is Lykovrissi, a Greek village, where a performance of the Passion Play is scheduled to occur at Easter. As the story proceeds, the villagers cast in the play take on the personalities of their religious characters.

=== Act 1 ===
The priest Grigoris distributes the roles for the following year's performance of the Passion Play. Café owner Kostandis is allotted James, the pedlar Yannakos Peter, Michelis is given John, shepherd Manolios is selected as Christ; and Katerina, a widow, is chosen to play Mary Magdalene. Panait, her lover, is given the role of Judas much against his wish. The actors are blessed and exhorted to live the life of their roles in the coming year. Manolios is engaged to Lenio who asks him when they are to be married, but he cannot think about marriage any longer. The villagers think of their respective roles and about how they correspond to their lives.

At dawn, singing is heard and a group of Greek refugees arrives in Lykovrissi from a village destroyed by the Turks, led by their priest, Fotis. Father Grigoris is concerned about the welfare and safety of his fellow villagers and of possible conflicts. One female refugee dies from hunger, but Father Grigoris blames the death on cholera and uses this to expel the refugees from the village. Only Katerina offers them practical assistance, but Manolios, Yannakos, Kostandis and Michelis take her lead, find food, and show them the nearby Sarakina mountain where the refugees may rest.

=== Act 2 ===
The moral strength of the 'apostles' is tested. Katerina has fallen in love with Manolios and reveals this to Yannakos. The elder Ladas talks to the simple Yannakos about profiting from the refugees. The latter falls for the dream of wealth rushes off to the refugee camp of wants to relieve the refugees of their possessions.

Meeting Manolios he warns him about Katerina who then meets Manolios at a well where they reveal their mutual attraction, but Manolios rejects her and she is desolate.

Yannakos views the ceremony of the laying of the foundation stone of a new village on the mountainside, where an old man asks to be buried along with the bones of his ancestors. Yannakos, shamed by the poverty and welcome of the refugees, confesses to Fotis that he has come to cheat the refugees, but now gives all his money to help them.

=== Act 3 ===
Manolios has been dreaming: of Lenio's reproaches, of Grigoris' exhortations to be worthy of his role, and of Katerina as the Holy Virgin. Lenio enters as he wakens to ask for one last time about their wedding, only for Manolios to reply ambiguously. When Manolios has left, Lenio is lured back by the piping of the shepherd Nikolios.

Manolios convinces Katerina that their love must be only spiritual, in the same manner as Jesus and Mary Magdalene. She decides to sell her goats to help the refugees.

Manolios appeals to the villagers to help the refugees, and is well received. However the village elders see a threat to their authority. Manolios is gaining a greater spiritual hold over the villagers, and the elders devise a plan to drive Manolios out of the village.

=== Act 4 ===
During Lenio and Nikolios's wedding feast Father Grigoris warns them about the preaching of Manolios and excommunicates him. Michelis, Yannakos and Kostandis stay loyal to Manolios. Manolios appears and proclaims that the world's suffering will bring bloodshed. The refugees come down from the mountain in a state of misery. While Manolios preaches charity towards the refugees, Grigoris incites the villagers and Panait kills Manolios on the church steps as refugees enter. The villagers and the refugees mourn Manolios. Fotis leads the refugees away, in search of a new home.

== Recordings ==
Original version:

- sung in English - Christopher Ventris (Manolios), Esa Ruuttunen (Grigoris), Nina Stemme (Katerina), Egils Silins (Fotis); Vienna Symphony Orchestra; Ulf Schirmer, conductor - Koch Schwann 3-6590-2 (recorded at Bregenz Festival, June 1999)
- sung in English - Rolf Romei (Manolios), Wilfried Zelinka (Grigoris), Dshamilja Kaiser (Katerina), Markus Butter (Fotis); Graz Philharmonic Orchestra & Opera Chorus; Dirk Kaftan, conductor - Oehms Classics OC 967 (recorded in Graz 2017)

Revised version:

- sung in English - John Mitchinson (Manolios), John Tomlinson (Grigoris), Helen Field (Katerina), Geoffrey Moses (Fotis); Czech Philharmonic Chorus; Brno State Philharmonic Orchestra; Sir Charles Mackerras, conductor - Supraphon 1116 3611/2 (recorded Stadion, Brno, 1-6 June 1981)
- sung in English - DVD of 1999 television film using the 1981 studio recording as soundtrack (with minor cuts) - John Mitchinson, John Tomlinson, Helen Field, Geoffrey Moses; Prague Philharmonic Choir, Kühn Children´s Chorus & Brno Philharmonic Orchestra; Sir Charles Mackerras, conductor - Supraphon DVD SU70149, Release Date: 12 Nov 2007
- sung in Czech - Vilém Přibyl (Manolios), Jaroslav Horáček (Grigoris), Eva Dĕpoltová (Katerina), Richard Novák (Fotis); Czech Radio Chorus and Symphony Orchestra; Libor Pešek, conductor - Supraphon SU 3984-2 (recorded at Rudolfinum, Prague, 29 Sept - 1 Oct 1981, pub. 1983, reissued 2010)

== Sources ==
- Smaczny, Jan, The Greek Passion in 'The New Grove Dictionary of Opera', ed. Stanley Sadie (London, 1992) ISBN 0-333-73432-7
