= He Who Must Die =

1957 film

- Film poster
- Directed by: Jules Dassin
- Written by: Ben Barzman; Jules Dassin
- Produced by: Henri Bérard
- Starring: Jean Servais; Carl Möhner; Grégoire Aslan
- Cinematography: Gilbert Chain; Jacques Natteau
- Edited by: Roger Dwyre; Pierre Gillette
- Production companies: Indusfilms; Prima Film; Cinétel; Filmsonor
- Distributed by: Cinédis
- Release date: 4 May 1957
- Running time: 122 minutes
- Countries: France; Italy
- Language: French

He Who Must Die (French: Celui qui doit mourir) is a 1957 French-Italian film directed by Jules Dassin. It is based on the novel Christ Recrucified (also published as The Greek Passion) by Nikos Kazantzakis. It was entered into the 1957 Cannes Film Festival.

== Plot ==
In a Turkish-occupied Greek village shortly after World War I, villagers put on a Passion Play, with ordinary people taking the roles of Jesus, Peter, Judas, etc. Staging the play leads to them rebelling against their Turkish rulers in a way that mirrors Jesus's story.

== Cast ==
- Jean Servais as Photis
- Carl Möhner as Lukas
- Grégoire Aslan as Agha
- Gert Fröbe as Patriarcheos
- Teddy Bilis as Hadji Nikolis
- René Lefèvre as Yannakos
- Lucien Raimbourg as Kostandis
- Melina Mercouri as Katerina
- Roger Hanin as Pannagotaros
- Pierre Vaneck as Manolios
- Dimos Starenios as Ladas
- Nicole Berger as Mariori
- Maurice Ronet as Michelis
- Fernand Ledoux as Grigoris
- Joe Dassin as Benos

== Reception ==
The film received a generally positive response. It was favorably reviewed in Time and The New Yorker, and received awards in communist eastern Europe (Dassin was well known for his left-wing views), and even some liberal Catholics praised it. Bosley Crowther for The New York Times described it as "brutally realistic", praising the "daring sort of candor and relentless driving" in the way it works out the logic of the plot, and he also praised all of the cast.
