= Captain Michalis =

Book by Nikos Kazantzakis

- Cover of the second edition in Greek, Athens 1955
- Author: Nikos Kazantzakis
- Original title: Ο Καπετάν Μιχάλης
- Translator: Jonathan Griffin
- Language: Greek
- Publication date: 1953
- Publication place: Greece
- English publication date: 1956
- Media type: Print (Hardback & Paperback)
- Pages: 472 (Paperback)
- ISBN: 0-85181-012-8
- OCLC: 423492

Captain Michalis (Greek: Ο Καπετάν Μιχάλης) is a 1953 novel by the Greek writer Nikos Kazantzakis. In the English, German, and French translations (as well as many others) it is known as Freedom or Death. The writer was influenced by his early years on the island of Crete and uses explicit Cretan Greek words and the Cretan idiom in a way that preserves it untouched. It is one of the most widely read books of modern Greek literature which has been translated and published in several languages.

== Plot ==
The story is set during the Cretan revolution of 1889. The protagonist, Captain Michalis, a fierce and indomitable warrior, has sworn to be black-clad, unshaven and unsmiling until Crete is liberated. But when he meets Emine, the wife of his blood brother, Nuri Bey, he is possessed by "a demon" that despite his efforts, he cannot get out of his mind.

While Captain Michalis fights his demon, Nuri Bey duels Manousakas, a brother of Captain Michalis, to avenge the death of his father, who was killed by their brother Costaros years ago, and kills him; himself, however, is injured at his genitals. His wound heals, but the damage is irreversible and he kills himself, unable to bear the scorn and pity of Emine (who has meanwhile become Captain Polixigis' lover) for his impotence. The news of his death adds to the already tense atmosphere in Megalo Kastro, where daily reports of skirmishes and riots between Greeks and Turks arrive throughout the island.

At the instigation of the aghas, Turkish soldiers pour into the streets of the city, slaughtering and burning. A few days later, the revolution breaks out. The war is raging and the Turks are besieging the monastery of Afentis Christos. At the same time, Emine is preparing to be baptized a Christian and marry Polixigis. But Nuri Bey's family kidnaps her and Captain Michalis, on the most critical night of the siege, leaves the monastery to save her. He succeeds and sends her to an aunt's house. In his absence, however, the Turks manage to set fire to the monastery and Captain Michalis kills Emine to calm down and get rid of his regrets about the monastery.

A little later, Kosmas, son of Costaros and nephew of Captain Michalis, arrives in Crete, bringing the message of capitulation to the rebels. One after another, the captains lay down their arms, but Captain Michalis refuses to submit. Kosmas goes to his lair to convince him to hand over his weapons, but in the end he stays as well, as Crete and his father Costaros wake up inside him. In the heat of the battle, he understands that Captain Michalis has now been freed from all fear and hope. Soon, uncle and nephew fall dead in the last raid of the Turks.

== Explanation of the novel's title ==
It is thought that the book's title honours Kazantzakis' father Michalis Kazantzakis, by whom the writer was inspired. The word Captain is not used in its naval rank sense, but as the title of leader of a guerilla warfare group (the writer's father Michalis Kazantzakis was a leader of such a group, hence the title. Kazantzakis says this in his book "Report to Greco").

Freedom or Death was added as a subtitle to the second edition in Greek released by Difros publishers in Athens in 1955 and was the preferred English (US) title. In the UK the book was published as Freedom and Death, which were the last words in the book. The expression comes from the Greek national motto "Freedom or Death" (Eleftheria i thanatos), derived from the Greek War of Independence and used by Cretan rebels such as the book's protagonist. The "or" was knowingly replaced with "and" in the ending text by Kazantzakis.

== Publication ==
French 1966 edition

First edition in Ukrainian, 1965

Captain Michalis has been translated into many languages, including Turkish.

- 1954, Germany, (titled "Freiheit oder Tod", translated by Helmut von den Steinen), Herbig, Berlin.
- 1955, Sweden, (titled "Frihet eller död", translated into Swedish by Börje Knös), Ljus, Stockholm.
- 1955, Norway, (titled "Frihet eller død", translated into Norwegian by Leif Kristiansen), Tanum, Oslo.
- 1955, Denmark, (titled "Frihed eller død", translated into Danish by Karl Hornelund), Jespersen og Pio, Copenhagen.
- 1955, Netherlands, (titled "Kapitein Michalis", translated into Dutch by H.C.M. Edelman), De Fontein, Utrecht.
- 1955, Finland (titled "Vapaus tai Kuolema" translated into Finnish by Elvi Sinervo), Kustannusosakeyhtiö Tammi, Helsinki.
- 1955, United States, (titled "Freedom or Death, a novel", translated by Jonathan Griffin), Simon and Schuster, New York.
- 1956, Great Britain (titled "Freedom and Death, a novel", translated by Jonathan Griffin), Bruno Cassirer, Oxford ISBN 0-85181-012-8.
- 1956, France (titled "La Liberté ou La Mort", translated by Gisèle Prassinos and Pierre Fridas), Plon, Paris.
- 1956, Yugoslavia (titled "Kapitan Mihalis", translated into Slovenian by Jose Udović), : Cankarjevna, Ljubljana.
- 1957, Iceland (titled "Frelsið eða dauðann", translated into Icelandic by Skúli Bjarkan), Almenna bókafélagið, Reykjavík.
- 1957, Argentina (titled "Libertad o muerte", translated into Spanish by Rosa Chacel), Carlos Lohlé, Buenos Aires.
- 1958, Portugal (titled "Liberdade ou morte", translated into Portuguese by Maria Franco), Cor, Lisbon.
- 1958, Hungary (titled "Mihálisz kapitány", translated into Hungarian by Abody Béla), Európa, Budapest.
- 1959, Italy (titled "Capitan Michele", translated by Edvige Levi Gunalachi), Martello, Milan.
- 1960, Poland (titled "Kapitan Michał", translated into Polish by Katarzyna Witwicka), Czytelnik, Warsaw.
- 1960, Czechoslovakia (titled "Kapitán Michalis" translated into Czech by František Štuřík and Mariana Stříbrná), Československý spisovatel, Prague.
- 1961, Bulgaria (titled "Kapitan Mikhalis", translated into Bulgarian by Georgi Kufov), Narodna Kultura, Sofia.
- 1963, Israel (titled "Herut O Mavet" - "חרות או מוות"), Am Oved, Tel Aviv .
- 1965, USSR (titled "Kapitan Mihalis: Svoboda abo smert", translated into Ukrainian by Ivan Hrechanivs'ky, Viktoriia and Iannis Mochos), Vydavnytstvo Khudozhn'oi Literatury "Dnipro", Kiev.
- 1967, Turkey, (titled "Ya hürriyet ya ölüm (Kapetan Mihalis)", translated by Nevzat Hatko), Ararat, Istanbul.
- 1973, Iran, (titled "Azadi ya marg", translated into Persian by Muhammad Qazi), Khvarazmi, Tehran.
- 1973, Albania (titled, "Ja vdekje, ja liri", translated into Albanian by Enver Fico), Shtepia Botuese "Naim Frasheri" Tirana.
- 1976, Egypt, (titled "al-Hurriya wa-l-maut"), al-Hay'a, Cairo.
- 1982, China, (titled "Zi you huo si wang", translated into Chinese by Wang Zhenji yi), Wai guo wen xue chu ban she, Peking.
- 2002, Lithuania (titled "Kapitonas Michalis", translated into Lithuanian by Diana Bučiūtė), Vaga Publishers, Vilnius.
- 2013, Brazil (titled "O Capitão Michális (Liberdade ou Morte)", translated into Portuguese by Silvia Ricardino), Grua, São Paulo.
- 2014, Croatia (titled "Sloboda ili smrt", translated into Croatian by Irena Gavranović Lukšić), Sandorf, Zagreb.
- 2021, Russia (titled "Капитан Михалис", translated into Russian by Victor Grigorievich Sokoluk), Wyrgorod, Moscow.
