= The Odyssey: A Modern Sequel =

Epic poem by Nikos Kazantzakis

The Odyssey: A Modern Sequel, is an epic poem by Greek poet and philosopher Nikos Kazantzakis, based on Homer's Odyssey. It is divided into twenty-four rhapsodies as is the original Odyssey and consists of 33,333 17-syllable verses. Kazantzakis began working on it in 1924 after he returned to Crete from Germany. Before finally publishing the poem in 1938 he had drafted seven different versions. Kazantzakis considered this his most important work. It was fully translated into English in 1958 by Kimon Friar.

== Synopsis ==
Odysseus returns to Ithaca and decides to undertake new adventures after he quickly becomes dissatisfied with his quiet family life and they too with his brutality. First he travels to Sparta to save Helen, the wife of the king of Sparta Menelaus, whose abduction by Paris had led to the Trojan War. He goes to Crete where a conspiracy dethrones the king. He is abandoned by Helen who runs off with a blonde barbarian and continues to Egypt, where again a workers' uprising takes place. He leaves again on a journey up the Nile eventually stopping at the lake-source. Upon arrival his companions set up camp and he climbs the mountain in order to concentrate on his god. Upon his return to the lake he sets up his city based on the commandments of his religion. The city is soon destroyed by an earthquake. Odysseus laments his failure to understand the true meaning of god with the sacrifice of his companions. His life transforms into that of an ascetic.

Odysseus meets Motherth (an incarnation of the Buddha), Kapetán Énas (English: Captain Sole, literally "Captain One", a Greek folk expression for people who are insubordinate and single-minded to a fault), alias Don Quixote, and an African village fisherman, alias Jesus. He travels further south in Africa while constantly spreading his religion and fighting the advances of death. Eventually he travels to Antarctica and lives with villagers for a year until an iceberg kills him. His death is glorious as it marks his rebirth and unification with the world.

== Themes ==
The Odyssey represents Kazantzakis' ideology and metaphysical concerns. A central theme is the importance of struggle for its own sake, as opposed to reaching a final goal.
