= Nikos Kazantzakis =

Greek writer and philosopher (1883–1957)

- Νίκος Καζαντζάκης
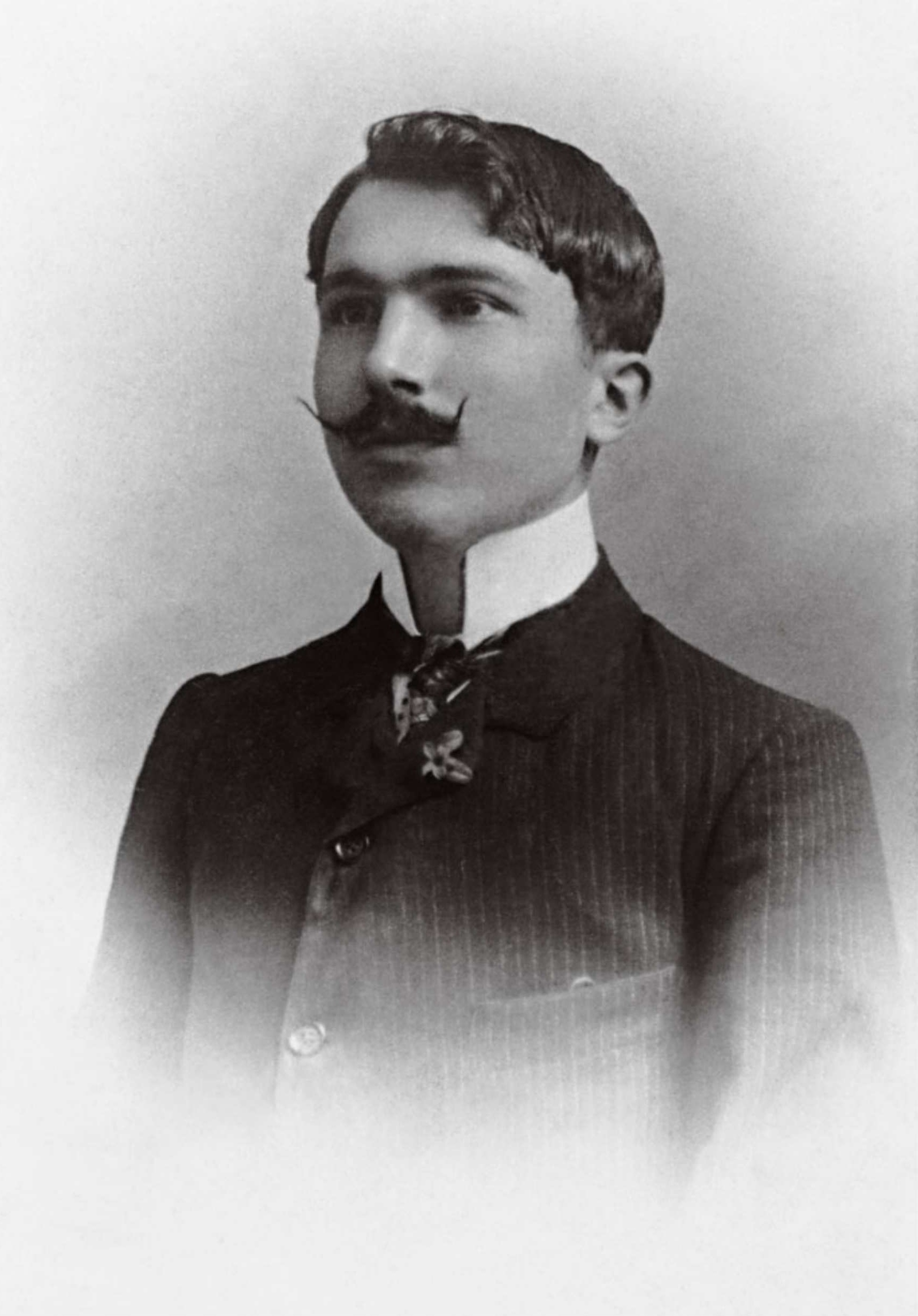
- Kazantzakis in 1904
- Born: 2 March (OS 18 February) 1883; Kandiye, Vilayet of Crete, Ottoman Empire (now Heraklion, Greece)
- Died: 26 October 1957 (aged 74); Freiburg im Breisgau, West Germany
- Resting place: Martinengo Bastion, Venetian Walls of Heraklion
- Education: University of Athens (1902–1906; J.D., 1906); University of Paris (1907–1909; DrE, 1909)
- Occupations: Poet, novelist, essayist, travel writer, philosopher, playwright, journalist, translator
- Spouses: Galateia Kazantzakis (m. 1911; div. 1926); Eleni Kazantzakis (m. 1945)
- Writing career
- Language: Modern Greek

Nikos Kazantzakis (/kæzænˈzækɪs/; Greek: Νίκος Καζαντζάκης [ˈnikos kazanˈd͡zakis]; 2 March [OS 18 February] 1883 – 26 October 1957) was a Greek writer, journalist, politician, poet and philosopher. Widely considered a giant of modern Greek literature, he was nominated for the Nobel Prize in Literature in nine different years, and remains the most translated Greek author worldwide.

Kazantzakis's novels include Zorba the Greek (published in 1946 as Life and Times of Alexis Zorbas), Christ Recrucified (1948), Captain Michalis (1950, translated as Freedom or Death), and The Last Temptation of Christ (1955). He also wrote plays, travel books, memoirs, and philosophical essays, such as The Saviors of God: Spiritual Exercises. His fame spread in the English-speaking world due to cinematic adaptations of Zorba the Greek (1964) and The Last Temptation of Christ (1988).

He also translated a number of notable works into Modern Greek, such as the Divine Comedy, Thus Spoke Zarathustra, On the Origin of Species, Homer's Iliad and Odyssey.

== Biography ==
Nikos Kazantzakis was born in the town of Kandiye (now Heraklion) in Crete, with origins from the village of Myrtia. Crete had not yet joined the modern Greek state (which had been established in 1832), and was still under the rule of the Ottoman Empire. Based on family records, Kazantzakis was born on 18 February 1883 (OS), in contrast to the census of Heraklion which listed his birthyear as 1881; this discrepancy was settled by Kazantzakis himself in one of his epistles.

From 1902 to 1906 Kazantzakis studied law at the University of Athens; his 1906 Juris Doctor thesis was titled Ο Φρειδερίκος Νίτσε εν τη φιλοσοφία του δικαίου και της πολιτείας ("Friedrich Nietzsche on the Philosophy of Right and the State"). At that point, also an initiated freemason, he went to the Sorbonne in 1907 to study philosophy and fell under the spell of Henri Bergson. In 1909 he graduated with a reworked doctoral dissertation: Friedrich Nietzsche dans la philosophie du droit et de la cité.

Upon his return to Greece, Kazantzakis began translating philosophical works. In 1914 he met the writer Angelos Sikelianos. Together they travelled for two years through places where Greek Orthodox Christian culture flourished, largely due to the enthusiastic nationalism of Sikelianos.

Nikos Kazantzakis married Galateia Alexiou in 1911. The two divorced in 1926, two years after Kazantzakis had met Eleni Samiou (Helen), whom he would later marry. Samiou helped Kazantzakis with his work, typing drafts, accompanying him on his travels, and managing his business affairs. They remained married until Nikos' death in 1957. Samiou died in 2004.

Between 1922 and his death in 1957, he sojourned in Paris and Berlin (from 1922 to 1924), Italy, Russia (in 1925), Spain (in 1932), and then later in Cyprus, Aegina, Egypt, Mount Sinai, Czechoslovakia, Nice (he later bought a villa in nearby Antibes, in the Old Town section near the famed seawall), China, and Japan.

While in Berlin, where the political situation was explosive, Kazantzakis discovered communism and became an admirer of Vladimir Lenin. He never became a committed communist but visited the Soviet Union and stayed with the Left Opposition politician and writer Victor Serge. He witnessed the rise of Joseph Stalin, and became disillusioned with Soviet-style communism. Around this time, his earlier nationalist beliefs were gradually replaced by a more universalist ideology. As a journalist, in 1926 he interviewed Prime Minister of Spain Miguel Primo de Rivera and the Italian dictator Benito Mussolini.

During the Second World War he was in Athens, where he and the philologist Ioannis Kakridis translated the Iliad. In 1945 Kazantzakis became the leader of a small party on the non-communist left, and entered the Greek government as Minister without Portfolio. He resigned this post the following year. In 1946 he became the head of the UNESCO Bureau of Translations, the organisation which promoted translations of literary works. However, he resigned in 1947 to concentrate on writing, and indeed produced most of his literary output during the last ten years of his life.

In 1946 the Society of Greek Writers recommended that Kazantzakis and Angelos Sikelianos should be awarded the Nobel Prize for Literature. In 1957 he lost the Prize to Albert Camus by a single vote. Camus later said that Kazantzakis deserved the honour "a hundred times more" than himself. In total, Kazantzakis was nominated in nine different years.

=== Death ===
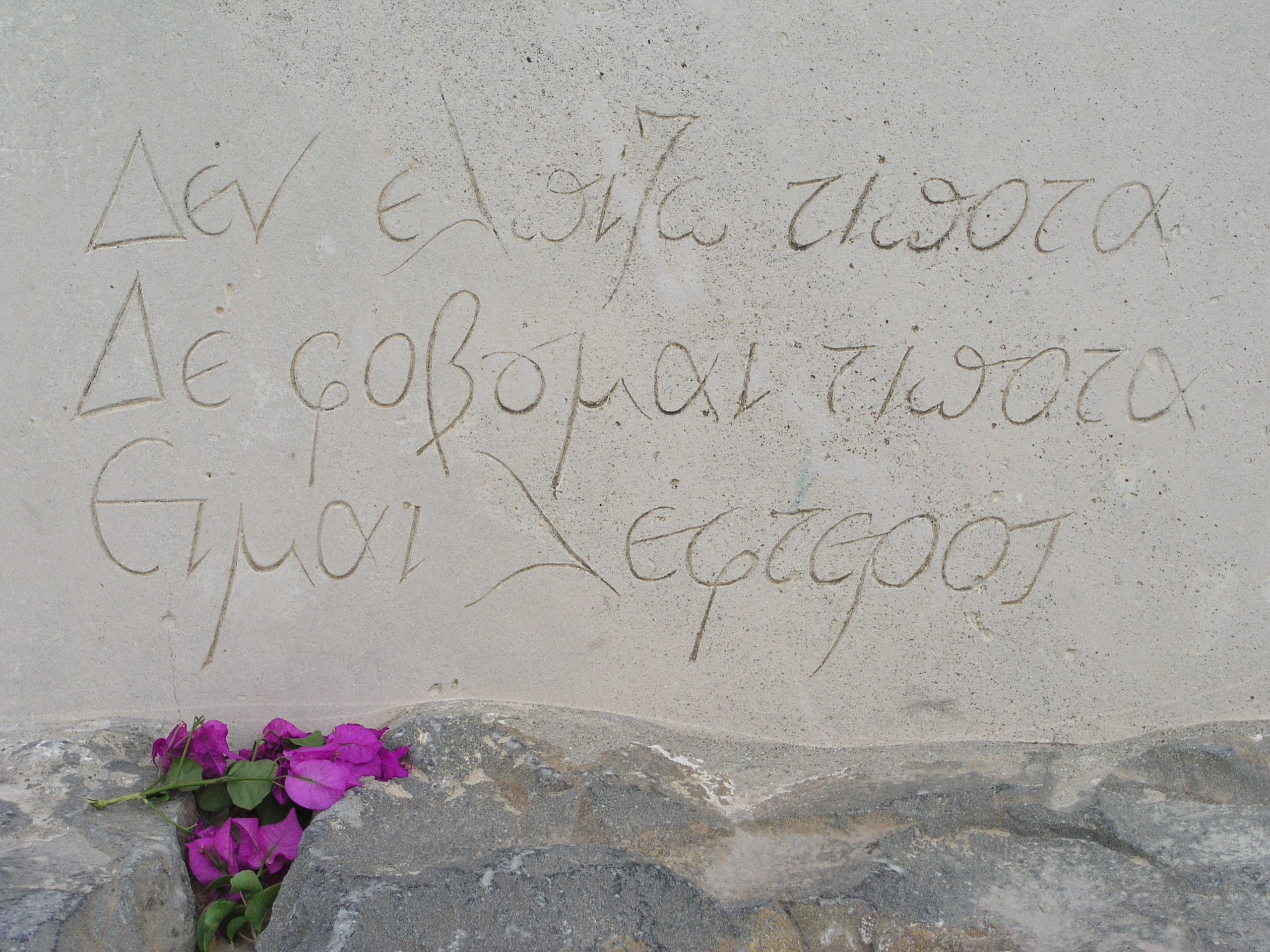
Epitaph on the grave of Kazantzakis in Heraklion. It reads "I hope for nothing. I fear nothing. I am free."

Late in 1957, even though suffering from leukaemia, Kazantzakis set out on one last trip to China and Japan. According to one theory, while in China he had to be vaccinated, possibly due to symptoms of smallpox and cholera. The vaccine, however, caused gangrene, and at the expense of the Chinese government he was transported first to Copenhagen and then to Freiburg im Breisgau in West Germany. His gangrene was cured, but he had contracted a severe form of Asian flu in China, which eventually led to his death.

Kazantzakis died on 26 October 1957, in Freiburg, at the age of 74. He is buried at the highest point of the Walls of Heraklion, the Martinengo Bastion, looking out over the mountains and sea of Crete. His epitaph reads "I hope for nothing. I fear nothing. I am free." (Δεν ελπίζω τίποτα. Δε φοβούμαι τίποτα. Είμαι λέφτερος.)

The 50th anniversary of his death was selected as the main motif for a high-value euro collectors' coin; the €10 Greek Nikos Kazantzakis commemorative coin, minted in 2007. His image is on the obverse of the coin, while the reverse carries the National Emblem of Greece, with his signature.

== Literary work ==
Kazantzakis's first published work was the 1906 narrative, Serpent and Lily (Όφις και Κρίνο), which he signed with the pen name 'Karma Nirvami' (Κάρμα Νιρβαμή). In 1907 he went to Paris for his graduate studies and was deeply influenced by the philosophy of Henri Bergson, primarily the idea that a true understanding of the world comes from the combination of intuition, personal experience, and rational thought. The theme of rationalism mixed with irrationality later became central to many of Kazantzakis's later stories, characters, and personal philosophies. Later, in 1909, he wrote a one-act play titled Comedy, which was filled with existential themes, predating the post-Second World War existentialist movement in Europe spearheaded by writers like Jean-Paul Sartre and Camus. After completing his studies in Paris, he wrote the tragedy, "The Master Builder" (Ο Πρωτομάστορας), based on a popular Greek folkloric myth.

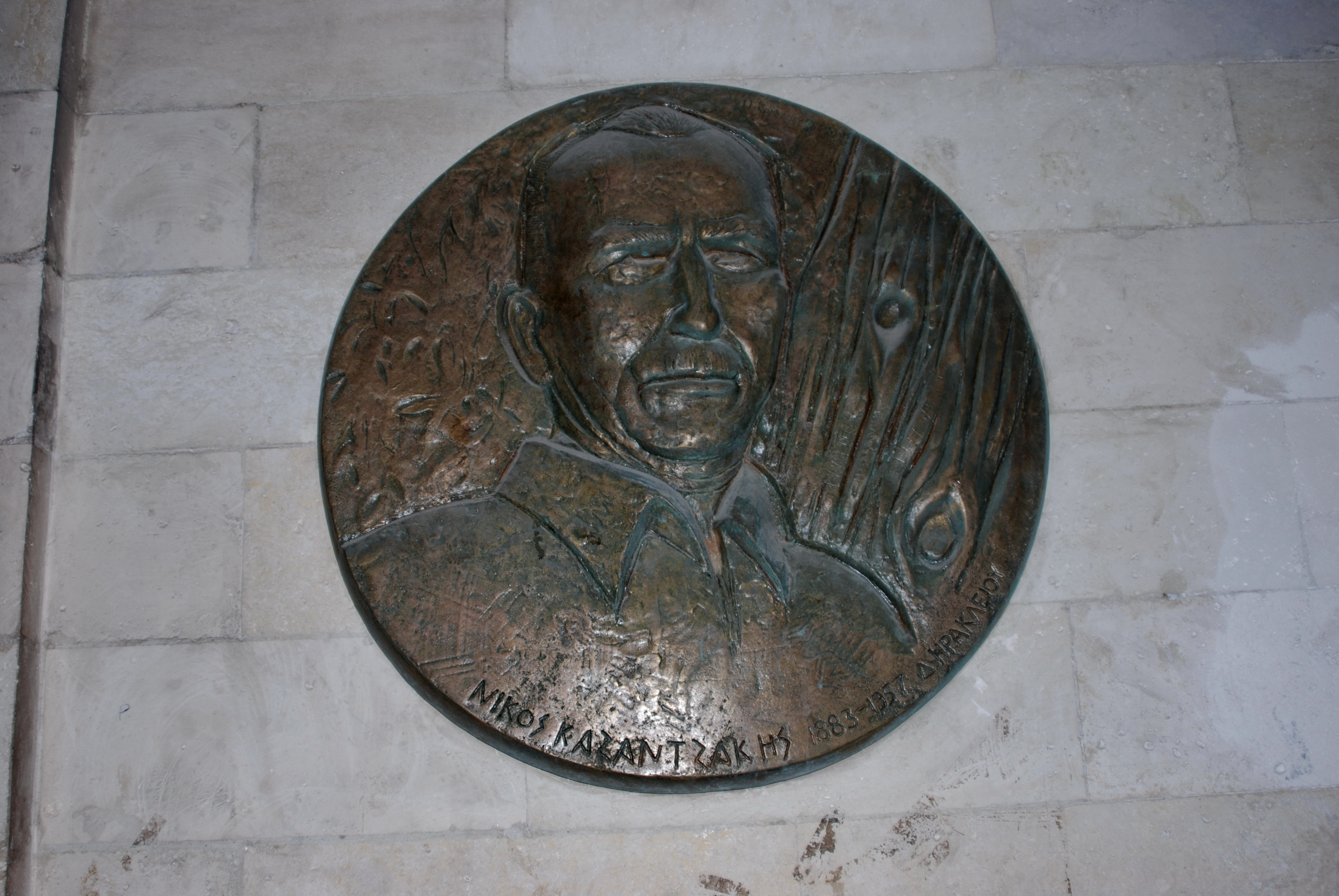
Medallion honoring Kazantzakis in the Venetian loggia of Heraklion

Through the next several decades, from the 1910s through the 1930s, Kazantzakis visited many countries, including Germany, Italy, France, the Netherlands, Romania, Egypt, Russia, Japan, and China, among others. Kazantzakis would often write about his influences in letters to friends, citing Sigmund Freud, the philosophy of Friedrich Nietzsche, Buddhist theology, and communist ideology as major influences. While he continued to travel later in life, the bulk of his travel writing came from this time period.

Kazantzakis began writing The Odyssey: A Modern Sequel in 1924, and completed it in 1938 after fourteen years of writing and revision. The poem follows the hero of Homer's Odyssey, Odysseus, as he undertakes a final journey after the end of the original poem. Following the structure of Homer's Odyssey, it is divided into 24 rhapsodies and consists of 33,333 lines. While Kazantzakis felt this poem held his cumulative wisdom and experience, and that it was his greatest literary experience, literary critics were split, "some praised it as an unprecedented epic, [while] many simply viewed it as a hybristic act," with many scholars still being split to this day. A common criticism of The Odyssey: A Modern Sequel was aimed at Kazantzakis's over-reliance on flowery and metaphorical verse, a criticism that is also aimed at his works of fiction.

Many of Kazantzakis's most famous novels were published between 1940 and 1961, including Zorba the Greek (1946), Christ Recrucified (1948), Captain Michalis (1953), The Last Temptation of Christ (1955), and Report to Greco (1961).

The scholar Peter Bien argues that each story presents different aspects of post-World War II Greek culture such as religion, nationalism, political beliefs, the Greek Civil War, gender roles, immigration, and general cultural practices and beliefs. These works also explore what Kazantzakis believed to be the unique physical and spiritual location of Greece, a nation that belongs to neither the East nor the West, an idea he put forth in many of his letters to friends. Bien writes: "Kazantzakis viewed Greece's special mission as the reconciliation of Eastern instinct with Western reason," thus echoing the Bergsonian themes found in many of his novels where logos is balanced against emotion.

Two of these works of fiction, Zorba the Greek and The Last Temptation of Christ, had major motion picture adaptations in 1964 and in 1988 respectively.

Nikos Kazantzakis commemorative coin

== Language and use of Demotic Greek ==
During the time when Kazantzakis was writing his novels, poems, and plays, the majority of "serious" Greek artistic work was written in Katharevousa, a "pure" form of the Greek language that was created to bridge Ancient Greek with Modern, Demotic Greek, in order to "purify" Demotic Greek. The use of Demotic, among writers, gradually started to gain the upper hand only at the turn of the 20th century, under the influence of the New Athenian School (or Palamian).

In his letters to friends and correspondents, Kazantzakis wrote that he chose to write in Demotic Greek to capture the spirit of the people and to make his writing resonate with the common Greek citizen. Moreover, he wanted to prove that the common spoken language of Greek was able to produce artistic, literary works. "Why not show off all the possibilities of Demotic Greek?" he argued. Furthermore, he felt that it was important to record the vernacular of the everyday person, including Greek peasants, and often tried to include expressions, metaphors, and idioms he would hear while traveling throughout Greece and incorporate them into his writing for posterity. At the time of writing, some scholars and critics condemned his work because it was not written in Katharevousa, while others praised it precisely because it was written in Demotic Greek.

Several critics have argued that Kazantzakis's writing was too flowery, filled with obscure metaphors, and difficult to read despite being written in Demotic Greek. The Kazantzakis scholar Peter Bien argues that the metaphors and language Kazantzakis used were taken directly from the peasants he encountered when travelling through Greece. Bien asserts that, since Kazantzakis was trying to preserve the language of the people, he used their local metaphors and phrases to give his narrative an air of authenticity and preserve these phrases so that they were not lost.

== Socialism ==
Throughout his life, Kazantzakis reiterated his belief that "only socialism as the goal and democracy as the means" could provide an equitable solution to the "frightfully urgent problems of the age in which we are living." He saw the need for socialist parties throughout the world to put aside their bickering and unite so that the programme of "socialist democracy" could prevail not just in Greece but throughout the civilised world. He described socialism as a social system that "does not permit the exploitation of one person by another" and that "must guarantee every freedom."

Kazantzakis was anathema to the right-wing in Greece both before and after the Second World War. The right waged war against his books and called him "immoral" and a "Bolshevik troublemaker" and accused him of being a "Russian agent". He was also distrusted by both the Communist Party of Greece and the Soviet Union as a "bourgeois" thinker. However, upon his death in 1957, he was honoured by the Chinese Communist Party as a "great writer" and "devotee of peace." Following the war, he was temporarily leader of a minor Greek leftist party, while in 1945 he was, among others, a founding member of the Greek-Soviet friendship union.

== Religious beliefs and relationship with the Greek Orthodox Church ==
While Kazantzakis was deeply spiritual, he often discussed his struggle with religious faith, specifically his Greek Orthodoxy. Baptised Greek Orthodox as a child, he was fascinated by the lives of saints from a young age. As a young man he took a month long trip to Mount Athos, a monastic retreat and major spiritual center for Greek Orthodoxy. Most critics and scholars of Kazantzakis agree that the struggle to find truth in religion and spirituality was central to many of his works, and that some novels, like The Last Temptation of Christ and Christ Recrucified focus completely on questioning Christian morals and values. As he traveled Europe, he was influenced by various philosophers, cultures, and religions, like Buddhism, causing him to question his Christian beliefs. While never claiming to be an atheist, his public questioning and critique put him at odds with some in the Greek Orthodox Church and many of his critics. Scholars theorise that Kazantzakis's difficult relationship with many members of the clergy and with more religiously conservative literary critics, came from his questioning. In his book Broken Hallelujah: Nikos Kazantzakis and Christian Theology, author Darren Middleton theorises that, "Where the majority of Christian writers focus on God's immutability, Jesus' deity, and our salvation through God's grace, Kazantzakis emphasized divine mutability, Jesus' humanity, and God's own redemption through our effort," highlighting Kazantzakis's uncommon interpretation of traditional Orthodox Christian beliefs.

Many Orthodox Church clergy condemned Kazantzakis's work and a campaign was started to excommunicate him. His reply was: "You gave me a curse, Holy fathers, I give you a blessing: may your conscience be as clear as mine and may you be as moral and religious as I" ("Μου δώσατε μια κατάρα, Άγιοι πατέρες, σας δίνω κι εγώ μια ευχή: Σας εύχομαι να 'ναι η συνείδηση σας τόσο καθαρή, όσο είναι η δική μου και να 'στε τόσο ηθικοί και θρήσκοι όσο είμαι εγώ"). While the excommunication was rejected by the top leadership of the Orthodox Church, it became emblematic of the persistent disapprobation from many Christian authorities for his political and religious views.

Modern scholarship tends to dismiss the idea that Kazantzakis was being sacrilegious or blasphemous with the content of his novels and beliefs. These scholars argue that, if anything, Kazantzakis was acting in accordance to a long tradition of Christians who publicly struggled with their faith, and grew a stronger and more personal connection to God through their doubt. Moreover, scholars like Darren J. N. Middleton argue that Kazantzakis's interpretation of the Christian faith predated the more modern, personalised interpretation of Christianity that has become popular in the years after Kazantzakis's death.

== Bibliography of English translations ==
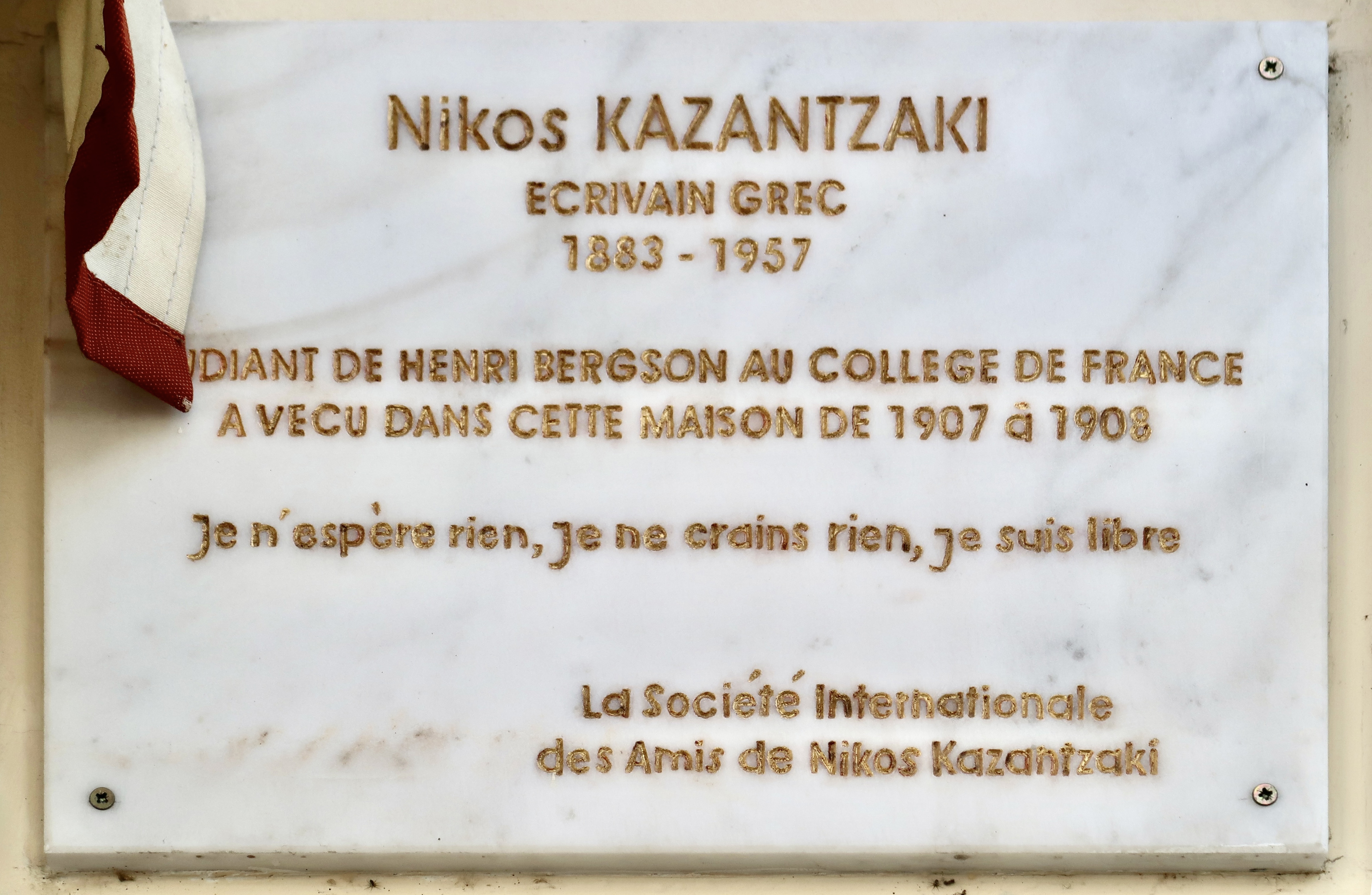
Plaque for Kazantzakis, 13 rue Du Sommerard, Paris

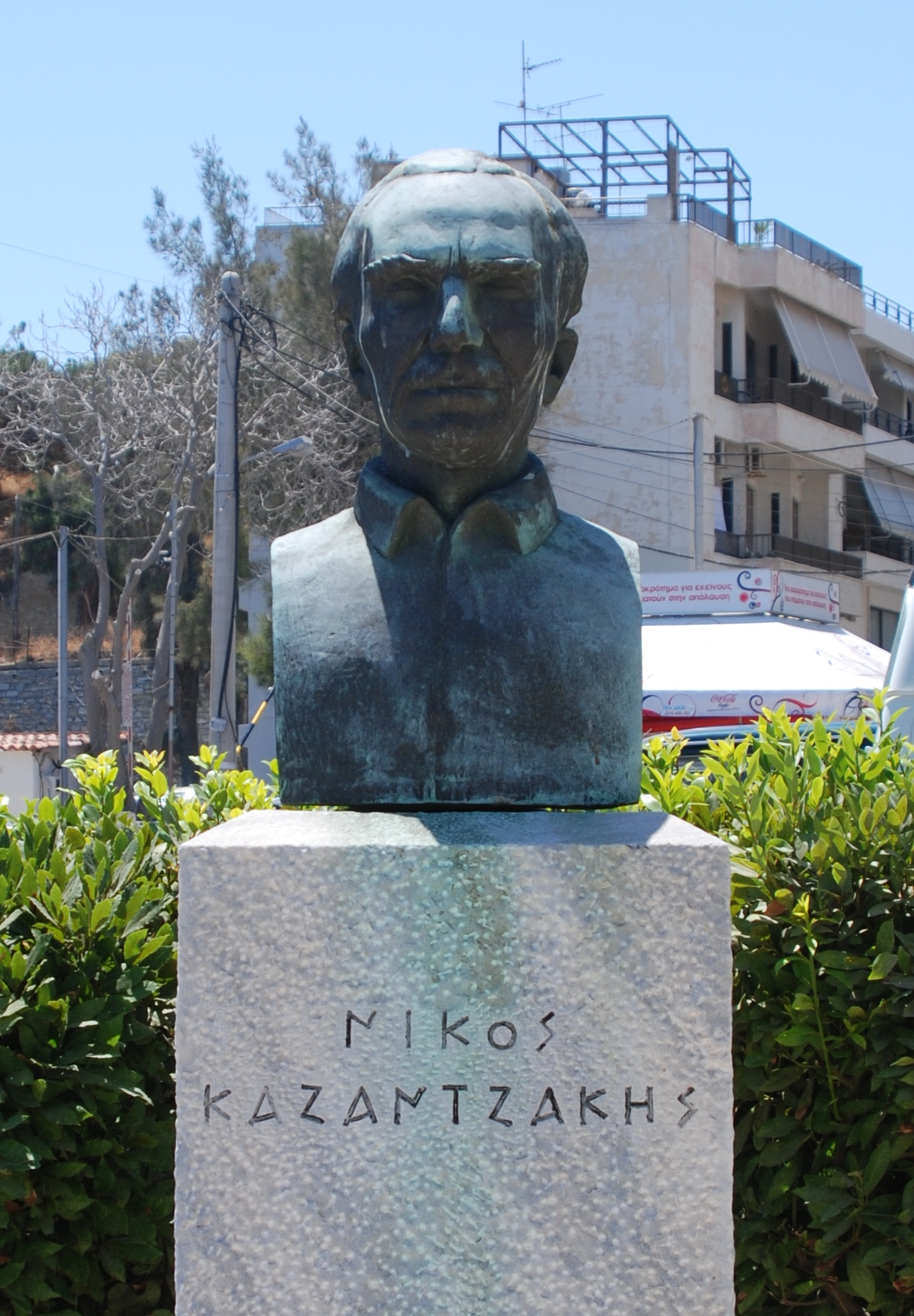
A bust in Heraklion

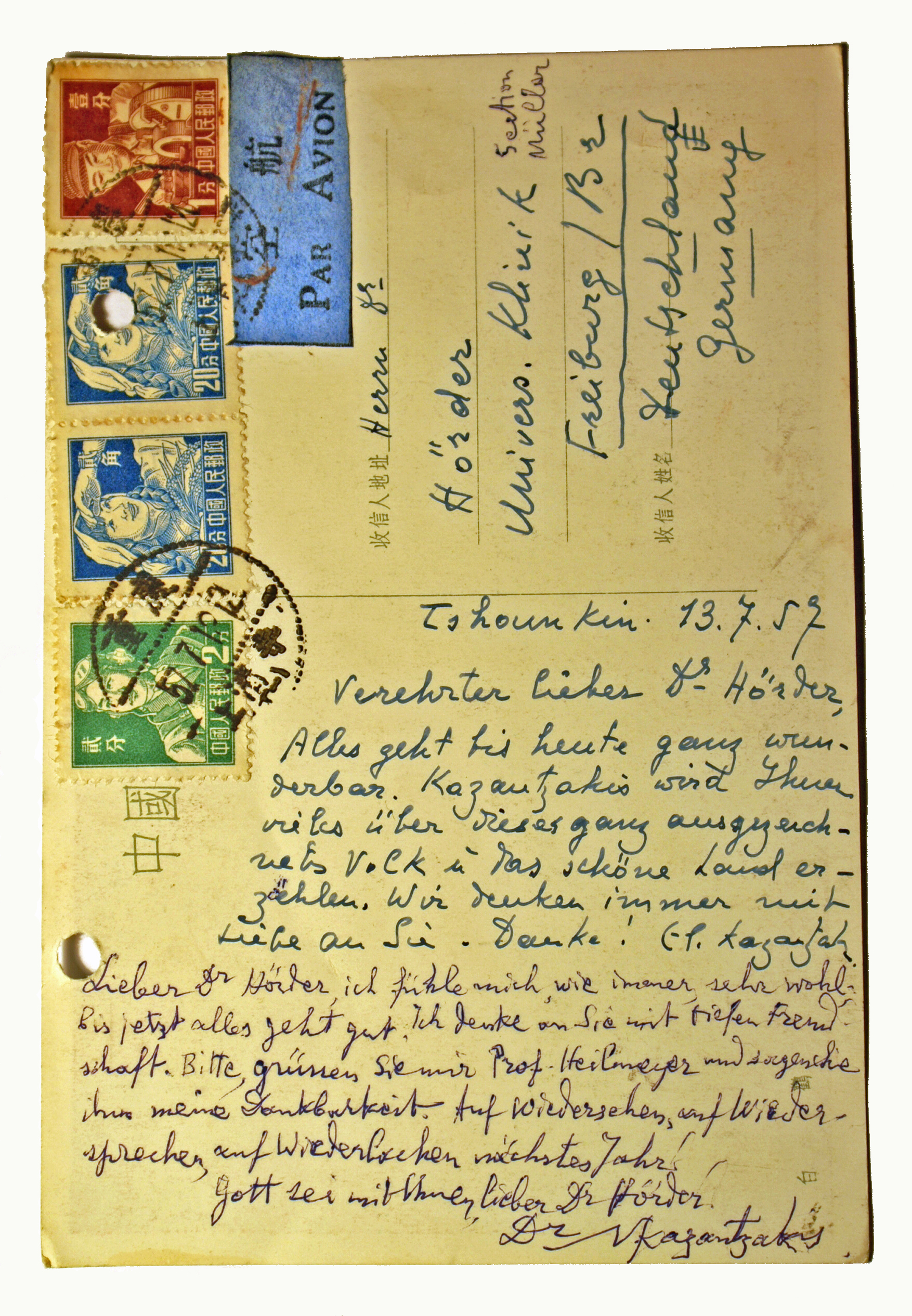
Postcard from Nikos Kazantzakis to his physician Max-Hermann Hörder, 13 September 1957, Chongqing

=== Translations of The Odyssey: A Modern Sequel, in whole or in part ===
- The Odyssey [Selections from], partial translation in prose by Kimon Friar, Wake 12 (1953), pp. 58–65.
- The Odyssey, excerpt translated by Kimon Friar, Chicago Review 8, No. 2 (Spring/Summer 1954), pp. 12–18.
- "The Return of Odysseus", partial translation by Kimon Friar, The Atlantic Monthly 195, No. 6 (June 1955), pp. 110–112.
- The Odyssey: A Modern Sequel, a full verse-translation by Kimon Friar, New York: Simon & Schuster, 1958; London: Secker and Warburg, 1958.
- "Death, the Ant", from The Odyssey: A Modern Sequel, Book XV, 829–63, trans. Kimon Friar, The Charioteer, No. 1 (Summer 1960), p. 39.

=== Travel books ===
- Spain, trans. Amy Mims, New York: Simon & Schuster, 1963.
- Japan, China, trans. George C. Pappageotes, New York: Simon & Schuster, 1963; published in the United Kingdom as Travels in China & Japan, Oxford: Bruno Cassirer, 1964; London: Faber and Faber, 1964.
- England, trans. Amy Mims, New York: Simon & Schuster, 1965; Oxford, Bruno Cassirer, 1965.
- Journey to the Morea, trans. by F. A. Reed, New York: Simon & Schuster, 1965; published in the United Kingdom as Travels in Greece: Journey to the Morea, Oxford, Bruno Cassirer, 1966.
- Journeying: Travels in Italy, Egypt, Sinai, Jerusalem and Cyprus, trans. Themi Vasils and Theodora Vasils, Boston and Toronto: Little, Brown and Company, 1975; San Francisco: Creative Arts Books Co., 1984.
- Russia, trans. A. Maskaleris and M. Antonakis, San Francisco: Creative Arts Books Co, 1989.

=== Novels ===
- Zorba the Greek, trans. Carl Wildman, London: John Lehmann, 1952; New York: Simon & Schuster, 1953; Oxford: Bruno Cassirer, 1959; London & Boston: Faber and Faber, 1961; New York: Ballantine Books, 1964; and Zorba the Greek: The Saint's Life of Alexis Zorba, newly translated by Peter Bien, New York: Simon & Schuster, 2014.
- The Greek Passion, trans. Jonathan Griffin, New York, Simon & Schuster, 1954; New York, Ballantine Books, 1965; published in the United Kingdom as Christ Recrucified, Oxford: Bruno Cassirer, 1954; London: Faber and Faber, 1954.
- Freedom or Death, trans. Jonathan Griffin, New York: Simon & Schuster, 1954; New York: Ballantine, 1965; and in the United Kingdom Oxford: Bruno Cassirer, 1956; London: Faber and Faber, 1956.
- The Last Temptation, trans. Peter A. Bien, New York, Simon & Schuster, 1960; New York: Bantam Books, 1961; Oxford: Bruno Cassirer, 1961; London: Faber and Faber, 1975.
- Saint Francis, trans. Peter A. Bien, New York: Simon & Schuster, 1962; published in the United Kingdom as God's Pauper: Saint Francis of Assisi, Oxford: Bruno Cassirer, 1962, 1975; London: Faber and Faber, 1975.
- The Rock Garden, trans. from French (in which it was originally written) by Richard Howard, New York: Simon & Schuster, 1963.
- The Fratricides, trans. Athena Gianakas Dallas, New York: Simon & Schuster, 1964; Oxford: Bruno Cassirer, 1964.
- Toda Raba, trans. from French (in which it was originally written) by Amy Mims, New York: Simon & Schuster, 1964.
- Report to Greco — see under Memoirs, essays and letters
- Alexander the Great: A Novel [for children], trans. Theodora Vasils, Athens (Ohio): Ohio University Press, 1982.
- At the Palaces of Knossos: A Novel [for children], trans. Themi and Theodora Vasilis, ed. Theodora Vasilis, London: Owen, 1988. Adapted from the draft typewritten manuscript.
- Father Yanaros [from the novel The Fratricides], trans. Theodore Sampson, in Modern Greek Short Stories, vol. 1, ed. Kyr. Delopoulos, Athens: Kathimerini Publications, 1980.
- Serpent and Lily, trans. Theodora Vasils, Berkeley: University of California Press, 1980.

==== Novels not translated into English but in other languages ====
- 1908: Broken Souls (Greek: Σπασμένες Ψυχές, Spasmenes Psyches), serialized in O Numas (1909–10). A Spanish translation was published as Almas rotas (2016).
- 1946: The Ascent (Greek: Ο Ανήφορος, O Aniforos), first published by Dioptra in 2022. Translations have appeared in French, Romanian, Bulgarian, and Turkish.

=== Short stories ===
- "He Wants to Be Free – Kill Him!" trans. Athena G. Dallas, Greek Heritage 1, No. 1 (Winter 1963), pp. 78–82.

=== Plays ===
- Julian the Apostate: First staged in Paris, 1948.
- Three Plays: Melissa, Kouros, Christopher Columbus, trans. Athena Gianakas-Dallas, New York: Simon & Schuster, 1969.
- Christopher Columbus, trans. Athena Gianakas-Dallas, Kentfield (CA): Allen Press, 1972. Edition limited to 140 copies.
- From Odysseus: A Drama, partial translation by M. Byron Raizis, The Literary Review 16, No. 3 (Spring 1973), p. 352.
- Comedy: A Tragedy in One Act, trans. Kimon Friar, The Literary Review 18, No. 4 (Summer 1975), pp. 417–454 {61}.
- Sodom and Gomorrah, A Play, trans. Kimon Friar, The Literary Review 19, No. 2 (Winter 1976), pp. 122–256 (62).
- Two plays: Sodom and Gomorrah and Comedy: A Tragedy in One Act, trans. Kimon Friar, Minneapolis: North Central Publishing Co., 1982.
- Buddha, trans. Kimon Friar and Athena Dallas-Damis, San Diego: Avant Books, 1983.
- Odysseus: A Verse Tragedy, trans. Kostas Myrsiades, Boston: Somerset Hall Press, 2022.

=== Poems ===
- 1932–1937: "Tertsines", first ed., 1960 - ISBN 978-960-794-819-9 (untranslated)
- Christ (poetry), trans. Kimon Friar, Journal of Hellenic Diaspora (JHD) 10, No. 4 (Winter 1983), pp. 47–51 (60).

=== Memoirs, essays and letters ===
- The Saviours of God: Spiritual Exercises, trans. Kimon Friar, New York: Simon & Schuster, 1960.
- Report to Greco, trans. Peter A. Bien, New York: Simon & Schuster, 1965; Oxford: Bruno Cassirer, 1965; London: Faber and Faber, 1965; New York: Bantam Books, 1971.
- Symposium, trans. Theodora Vasils and Themi Vasils, New York: Thomas Y. Crowell Company, 1974; New York: Minerva Press, 1974.
- Friedrich Nietzsche on the Philosophy of Right and the State, trans. O. Makridis, New York: State University of NY Press, 2007.
- From The Saviours of God: Spiritual Exercises, trans. Kimon Friar, The Charioteer, No. 1 (Summer 1960), pp. 40–51; reprinted in The Charioteer 22 and 23 (1980/1981), pp. 116–129 {57}.
- The Suffering God: Selected Letters to Galatea and to Papastephanou, trans. Philip Ramp and Katerina Anghelaki Rooke, New Rochelle (NY): Caratzas Brothers, 1979.
- The Angels of Cyprus, trans. Amy Mims, in Cyprus '74: Aphrodite's Other Face, ed. Emmanuel C. Casdaglis, Athens: National Bank of Greece, 1976.
- Burn Me to Ashes: An Excerpt, trans. Kimon Friar, Greek Heritage 1, No. 2 (Spring 1964), pp. 61–64.
- Drama and Contemporary Man: An Essay, trans. Peter Bien, The Literary Review 19, No. 2 (Winter 1976), pp. 15–121 {62}.
- The Homeric G.B.S., "The Shaw Review" 18, No. 3 (Sept. 1975), pp. 91–92. Greek original written for a 1946 Greek-language radio broadcast by BBC Overseas Service, on the occasion of George Bernard Shaw's 90th birthday.
- Hymn (Allegorical), trans. M. Byron Raizis, Spirit 37, No. 3 (Fall 1970), pp. 16–17.
- Two Dreams, trans. Peter Mackridge, Omphalos 1, No. 2 (Summer 1972), p. 3.
- Peter Bien (ed. and tr.), The Selected Letters of Nikos Kazantzakis, Princeton Modern Greek Studies, Princeton: Princeton University Press, 2012.

=== Anthologies ===
- A Tiny Anthology of Kazantzakis: Remarks on the Drama, 1910–1957, compiled by Peter Bien, The Literary Review 18, No. 4 (Summer 1975), pp. 455–459 {61}.

== Film, television and documentary adaptations ==
Several of Nikos Kazantzakis' novels have been adapted for cinema and television.

=== Feature films ===
- He Who Must Die (French: Celui qui doit mourir, 1957), directed by Jules Dassin, based on the novel Christ Recrucified (Ο Χριστός Ξανασταυρώνεται).
- Zorba the Greek (1964), directed by Michael Cacoyannis, based on the novel Zorba the Greek.
- The Last Temptation of Christ (1988), directed by Martin Scorsese, based on Kazantzakis' novel The Last Temptation of Christ.
- Kazantzakis (2017), directed by Yannis Smaragdis, a biographical film based primarily on Eleni Kazantzakis' memoir Report to Greco.

=== Television ===
- Christ Recrucified (BBC, 1969), a six-part television miniseries directed by Hugh David and adapted by Jack Pulman from the novel Christ Recrucified.
- O Christos Xanastavronetai (Greek: Ο Χριστός Ξανασταυρώνεται, ERT, 1975–1976), directed by Vasilis Georgiadis, based on the novel of the same name.
