= The Last Temptation of Christ (novel) =

1955 historical novel by Nikos Kazantzakis

- First Greek edition (1955)
- Author: Nikos Kazantzakis
- Original title: O Teleftéos Pirasmós
- Translator: Peter A. Bien (US)
- Language: Greek
- Genre: Historical fiction
- Publisher: Simon & Schuster (USA) & Bruno Cassirer (UK)
- Publication date: 1955
- Publication place: Greece
- Media type: Print (Hardback & paperback)
- Pages: 506 (first edition, hardback)
- ISBN: 0-684-85256-X
- OCLC: 38925790

The Last Temptation of Christ or The Last Temptation (Greek: Ο Τελευταίος Πειρασμός, O Teleftéos Pirasmós) is a historical novel written by Nikos Kazantzakis, first published in its original Greek in 1955 before being translated into English in 1960. The novel depicts the life of Jesus and his struggles with various forms of temptation, including fear, doubt, depression, reluctance, pride, and lust.

Upon its publication, the book was condemned by the Catholic Church and the Greek Orthodox Church; it has since been challenged by numerous Christian groups and conservative organizations. The 1988 film adaptation directed by Martin Scorsese was similarly controversial.

== Plot ==
The novel opens with Jesus as a lost and friendless young man in the desert, wrestling with his divine calling and the knowledge of his imminent death. Throughout the book, Jesus grapples with his human desires and the temptation to lead a normal life, away from the suffering and sacrifice that he knows awaits him. Despite his reservations, Jesus decides to follow through with his mission, ultimately leading to his arrest, trial, and crucifixion.

However, the climax of the novel takes a different turn as Jesus is shown dying on the cross, only to awaken in a vision of a world where he did not die and instead lived a long, normal life with Mary Magdalene as his wife after choosing to abandon his calling. In this world, Jesus experiences love, pain, and suffering just as any other human being would.

As he lives out his life in this alternate world, Jesus begins to question whether or not his divine mission was worth all of the suffering that he went through. Eventually, he realizes that though he would have been content with living as a normal man, his death is rendered meaningless, and his teachings forgotten. Accepting that his destiny is to sacrifice himself for the sake of humanity, Jesus willingly returns to his fate as the son of God.

The novel concludes with Jesus ascending to heaven, leaving behind a legacy of love, sacrifice, and redemption.

== Themes ==
Kazantzakis argues in the novel's preface that by facing and conquering all of man's weaknesses, Jesus struggled to do God's will without ever giving in to the temptations of the flesh. The novel advances the argument that, had Jesus succumbed to any such temptation, especially the opportunity to save himself from the cross, his life would have held no more significance than that of any other philosopher.

The critic I. A. Richards has stated that Kazantzakis' novel tries to reclaim the values of early Christianity, such as love, brotherhood, humility, and self-renunciation. According to the book's English translator, Peter A. Bien, the psychology in The Last Temptation is based on the idea that every person, Jesus included, is evil by nature as well as good, violent and hateful as well as loving. A psychologically sound individual does not ignore or bury the evil within him. Instead, he channels it into the service of good.

Martin Scorsese, director of the 1988 film adaptation, formulated that Kazantzakis didn't doubt the divine nature of Jesus, noting, "The beauty of Kazantzakis' concept is that Jesus has to put up with everything we go through, all the doubts and fears and anger. He made me feel like he's sinning—but he's not sinning, he’s just human. As well as divine. And he has to deal with all this double, triple guilt on the cross."

== Controversy ==
In February 1955, the Holy Synod of the Greek Orthodox Church in Athens attempted to have all of Kazantzakis' books banned in Greece, arguing that The Last Temptation of Christ "contains evil slanders against the Godlike person of Jesus Christ. … derived from the inspiration of the theories of Freud and historical materialism, [this book] perverts and hurts the Gospel discernment and the God-man figure of our Lord Jesus Christ in a way coarse, vulgar, and blasphemous." A campaign was also started in the Greek Orthodox Church to excommunicate Kazantzakis, which ultimately failed, but he was denied normal funeral rites upon his death.

In 1963, a Roman Catholic priest in Ashland, Wisconsin, forbade one of his parishioners from returning a library copy of The Last Temptation of Christ, arguing "that it would be a mortal sin to make it available to others." In 1964, a conservative group called the Citizens Group for Clean Books demanded that the novel be removed from public libraries in Arcadia, California, on the basis that it was "blasphemous, obscene and defamatory"; as a result, the book was made "available on a limited basis to persons over the age of 18."

The book was banned in Singapore in 1988.

== Adaptations ==
=== Film version ===
The director Sidney Lumet acquired the film rights to Kazantzakis' novel, describing it as the story "of how a man pushes himself to extremes he never knew he was capable of," with Judas emerging "as a strong man, a sort of hero". Lumet commissioned a screenplay written by Lazarre Seymour Simckes and announced his plans to shoot the film in the fall of 1971, though the project did not come to fruition. After many delays, a film version directed by Martin Scorsese was released in 1988, starring Willem Dafoe as Jesus, Barbara Hershey as Mary Magdalene, and Harvey Keitel as Judas Iscariot. The screenplay was by Paul Schrader with uncredited co-writes by Scorsese and Jay Cocks.

=== Play version ===
A drama based on The Last Temptation of Christ, named Christuvinte Aaram Thirumurivu ('The Sixth Holy Wound of Christ'), written by P. M. Antony and depicting Jesus as a mere good-hearted man instead of the Son of God, was staged in India's state of Kerala. On 10 August 1986, the play debuted in Alappuzha. It was performed about 42 times, but the Church had taken offence, and at every performance, demonstrations including premeditated violence against the play and the playwright were instigated. The police even confiscated the script; the state went on to ban the play, and courts did not overturn the ban. Antony went on to publish the play in print in the Malayalam language; eventually he was arrested and punished on unrelated charges.

== In popular culture ==
The American singer-songwriter Judee Sill referred to Kazantzakis as her favorite writer; her 1971 song "Jesus Was a Cross Maker" was inspired by the depiction of Jesus in The Last Temptation of Christ.

In a 1988 private concert filmed at a Holiday Inn in Houston, American country singer-songwriter Townes Van Zandt cited The Last Temptation of Christ as the inspiration behind his 1970 song "Nothin"; Van Zandt claimed to have written the lyrics the same night he finished reading the book, acknowledging "the big controversy goin' on" surrounding Kazantzakis' work at the time.
