= Christ Recrucified =

Novel by Nikos Kazantzakis

- First English edition (publ. Bruno Cassirer)
- Author: Nikos Kazantzakis
- Language: Greek
- Publication date: 1953
- Pages: 470
- ISBN: 9780851810102
- OCLC: 989728

Christ Is Recrucified (Ο Χριστός Ξανασταυρώνεται) is a 1948 novel by Nikos Kazantzakis, published in translation in the United States in 1953 as The Greek Passion and in the United Kingdom in the 1950s as Christ Recrucified (pictured).

== Plot summary ==
The story concerns the attempts of a fictional Greek village community deep in Anatolia in 1921 to stage a Passion Play, re-enacting the events of Jesus Christ's trial, suffering and death by crucifixion. The name of the village is Lycovrisi (Wolf-spring), under Ottoman rule.

The village holds Passion Plays every seven years and the elders of the village choose the actors from among the villagers. Manolios, who is chosen to play the role of Christ, is a humble shepherd boy who was once a novice in a monastery. Yannakkos becomes Apostle Peter. He is a merchant-peddler who travels with his donkey through the villages and sells his items. He is warm-hearted, naïve and loves his donkey above all else. Michelis, the son of the wealthy nobleman old Patriarcheas, becomes Apostle John. Kostandis, the owner of the village café, is Apostle James the Great. He is good-hearted, willing to share, but confused. Then comes Panayotaros, who is chosen to be Judas. He is a wild, passionate man, waiting for revenge. The widow Katerina is Mary Magdalene. She is the village's prostitute. She is beautiful, but of course an outsider in the village, not caring about anybody's opinion. But she is the most generous one and in the end gives her life for what she believes in.

Then the Elders of Lycovrissi are introduced. There is the Priest Grigoris — a domineering man who bends God's will to his own. Archon Patriarcheas is the leader of the village. He only lives for his own pleasure. Old Ladas is a miser who is obsessed with his money but lives in poverty so that he doesn't have to spend any of it. Hadji Nikolis is the schoolmaster, who means well but is ineffectual, haunted by fear of his brother the priest.

The whole story is made colorful by the Turkish household consisting of the Agha, the Lord of Lycovrissi. He lives surrounded by oriental splendor, drinks himself crazy and enjoys rakı and pretty boys. He is guarded by Hussein, a giant Oriental who does everything his master asks of him.

Another character is the Priest Fotis. He comes to the village with a whole group of starved villagers from a devastated village which has been overrun by the Turks, and they are looking for shelter in Lycovrissi. Denied this by the priest Grigoris, the refugees retire to the barren slopes of the nearby mountain Sarakina, where they continue to starve.

The villagers, simple, earnest people who are fond of Manolios (who is to play Christ) Yannakos (Apostle Peter), Michelis (Apostle John) etc. are indoctrinated by the elders. The main factor is a real saintly priest, Father Fotis who comes to the village to ask for help with hundreds of hungry and dying people and who is turned away from the village and finds a refuge on the barren mountain. There he tries to survive with the help of Manolios, Yannakos, Michelis and Konstandis. Father Grigoris is afraid to lose his power over the villagers and starts a hate campaign first against the priest and his people and then against the rest of the group. At one point Manolios offers his life to save the village, but in the last minute he is saved. The venom of the village elders appalls even the Agha, but he is too comfortable and too afraid to lose his power to do anything.

Manolios loses his shepherding job and lives up on the hill praying to God and following His voice. Michelis gives up his riches and comes to live with Manolios. This of course infuriates and in the end kills his father. One main character, Panayotaros (Apostle Judas), doesn’t really change in character, but he becomes very dangerous and a real Judas. He doesn’t care for his life anymore after widow Katerina dies, for whom he has a crazy desire. He is the one who spies on the people up on the mountain and on Michelis and Manolios and reports to Father Grigoris, one of the main villains.

In the end, Father Grigoris assembles the villagers in the church, where he instructs Panayotaros to stab Manolios to death in front of the mob of baying villagers:

“For an instant Manolios’s heart failed him, he turned to the door - it was closed; he looked at the three lit lamps and, under them, the icons loaded with ex-votos: Christ, red-cheeked, with carefully combed hair, was smiling; the Virgin Mary, bending over the child was taking no interest in what was happening under her eyes. Saint John the Baptist was preaching in the desert. He raised his eyes toward the vault of the church and made out in the half-light the face of the Almighty, bending pitilessly over mankind. He looked at the crowd about him; it was as if in the darkness he saw the gleam of daggers. The strident voice of old Ladas squeaked once more: “Let’s kill him!” At the same moment, violent blows were struck upon the door; all fell silent and turned toward the entrance; furious voices could be heard distinctly: “Open! Open!” “That’s the voice of father Fotis!” someone cried. “Yannakos’s voice,” said another; “the Sarakini have come to take him from us!” The door was shaken violently, its hinges creaked; there could be heard a great tumult of men and women outside. “Open, murderers! Have you no fear of God?” came the voice of father Fotis, distinctly. Priest Grigoris raised his hands. “In the name of Christ,” he cried, “ I take the sin upon me! Do it, Panayotaros.” Panayotaros drew the dagger and turned to father Grigoris. “With your blessing, Father!” he asked. “With my blessing, strike!”

Priest Fotis and his people bring the dead body of Manolios to the mountain. He kneels next to him and holds his hands.

“Toward midnight the bell began ringing, calling the Christians to the church to see Christ born. One by one the doors opened and the Christians hastened toward the church, shivering with cold. The night was calm, icy, starless.”

“Priest Fotis listened to the bell pealing gaily, announcing that Christ was coming down on earth to save the world. He shook his head and heaved a sigh: In vain, my Christ, in vain, he muttered; two thousand years have gone by and men crucify You still. When will You be born, my Christ, and not be crucified any more, but live among us for eternity.”

== Adaptations ==
Bohuslav Martinů wrote an opera in four acts called The Greek Passion (Czech Řecké pašije) based on the novel, with a libretto by the composer.

Jules Dassin's film He Who Must Die (Celui qui doit mourir, 1957) is based on the novel.

Derek Carver based his stage and BBC radio play Not to Send Peace on the novel.

A six-part dramatisation of the novel by Jack Pulman was broadcast on BBC-2 in August and September 1969.

Hellenic Broadcasting Corporation produced a TV series adaptation of the novel that was directed by Vasilis Georgiadis and aired from 1975 to 1976.
