= Kimon Friar =

Greek-American poet and translator

Kimon Friar (April 8, 1911 – May 25, 1993) was a Greek-American poet and translator of Greek poetry.

== Youth and education ==
Friar was born in 1911 in İmralı, Ottoman Empire (now modern day Turkey), to a Greek father and a Greek mother. In 1915, the family moved to the United States and Friar became an American citizen in 1920. As a child, Friar had problems with the English language, and so he spent his time on artistic efforts. At a young age, despite his trouble with English, Friar discovered poetry and later he became interested in drama. After reading Ode on a Grecian Urn by John Keats, Friar became fascinated with the energy of the English language and he determined to master it.

Friar was educated at a number of institutions, including the Chicago Art Institute, the Yale School of Drama, the University of Iowa, and University of Wisconsin–Madison where he received his bachelor's degree with honors in 1935. He went on to University of Michigan for his master's degree in 1940, and he won the Avery Hopwood Major Award for Yeats: A Vision.

== Poetry and teaching ==
Although he was dedicated to writing and translating poetry, Friar began teaching to support himself soon after leaving the University of Michigan. He taught English at Adelphi from 1940–1945, at Amherst College from 1945–1946, at New York University from 1952–1953, and at University of Minnesota Duluth from 1953–1954.

During these years, Friar organized poetry readings for the pleasure of the public. He was the director of the Poetry Center in the YW/YMHA in New York City from 1943–1946 where he encouraged famous poets and amateurs to read their poetry at receptions. From 1951–1952, Friar ran the Theatre Circle at the Circle in the Square Theatre, also in New York City. The plays produced there were primarily from the works of Arthur Miller, Tennessee Williams, Lillian Hellman, and Archibald MacLeish.

During his time at Amherst, Friar became the teacher and first lover of American poet James Merrill. According to Merrill scholar Langdon Hammer, Friar's "influence would go on unfolding for the rest of Merrill's poetic career."

== Death and honors ==
In 1978, Friar received the Greek World Award. Then, in 1986, he won both a Ford Foundation grant and a National Foundation of the Arts and Humanities grant. He is quoted as saying: "I like to say that the poet in a translation should be heard, but the translator should be overheard."

He spent his last years in Greece and died on May 25, 1993.

== Bibliography ==
- Yeats: A Vision (1940)
- Modern Poetry: American and British (with John Malcolm Brinnin) (1951)
- The Odyssey: A Modern Sequel, translation in verses by Kimon Friar, New York: Simon and Schuster, 1958; London: Secker and Warburg, 1958.
- Saviors of God (1960)
- Sodom and Gomorrah by Nikos Kazantzakis (translation by Kimon Friar) (1963)
- Modern European Poetry, Bantam Classics, 1966, editor and translator of the Greek section
- With Face to the Wall Selected Poems by Miltos Sahtouris, translations by Kimon Friar, Washington: The Charioteer Press, 1968.
- Modern Greek Poetry: from Cavafis to Elytis (1973)
- The Sovereign Sun: Selected poems by Odysseus Elytis, Trans. Kimon Friar (Philadelphia, United States 1974)

== Literary Awards ==
- Avery Hopwood Major Award
- Ford Foundation Grant
- National Foundation of the Arts Grant
