= Carl Bohnen =

American artist (1871–1951)

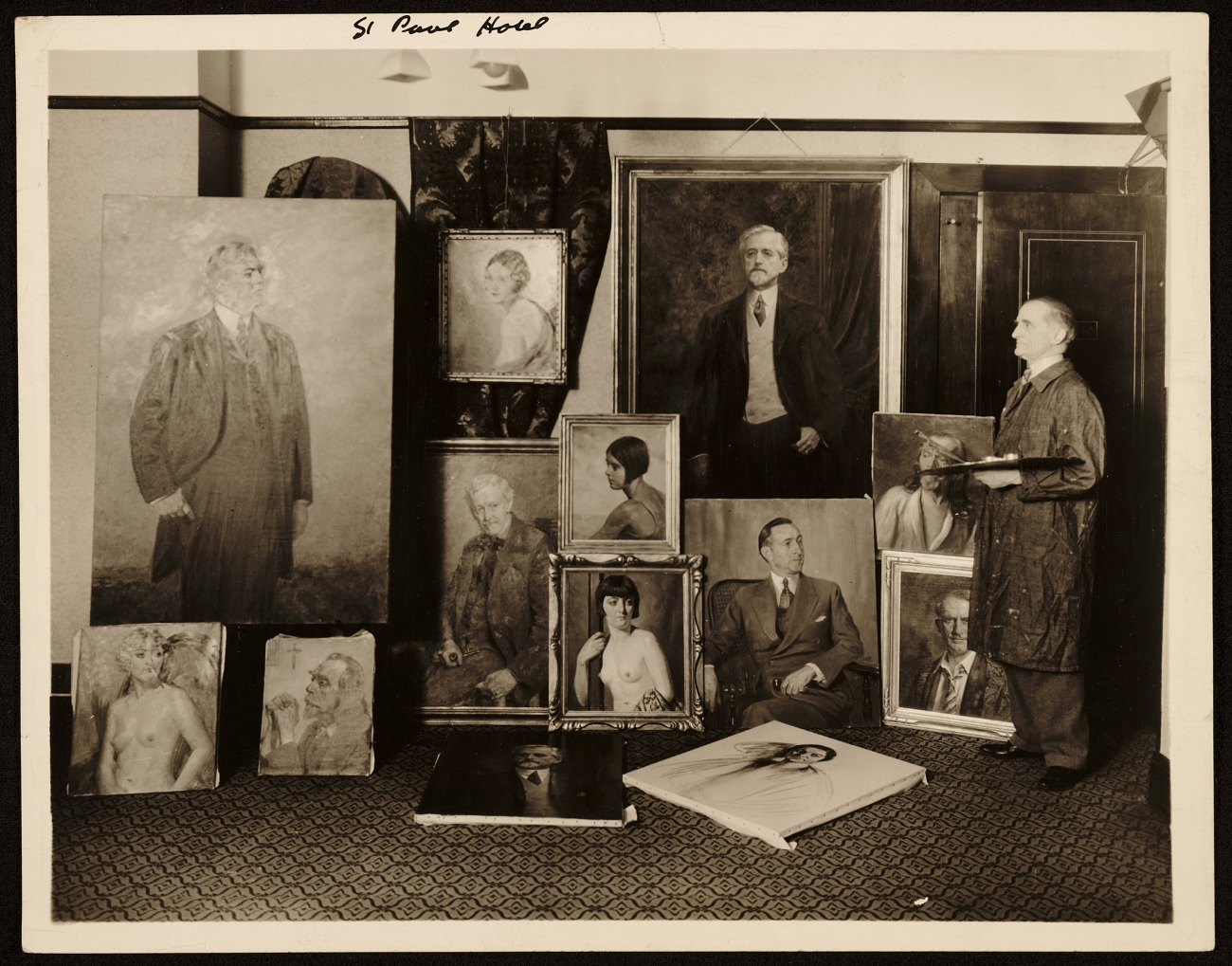
- Bohnen in a hotel studio c. 1922
- Born: Charles A. Bohnen; November 3, 1871; Erie, Pennsylvania, U.S.
- Died: December 31, 1951 (aged 80); Willmette, Illinois, U.S.
- Education: Saint John's University; St. Paul School of Fine Arts; Munich Academy of Fine Arts
- Known for: Portraits of famous Minnesotans
- Spouse: Charlotte "Lottie" M. Johnson
- Children: 3, including Roman Bohnen

Charles "Carl" A. Bohnen (November 3, 1871 – December 31, 1951; sometimes spelled Karl Bohnen) was an American artist from Saint Paul, Minnesota. Bohnen became famous for his depictions of various Minnesota politicians, Native Americans, and historical figures. Much of his work is exhibited at the Minnesota State Capitol or held by the Minnesota Historical Society.

== Early life ==
Charles A. Bohnen was born on November 3, 1871 in Erie, Pennsylvania to German American parents Nicholas Bohnen and Marie Jochin Bohnen. In 1872 Bohnen's family moved to Meire Grove, Minnesota, then a German-speaking community in Stearns County, Minnesota.

== Education ==
Bohnen attended college at St. John's University in Collegeville, Minnesota and graduated in 1892 with a Bachelors degree in bookkeeping and penmanship. Following college he began a career as a pen, ink, and crayon artist for the St. Paul Pioneer Press and the Dispatch newspaper out of Saint Paul. Bohnen's artwork quickly attracted the attention of the Twin Cities elite, which resulted in several commissioned pieces of artwork by people such as Richard A. Jackson, vice-president of the Great Northern Railway. Jackson proposed that if others backed Bohnen he could send him to travel to Europe for a two-year scholarship to Italy, Germany, Paris, and England. Bohnen's travel scholarship was made possible by Jackson, Louis W. Hill, Friedrich Weyerhäuser, Pierce Butler, and Frank B. Kellogg.

=== Scholarship to Europe ===
In 1914 Bohnen traveled to the German Empire to study art in Munich. Bohnen briefly studied in Italy under Saint Paul sculptor, artist, and neighbor Paul Manship before moving with his family to study in Munich. The Bohnen and Manship families already knew each other as they were neighbors while living near Bald Eagle Lake. Bohnen moved to Munich in April 1914. Several months later World War I began, making travel impossible. For the next several years Bohnen lived and worked in Germany. While in Germany Bohnen enrolled into the Academy of Fine Arts, Munich and briefly apprenticed to both Carl von Marr and Angelo Jank. He continued to create small pieces of artwork in order to stay employed. In Munich Bohnen was a member of the American Artist Club with Ernest Martin Hennings and Louis Grell. Bohnen did not return to Saint Paul until August 28, 1918, just three months before the Armistice of 11 November 1918.

== Career ==
Bohnen's return to the Minnesota was met with prejudice. As an American with German parents Bohnen and his family were treated with skepticism due to wartime anti-German sentiment and Bohnen's positive views of German people while traveling abroad. In the meantime, the Minnesota Legislature had created the Minnesota Commission of Public Safety (MCPS), under Minnesota Governor Joseph A. A. Burnquist. The MCPS quickly became an overreaching watchdog group in Minnesota which silenced all opposition to the war, monitored rationing and war effort, and spied on citizens in order to ensure compliance and loyalty to the United States. Bohnen was later investigated by the United States Department of Justice for questionable loyalty; however, he was found innocent and the charges were dropped. Following the investigation Bohnen left Saint Paul for Chicago where he lived for much of his life. Bohnen would eventually return to Minnesota as he was commissioned by many Minnesotans for artworks, primarily portraits. Bohnen eventually established a studio in Paris which he attended occasionally; however, most of his works were completed at his hotel studio at the Ryan Hotel in Saint Paul.

In 1919 Bohnen was approached by Minnesota Governor Burnquist in order to commission his official gubernatorial portrait. Burnquist was not the only Minnesota politician to commissioned Bohnen for such a portrait. Others include Joseph A. A. Burnquist, J. A. O. Preus, Theodore Christianson, Floyd B. Olson, Hjalmar Petersen, Elmer A. Benson, and Harold Stassen.

Other notable patrons of Bohnen include Frank B. Kellogg, Constance Collier, John Erskine, Edna Ferber, Charles Lindbergh, William Hamm Sr. (the son of Theodore Hamm), Edward VIII, Ethel Barrymore, Enrico Caruso, Helen Hayes, Douglas MacArthur, and George Mundelein. Bohnen continued to work as an artist into the late 1940s as he was commissioned to create a portrait of President of the United States Harry S. Truman. Bohnen later moved to Los Angeles to live with his son, actor Roman Bohnen. He died on December 31, 1951 in Wilmette, Illinois.

== Personal life ==
Bohnen was married in 1893 to Charlotte "Lottie" M. Johnson. Together they had three children. One was actor Roman Bohnen, known for the films Of Mice and Men (1939), The Song of Bernadette (1943), and The Best Years of Our Lives (1946).

== Legacy ==
Many of Bohnen's works are still exhibited at the Minnesota State Capitol; lesser works are held by private collectors including the collections of the Minnesota Historical Society (MNHS). A collection of letters and papers by Bohnen is held by the Smithsonian Institution in Washington, D.C..

== Gallery ==
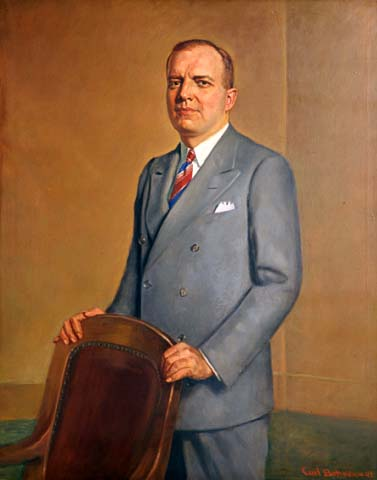
Official Governor portrait of Harold Stassen

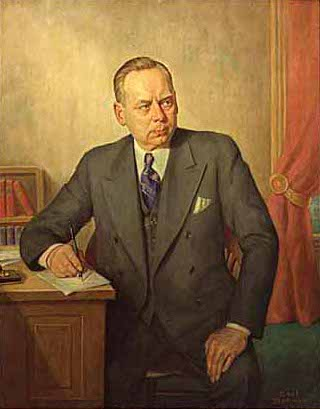
Official Governor portrait of Hjalmar Petersen

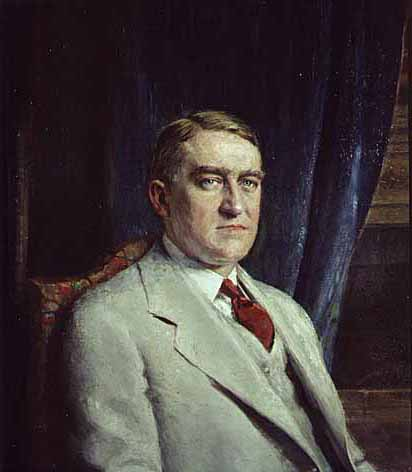
Official Governor portrait of Jacob Aall Ottesen Preus

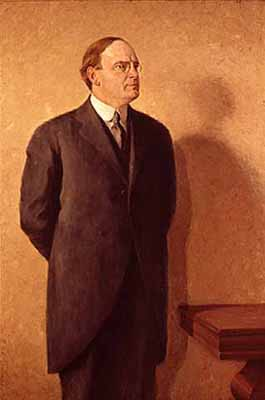
Official Governor portrait of Joseph A. A. Burnquist

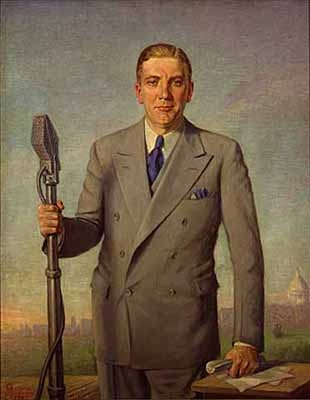
Official Governor portrait of Floyd B. Olson

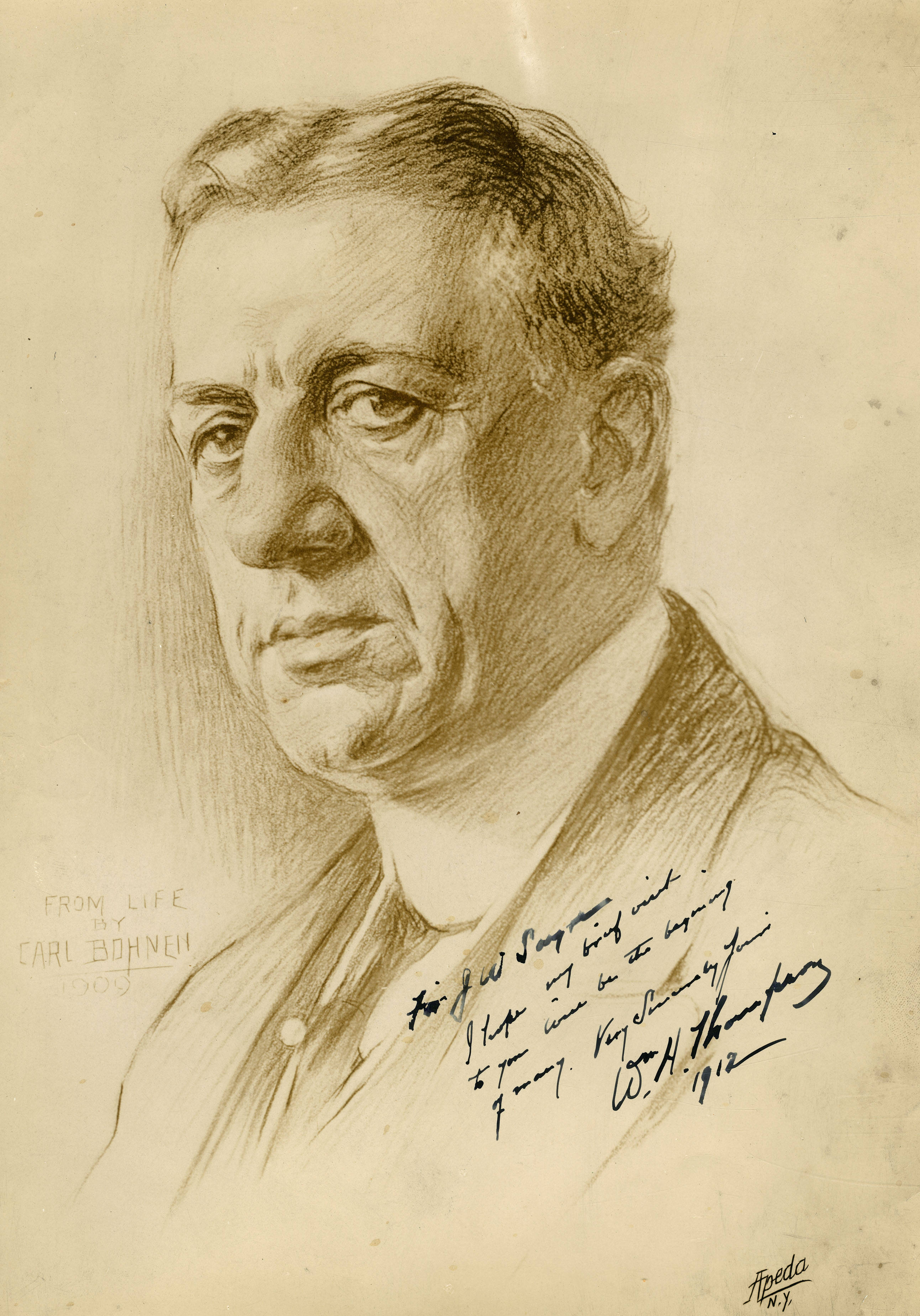
Sketch of William Hale Thompson

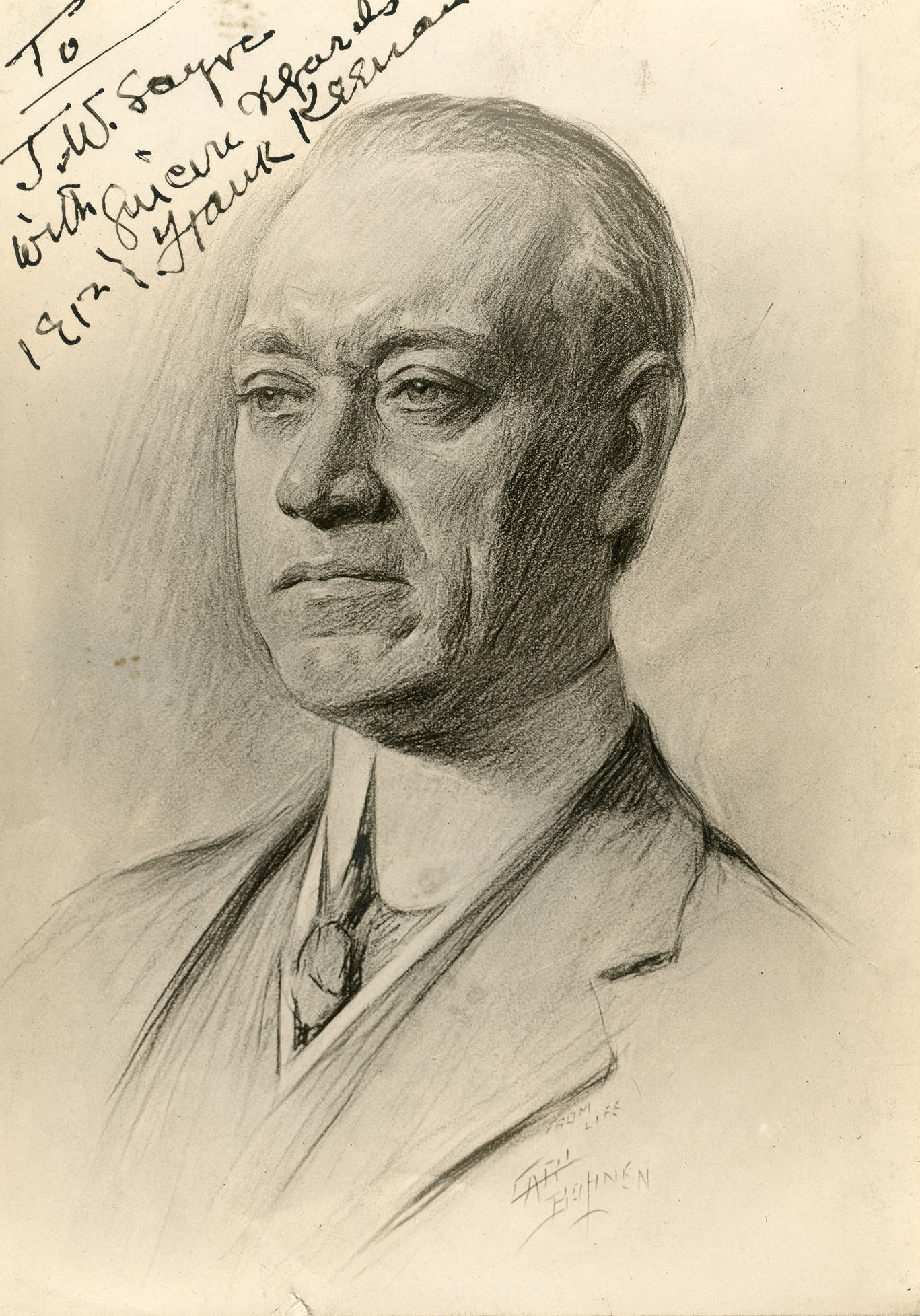
Sketch of Frank Keenan

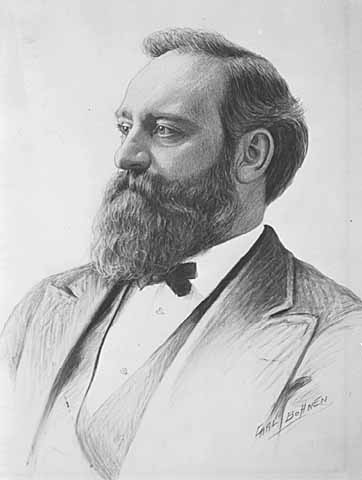
Sketch of Charles McIlrath

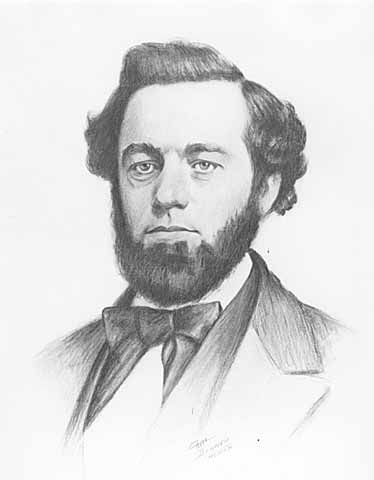
Sketch of Henry C. Rogers

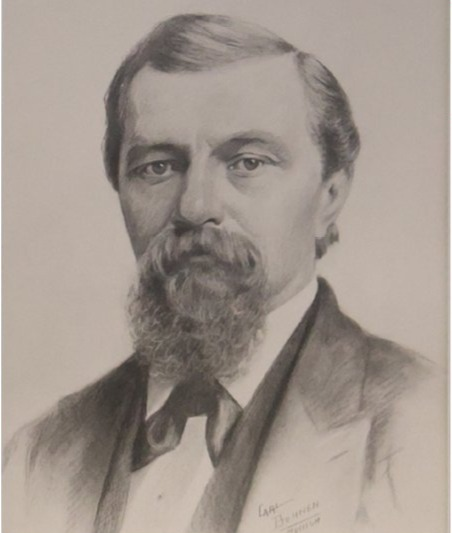
Sketch of John S. Irgens

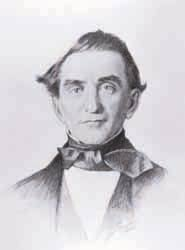
Sketch of Charles K. Smith

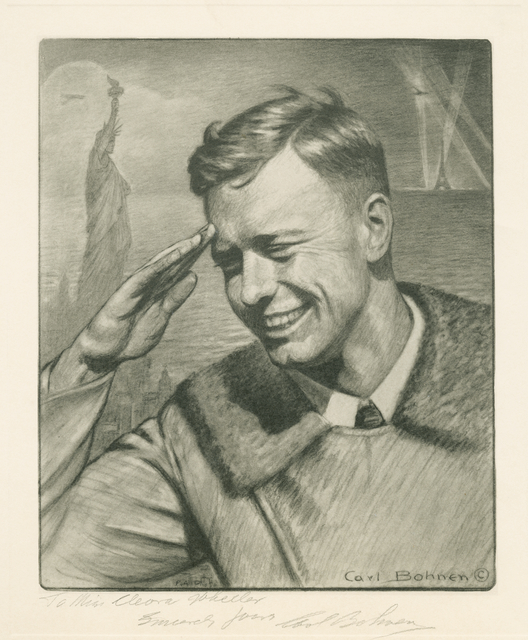
sketch of Charles Lindbergh

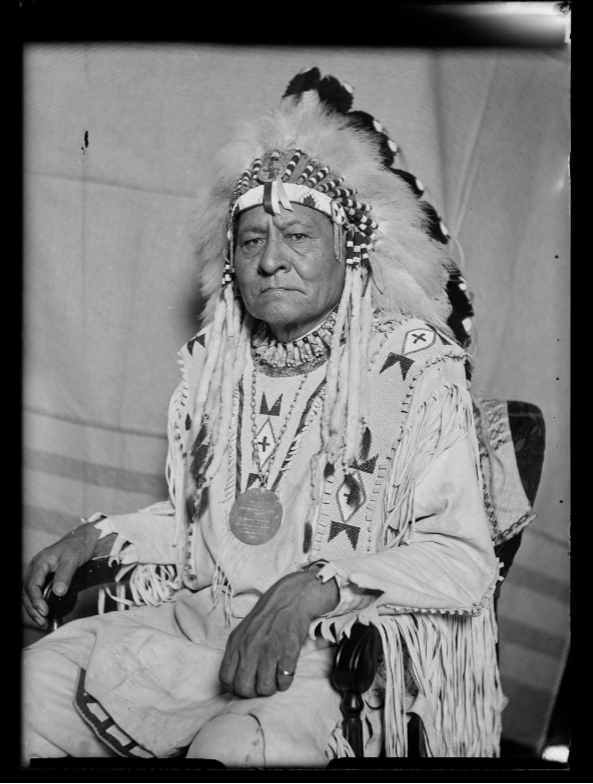
Glass plate photograph of Richard Sanderville

Portrait of Dulcie E. Kees

Portrait of Nanele Kees

Portrait of Elsa Kees

Portrait of Roland Kees

Portrait Philip Arzt Kees

Portrait of Margaret Alma Spengler Geist
