= Who Goes There =

Who Goes There may refer to:

- Who Goes There (album), a 2007 album by Gomez singer and guitarist Ian Ball
- Who Goes There?, a science fiction novella written by John W. Campbell, Jr. under the pen name Don A. Stuart
- Who Goes There! a British play by John Dighton filmed in 1952
- Who Goes There? (collection), a 1952 collection of science fiction stories by author John W. Campbell, Jr.
- Who Goes There? and Other Stories, a 1955 collection of science fiction stories by author John W. Campbell, Jr.
- "Who Goes There", a first-season episode of the True Detective show.
- "Who Goes There", a 2008 episode of The Backyardigans, from the third season.
- "Who Goes There", a song from Bladee's 2016 album Eversince
- "Who Goes There", a song and the second single from The Smashing Pumpkins' 2024 album Aghori Mhori Mei
