= A Dream of Passion =

1978 film directed by Jules Dassin

- French Theatrical Poster
- Directed by: Jules Dassin
- Written by: Jules Dassin; Euripides (play); Minoas Volonakis
- Produced by: Giorgos Arvanitis
- Starring: Melina Mercouri; Ellen Burstyn
- Cinematography: Giorgos Arvanitis
- Edited by: Georges Klotz
- Release date: August 1978
- Running time: 106 minutes
- Countries: Greece; Switzerland
- Languages: English; Greek; Ancient Greek (the chorus in the play speaks Euripides' original text)

A Dream of Passion (Greek: Κραυγή Γυναικών, translit. Kravgi gynaikon, lit. "Cry of Women") is a 1978 Greek drama film directed by Jules Dassin. The story follows Melina Mercouri as Maya, an actress playing Medea, who seeks out Brenda Collins, portrayed by Ellen Burstyn, a woman who is in jail for murdering her own children to punish her husband for his infidelity.

== Plot ==
Maya, a Greek actress who has been working in Hollywood for years, has returned to Athens to play the title role in a stage production of Euripides' Medea. The film follows three main storylines: (a) the production of the play, (b) Maya’s changing approach to how to portray Medea, and (c) the story of Brenda Collins’ murder of her children. These three storylines are intertwined. Early in the film, we see early scenes from the play being rehearsed, the play’s director and Maya argue about Maya’s (first) interpretation of the character of Medea, and Brenda Collins is introduced. In the middle part of the film, scenes from the middle of the play are rehearsed, and Maya's thoughts about Medea begin to change as she learns more about Brenda Collins’ troubled marriage and as her exploration of Medea makes her rethink some difficult episodes in her own life. In the last part of the film, Maya thinks more deeply about her own life, learns more details about the murders of children, and we see scenes from the end of the play—showing Maya’s final interpretation of Medea.

The production of the play is being filmed by a BBC crew. Early in the film, one of Maya's BBC contacts manages to arrange a publicity stunt for Maya, in which Maya will meet an American woman, Brenda Collins, who was imprisoned several years earlier for the murder of her three young children. The Collins family had lived in a suburb of Athens, Glyfada. Brenda committed the murders to punish her husband, Roy, for having an affair with a Greek woman. The press at the time called her "the Medea of Glyfada." Maya happily imagines what the headlines will be after their meeting: "The Two Medeas."

The publicity stunt ends in disaster. Brenda is initially happy and excited about talking with Maya, having never met a movie star before, but she is frightened and then infuriated when the press suddenly rushes into the interview room, snapping photos. She screams obscenities and curses at Maya as a nun pulls Brenda out of the room. Maya is horrified at how the stunt turned out and later sends flowers and a note of apology to Brenda. Brenda agrees to meet Maya again, and the two establish something of a friendship.

To learn more about Brenda Collins, Maya goes to see the publisher of the Kathimerini newspaper, a woman she already knows. She shows Maya the records the paper still has from their coverage of the case, including crime-scene photos, a copy of the note Brenda left for Roy after the murders, and the notes of a psychologist who examined Brenda after the murders. Maya also visits the Collins' former house (which has remained unoccupied—the chalk outlines are still on the floor, showing where the children's bodies were found) and meets with Brenda several more times at the prison.

Brenda Collins is a deeply religious woman. She had been devoted to her husband and children and had begged Roy to stop his affair, but he treated her and her faith with disdain. She talks about the events leading up to the murders and the murders themselves with a mix of anguish and fury and a mix of obscenities and quotes from the Bible. She says that she did not kill her children with the story of Medea in mind; she tells Maya that she didn't understand the reference when the press first started calling her a "Medea."

Maya's research into Brenda's case, looking at it from Brenda's point of view and having rethought difficult events in her own life (in particular, her relationship with her own somewhat estranged husband and her friendship with and later mistreatment of Maria—who was once an actress and is now the prompter for the stage production), causes Maya to rethink her portrayal of Medea. The film ends with a scene of the play's production at the ancient theater at the site of the sanctuary of Apollo at Delphi.

== Titles ==
The original Greek title, Κραυγή Γυναικών, means "Cry of Women." It is adapted from Euripides' Medea, lines 131–33. The lines appear on the screen after the opening credits of the film, with the chorus reciting those lines (and some subsequent lines) in the original ancient Greek:

I heard the cry
of the anguished woman
from Colchis
and my heart suffers too

The English title, A Dream of Passion, comes from Shakespeare's Hamlet (act 2, scene 2).

== Production ==
Jules Dassin discussed A Dream of Passion in an interview for the New York Times in early 1978. He said that the story was inspired by a trial in Italy (fifteen years earlier) of a woman who had killed her children after her husband left her for another woman: “She was so compelling and strong. She sat there grieving for her children and at the same time, not repenting for what she did. She felt she was right to do it.”

Despite being obsessed with the idea of filming the story, Dassin couldn’t “reconcile his compassion for the woman with his horror for her crime.” But after seeing his wife, Melina Mercouri, in a stage production of Medea, he realized how he could approach the story.

About the film, Dassin went on to say, “It’s one of the two films I’ve made that I’ve cared most about, the other being the documentary about the student uprising.”

== Cast ==
- Melina Mercouri as Maya / Medea
- Ellen Burstyn as Brenda Collins
- Andréas Voutsinas as Kostas
- Despo Diamantidou as Maria
- Dimitris Papamichael as Dimitris / Jason
- Giannis Voglis as Edward
- Andreas Philippidis as Stathis
- Phaedon Georgitsis as Ronny
- Betty Valassi as Margaret
- Kostas Arzoglou as the bible student

== Awards ==
It was nominated for the Golden Globe Award for Best Foreign Language Film. It was also nominated for the Golden Palm at the 1978 Cannes Film Festival. Ellen Burstyn's performance was nominated for the Los Angeles Film Critics Association Award for Best Actress.
