= On an Odd Note =

1958 collection of short stories by Gerald Kersh

- First edition cover
- Author: Gerald Kersh
- Cover artist: Richard M. Powers
- Language: English
- Genre: Short stories
- Publisher: Ballantine Books
- Publication date: 1958
- Publication place: United States
- Media type: Print (paperback)
- Pages: 154 pages

On an Odd Note is a collection of short stories written by Gerald Kersh, published as a paperback original by Ballantine Books in 1958. No other editions were issued until 2015, when Valancourt Books brought out a new edition with an introduction by Nick Mamatas.

== Contents ==
- "Seed of Destruction" (Esquire 1947)
- "Frozen Beauty" (John Bull 1941)
- "Reflections in a Tablespoon" (Neither Man Nor Dog 1946)
- "The Crewel Needle" (Lilliput 1953)
- "The Sympathetic Souse" (Lilliput 1954)
- "The Queen of Pig Island (The Strand 1949)
- "Prophet Without Honor" (original)
- "The Beggars’ Stone" (John O'London's Weekly 1941)
- "The Brighton Monster" (The Saturday Evening Post 1948)
- "The Extraordinarily Horrible Dummy (Penguin Parade 1939)
- "Fantasy of a Hunted Man" (John Bull 1942)
- "The Gentleman All in Black" (John Bull 1942)
- "The Eye (The Saturday Evening Post 1957)

"Frozen Beauty", "Fantasy of a Hunted Man" and "The Gentleman All in Black" originally appeared under the "Waldo Keller" byline. "The Beggars' Stone" was originally published as "The Stone". "The Brighton Monster" was originally published as "The Monster". "The Eye" was originally published as "The Murderer's Eye".

== Reception ==
Anthony Boucher, despite faulting the story selection as a chaotic mix of genres, noted that the book "is unified by the ever-captivating Kersh personality." Boucher concluded that while "Mr. Kersh can (and often does) write a trite or inept story, . . . he is incapable of writing a dull sentence."

Everett F. Bleiler found On an Odd Note to be "a collection of Kersh's more important fantastic stories. . . . Good narratives, with unusual detail."
