= Night and the City (1992 film) =

1992 film by Irwin Winkler

- Theatrical release poster
- Directed by: Irwin Winkler
- Screenplay by: Richard Price
- Based on: Night and the City by Gerald Kersh
- Produced by: Irwin Winkler; Jane Rosenthal
- Starring: Robert De Niro; Jessica Lange; Cliff Gorman; Jack Warden; Alan King
- Cinematography: Tak Fujimoto
- Edited by: David Brenner
- Music by: James Newton Howard
- Distributed by: 20th Century Fox
- Release date: October 16, 1992
- Running time: 105 minutes
- Country: United States
- Language: English
- Budget: $18 million
- Box office: $6.2 million

Night and the City is a 1992 American neo-noir crime comedy-drama film and a remake of the 1950 film, itself an adaptation of Gerald Kersh's 1938 novel. The film stars Robert De Niro and Jessica Lange, and is directed by Irwin Winkler from a script by Richard Price.

Night and the City was released by 20th Century Fox on October 16, 1992. The film received mixed reviews from critics and was a box office bomb, grossing $6.2 million against an $18 million budget.

== Plot ==
Harry Fabian is a fast-talking New York City lawyer who hangs out at a bar called Boxers, owned by Phil Nasseros and his wife Helen. Harry has been having an affair with Helen, who dreams of setting up her own bar and leaving Phil. At the bar, Harry spots an article in the New York Post about a man who was pummeled by a boxer. He calls the man on Phil's phone and pitches a lawsuit against the boxer on the grounds that his fists are legally considered weapons. The fighter is promoted by Ira "Boom Boom" Grossman, who tries to muscle Harry away from the idea of suing his boxer. The case is promptly dismissed by the judge, who knows that it is baseless.

Knowing the boxing industry, Harry decides to become a boxing promoter and files for a license. He recruits Boom Boom's estranged brother, former professional prizefighter Al Grossman, to be his partner. Boom Boom tries to muscle out Harry of the fight business, but when Al protects Harry, Boom Boom cowers in fear.

Al asks Phil for a $15,000 loan to cover the cost of the fight. Sensing her opportunity, Helen stages an argument with Harry and demands that he produce $7,500, promising that Phil will match the amount. Helen fronts Harry the $7,500, allowing Harry to secure the loan. Phil promises to pay the money to Harry on the day before the fight.

She gives him another $5,000 to help her set up her own bar by procuring a liquor license. Harry has a friend in the Federal Liquor Administration who supplies him a blank license but asks $7500 for it. Harry has only $5000, so he has a printer put in the printed details, making the license essentially a fake. He gives Helen the licence, but does not tell her all the details of how he got it.

Boom Boom again tries to persuade Harry to abandon the idea, offering him money to walk away from the fight business. Harry explains that he has spent his career in pursuit of quick and easy cases that can be settled for small cash amounts. He tells Boom Boom that in the past, he had a case in which the NYPD had mistakenly beaten up some people in the wrong house because they served a warrant on the wrong house. Instead of taking them to trial, he accepted the NYPD's offer of $20,000 to make the case go away. He insists that, for once, he is not going to take the money and run. Boom Boom threatens to kill Harry if anything happens to Al, who has already had two heart attacks.

After a nasty fight at Boxers, Helen finally leaves Phil. Still intent to keep Harry out of promoting, Boom Boom reveals to Phil that Helen has been sleeping with Harry. Enraged, Phil calls the state liquor authority to inform them that Harry had forged Helen's license. He pretends like everything is fine with Harry, and offers to throw a dinner party the night before the fight. After the party, he tells Harry that he will have the $7,500 the next day, which is the morning of the fight.

Helen wakes up Harry at his place, and they talk about their new endeavors. Her new bar is opening the night of his fight. Harry goes to Boxers and anxiously waits for Phil. When Phil arrives, Harry asks him for the money. Phil says he thought Harry was joking and then he reveals that he knows about his affair with Helen, as he beats up Harry. Desperate to keep the fight afloat, Harry borrows $12,000 from the ruthless loan shark Mr. Peck. At the venue, Al gets into a fight with one of the staff and has a fatal heart attack. With the fight off, Harry goes to Helen's new bar only to find that it has been shut down because of his forged license.

"Boom Boom"'s goons show up to make good on his threat. Harry and Helen run and end up cornered in an alley. Harry tries to talk his way out of what is coming by explaining that the goons should be after the guy who fought with Al and caused his heart attack. He throws Peck's $12,000 in the air as the final exclamation point on his speech and walks Helen past the goons, asking her under his breath, "How'd I do?" The goons shoot Harry in the back and throw their pistols in a dumpster.

The film ends with Helen holding Harry's hand as he is put in an ambulance, still talking optimistically about the future.

== Cast ==
- Robert De Niro as Harry Fabian
- Jessica Lange as Helen Nasseros
- Alan King as Ira "Boom Boom" Grossman
- Jack Warden as Al Grossman
- Cliff Gorman as Phil Nasseros
- Eli Wallach as Mr. Peck
- Barry Primus as Tommy Tessler
- Michael Badalucco as Elaine's Bartender
- Henry Milligan as "Cotton"
- Regis Philbin as himself
- Harsh Nayyar as Faruz

== Production ==
The source novel and the original film featured pro wrestling, which was by the early 1990s targeted mostly at children, instead of boxing. Like the earlier 1950 film noir, the film was released by 20th Century Fox. It was chosen as the closing feature for the 1992 New York Film Festival.

== Critical reception ==
Janet Maslin felt that the film "is colorfully acted and refreshingly free of all the moody cliches such a story might be expected to thrive on. But it is also saddled with overly busy direction that sometimes interferes with the dialogue, making Mr. Price's long, perversely elegant conversational riffs hard to hear." Writing for The Washington Post, Desson Howe began his review, "There are few finer pleasures than watching Robert De Niro when he's on. In "Night and the City," he lights up the board as Harry Fabian, New York City's biggest shyster." Howe concluded that De Niro's performance was one of his best.

Roger Ebert disagreed, dismissing De Niro's work as "more like a riff on Rupert Pupkin, the goofy talk show fan he played in Scorsese's The King of Comedy". Ebert and Howe both agreed, however, that Alan King's performance was fantastic. Owen Gleiberman concurred in his review, but he sided with Ebert regarding De Niro, concluding, "the actor who once seemed the heir to Brando, Clift, and, yes, Widmark — the actor who once got so far inside his roles that he just about detonated the screen — now plays characters who don't seem to have any inner life at all." David Ansen praised the actors in his review: "De Niro is a sensationally manic-and even touching-sleaze; King, Warden and Gorman are splendidly disreputable, and Lange gives her role a tough/tender sexuality that's a pleasure to watch even when her character's loyalty to Harry confounds sense."

As of April 2019, Night and the City holds a rating of 57% on Rotten Tomatoes based on 14 reviews.

== See also ==
- List of boxing films
