= Roman Bohnen =

American actor (1901–1949)

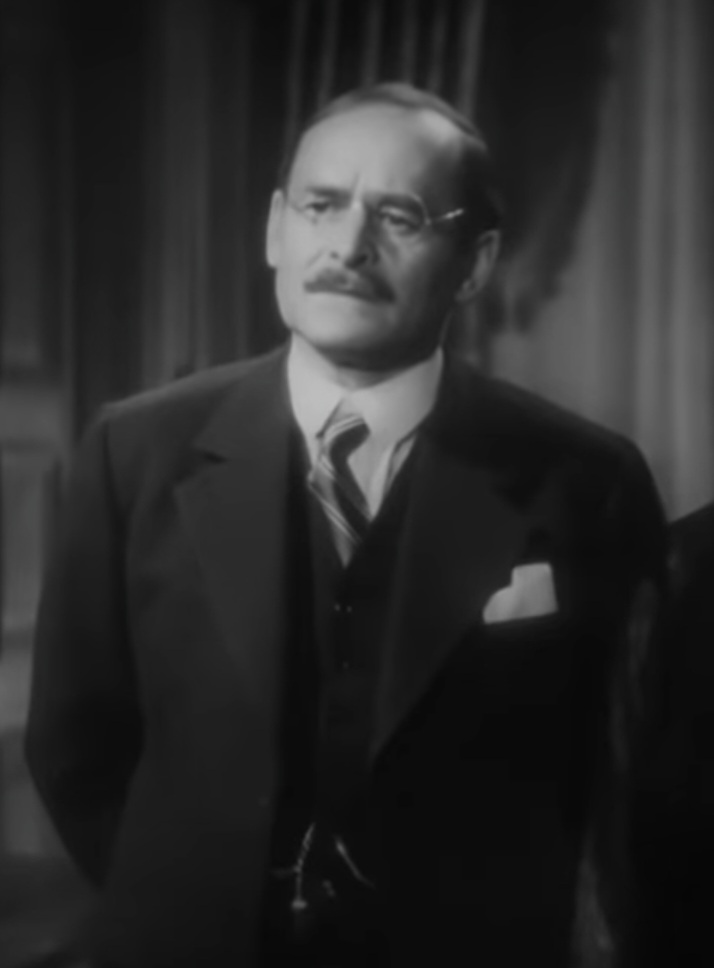
- Bohnen in The Strange Love of Martha Ivers (1946)
- Born: Roman Aloys Bohnen; November 24, 1901; Saint Paul, Minnesota, U.S.
- Died: February 24, 1949 (aged 47); Hollywood, Los Angeles, California, U.S.
- Resting place: Holy Cross Cemetery, Culver City, California
- Education: University of Minnesota
- Occupation: Actor
- Years active: 1931–1949
- Spouse: Hildur Ourse (m. 1930; died 1941)
- Children: 1
- Father: Carl Bohnen

Roman Aloys Bohnen (November 24, 1901 – February 24, 1949) was an American actor. He is perhaps best known for his roles in the films Of Mice and Men (1939), The Song of Bernadette (1943), and The Best Years of Our Lives (1946).

== Early life and education ==
Bohnen was born in St. Paul, Minnesota, the son of Carl Bohnen, a portrait painter. Carl Bohnen has been described as "perennially impoverished" during Bohnen's youth, and Roman Bohnen "spent his youth thinking of ways to keep the family solvent."

He attended the University of Minnesota, where he was a cheerleader. After graduating in 1923 with a B.A., Roman served his acting apprenticeship in theater companies in St. Paul and Chicago, eventually spending five years with the Goodman Theatre. At the Goodman, he met fellow actor Hildur Ouse, who became his wife.

== Career ==
=== Group Theatre ===
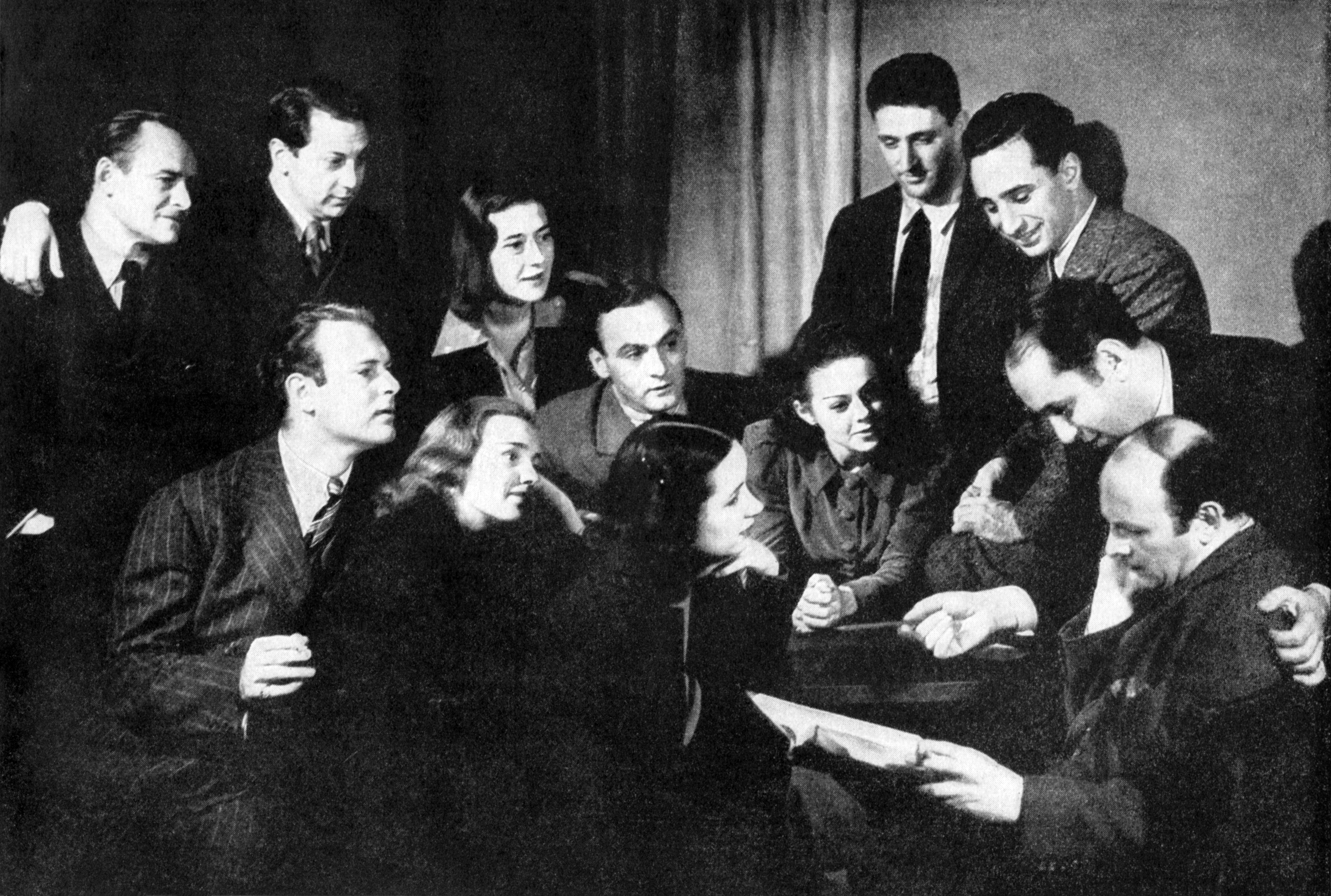
Roman Bohnen (left, beside Luther Adler) with members of the Group Theatre in 1938

The Bohnens moved to New York City, where he made his Broadway debut in 1931 in As Husbands Go. Bohnen, In the summer of 1932, at the behest of his friend from the Goodman Theatre Art Smith, he was invited to join the Group Theatre, which became his artistic home for the next nine years. As a member of the Group, he appeared in numerous plays and was active in all aspects of the company. In her book on the Group Theatre, author Wendy Smith observes that Bohnen "fit easily and naturally into the Group" and was appreciated for his sense of humor, generosity and hard work. Smith wrote that Bohnen, a former cheerleader, "was still a cheerleader for any cause that attracted him."

On January 2, 1933, Bohnen took over a lead part in the Group's hit play, Success Story by John Howard Lawson. The very next day, Incubator, a play Bohnen had written with John Lyman, opened on Broadway (produced by another organization). Although Incubator received favorable reviews, it closed quickly. In the plays written by his friend, Clifford Odets, for the Group Theatre, he created the roles of Dr. Barnes in Waiting for Lefty, Schlosser in Awake and Sing!, Gus Michaels in Paradise Lost, Tom Moody in Golden Boy and Mr. Tucker in Night Music.

Bohnen spent the summer of 1936 at Pine Brook Country Club in Nichols, Connecticut. Pinebrook is best known for that year's summer rehearsal venue of the Group Theatre. Some of the other artists who summered there were Elia Kazan, Harry Morgan, John Garfield, Lee J. Cobb, Will Geer, Clifford Odets, Howard Da Silva and Irwin Shaw. The Group Theatre disbanded in 1941, the same year that Hildur died.

=== Films ===
After the failure of a play called Five Alarm Waltz in 1941, Bohnen and his daughter Marina moved to Hollywood. His first film was the Vogues of 1938 (1937). By 1941, he was working almost exclusively in film. Among his better-known roles are Candy in Of Mice and Men (1939) and Pat Derry in The Best Years of Our Lives (1946). He also played Durand Laxart, Joan's uncle, who takes her to see the Dauphin of France, in the Ingrid Bergman film, Joan of Arc (1948). He played the Old Man in Jules Dassin's short film The Tell-Tale Heart (1941)

Bohnen was cast as President Harry Truman in The Beginning or the End, an MGM docu-drama about the atomic bomb. After a private screening in late 1946, Truman let it be known that he disapproved of his portrayal regarding the decision to drop atomic bombs on Japan. On December 2, 1946, Bohnen wrote Truman that he should portray himself. On December 12, Truman responded to Bohnen's letter, but declined the chance to portray himself, and said that he was "sure you (Bohnen) will do the part creditably". Ultimately, the scenes were re-shot with actor Art Baker re-cast as Truman.

=== Actors' Laboratory ===
With other former Group Theatre actors, he was co-founder of the politically active Actors' Laboratory Theatre, serving on its executive board. The Actors' Laboratory was accused of Communist leanings, and in February 1948 Bohnen and other members of the group were subpoenaed to appear before a California Senate committee. He and the others refused to answer questions about whether or not they had ever been Communists. Subsequently, the U.S. Internal Revenue Service revoked the Actors' Laboratory's tax-exempt status. Bohnen worked hard to keep the group alive, and was recognized as the "driving force behind all of its activities. The Actors' Laboratory folded in 1950.

== Personal life and death ==
The Bohnens had a daughter in 1936, Marina. Hildur died in 1941.

While performing in a Lab production, Bohnen collapsed as the curtain fell on the second act. He had been suffering from a heart ailment. Bohnen was survived by his daughter, father, sister, and brother.

In her book on the Group Theater, Real Life Drama, author Wendy Smith wrote that the stress of the Lab's difficulties, and his personal problems as a single parent, contributed to his death.

== Filmography ==
- Walter Wanger's Vogues of 1938 (1937) as Morgan's Lawyer (uncredited)
- 52nd Street (1937) as James
- Of Mice and Men (1939) as Candy
- So Ends Our Night (1941) as Mr. Kern
- They Dare Not Love (1941) as Baron Shafter
- The Tell-Tale Heart (1941, Short) as Old Man
- Appointment for Love (1941) as Dr. Gunther
- The Bugle Sounds (1942) as Mr. Leech
- Young America (1942) as Mr. Barnes
- The Affairs of Jimmy Valentine (1942) as Tom Forbes/Jimmy Valentine
- Grand Central Murder (1942) as Ramon
- The Hard Way (1943) as Sam Chernen (uncredited)
- Edge of Darkness (1943) as Lars Malken
- Mission to Moscow (1943) as Mr. Krestinsky
- The Song of Bernadette (1943) as François Soubirous
- The Hitler Gang (1944) as Captain Ernst Röhm
- The Hairy Ape (1944) as Paddy
- None But the Lonely Heart (1944) as Dad Pettyjohn
- Counter-Attack (1945) as Kostyuk
- A Bell for Adano (1945) as Carl Erba
- Miss Susie Slagle's (1946) as Dean Wingate
- Deadline at Dawn (1946) as Frantic Man with Injured Cat
- Two Years Before the Mast (1946) as Macklin
- The Hoodlum Saint (1946) as Father O'Doul
- Winter Wonderland (1946) as Timothy Wheeler
- The Strange Love of Martha Ivers (1946) as Mr. O'Neil
- Mr. Ace (1946) as Prof. Joshua L. Adams
- The Best Years of Our Lives (1946) as Pat Derry
- California (1947) as Col. Stuart
- Brute Force (1947) as Warden A.J. Barnes
- Song of Love (1947) as Dr. Hoffman
- For You I Die (1947) as Smitty
- Open Secret (1948) as Roy Locke
- Arch of Triumph (1948) as Dr. Veber
- Night Has a Thousand Eyes (1948) as Melville Weston, Special Prosecutor
- Joan of Arc (1948) as Durand Laxart (Joan's uncle)
- Kazan (1949) as Maitlin
- Mr. Soft Touch (1949) as Barney Teener (final film role)
