= 10:30 P.M. Summer =

1966 film

- Theatrical release poster
- Directed by: Jules Dassin
- Written by: Jules Dassin; Marguerite Duras
- Based on: 10:30 on a Summer Night by Marguerite Duras
- Produced by: Jules Dassin; Anatole Litvak
- Starring: Melina Mercouri; Romy Schneider; Peter Finch
- Cinematography: Gábor Pogány
- Edited by: Roger Dwyre
- Music by: Cristóbal Halffter
- Distributed by: Lopert Pictures Corporation
- Release date: October 24, 1966
- Running time: 85 minutes
- Country: United States
- Language: English

10:30 P.M. Summer is a 1966 American independent drama film directed by Jules Dassin and starring Melina Mercouri, Romy Schneider, and Peter Finch. It is based on the 1960 novel 10:30 on a Summer Night by French author Marguerite Duras, who co-wrote the screenplay adaptation with Dassin.

== Plot ==
Maria and Paul, a couple in their forties, and their young daughter travel through Spain with Claire, a younger woman.

On their way to Madrid, they stop in a small town and learn that a local man who has killed his wife and her lover is on the loose in the area. There is a massive thunderstorm and the group has no choice but to stay in the town's only hotel, which is jammed beyond capacity with other travelers in the same situation. Maria, an alcoholic who lives her life in a dream state, seems to be subtly encouraging her husband to have a sexual relationship with Claire.

While the thunderstorm is still raging, Maria drinks a bottle of alcohol outside and sees Paul and Claire kissing on a balcony. She then discovers the fugitive hiding on a rooftop and wants to help him escape. She drives the man to a spot in the desert where he can hide.

The next day, Maria tells Paul and Claire about the man, but when they look for him in the desert, Paul discovers his dead body; the man has committed suicide. Maria, Paul, and Claire resolve to keep quiet and travel on to Madrid as planned.

In Madrid, Maria tells Paul and Claire that she had hoped to add the fugitive to their odd group as a "fourth player" in the game, but that her true desire is to sleep with Paul once again. Maria drinks herself unconscious and envisions Paul and Claire making love. The next day, she tells Paul about her dream and it seems to excite him. They start to make love, but she stops him and tells him that she no longer loves him. Paul says that he does not believe her.

The trio go to a club to watch flamenco dancers. Maria, drunk and enjoying herself, slips out during the performance and disappears into the city. Paul and Claire search for her in vain.

== Cast ==
- Melina Mercouri as Maria
- Romy Schneider as Claire
- Peter Finch as Paul
- Julián Mateos as Rodrigo Paestra
- Isabel María Pérez as Judith
- Beatriz Savón as Rodrigo's Wife

== Reception ==
In a contemporary (1966) review for The New York Times, critic Bosley Crowther wrote: "Evidently what Jules Dassin was trying to do in this film ... was to give a bizarre illustration of a woman's morbid moods when she is trapped by a realization of the evanescence of love. Toward this end, he has filled the picture with a lot of bizarrerie–lashing rain, flashing lights, flamenco dancers, writhing bodies in the nude. But this sort of thing–and the performing–is as sodden and lacking in a sense of genuine human feeling as a rain-drenched electric sign. It is strictly mechanical flamboyance to make an old-fashioned show, and it glistens without warmth or meaning through the splattering rain and the booze."
