= Whatever Happened to Corporal Cuckoo? =

Short science fiction story by Gerald Kersh

"Whatever Happened to Corporal Cuckoo?" is a short story by Gerald Kersh. It is a science fiction story, dealing with a tale of a man who has had immortality thrust upon him in a way that does not benefit him at all. It was first published in Kersh's own collection, The Brighton Monster and Other Stories (Heinemann, 1953) and later collected, first in the anthology Star Science Fiction Stories #3 (Ballantine Books, 1954), edited by Frederik Pohl, then in the anthology One Hundred Years of Science Fiction (Simon & Schuster, 1968), edited by Damon Knight.

== Plot ==
In July 1945, at the conclusion of the war in Europe, a war correspondent by the name of Kersh is on board the RMS Queen Mary with thousands of American soldiers returning home. He expects to be sent to the Pacific to cover the conflict there. While drinking the last of the whisky he smuggled aboard for the days of the voyage, he is accosted by Corporal Cuckoo, a man apparently about 30 years old covered in battle scars, more than could be had in the latest war, and more than an ordinary man could survive.

Cuckoo tells his tale after downing all the remaining whisky. He was born in France in 1507 and named Lecoq, but gained the name "Lecocu" after he was cuckolded by his wife. Under that name he served as a foot soldier, and was mortally wounded at the Battle of Turin in 1537. He took a deep wound in his skull, but after treatment by Ambroise Paré using his own "Digestive", he came back to life. Paré tried to keep Lecocu for his own study, but Lecocu escaped with a copy of Paré's notes on the creation of the Digestive. Lecocu was illiterate but eventually found a student in Paris who could read the notes. The Digestive was originally just turpentine, egg yolks and oil of roses, but Paré added honey for Lecocu's treatment. Lecocu had by this time realized that any wound he received healed quickly. He intended to recreate the Digestive and sell it, but despite following Paré's procedure carefully he could not get the same results. As the years passed he realized he did not age, and could not die. He became a pirate, then returned to soldiering and participated in many famous battles in history. He met figures such as Paracelsus and William Shakespeare. Despite this, he could not be anything other than a simple soldier, unable to hang on to money or learn anything beyond what he already knew. Having fought in World War 2 he intended to live in America, grow roses, and keep chickens and bees. He still wants to recreate the Digestive and use it get rich.

Kersh finds the tale incredible, but recognizes the names and battles Cuckoo describes. He cautions him that he may never recreate the Digestive. All the ingredients are products of nature, which vary from place to place, and in the case of honey, sometimes from day to day. The lucky combination that healed him may be impossible to find. Cuckoo gives him a final demonstration of his ability by almost cutting his thumb off and then having it heal within minutes, then becomes angry and storms off, never to be seen again. Kersh ends the story by appealing for anybody who remembers seeing him and can help Kersh to find him again.
