= The Tell-Tale Heart (1941 film) =

1941 film

- Film poster
- Directed by: Jules Dassin
- Written by: Doane R. Hoag
- Based on: The Tell-Tale Heart by Edgar Allan Poe
- Starring: Joseph Schildkraut; Roman Bohnen
- Cinematography: Paul C. Vogel
- Edited by: Adrienne Fazan
- Music by: Sol Kaplan
- Distributed by: MGM
- Release date: October 25, 1941
- Running time: 20 minutes
- Country: United States
- Language: English

The Tell-Tale Heart is a 1941 American drama film, 20 minutes long, directed by Jules Dassin. The screenplay by Doane R. Hoag is based on the 1843 short story of the same name by Edgar Allan Poe.

The film marked Dassin's directorial debut after working as an assistant to Alfred Hitchcock and Garson Kanin. It is typical of the short film adaptations of literary classics studios produced to precede the feature film during the 1930s and 1940s.

== Plot ==
After years' subjection to verbal and emotional abuse by his master, a young weaver decides to murder him. Before the elderly man dies, he predicts his killer eventually will succumb to an overwhelming sense of guilt and betray himself.

Shortly after the man's death, the weaver begins to hear various sounds - a ticking clock, a dripping faucet, and rain falling into a metal pan outside the window - that convince him he can hear his victim's heart still beating beneath the floorboards where he buried him. When two deputy sheriffs appear at the house the following day, he confesses to his crime to clear his tortured conscience.

== Cast ==
- Joseph Schildkraut as Young Man
- Roman Bohnen as Old Man
- Oscar O'Shea as First Deputy Sheriff (Uncredited)
- Will Wright as Second Deputy Sheriff (Uncredited)

== Critical analysis ==
From contemporary reviews, Motion Picture Daily described the film as a "different kind of short", noting its lack of speech and letting the actions speak for themselves. The review went on to state that Dassin has "skillfully translated a short story to the screen in literal form." concluding that "discriminating audiences will probably be more impressed than the general." Showmen's Trade Review declared that the film described the film as worthy of winning an Academy Award specifically for "elevating the quality of the short subject beyond that of most features, for setting a new standard in short subject production, direction and acting." The reviewer praised director Jules Dassin for "skillful handing of a difficult assignment" and Doan Hoag for "a laudable script".

In an article about Jules Dassin written the week of his death, Time film critic Richard Corliss called The Tell-Tale Heart "possibly the very first movie to be influenced by Citizen Kane ... This short film ... is positively a-swill in Orson Wellesian tropes: the crouching camera, the chiaroscuro lighting, the mood-deepening use of silences and sound effects."

== DVD release ==
The film is a bonus feature on the Region 1 DVD box set The Complete Thin Man Collection, released by Warner Home Video on August 2, 2005.
