= Hamilchama al hashalom =

- Directed by: Jules Dassin
- Written by: Irwin Shaw
- Produced by: Irwin Shaw, Jules Dassin (Paris)
- Narrated by: Jules Dassin (English version); Claude Dauphin (French version)
- Cinematography: Christian Darraux; Daniel Vogel
- Edited by: Roger Dwyre; Michele Neny
- Music by: Irwin Bazelon
- Distributed by: United Film Enterprises
- Release date: 11 June 1968
- Running time: 70 minutes
- Countries: Israel; United States; France
- Language: English

Hamilchama al hashalom is a 1968 film directed by Jules Dassin. A version in French was released under the title Comme un éclair, and the English language release was titled Survival 1967.

== Synopsis ==
This film documentary uses the 1967 Six-Day War and its immediate aftermath as its basis. The material primarily presents Israeli sources and perspectives. It has been characterized as an anti-war screed. The film was panned for presenting little footage documenting the war, as well as for conflicting, alternating viewpoints and overall lack of narrative focus.
