= Jules Dassin =

American filmmaker, theatre director and actor (1911–2008)

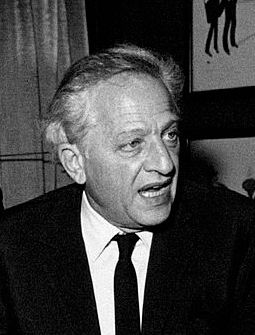
- Dassin in 1970
- Born: Julius Dassin; December 18, 1911; Middletown, Connecticut, U.S.
- Died: March 31, 2008 (aged 96); Ygeia Hospital, Marousi, Greece
- Resting place: First Cemetery of Athens
- Other name: Perlo Vita
- Occupations: Director; producer; writer; actor
- Years active: 1936–2008
- Spouses: Beatrice Launer (m. 1933; div. 1962) Melina Mercouri (m. 1966; died 1994)
- Children: 3, including Joe
- Relatives: Stamatis Merkouris (father-in-law); George S. Mercouris (paternal uncle-in-law); Spyridon Mercouris (paternal grandfather-in-law)
- Awards: Full list

Julius "Jules" Dassin (/ˈdæsɪn, dæˈsɪn/ DASS-in, dass-IN; December 18, 1911 – March 31, 2008) was an American film and theatre director, producer, writer and actor. A subject of the Hollywood blacklist, he subsequently moved to France, and later Greece, where he continued his career. He was best-known for his noir and crime films, though he also worked in other genres. He won the Best Director Award at the 1955 Cannes Film Festival for his pioneering heist film Rififi, and received Academy Award nominations for Best Director and Best Original Screenplay for Never on Sunday (1960).

He adapted Never on Sunday into the stage musical Illya Darling, earning Tony nominations for Best Musical and Best Direction of a Musical. Dassin's other notable films included Brute Force (1947), The Naked City (1948), Thieves' Highway (1949), Night and the City (1950), Topkapi (1964), and Uptight (1968).

Dassin was the husband of Greek actress and activist Melina Mercouri, and the father of singer-songwriter Joe Dassin. He was a member of the Academy of Motion Picture Arts and Sciences and the Directors Guild of America.

== Biography ==
=== Early life ===
Julius Dassin was born in Middletown, Connecticut, on December 18, 1911, to Bertha (née Vogel) and Samuel Dassin, a barber. His parents were both Jewish immigrants from Odessa, Russian Empire (present-day Ukraine). Julius had seven siblings, including four brothers, Louis C., Benjamin, Irving and Edward; and three sisters.

In 1915, when Julius was three years old, the Dassin family moved to Harlem, New York. He attended public grammar school where he received his first acting role in a school play. Julius was given a small part but when came time to speak his only line, he fainted due to stage fright. He also learned to play the piano at a young age. During his youth he attended Camp Kinderland, a left-wing Yiddish youth camp.

Julius attended Morris High School in the Bronx. He started acting professionally in 1926, at the age of fourteen, with the Yiddish Art Theatre in New York City. On October 13, 1929, newspaper columnist Mark Hellinger printed a story given to him by Dassin in the New York Daily News; nearly twenty years later, the two would work together in Hollywood.

On July 11, 1933, Julius' older brother Louis was arrested in Meriden, Connecticut when he confessed to the theft of $12,000 from the Puritan Bank and Trust Company, where he worked as a teller and treasurer. On September 10, 1933, when he was 21 years old, Julius married Beatrice Launer, a concert violinist and a graduate of the Juilliard School of Music.

Beginning in 1934, Julius spent three years studying dramatic technique in Europe. He spent time in Italy, France, Spain, Germany, the Soviet Union, U.K., Czechoslovakia, Portugal, Switzerland and Greece, working odd jobs to sustain himself.

=== New York theatre and radio career ===
After returning from Europe in 1936, Dassin joined the Children's Theatre, a division of the Federal Theatre Project during the Great Depression. It was during this time that he joined the Communist Party USA (CPUSA). The troupe put on children's plays at the Adelphi Theatre in New York City. During this time, he played the role of Zar in The Emperor's New Clothes in September 1936, and the role of Oakleaf in Revolt of the Beavers, which ran from May 20, 1937, to June 19, 1937. The later play was criticized as strongly communist.

He later joined up with the Artef Players, a Yiddish Proletarian Theater company in 1937, serving as an actor, set designer, set builder, stage director and even ticket salesman. Beginning on October 5, 1937, he appeared in Moyshe Kulbak's play The Outlaw, which had been adapted by Chaver Paver at The Artef Theatre He also appeared in Artef Players' Recruits and 200,000. On November 5, 1938, Dassin's wife Beatrice gave birth to their first child, son Joseph. In October 1939, he acted in Chaver Paver's Clinton Street, which was staged at the Mercury Theatre, after Orson Welles' troupe had left for Hollywood and the Radio-Keith-Orpheum circuit. Since the pay was poor with Artef Players, Dassin formed a theatre troupe to tour the Borscht Circuit in the Catskills as summer stock.

Dassin acted in a movie scripted and directed by Jack Skurnick, which was shown to a small group at a space that Skurnick rented in New York but was never exhibited beyond that.

He then wrote sketches for radio, at times directing his own radio plays, and became a stage director and producer. In April 1939, Dassin adapted Nicolai Gogol's story The Overcoat for the CBS variety program The Kate Smith Hour, which starred Burgess Meredith and was broadcast live on April 20, 1939. In early 1940, Dassin staged and directed the play Medicine Show for producer Martin Gabel, starring Isabel Bonner, Philip Bourneuf and Norman Lloyd. Although it was well received by critics, Medicine Show only ran for 35 performances at the New Yorker Theatre, from April 12, 1940, to May 11, 1940.

=== Working in Hollywood ===
==== RKO Radio Pictures (1940) ====
In June 1940, Dassin was signed to a term contract with Hollywood film studio RKO Radio Pictures as a director. He was immediately assigned as an assistant director to learn the motion picture business, working under Garson Kanin on They Knew What They Wanted (1940) and Alfred Hitchcock on Mr. and Mrs. Smith (1941), both starring Carole Lombard and both under the supervision of producer Harry E. Edington. During the filming of Mr. and Mrs. Smith, Dassin's wife Beatrice gave birth to their second child, daughter Richelle. By January 1941, after six months without a proper directorial job, Dassin was released from his RKO Radio Pictures contract.

Dassin returned to radio work in Hollywood, presenting his previously adapted Gogol story The Overcoat for a repeat performance on The Kate Smith Hour, this time starring Henry Hull, which was broadcast live on January 3, 1941. He was also one of the several actors who formed the Actors' Laboratory Theatre.

==== Metro-Goldwyn-Mayer and loan-out to Eagle-Lion Films (1941–1946) ====
Wanting to prove that he could direct motion pictures, Dassin approached Metro-Goldwyn-Mayer in the spring of 1941 offering his services for free. He told the studio that he would direct any film for free; the studio instead offered to pay him to direct a short film. Dassin made his directorial debut with a short film of Edgar Allan Poe's The Tell-Tale Heart. Filmed in June 1941 and released on October 25, 1941, the success of the picture led to his hasty promotion as a feature film director and the signing of an exclusive five-year contract in early November 1941. Dassin was promoted from the short story department to the feature film department by Metro-Goldwyn-Mayer at the same time as Fred Zinnemann and Fred Wilcox.

His feature film debut at Metro-Goldwyn-Mayer was the low-budget spy thriller Nazi Agent (originally announced under the titles Salute to Courage, House of Spies and Out of the Past), under the supervision of producer Irving Asher and starring Conrad Veidt, in the dual roles of twin brothers, and Ann Ayars. Released in early 1942, the film received immediate critical acclaim and was a box office success, with Dassin being compared to Orson Welles and Alfred Hitchcock.

Dassin followed with the romantic comedy The Affairs of Martha (originally announced under the title Once Upon a Thursday), starring Marsha Hunt and Richard Carlson, and under the supervision of producer Irving Starr. The film was made in early 1942 on a limited budget. When released in mid-1942, the film was a moderate success and again Dassin was highlighted in the reviews.

In mid-February 1942, it was reported that Dassin would direct a film titled Men at Sea from a Marine Corps story by Alma Rivkin (possibly a typo for Allen Rivkin) starring Philip Dorn. The film was presumably abandoned. In April 1942, it was reported that Dassin would be one of eight directors, along with Fred Zinnemann, Fred Wilcox, Charles Lederer, Edward Cahn, Joseph M. Newman and David Miller, to film a sequence for a planned patriotic anthology film at Metro-Goldwyn-Mayer titled Now We Are 21. The film was to be produced by B. F. Zeidman and scripted by Peter Ruric from a story by Jerry Schwartz. Actors such as Gene Kelly, Ray McDonald, Virginia O'Brien, James Warren, Tatricia Dane, Johnny Davis and Barry Wilson were to appear in the film, but it was never made.

Joan Crawford, one of Metro-Goldwyn-Mayer's biggest stars at the time, watched a private screening of Nazi Agent, after which she rushed to Louis B. Mayer's office insisting that Dassin direct her upcoming World War II drama vehicle, Reunion in France (originally announced simply as Reunion). The picture was being produced by Joseph L. Mankiewicz and was to co-star Philip Dorn and John Wayne. Crawford also requested that Ann Ayars, who co-starred in Nazi Agent, be given the second female lead in her film. Dassin was notified of this new assignment on May 19, 1942, and the press reported that he had been promoted to become an "A movie" director. On the first day of shooting, Dassin yelled "cut" while Crawford was performing, which deeply upset the actress and led her to rush into Mayer's office. Dassin was called into Mayer's office and told that his career as a film director was over. To his surprise, Crawford invited the young director to have dinner at her house later that night and the two became dear friends; the next day, Dassin resumed his directorial duty on the film. The film opened to theatres in December 1942 but received mixed opinions from critics who found its pace too slow.

After completing Reunion in France, it was reported that Dassin received a leave of absence from Metro-Goldwyn-Mayer to act in a stage production of William Shakespeare's Richard III on Broadway. The play was to be directed by and starring John Carradine, though it is unknown if this production came through. Dassin was also employed by Frank Tuttle as one of the lecturers for Hollywood School for Writers' new film directing class, along with Fred Zinnemann, Irving Pichel and László Benedek.

In mid-November 1942, he was assigned to direct another romantic comedy, Young Ideas (originally announced as Faculty Row), under the supervision of producer Robert Sisk. The film was shot from mid-December 1942 to early 1943 and starred Susan Peters, Herbert Marshall and Mary Astor. The film was released in the summer of 1943 and received favorable reviews as a light comedy. In March 1943, Dassin joined the Academy of Motion Picture Arts and Sciences.

In September 1943, after several months without a project, Dassin took over the directorial duties on a comedy film adaptation of Oscar Wilde's The Canterville Ghost. Original director Norman Z. McLeod had departed after five weeks of shooting, following a clash with producer Arthur Field and the cast, which included Charles Laughton, Robert Young and Margaret O'Brien. The film finished shooting in December 1943 and was released in the summer of 1944. Between the filming of scenes, Laughton often asked Dassin to play Russian classical songs on the piano, of which both were fond. The Canterville Ghost was very well received by critics and won a Retro Hugo Award for Best Dramatic Presentation in 2020.

In January 1944, producer Edwin H. Knopf selected Dassin to direct the suspense drama Secrets in the Dark (originally announced as Strangers in the Dark and The Outward Room). The motion picture was based on Millen Brand's novel The Outward Room and from the existing play version The World We Make, which had been adapted by Sidney Kingsley. The plot was that of a middle-class girl who escapes from an insane asylum and develops a love affair with a blue collar steel worker, and in turn overcomes her phobias. The property was developed as a starring vehicle for Susan Peters, newly promoted Metro-Goldwyn-Mayer starlet. Gene Kelly was first cast as the male lead in January 1944, though he was replaced by Robert Young in February 1944. Other cast members included Fortunio Bononova, Katharine Balfour, Felix Bressart, Alexander Granach, Peggy Maley, Marta Linden, Morris Ankrum, Sharon McManus and Betty Lawler.

Secrets in the Dark was to start shooting on February 20, 1944, with cinematographer Robert Planck, but was pushed back to early March 1944 due to production delays. On April 1, 1944, Peters was admitted into Santa Monica Hospital for abdominal pain and underwent major surgery. Her recovery took several months, postponing the films' production indefinitely. Reports varied as to how much footage was shot; some reported as little as ten-day of filming, while others stated that the film was nearly completed. By the time that Peters had recovered in the summer of 1944, Dassin was on a voluntary leave from the studio, so Peters was instead assigned to Keep Your Powder Dry (originally announced as Women in Uniform) for director Edward Buzzell. When Dassin finally returned to work for Metro-Goldwyn-Mayer in mid-1945, Peters had undergone another series of surgeries (due to an accidental shotgun discharge on January 1, 1945), which put her in a wheelchair. Peter's character in Secrets in the Dark was to be rewritten as a paraplegic, but the film was instead permanently shelved.

When Secrets in the Dark was first postponed in early April 1944, Dassin started acting in night plays at the Actors' Laboratory Theatre as part of the War Charities benefits. The first play in which he acted was Night Lodging, followed by The Lower Depths. In May 1944, Dassin teamed up with Arthur Lubin to set up the Soldier Shows Stock Company, a project to put on plays featuring wounded war veterans at Torney General Hospital in Palm Springs, California.

In June 1944, Metro-Goldwyn-Mayer announced that Dassin had been assigned to direct the company's 20th Anniversary film, Some of the Best. The five-reel picture was to include excerpts from prior Metro-Goldwyn-Mayer films, spanning 1924–1943, along with wrap-around pieces starring Lewis Stone. Dassin, however, became weary of his directorial duties at Metro-Goldwyn-Mayer and asked Louis B. Mayer to be released from his exclusive contract. Mayer sternly refused, even after Dassin offered to sign a promissory document that he would never work for a rival Hollywood studio. In a later interview conducted in December 1946, Dassin revealed that he was ashamed of some of the directorial duties he was forced to accept while at Metro-Goldwyn-Mayer. Dassin had hoped to return to work on the New York stage but instead took a thirteen-month voluntary hiatus from Metro-Goldwyn-Mayer, filling his time by reading books on the beach and working on local plays. On July 30, 1944, Dassin's wife Beatrice gave birth to their third child, daughter Julie.

In November 1944, actor Ralph Bellamy approached Dassin to direct The Democrats, a play he was producing on Broadway. The Democrats was written by Melvin Levy and was to co-star Frances Dee. Although the production received good publicity throughout the month of November 1944, it would appear that it never came to fruition, perhaps because Dassin was unable to receive a leave of absence from Metro-Goldwyn-Mayer.

In December 1944, Metro-Goldwyn-Mayer assigned Dassin to direct the crime-mystery film Dangerous Partners (originally announced as Paper Chase) for producer Arthur Field. Dassin took over the directorial duties from Fred Zinnemann (who was then suspended from Metro-Goldywn-Mayer for refusing to finish the picture), and had anticipated casting Susan Peters in the lead. But when Peters suffered a gun shot wound accident on January 1, 1945, Dassin pulled out of the project. Director Edward Cahn was ultimately hired for the job and recast the female lead role with Signe Hasso, successfully completing the picture.

Returning to Metro-Goldwyn-Mayer in May 1945, after thirteen months away from cameras, Dassin was assigned to direct the romantic comedy film A Letter for Evie for producer William H. Wright. The picture began shooting in early June 1945 and included Marsha Hunt, Hume Cronyn, John Carroll, Norman Lloyd and Pamela Britton. A Letter for Evie briefly changed title to All the Things You Are in late 1945, but its original title was restored in time for release in November 1945.

It was announced that once Dassin completed the shooting of A Letter for Evie, he would fly to Europe to direct a series of plays sponsored by the Actors' Laboratory Theatre. The plays were to star soldiers as part of war-time moral-building entertainment. Again, he was denied a leave of absence from Metro-Goldwyn-Mayer and in early August 1945 was assigned to direct the romantic comedy thriller (with strong film noir tones), Two Smart People (originally announced as Time for Two) for producer Ralph Wheelwright. The picture began filming in September 1945 and starred Lucille Ball, John Hodiak and Lloyd Nolan, and was released in late 1946. Following Two Smart People, Dassin would spend more than a year without successfully shooting another film.

In March 1946, Dassin and Joseph Losey co-directed Viola Brothers Shore's stage play Birthday for the Actors' Laboratory Theatre. The production, which unfolds a narrative of a girl's 18th birthday, was staged at the Phoenix Theater starring actress Karen Morley. The cast also included Howard Duff, Jocelyn Brando and Don Hanmer. In August 1946, it was reported that Dassin had been signed to direct the film noir Repeat Performance for Eagle-Lion Films, through a loan-out arrangement with Metro-Goldwyn-Mayer. The picture was to be made under the supervision of writer-producer Marion Parsonnet and set to star Franchot Tone, Sylvia Sidney, Constance Dowling and Tom Conway. Unfortunately, disagreements about the budget and script caused the whole production to fall apart and the entire cast and crew resigned. The picture was eventually made with a completely new team a year later. Dassin was finally released from Metro-Goldwyn-Mayer once his exclusive five-year contract expired in November 1946.

==== Mark Hellinger Productions and Universal-International Pictures (1946–1948) ====
As soon as the news hit that Dassin was free from contractual obligations with Metro-Goldwyn-Mayer, writer-turned-producer Mark Hellinger scooped up the director, signing him to a non-exclusive three-picture freelance contract with his film production company, Mark Hellinger Productions. The contract gave Dassin the freedom to choose his own three projects to direct at Mark Hellinger Productions, without an expiry date. The producer had an existing financing and distribution deal with Universal-International Pictures, where Dassin was set to direct one of Hollywood's biggest new stars, Burt Lancaster, in a violent prison film noir, Brute Force.

With new freedom, and support from executive producer Hellinger and associate producer Jules Buck, Dassin announced that he would shoot the picture using realism and a documentary-style. He also employed a total of thirteen actors with whom he had worked at the Actors' Laboratory Theatre, including Hume Cronyn, Howard Duff, Roman Bohnen, Whit Bissell, Art Smith, Jeff Corey, Sam Levene, Charles McGraw, Will Lee, Ray Teal, Crane Whitley, Kenneth Patterson and James O'Rear. The cast also included noted Hollywood actors Charles Bickford, Yvonne De Carlo, Ann Blyth, Ella Raines and Anita Colby. Brute Force was shot from March to April 1947 on the Universal-International Pictures lot, with reshoots taking place in early May 1947 to appease objections from the Motion Picture Association of America, shortly before a preview audience. The film, which featured a score composed and conducted by Miklós Rózsa, was released to theatres in July 1947 through Universal-International Pictures; that same month, Cosmopolitan magazine awarded Dassin with the Movie Citations of the Month Award for Best Director. Less than a year after its release, Dassin revealed that he did not like the film.

In early May 1947, Dassin was announced as the director of Hellinger's next production, The Naked City (originally announced as Homicide) Dassin planned to push the realism and documentary-style filming technique of the police story flic further by shooting it entirely on location in New York City. The production received full cooperation from New York City's Homicide Squad during its two and a half months of location shooting, from June to August 1947. 107 different locations were shot in New York City, and to distract the crowd and keep them looking natural, Dassin hired a juggler to draw their attention away from the cameras.

Dassin, Hellinger and associate producer Buck worked with several of the same cast and crew members from Brute Force on The Naked City, including actors Howard Duff, Ralph Brooks and Chuck Hamilton, assistant director Fred Frank, cinematographer William H. Daniels, art director John F. DeCuir, set decorator Russell A. Gausman and composer Miklós Rózsa. The film also starred Barry Fitzgerald, Don Taylor and Dorothy Hart. After overseeing the editing of the film in Hollywood during September and October 1947, Dassin flew back to New York City in early November 1947 to work on the pre-production of the stage play Strange Bedfellows. Unbeknownst to Dassin, Hellinger and Buck wound up re-cutting the film in his absence; the director only finding out at the film's premiere on March 3, 1948, when he saw a highly edited version of his film projected on the screen. Furthermore, Hellinger died suddenly on December 21, 1947, months before the film was premiered and released to theatres by Universal-International Pictures.

Although Dassin was unhappy about the final cut of The Naked City, the film was a huge success (one of the top movies of 1948), and it was nominated for and won several accolades, including Academy Awards for Best Film Editing and Best Cinematography, Black-and-White, an Academy Award nomination for Best Writing, Motion Picture Story; a British Academy of Film and Television Arts nomination for Best Film from any Source; and Writers Guild of America Award nominations for Best Written American Drama and The Robert Meltzer Award. In 2007, the film was deemed "culturally, historically, or aesthetically significant" by the United States National Film Preservation Board and was selected for preservation in the Library of Congress' National Film Registry.

Dassin's third and final film under his Mark Hellinger Productions contract was up in limbo following Hellinger's death. The film production unit had undergone considerable changes in the months prior to Hellinger's passing, including the addition of Humphrey Bogart as vice-president, and the signing of a six-picture financing and distribution deal with David O. Selznick's Selznick Releasing Organization. Mark Hellinger Productions owned the filming rights to several Ernest Hemingway stories, Forest Rosaire's novel East of Midnight, Arthur Cohn's screenplay Disbarred, Gordon Macker's screenplay Race Track, Philip G. Epstein's screenplay Mistakes Will Happen, and Jerry D. Lewis' screenplay Twinkle, Twinkle; in addition to three films in development: Knock on Any Door, Criss Cross and Act of Violence. Any of these properties may have been picked for Dassin to direct in 1948. The company also held contracts with actors Bogart, Burt Lancaster, Don Taylor and Howard Duff, and with cinematographer William Daniels.

Bogart, Selznick and secretary-treasurer A. Morgan Marie announced their plan to continue Mark Hellinger Productions in January 1948, by co-heading the company and honoring the late producers' namesake with the previously planned films in development. However, difficulty lay in finding a new executive producer to head the production; Jerry Wald was first approached but was unable to free himself from his Warner Bros. contract. Robert Lord was then offered the post and freed himself from his Metro-Goldwyn-Mayer contract to accept the new position. Unfortunately, Hellinger's widow, former actress Gladys Glad Hellinger, decided to liquidate the company and all of its assets in early February 1948. The story properties and actor, director and cinematographer contracts were sold to other studios via the William Morris Agency. This led Bogart, Lord and Marie to form their own film production company, Santana Productions, and secure a financing and distribution deal with Columbia Pictures with some of the properties they managed to purchase. It is unknown which, or if a studio bought out Dassin's remaining one-picture deal, though news reports hinted towards Universal-International Pictures or Metro-Goldwyn-Mayer.

In late December 1947, before Bogart, Selznick and Marie had decided upon continuing the Mark Hellinger Productions firm, Dassin took the opportunity of his non-exclusive contract to partner with stage actor and producer Luther Adler in an independent film venture. Adler had recently purchased Jack Iams' novel Prophet by Experience in September 1947 and hired Ben Hecht to adapt it and write the screenplay. The story dealt with a hermit who is taken out of seclusion by a magazine writer, and who has a unique set of experiences in the outside world. Adler, who was solely to act as producer in his new film production company, approached Dassin to direct the picture and negotiations were underway for a financing and distribution deal with Columbia Pictures. For reasons unknown, the film was never made.

While still in New York City, Dassin was hired by producers John Houseman and William R. Katzell to direct Allan Scott's play Joy to the World; a comedy about a ruthless Hollywood producer. The play began rehearsals on January 26, 1948, and opened on Broadway at the Plymouth Theatre on March 18, 1948. It would run for 124 performances, until July 3, 1948. The cast included Alfred Drake, Marsha Hunt, Morris Carnovsky, Mary Welch, Lois Hall, Peggy Maley, Myron McCormick, Clay Clement, Bert Freed, Kurt Kasznar and Theodore Newton.

==== 20th Century-Fox Film and the blacklist years (1948–1953) ====
In February 1948, Dassin was approached by theatre producer Mike Todd who was preparing to venture into the film producing business. Todd planned to make a series of low-budget, $500,000 pictures and had secured a financing and distribution deal with 20th Century-Fox Film. The first picture in Todd's new deal was Busman's Holiday, an original story based on newspaper accounts of a Bronx bus driver who took off for Florida with his family using his company's bus. Todd cast Joan Blondell as one of the leads and planned to shoot the entire picture using real locations, from New York City to Florida. Impressed by the success and filming style of The Naked City, Todd approached Dassin to direct Busman's Holiday. Although the picture was ultimately never made, Dassin had become an increasingly sought-after director.

On April 3, 1948, he returned to Hollywood to meet with executives from three different studios: Metro-Goldwyn-Mayer, 20th Century-Fox Film and Columbia Pictures, each of which had offered him a contract. Dassin connected best with Darryl F. Zanuck and opted to sign with 20th Century-Fox Film. In addition to Busman's Holiday, he was tied to two other film projects in the spring of 1948, both involving actress Paulette Goddard at 20th Century-Fox. The first was to be a film adaptation of Jean-Paul Sartre's latest novel and recently opened Broadway hit The Respectful Prostitute, for which Goddard and actor Burgess Meredith had negotiated the screen rights, hoping to play the leads. Dassin, who had promised to direct, was the only director Goddard wanted.

By June 1948, Dassin was set to direct Anna Lucasta at Columbia Pictures, a play written by Philip Yordan about a young prostitute whose family tries to use her to steal money from a potential husband. Goddard was scheduled to play the lead in the film and reportedly insisted that Dassin be hired to direct. During negotiations with 20th Century-Fox, Zanuck considered loaning Linda Darnell to Columbia Pictures as part of a package deal, but things fell through. Irving Rapper ultimately directed the film at Columbia Pictures.

During the summer of 1948, Dassin directed Magdalena on Broadway, a play produced by Edwin Lester, which ran for 88 performances from September 20, 1948, to December 4, 1948. By the time that Magdalena closed, Dassin was already back in Hollywood, having signed a contract with Zanuck at 20th Century-Fox. Dassin's inaugural project for the studio was Thieves' Highway (originally announced as Thieves' Market and Hard Bargain), starring Richard Conte, Lee J. Cobb and Valentina Cortese. In November 1949, the film won the Photoplay Award for Best Picture of the Month.

Contrary to an often-cited 1958 Time magazine article, Dassin was not blacklisted because of a single denunciation from a particular witness at a congressional hearing. Instead, his name had been mentioned a number of times, at various hearings of the United States House of Representatives House Un-American Activities Committee (HUAC), and by different witnesses, some as early as 1947. He was also linked to several Communist-front organizations.

On October 22, 1947, while Dassin was still working on The Naked City, Metro-Goldwyn-Mayer (MGM) chief supervisor and executive producer James Kevin McGuinness testified before the HUAC. He described an incident at MGM in 1941, shortly after Dassin had joined the studio, when an attempt was made to halt the production of Tennessee Johnson, a biographical picture about the life of former U.S. President Andrew Johnson. McGuinness explained that after the death of the original producer of the picture, J. Walter Ruben, he took over the production as part of his executive function. He was then presented with a petition, signed by Dassin, Ring Lardner Jr., Donald Ogden Stewart, Hy S. Kraft and Richard Collins, which was addressed to MGM executive vice-president Al Lichtman, demanding that the picture be aborted for political reasons. All five signees were known Communists. The news hit the media quickly.

In 1948 and 1949, Dassin's name was connected with at least three Communist-front organizations. First, he was an executive board member of the Actors' Laboratory Theatre. The Committee did not assert that the Actors' Lab was Communist, but rather that its board of directors was made up almost exclusively of CPUSA members or Communist sympathizers, including Dassin. Second, he had been a member of the Artists' Front to Win the War—a gathering on October 16, 1942 that the HUAC cited as subversive. Third, Dassin was a sponsor of the National Council of the Arts, Sciences and Professions' Scientific and Cultural Conference for World Peace, held from March 25–27, 1949, which the HUAC also cited as subversive.

In the late spring of 1949, Zanuck called Dassin into his office to warn him that he was on the verge of being blacklisted, but that he still had enough time to make one more movie for 20th Century-Fox. Zanuck gave Dassin a copy of Gerald Kersh's novel Night and the City and rushed him to England to make the film unhindered by the HUAC hearings. Night and the City, later released in mid-1950, was filmed entirely on location in London between July and October 1949 and starred Richard Widmark, Gene Tierney, Googie Withers, Hugh Marlowe and Mike Mazurki. Dassin was already unofficially blacklisted during the production of Night and the City and was not allowed back on the studio property to edit the film nor oversee the musical scoring.

Nevertheless, Zanuck and producer Julian Blaustein hired Dassin to direct one more 20th Century-Fox Film, Half Angel, a Technicolor comedy starring Loretta Young, and scheduled to begin shooting in mid-June 1950. However, after political pressure from Hollywood and Washington, D.C., Dassin was replaced by Richard Sale.

On April 25, 1951, film director Edward Dmytryk, one of the "Hollywood Ten" who had been blacklisted in 1947 for refusing to answer questions from the HUAC, had a change of heart and decided to cooperate with the Committee and "name names". In his revised testimony, Dmytryk revealed that the Screen Directors' Guild included seven known Communists. It was one of the first times the HUAC heard of film directors being Communists; up till then, the Committee had concentrated on left-wing writers in the Screen Writers' Guild. Dassin was named as one of the seven directors—along with Frank Tuttle, Herbert Biberman, John Berry, Bernard Vorhaus and Dmytryk himself—who had attended a Communist meeting at Berry's house for the purpose of electing themselves to the guild's board of directors. Dmytryk explained that, at the time, the Communist Party wanted to get as many people as it could on the board of directors of the Screen Writers' Guild, Screen Actors' Guild, and Screen Directors' Guild in order to eventually control the policy of those guilds, particularly in relation to forging a coalition of the various unions.

On May 24, 1951, Frank Tuttle also gave cooperative testimony to the HUAC. He said that during the 1930s and 1940s, a group of seven Communists existed within the Screen Directors' Guild. Dassin was again named as one of those seven Communists, along with Herbert Biberman, Edward Dmytryk, Bernard Vorhaus, John Berry, Michael Gordon and Tuttle himself. Tuttle explained that the CPUSA's goal was to elect its representatives to the board of directors of the Screen Directors' Guild, but that only he, Dmytryk and Biberman had succeeded in being appointed to executive positions, with the help of votes from the seven Communists in the guild.

Dassin's name was further mentioned during HUAC hearings for actor José Ferrer on May 25, 1951, and film director Michael Gordon on September 17, 1951. From that point on, Dassin was officially identified as a past or present CPUSA member.

In 1952, after Dassin had been out of work for two years, actress Bette Davis hired him to direct her in the Broadway revue Two's Company. The show ran for 90 performances, closing on March 8, 1953, due to Davis' poor health. Dassin was then offered a job in France to direct a film. He accepted the offer and left the U.S. for good, never having to appear before the HUAC.

=== Working in Europe ===
==== France ====
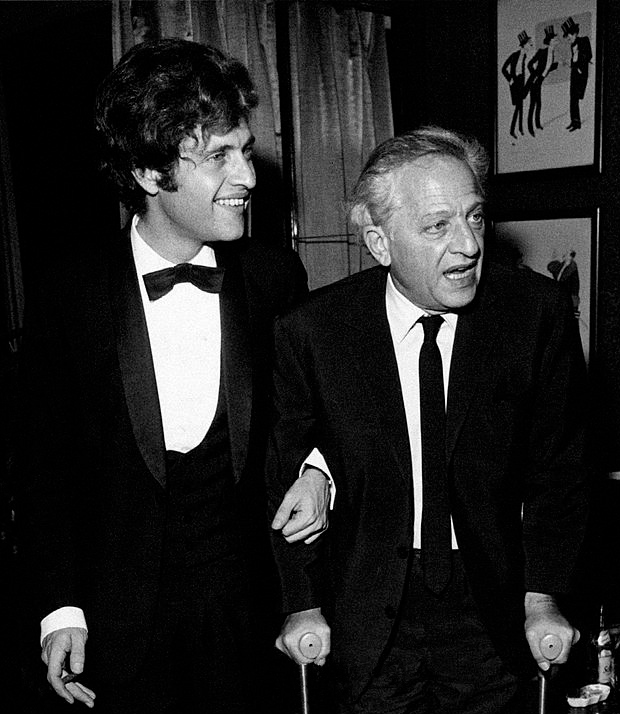
Dassin with his son Joe in 1970

In March 1953, Dassin was hired by French producer Jacques Bar to direct the comedy-crime film The Most Wanted Man, starring Fernandel and Zsa Zsa Gabor in a spoof of American gangster films. Dassin maintains that two days before the film was to begin shooting, Bar yielded to pressure from a powerful U.S. politician not to work with Dassin, receiving threats that the film, and any future Bar productions, would not be granted American distribution. In an HUAC hearing on July 12, 1956, Allied Artists Pictures Corporation manager of branch operations Roy M. Brewer stated that a worrisome Gabor phoned him from France after hearing rumors that Dassin had been identified as a Communist. The next day, Brewer received a telegram from American Federation of Labor's European representative Irving Brown, also questioning Dassin's political views. Brewer further stated that at no point did he recommend the dismissal of Dassin as director, but that he merely reported the facts to the inquirers, which was that Dassin had been identified as a Communist. The Most Wanted Man was ultimately directed by Henri Verneuil (a frequent collaborator of Fernandel), who went on to become a noted neo-noir director. Dassin later stated that he had further difficulty finding work in Europe as American film distribution companies forbade the exhibition of any film, regardless of its origin, associated with artists blacklisted in Hollywood. He later admitted that he worked as an uncredited writer on a number of scripts that were sent back to Hollywood through Zanuck.

Dassin did not work as a film director again until Rififi in 1955 (a French production), his most influential film and an early work in the "heist film" genre. He won the Best Director award for the film at the 1955 Cannes Film Festival. It inspired later heist films, such as Ocean's Eleven (1960). Another film it inspired was Dassin's own heist film Topkapi (1964), filmed in France and Istanbul, Turkey with his future second wife, Melina Mercouri and Oscar winner Peter Ustinov.

Most of Dassin's films in the decades following the blacklist are European productions. His later career in Europe and the affiliation with Greece through his second wife, combined with the Frenchified pronunciation of his surname in Europe (as "Da-SAn" instead of the common American "DASS-ine") led to a common misconception that he was a native European director.

==== Melina Mercouri ====
At the Cannes Film Festival in May 1955 he met Melina Mercouri, Greek actress and wife of Panos Harokopos. At about the same time, he discovered the literary works of Nikos Kazantzakis; these two elements created a bond with Greece. Dassin next made He Who Must Die (1957) based on Kazantzakis' Christ Recrucified and in which Mercouri appeared. She went on to star in his Never on Sunday (1960) for which she won best actress at the Cannes Film Festival. She then starred in his next three films – Phaedra (1962), Topkapi (1964) and 10:30 P.M. Summer (1966).

He divorced his first wife, Beatrice Launer, in 1962 and married Mercouri in 1966. She later starred in his Promise at Dawn (1970)—during the filming of which, Dassin broke both his legs—and later A Dream of Passion (1978).

==== Affiliation with Greece ====
Dassin was considered a major Philhellene to the point of Greek officials describing him as a "first generation Greek". Along with Mercouri, he opposed the Greek military junta.

The couple had to leave Greece after the colonels' coup in 1967. In 1970 they were accused of having financed an attempt to overthrow the dictatorship, but the charges were quickly dropped. Dassin and Mercouri lived in New York City during the 1970s; then, when the military dictatorship in Greece fell in 1974, they returned to Greece and lived out their lives there. In 1974 he and Mercouri made The Rehearsal about the junta.

While Mercouri became involved with politics and won a parliamentary seat, Dassin stayed with movie-making in Europe. In 1982 he was a member of the jury at the 34th Berlin International Film Festival.

== Personal life ==
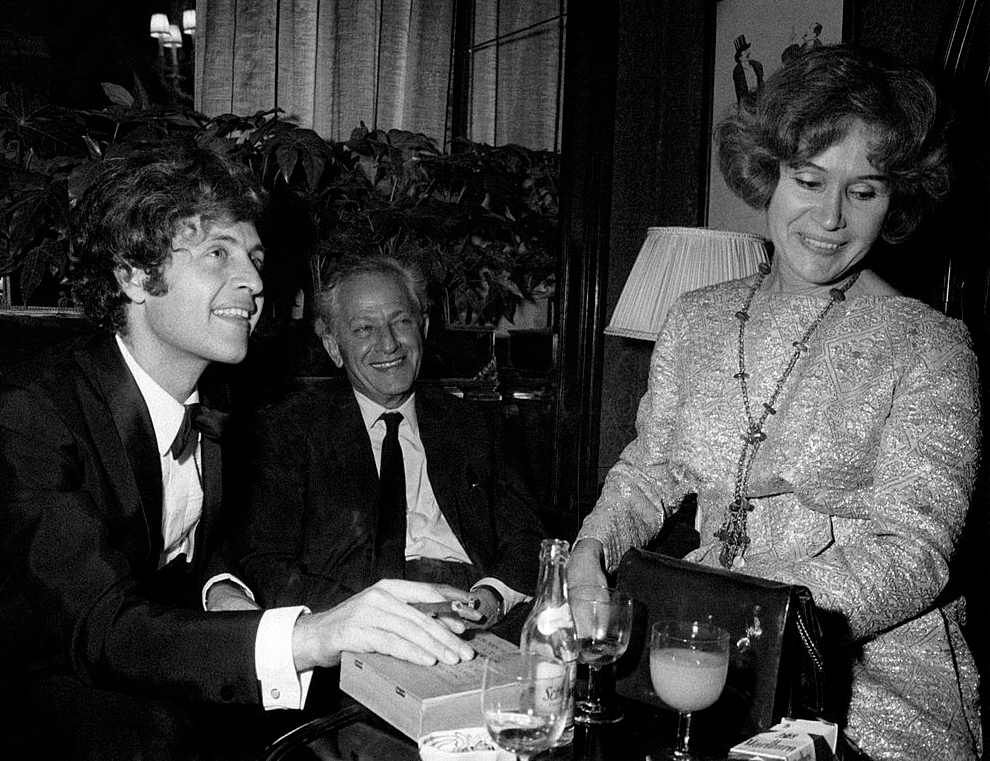
Joe and Jules Dassin with Beatrice Launer in Paris in 1970

=== Marriages ===
Dassin with his second wife Melina Mercouri (center) in 1971

Dassin married twice. Before his marriage to Melina Mercouri, he married Beatrice Launer in 1933; she was a New-York–born, Jewish–American concert violinist (aka Beatrice Launer-Dassin; 1913–1994), a graduate of the Juilliard School of Music.

=== Death ===
Dassin died from complications of influenza, at Ygeia Hospital in Marousi, Greece, on March 31, 2008, at age 96; he was survived by his two daughters and his grandchildren. Upon his death, the Greek prime minister Costas Karamanlis released a statement: "Greece mourns the loss of a rare human being, a significant artist and true friend. His passion, his relentless creative energy, his fighting spirit and his nobility will remain unforgettable."

A major supporter of the return of the Parthenon Marbles to Athens, for which he established the Melina Mercouri Institution in her memory after her death in 1994, he died a few months before the opening ceremony of the New Acropolis Museum.

== Preservation ==
The Academy Film Archive has preserved Jules Dassin's film Night and the City, including the British and pre-release versions.

In 2000, Rialto Pictures restored and released Rififi theatrically. It was subsequently released on home video through The Criterion Collection and Arrow Films.

== Filmography ==
| Year | Title | Functioned as | | | Notes |
| Year | Title | Director | Writer | Producer | Notes |
|---|---|---|---|---|---|
| 1941 | The Tell-Tale Heart | Yes | No | No | Short film |
| 1942 | Nazi Agent | Yes | No | No | |
| 1942 | The Affairs of Martha | Yes | No | No | |
| 1942 | Reunion in France | Yes | No | No | |
| 1943 | Young Ideas | Yes | No | No | |
| 1944 | The Canterville Ghost | Yes | No | No | |
| 1945 | A Letter for Evie | Yes | No | No | |
| 1946 | Two Smart People | Yes | No | No | |
| 1947 | Brute Force | Yes | No | No | |
| 1948 | The Naked City | Yes | No | No | |
| 1949 | Thieves' Highway | Yes | No | No | |
| 1950 | Night and the City | Yes | No | No | |
| 1955 | Rififi | Yes | Yes | No | |
| 1957 | He Who Must Die | Yes | Yes | No | |
| 1959 | The Law | Yes | Yes | No | |
| 1960 | Never on Sunday | Yes | Yes | Yes | |
| 1962 | Phaedra | Yes | Yes | Yes | |
| 1964 | Topkapi | Yes | No | Yes | |
| 1966 | 10:30 P.M. Summer | Yes | Yes | Yes | |
| 1968 | Survival 1967 | Yes | No | Yes | |
| 1968 | Uptight | Yes | Yes | Yes | |
| 1970 | Promise at Dawn | Yes | Yes | Yes | |
| 1974 | The Rehearsal | Yes | Yes | No | |
| 1978 | A Dream of Passion | Yes | Yes | Yes | |
| 1980 | Circle of Two | Yes | No | No | |

=== Acting roles ===
| Year | Title | Role | Notes |
|---|---|---|---|
| 1949 | Thieves' Highway | Fruit Salesman on Elevator | Uncredited |
| 1955 | Rififi | César "le Milanais" | Credited as 'Perlo Vita' |
| 1960 | Never on Sunday | Homer Thrace | |
| 1962 | Phaedra | Christo | Uncredited |
| 1964 | Topkapi | Turkish Cop | Uncredited |
| 1970 | Promise at Dawn | Ivan Mosjukine | Credited as 'Perlo Vita' |
| 1974 | The Rehearsal | Himself | |

== Broadway directing credits ==
Credits from the Internet Broadway Database:

| Year | Title | Venue | Notes |
|---|---|---|---|
| 1940 | Medicine Show | New Yorker Theatre | |
| 1948 | Joy to the World | Plymouth Theatre | |
| 1948 | Magdalena | Ziegfeld Theatre | |
| 1952-53 | Two's Company | Alvin Theatre | |
| 1962 | Isle of Children | Cort Theatre | |
| 1967-68 | Illya Darling | Mark Hellinger Theatre | Also writer |

== Awards and nominations ==
| Institution | Year | Category | Work | Result | Ref. |
|---|---|---|---|---|---|
| Academy Awards | 1961 | Best Director | Never on Sunday | Nominated | |
| Academy Awards | 1961 | Best Original Screenplay | Never on Sunday | Nominated | |
| British Academy Film Awards | 1961 | Best Film From Any Source | Never on Sunday | Nominated | |
| Cannes Film Festival | 1955 | Palme d'Or | Rififi | Nominated | |
| Cannes Film Festival | 1955 | Best Director | Rififi | Won | |
| Cannes Film Festival | 1957 | Palme d'Or | He Who Must Die | Nominated | |
| Cannes Film Festival | 1957 | OCIC Award | He Who Must Die | Won | |
| Cannes Film Festival | 1960 | Palme d'Or | Never on Sunday | Nominated | |
| Cannes Film Festival | 1978 | Palme d'Or | A Dream of Passion | Nominated | |
| Chicago International Film Festival | 1978 | Gold Hugo | A Dream of Passion | Nominated | |
| Filmfest München | 1997 | CineMerit Award | —N/a | Won | |
| French Syndicate of Cinema Critics | 1956 | Best Film | Rififi | Won | |
| Mar del Plata International Film Festival | 1959 | Best Film | The Law | Won | |
| Mar del Plata International Film Festival | 1959 | Best Film (International Competition) | The Law | Nominated | |
| Taormina Film Fest | 1962 | Golden Charybdis | Phaedra | Won | |
| Tony Awards | 1968 | Best Musical | Illya Darling | Nominated | |
| Tony Awards | 1968 | Best Direction of a Musical | Illya Darling | Nominated | |
| Valladolid International Film Festival | 1958 | Golden Don Bosco | He Who Must Die | Won | |
| Valladolid International Film Festival | 1978 | Golden Spike | A Dream of Passion | Nominated | |
