= Night and the City (novel) =

1938 novel by Gerald Kersh

- First US edition
- Author: Gerald Kersh
- Language: English
- Publisher: Michael Joseph UK; Simon and Schuster US
- Publication date: 1938
- Publication place: United Kingdom
- Pages: 274
- ISBN: 978-0-9551851-3-7
- Preceded by: Men Are So Ardent
- Followed by: They Die with Their Boots Clean

Night and the City is the third novel by British author Gerald Kersh, published in 1938. It is a crime thriller set in 1930s London but also deals with social realism themes in the aftermath of the Great Depression.

== Plot ==
The protagonist of the novel is Harry Fabian, a morally reprehensible pimp determined to become the top wrestling promoter in London. During the course of the novel Fabian is embroiled in various unscrupulous money-making ventures. All those around him are treated as a means to an end without exception. However, while his acts of pimping, blackmail, promoting professional wrestling, and deception are successful, the proceeds of crime soon slip from his hands.

Eventually his world starts to come down around him. On one side the police are closing in; on the other those he has swindled come calling. Desperate and at rock bottom Harry will try anything to ensure he comes out on top.

== Publication history ==
The novel was originally published by Michael Joseph in 1938 and was the author's first successful novel. It was later republished, as a tie-in for the 1992 film version, by Brainiac Books in 1993.

In 2007 London Books republished it as part of their London Classics imprint. The reissue features an introduction by John King, author of The Football Factory.

== Film adaptations ==
The novel was first filmed in 1950 by Jules Dassin, who had directed The Naked City two years earlier. The film was made in Britain, and the setting remains the London wrestling world, but the film departs greatly from the source novel. Later director Dassin told in an interview he hadn't read the novel. The movie starred Richard Widmark as Harry Fabian and is often thought a significant London film noir.

The film was remade in 1992 with Robert De Niro playing the lead role. It was directed and produced by Irwin Winkler, known for Guilty by Suspicion, which also starred De Niro. The setting of the film was changed to the New York boxing world, and Harry Fabian is a lawyer. The film draws predominantly from the Dassin film rather than the source novel.
