= Richard M. Powers =

American science fiction illustrator (1921–1996)

Richard M. Powers (February 24, 1921 – March 9, 1996) was an American science fiction and fantasy fiction illustrator. He was inducted into the Science Fiction Hall of Fame in 2008 and the Society of Illustrators Hall of Fame in 2016.

== Life and work ==
Born in Chicago into a Catholic family, Richard Michael Gorman Powers spent most of his early life supported by his mother and aunt; his father left the family when Powers was young. At eleven, Powers was introduced to art when his uncle gave him a sketchbook, although in later life his uncle's wife would try to prevent him from making any art. He studied Greek at Loyola University before switching to art, taking classes at Mizen Academy, Chicago Art Institute and the University of Illinois at Chicago. After enlisting to join World War II, he took more art classes at the University of Kentucky during basic training, thereafter working in the Signal Corps in New York City. He married and began a career in illustrations for magazines and publishing houses, continuing his art education at The New School in New York. Eventually, he became one of the most influential science fiction and fantasy fiction artists of all time.

He began by working in a conventional pulp-derived style, but quickly evolved a personal Surrealist idiom influenced by the cubists and surrealists, especially Picasso and Yves Tanguy. He also painted in a more purely abstract style and later worked in collage.

From the 1940s through the 1960s, he did many covers for Doubleday. During the 1950s and 1960s, he served as an unofficial art director for Ballantine Books.

He died in 1996 at age 75.

== Cultural influence ==
In 2010, Andy Partridge, former frontman of the British new wave band XTC, released a limited edition CD of music inspired by Powers' art titled POWERS.

== Selected works ==
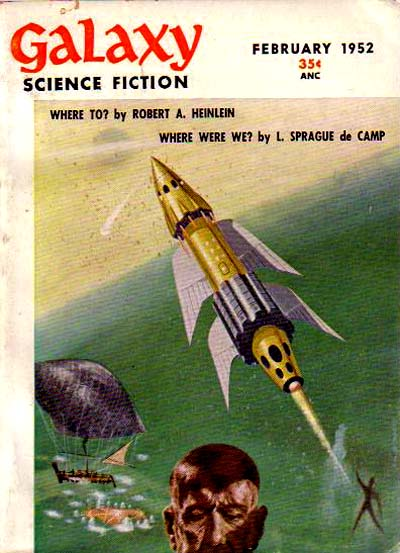
In 1952, Powers provided a Galaxy Science Fiction cover highlighting essays by de Camp and by Robert A. Heinlein

=== Collections ===
- Spacetimewarp: Paintings (1983) (Doubleday Science Fiction Book Club)

=== Illustrated books ===
Powers provided interior illustrations for a number of Easton Press special editions of classic science fiction novels, including a 1986 editions of The Gods Themselves and To Your Scattered Bodies Go.

- American Tall Tales, Adrien Stoutenburg, interior illustrations (Puffin, 1976) ISBN 978-0-14-030928-7
- The Number of the Beast (1980), interior artwork and cover illustrations, first edition

=== Album covers ===
- Symphonie Fantastique Hector Berlioz, Charles Munch, conductor, Boston Symphony Orchestra. RCA Victor, 1955
- Is It...Man or Astroman? Man or Astro-Man, Estrus Records, 1995

=== Book covers ===
The Internet Speculative Fiction Database catalogs hundreds of book covers illustrated by Powers beginning 1950 (two known). These include:

- Pebble in the Sky (Doubleday, 1950), by Isaac Asimov
- The Science Fiction Galaxy (Permabooks, 1950), ed. Groff Conklin – uncredited
- The Mountain and the Valley (Henry Holt and Company, 1952), by Ernest Buckler
- The Long Loud Silence (1952)
- Tomorrow, the Stars (1952)
- Shadow of Tomorrow, Anthology of 17 stories, edited by Frederik Pohl, Permabooks, (1953)
- Childhood's End (1953)
- More Than Human (1953)
- Expedition to Earth (1953)
- Ahead of Time (1953)
- Star Science Fiction Stories No.1 (1953)
- Earthlight (1955)
- Citizen in Space (1955)
- Who Goes There? and Other Stories (1955)
- The Human Angle (1956)
- Reach for Tomorrow (1956)
- Robots and Changelings (1957)
- Starburst (1958)
- On an Odd Note (1958)
- The Cosmic Rape (1958)
- Man of Earth (1958)
- Wolfbane (1959)
- Nine Tomorrows (collection) (1959)
- Far Rainbow (1963)
- Greybeard (1964)
- The Invincible (1964) (1973 translation)
- The Second Invasion from Mars (1968)
- The Daleth Effect (1970)
- Vermilion Sands (1971)
- The Fabulous Riverboat (1971)
- Roadside Picnic (1977)
- Firing the Cathedral (2002)

=== Short stories ===
- Three Acts With Ballet (1947)
