= 10:30 on a Summer Night =

1960 novel by Marguerite Duras

- First UK edition
- Author: Marguerite Duras
- Original title: Dix heures et demie du soir en été
- Language: French
- Publisher: Éditions Gallimard (France); Grove Press (US); John Calder (UK)
- Publication date: 1960
- Publication place: France
- English publication date: 1961
- Pages: 184

10:30 on a Summer Night (French: Dix heures et demie du soir en été) is a 1960 novel by the French writer Marguerite Duras. It was adapted into the 1966 film 10:30 P.M. Summer.

== See also ==
- 1960 in literature
- 20th-century French literature
