= Charles K. Smith =

American judge

Charles Kilgore Smith
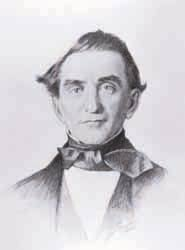
- Sketch of Smith by Carl Bohnen

1st Minnesota Territory Secretary of State
- In office June 1, 1849 – October 23, 1851
- Governor: Alexander Ramsey
- Preceded by: Position established
- Succeeded by: Alexander Wilkin

Personal details
- Born: February 15, 1799 Cincinnati, Ohio, U.S.
- Died: September 28, 1866 (aged 67) Cincinnati, Ohio, U.S.
- Other political affiliations: Whig

Military service
- Allegiance: United States of America
- Branch/service: United States Volunteers
- Rank: Assistant Quartermaster
- Battles/wars: War of 1812

Charles Kilgore Smith (February 15, 1799 – September 28, 1866) was an American politician, lawyer, and the first Minnesota Secretary of State.

== Early life and career ==
Smith was born on February 15, 1799 in Fort Washington, now Cincinnati, Ohio.^{:13} Smith's father was James Smith who served as the sheriff of Hamilton County, Ohio and was the collector of government revenue. Smith moved with his family to Hamilton County in 1805.^{:13} Smith was educated in Oxford, Ohio by Reverend James Hughes in what would later become Miami University.^{:13}

Smith worked in the field of banking and practiced law, while living in Ohio Smith served as the assistant to the clerk of the Supreme and Common Pleas Court of Butler County, Ohio.^{:13} In 1848 Smith was elected as the Associated Judge of Hamilton County.^{:13}

== Minnesota Territory ==
On March 19, 1849 Smith was appointed by President of the United States Zachary Taylor to serve as the first Secretary of State for Minnesota Territory.^{:13} Smith served as the Minnesota Territory's Secretary of State from June 1, 1849 to October 23, 1851, he was succeeded by Alexander Wilkin. Smith later founded the Minnesota Historical Society on October 20, 1849 and served as the society's first secretary.^{:13}^{:5}^{:294} In 1851 Smith served a single term as a member of the board of regents for the University of Minnesota.

== Later life ==
Smith moved back to Hamilton, Ohio to practice law until his death. Smith died on September 28, 1866.

== Personal life ==
Smith was a Freemason and a foundational figure behind of Masonic Freemasonry within the state of Minnesota.^{:9} Smith was also a charter member of the first lodge of Odd Fellows in Minnesota.^{:9}
