= Gerald Kersh =

British-American writer (1912–1968)

- Born: 26 August 1912; Teddington, England
- Died: 5 November 1968 (aged 56); Middletown, New York, US
- Occupation: Writer of fiction
- Writing career
- Genres: Mystery, horror, science fiction, fantasy, literary fiction

Gerald Kersh (26 August 1912 – 5 November 1968) was a British and later also American writer of novels and short stories.

== Biography ==
Born in 1912, Kersh began to write at the age of eight. After leaving school, he worked as, amongst other things, a cinema manager, bodyguard, debt collector, fish and chip cook, travelling salesman, French teacher and all-in wrestler whilst attempting to succeed as a writer.

Kersh's first novel, Jews Without Jehovah, an autobiographical tale of growing up poor and Jewish, was published in 1934. Kersh, however, had not sufficiently concealed the identities of some of the characters, and a member of his family sued for libel; as a result, the book was quickly withdrawn. Night and the City (1938), was more successful and has been filmed twice, with Richard Widmark in 1950 and then in 1992 with Robert De Niro in the lead role (this version transposed the setting from London to New York).

Kersh was drafted into the army during the Second World War, served in the Coldstream Guards and ended up writing for the Army Film Unit. Despite apparently deserting, Kersh ended up in France during the liberation, where he discovered that many of his French relatives had ended up in Hitler's extermination camps. After the war, Kersh continued to enjoy commercial success, mainly because of his short stories, in genres such as horror, science fiction, fantasy and the detective story. From about the mid-1950s onwards, he started to suffer from poor health and financial hardship (specifically relating to his failure to pay income tax). However, Kersh continued to publish novels and stories, some of which were commercially and critically successful. In 1958, his short story "The Secret of the Bottle", originally published in The Saturday Evening Post, received an Edgar Award from the Mystery Writers of America. The following year he became a U.S. citizen.

== Style ==
In the late 1930s, Kersh said that his novels published to that date "haven't really been fiction at all" and "contained an irreducible minimum of made-up-stuff". His novels (although not his short stories) typically depict the low life and eccentric characters of London, implying that they are written from Kersh's own experience and are semi-autobiographical. Night and the City has a plot involving professional wrestling, and in Fowler's End the protagonist is a cinema manager/chucker-out, both roles featuring in Kersh's non-writing career.

== Critical reputation ==
As Kersh's popularity did not survive his death in 1968, it is not easy to find copies of most of his works. Anthony Burgess believed Fowler's End was "one of the funniest of post-war novels, and strangely neglected". In recent years, however, he has received some critical attention, and SF author Harlan Ellison stated that Kersh was his favourite author. Writing to a fan, Ellison recommended Kersh, writing, "you will find yourself in the presence of a talent so immense and compelling, that you will understand how grateful and humble I felt merely to have been permitted to associate myself with his name as editor."

The protagonist of his short story "Whatever Happened to Corporal Cuckoo?" appears in the third chapter of The League of Extraordinary Gentlemen, Volume III: Century. There, the character identifies himself as "Colonel Cuckoo".

Anthony Boucher noted that Kersh was "incapable of writing a dull sentence."

Kersh is one of eight writers commemorated in Compass Road, a watch design by Crispin Jones and writer Iain Sinclair. Kersh was listed #9 in Time Out's "Top 30 chart of London's most erotic writers".

== Adaptations ==
Kersh's short story Umpity Poo was filmed in 1943 by Ealing Studios as Nine Men. Directed by Harry Watt, it starred Jack Lambert and Gordon Jackson.

Night and the City was loosely adapted in 1950 by Jules Dassin. The film starred Richard Widmark, Gene Tierney and Googie Withers. The film was remade in 1992 by Irwin Winkler, starring Robert De Niro and Jessica Lange.

The Horrible Dummy was adapted as The Whisper in September 1949 as an episode of Lights Out, and then re-staged in June 1950.

The Undefeated was adapted as an 1951 episode of Danger.

== Works ==
A prolific writer, he has been described as "hammering out twenty novels, twenty collections of short stories and thousands of articles in different publications, hacking pseudonymously as Piers England, Waldo Kellar, Mr Chickery, Joe Twist, George Munday, and others", some of his notable publications being:

- Jews Without Jehovah (Wishart & Co, 1934)
- Men Are So Ardent (William Heinemann, 1935)
- Night and the City (Michael Joseph, 1938), published as Dishonor (Avon, 1955) in the US
- I Got References (William Heinemann, 1939), short stories
- They Die with Their Boots Clean (William Heinemann, 1941)
- The Nine Lives of Bill Nelson (William Heinemann, 1942)
- Brain and Ten Fingers (William Heinemann, 1943)
- Selected Stories (Staples and Staples, 1943), short stories
- The Dead Look On (William Heinemann, 1943)
- Faces in a Dusty Picture (William Heinemann, 1944)
- The Horrible Dummy and Other Stories (William Heinemann, 1944), short stories
- The Weak and the Strong (William Heinemann, 1945)
- An Ape, a Dog and a Serpent: A Fantastic Novel (William Heinemann, 1945)
- Sergeant Nelson of the Guards (John C. Winston, 1945)
- Clean, Bright and Slightly Oiled (William Heinemann, 1946), autobiographical stories
- Neither Man nor Dog: Short Stories (William Heinemann, 1946), short stories
- Sad Road to the Sea (William Heinemann, 1947), short stories
- The Song of the Flea (William Heinemann, 1948)
- Clock Without Hands (William Heinemann, 1949), short stories
- The Thousand Deaths of Mr. Small (William Heinemann, 1951)
- The Brazen Bull (William Heinemann, 1952), short stories
- Prelude to a Certain Midnight (William Heinemann, 1953)
- The Great Wash (William Heinemann, 1953), issued as The Secret Masters (Ballantine Books, 1953) in the US
- The Brighton Monster and Other Stories (William Heinemann, 1953), short stories
- Guttersnipe: Little Novels (William Heinemann, 1954), short stories
- Men Without Bones (William Heinemann, 1955), short stories, issued in the US by Paperback Library, Inc, in 1962, with some different stories
- Fowler's End (William Heinemann, 1958)
- On an Odd Note (Ballantine Books, 1958), short stories
- The Ugly Face of Love and Other Stories (William Heinemann, 1960)
- The Best of Gerald Kersh (William Heinemann, 1960), edited by Simon Raven
- The Implacable Hunter (William Heinemann, 1961)
- The Terribly Wild Flowers: Nine Stories (William Heinemann, 1962), short stories
- More Than Once Upon a Time (William Heinemann, 1964), short stories
- The Hospitality of Miss Tolliver (William Heinemann, 1965), short stories
- A Long Cool Day in Hell (William Heinemann, 1966)
- The Angel and the Cuckoo (William Heinemann, 1966)
- Nightshade and Damnations (Gold Medal Books, 1968), short stories, edited by Harlan Ellison
- Brock (William Heinemann, 1969)
- Karmesin: The World's Greatest Criminal – or Most Outrageous Liar (Crippen & Landru, 2003), short stories
- The World, the Flesh, & the Devil: Fantastical Writings, Volume I (Ash-Tree Press, 2006), short stories

== Rediscovery and new editions ==
In 2013 Valancourt Books began reprinting many of Kersh's titles.

- Nightshade and Damnations (1968), with an introduction by Harlan Ellison (Reprinted in 2013)
- Fowlers End (1957), with an introduction by Michael Moorcock (Reprinted in 2013)
- Neither Man nor Dog (1946), with an introduction by Robert Webb (Reprinted in 2015)
- Clock Without Hands (1949), with an introduction by Thomas Pluck (Reprinted in 2015)
- The Great Wash (aka The Secret Masters) (1953) (Reprinted in 2015)
- On an Odd Note (1957), with an introduction by Nick Mamatas (Reprinted in 2015)

Faber & Faber reprinted a number of titles, all in 2013:

- The Horrible Dummy and Other Stories (1944)
- Sergeant Nelson of the Guards (1945)
- The Song of the Flea (1948)
- The Thousand Deaths of Mr Small (1951)
- The Best of Gerald Kersh (1960)
- The Implacable Hunter (1961)

London Books reprinted three novels:

- Night and the City (1938), Reprinted in 2007
- The Angel and the Cuckoo (1966), reprinted in 2011
- Prelude to a Certain Midnight (1953), reprinted in 2017
