= The Daleth Effect =

1970 novel by Harry Harrison

- First edition
- Author: Harry Harrison
- Cover artist: Richard M. Powers
- Language: English
- Genre: Science fiction
- Publisher: G.P. Putnam's Sons (first US edition)
- Publication date: 1970
- Publication place: United States
- Media type: Print (Hardback & Paperback)
- Pages: 217 (first edition, hardback)
- ISBN: 0-571-09429-5 (first UK edition, hardback)

The Daleth Effect, also known as In Our Hands, the Stars, is a science fiction novel written by Harry Harrison and published in 1970.

== Plot ==
Arnie Klein, an Israeli scientist, discovers the 'Daleth effect', a simple and economic way to achieve space travel. It also has the potential to be used as a weapon. Klein defects to Denmark in order to protect his discovery and develop it without it falling into the hands of the military. He fits an experimental Daleth effect unit to a submarine to create a makeshift spacecraft. When it is sent into space to rescue two Soviet cosmonauts who are stranded on the Moon, Klein is forced to reveal his secret to the world. He and his friends are then subjected to pressure from a variety of international sources, all of which seek access to his invention.

== Publication ==
The novel was originally serialised in Analog magazine in 1969–1970. It was published in book form in 1970, in the United States as The Daleth Effect and in the United Kingdom as In Our Hands, the Stars. A German translation was published as Der Daleth-Effekt in 1971, a Spanish translation as En Nuestras Manos las Estrellas in 1972, an Italian as Le stelle nelle mani in 1973, and a Chinese translation as Tai Kong Quian Ting in 1981.

== Reception ==
Reviewing the novel in The Magazine of Fantasy & Science Fiction, James Blish described it as "quite straight forward—a driving action story ... and in addition, this is a cautionary tale, like the best of Wells ... at once as exciting and as somber as John le Carré ... though not, I am afraid, as well written." As a novel about the misuse of scientific discovery, the book was listed by Stanley Schmidt as one of the "10 SF Books For Scientists".
