= The Rehearsal (1974 film) =

- Directed by: Jules Dassin
- Written by: Jules Dassin
- Produced by: Melina Mercouri
- Starring: Jules Dassin; Olympia Dukakis; Laurence Olivier
- Music by: Mikis Theodorakis
- Production companies: Melina Film; Nike Film
- Release date: January 1974
- Running time: 92 minutes
- Countries: United Kingdom; Greece
- Languages: English; Greek

The Rehearsal (Greek: Η Δοκιμή, I dokimi) is a 1974 docudrama film written and directed by Jules Dassin. The film dramatizes the November 1973 Athens Polytechnic uprising that occurred during the Greek military junta of 1967–1974.

== Plot ==
As the resistance against the junta of the colonels reaches its peak, Jules Dassin, together with Melina Mercouri in exile from Greece, continue their years-long anti-dictatorship campaign in Europe and America. In 1974, Dassin created this film essay on popular uprisings, presenting the rehearsals and shooting of a film that had as its theme the events of the Polytechnic University in 1973 as well as the torture of anti-junta activists. Dassin combines documentary, representation, Brechtian structures, prose, music and his own thoughts and experiences, creating a film full of energy, pain and hope. Mikis Theodorakis and Yannis Markopoulos perform their songs live, Melina Mercouri sings "With the Light of the Star" from Axion Esti, while personalities read poems by Giorgos Seferis and Yannis Ritsos, letters from prisoners and other documents of the time, interspersed with filmed newsreels and testimonies. The test ended with the fall of the Junta and was never released commercially, remaining an artistic and political enigma to its viewers.

== Cast ==
- Jules Dassin
- Olympia Dukakis
- Stathis Giallelis
- Lillian Hellman
- Melina Mercouri
- Arthur Miller
- Laurence Olivier
- Giorgos Panoussopoulos
- Maximilian Schell
- Mikis Theodorakis
- Michael Mullins
- Jerry Zafer
- Stephen Diacrussi

== Production ==
The Trial was filmed secretly, on a shoestring budget, and in just four weeks in a New York studio (at 512 West and 19th Street New York, NY 10011).

The characters who participate in The Trial "play" either real people, themselves, or potential people, moving in and out of roles. The work itself is actually composed of its own plot, but also of songs and musical rehearsals, of authentic documentary material, such as reels of audio testimonies, photographs, and interviews.
