= Of Mice and Men (1939 film) =

1939 film by Lewis Milestone, Nate Watt

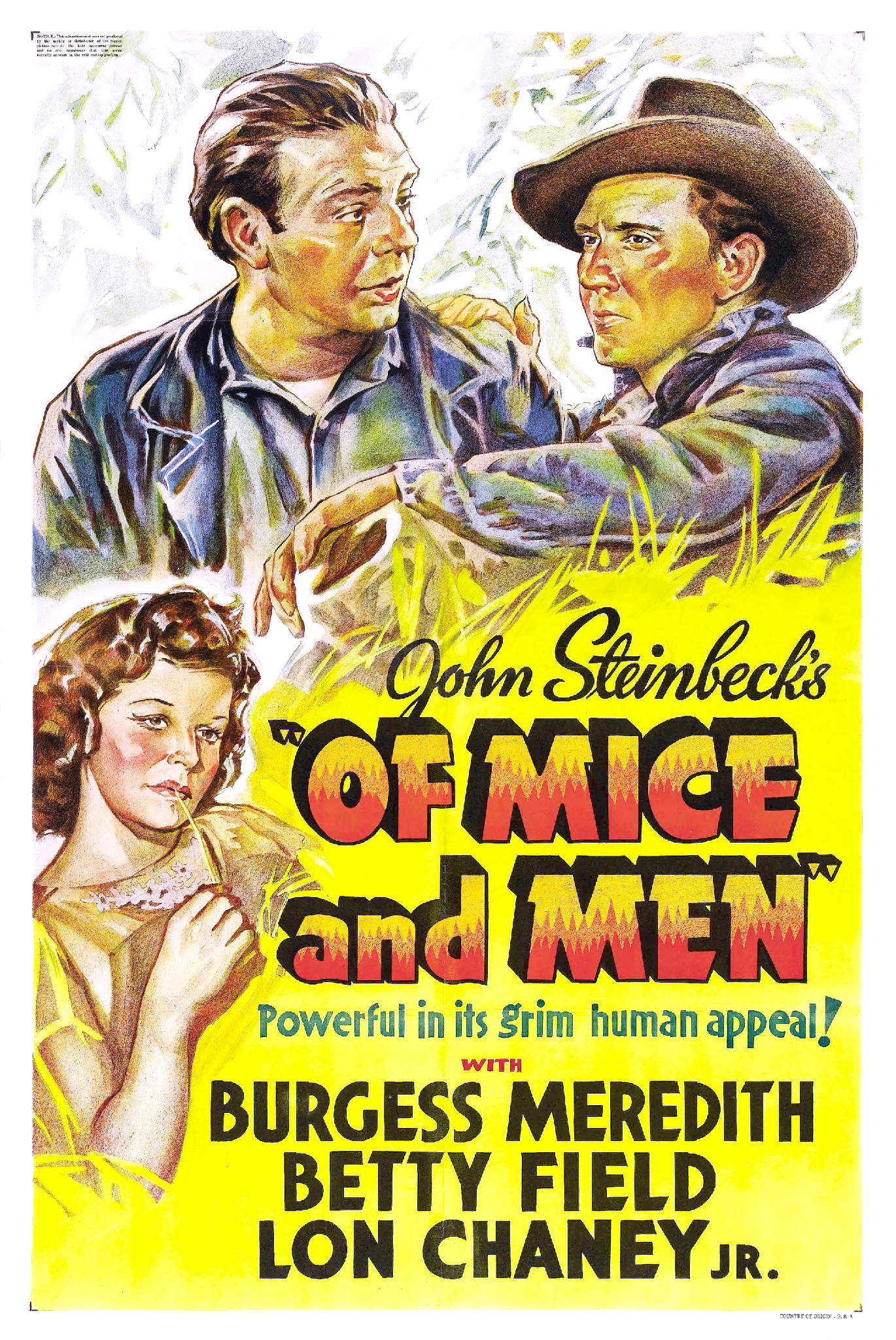
- Theatrical release poster
- Directed by: Lewis Milestone
- Screenplay by: Eugene Solow
- Based on: Of Mice and Men by John Steinbeck
- Produced by: Lewis Milestone
- Starring: Burgess Meredith; Betty Field; Lon Chaney Jr. Charles Bickford; Noah Beery Jr.
- Cinematography: Norbert Brodine
- Edited by: Bert Jordan
- Music by: Aaron Copland
- Production company: Hal Roach Studios
- Distributed by: United Artists
- Release date: December 30, 1939 (USA)
- Running time: 107 minutes
- Country: United States
- Language: English
- Budget: $336,524
- Box office: $676,292

Of Mice and Men is a 1939 American drama film based on the 1937 play of the same name, which itself was based on the novella of the same name by author John Steinbeck. The film stars Burgess Meredith, Betty Field, and Lon Chaney Jr., and features Charles Bickford, Roman Bohnen, Bob Steele, and Noah Beery Jr. The film tells the story of two men, George and his intellectually disabled partner Lennie, trying to survive during the dustbowl of the 1930s and pursuing a dream of owning their own ranch instead of always working for others. Starring in the lead roles were relative Hollywood newcomer Burgess Meredith as George and veteran actor Lon Chaney Jr. (the son of famed silent film actor Lon Chaney) as Lennie. Chaney had appeared in more than 50 films by that point in his career, but Of Mice and Men was his first major role. Betty Field's role as Mae was her breakthrough role in film.

The film, produced by the Hal Roach Studios and distributed by United Artists, was adapted by Eugene Solow and directed by Lewis Milestone. The film was a critical and commercial success and was nominated for four Academy Awards, including Best Picture (Outstanding Production). The musical score was by American composer Aaron Copland. Released on December 30, 1939, it appeared in the 1980s and 1990s in revival theater houses, video and cable, and it earned a following of fans (both audience members and film critics) who praised the movie for its interpretation of the Steinbeck novella.

== Plot ==
The film tells the story of two migrant field workers in California during the Great Depression, George Milton and the mentally-challenged Lennie Small, who hope to one day attain their shared dream of settling down on their own piece of land.

They arrive at a ranch near Soledad and meet Candy, the aged, one-handed ranch-hand, who takes them to Jackson, the ranch boss. Afterward, the pair are confronted by Curley, the hotheaded son of the ranch owner. To make matters worse, Mae, Curley's bored and lonely wife, flirts with the other ranch hands. George orders Lennie not to talk to, or even look at her, as he senses the trouble that she could bring to them.

When Candy overhears George and Lennie talking about the dream of owning their own place, he offers to join with them so they can buy the farm and the dream appears to move closer to reality. Curley appears and makes a scene in the bunkhouse as the workers mock him after he accused Slim of keeping company with his wife. Curley catches Lennie laughing, grabs him from his bunk, and starts punching him in the face. When George tells him to fight back, Lennie crushes Curley's hand. Slim gives Curley an ultimatum: if Curley tells his father, Slim will tell everyone what happened. Curley is told to say that he got his hand caught in a piece of machinery.

Despite Slim's efforts, Curley's wife discovers the truth. When she tries to be kind to Lennie, George tells her to return to the house. She refuses to do so, saying that she has the right to talk to and flirt with whomever she likes.

The next morning, Mae confronts Curley, calling him "a punk with a crippled hand!" Curley tells her that their marriage is over and that she is going to be kicked off the ranch due to her flirtatious behavior with the ranch hands. Entering the barn to pet Slim's puppies, she finds Lennie sobbing. Lennie says he accidentally killed his puppy when it tried to bite him. She explains to Lennie what she wanted to be before Curley shattered her dream. When Lennie tells her that he loves to stroke soft things, she allows him to stroke her hair. Mae starts to resist and scream when Lennie strokes her hair too hard. Lennie becomes upset and tries to silence her; he accidentally kills her by breaking her neck.

When Candy and George find her body, they tell the others and a lynch mob gathers to kill Lennie. George finds Lennie hiding in the woods and wishing to spare Lennie a painful death, shoots him in the back of the head before the mob can find him.

== Cast ==
- Burgess Meredith as George
- Lon Chaney Jr. as Lennie
- Betty Field as Curley's wife
- Charles Bickford as Slim
- Roman Bohnen as Candy
- Bob Steele as Curley
- Noah Beery Jr. as Whit
- Oscar O'Shea as Jackson
- Granville Bates as Carlson
- Leigh Whipper as Crooks
- Helen Lynd as Susie

== Reception ==
=== Critical response ===
When the film was first released, Frank S. Nugent, the film critic of The New York Times, praised the film and the acting, writing "...New York, unless we have miscalculated again, will endorse its film version, at the Roxy, as heartily as it has endorsed the film of the Joads. The pictures have little in common as narrative, but they have much in common as art; the same deft handling of their material, the same understanding of people, the same ability to focus interest sharply and reward it with honest craftsmanship and skill... No small share of that credit belongs to the men and the one young woman Hal Roach has recruited for his production. Miss Field has added stature to the role of the foreman's wife by relieving her of the play's box-office-conscious order that she behave like a hoyden."

The staff at Variety magazine also reviewed the film favorably, writing "Under skillful directorial guidance of Lewis Milestone, the picture retains all of the forceful and poignant drama of John Steinbeck's original play and novel, in presenting the strange palship and eventual tragedy of the two California ranch itinerants. In transferring the story to the screen, the scripter Eugene Solow eliminated the strong language and forthright profanity. Despite this requirement for the Hays Code, Solow and Milestone retain all of the virility of the piece in its original form."

The film received positive reviews, earning a 100% score on the review aggregator website Rotten Tomatoes based on 15 reviews. At Metacritic, which uses a weighted average, the film has a score of 89 out of 100 based on seven reviews, indicating "universal acclaim".

=== Accolades ===
It was nominated for four Academy Awards: Best Picture, Best Sound Recording (Elmer A. Raguse), Best Musical Scoring and Best Original Score. It was on the shortlist for Cinematography (Black-and-White), but was not nominated.

The film is recognized by American Film Institute in these lists:

- AFI's 100 Years of Film Scores – Nominated

== Controversy ==
The film was censored in Australia in February 1940, despite the stage version being performed in Melbourne before the ban came into force. The Sydney Morning Herald reported the censorship justification from the then Chief Commonwealth Film Censor was because he "disapproved of the theme"; the ban was only lifted in late 1954.

== See also ==
- List of films with a 100% rating on Rotten Tomatoes, a film review aggregator website
