= Who Goes There? and Other Stories =

- First edition
- Author: John W. Campbell
- Cover artist: Richard M. Powers
- Language: English
- Genre: Science fiction
- Publisher: Dell Books
- Publication date: 1955
- Media type: Print (paperback)
- Pages: 254 pp
- OCLC: 2069679

Who Goes There? and Other Stories is a 1955 collection of science fiction stories by John W. Campbell Jr., published by Dell Books in 1955. No other editions were issued.

== Contents ==
- "About John Campbell" (original essay by Theodore Sturgeon)
- "Who Goes There?" (Astounding 1938)
- "Twilight" (Astounding 1934)
- "Night" (Astounding 1935)
- "Blindness" (Astounding 1935)
- "Out of Night" (Astounding 1937)
- "Cloak of Aesir" (Astounding 1939)

All stories were originally published under the "Don A. Stuart" byline.

== Reception ==
Anthony Boucher praised the collection as "stories which so admirably foretold the innovations in modern science fiction that he was later, as an editor, to evoke from other writers."
