= Mercouris =

Mercouris, Merkouris or Mercouri is a surname. Notable people with the surname include:

- George S. Mercouris (1886–1943), Greek politician, Spyridon's son
- Melina Mercouri (1920–1994), Greek actress, singer, activist, and politician, Spyridon's granddaughter
- Stamatis Merkouris (1895–1967), Greek Army officer and politician, Spyridon's son
- Spyridon Mercouris (1856–1939), Greek politician
