= Great Greeks =

- Narrated by: Alexis Papachelas
- Country of origin: Greece
- No. of seasons: 1
- No. of episodes: 10

Original release
- Network: Skai TV
- Release: January 2009

Great Greeks (Greek: Μεγάλοι Έλληνες, Megali Ellines) is a television program, produced and broadcast by the Greek television network Skai TV, based on the BBC's equivalent show 100 Greatest Britons. The show features lists and biographies of influential figures, who came to prominence in their fields throughout the history of Greece, in order to be determined through a voting procedure who is considered the greatest Greek of all time by the audience of Greece.

== Format ==
The whole format of the show is made up of three parts. The first part consisted of a voting procedure, which began on 16 April 2008 and lasted until 7 May 2008, in order to choose the 100 predominant personalities. The second part launched with a couple of two-hour-long episodes, which presented the top 100 and revealed the 10 nominees. New voting began on 23 February 2009, with the audience assuming to vote for the greatest among the final 10 persons, while a series of ten episodes contains extensive biographies of the 10 nominees.

Each episode features a celebrity supporting a nominee. The third part, the Great Final, took place on 18 May 2009, hosted by Alexis Papahelas. It was a live debate between the ten celebrity supporters of the previous episodes and twenty-five advocates, until the end of the voting and the announcement of the Greatest Greek.

== Ten greatest Greeks ==
The final ranking of the ten greatest Greeks.

Rank	Name	Image	Notability	Nomination defended by
1	Alexander the Great		King and military commander. Conquered the largest empire ever in history (up to that point). Expanded Greek culture throughout the then-known world, from North Africa, the Middle East to India. Likewise Greece also underwent influence from the cultures he conquered. Admired as a military and political genius.	Yannis Smaragdis
2	George Papanikolaou		Physician. Invented the pap smear test, which provides early and quick detection of cervical and uterine cancer. He also improved a test for detecting stomach cancer.	Maria Houkli
3	Theodoros Kolokotronis		General. Admired for leading his troops to victory during the Greek War of Independence.	Sia Kosioni
4	Konstantinos Karamanlis		Politician. President of Greece (1980–1985) (1990–1995) and Prime Minister (1955–1958) (1958–1961) (1961–1963) (1974–1980). Admired for bringing the post-war country back to a parliamentary democratic stateform.	Stefanos Manos
5	Socrates		Philosopher. Inventor of the Socratic method. Pioneer in Western philosophy and one of the most influential thinkers in history.	Vasilis Karasmanis
6	Aristotle		Physicist, mathematician, astronomer, natural philosopher. Laid the foundations of Western science. One of the most influential thinkers in history.	Gregory Patrikareas
7	Eleftherios Venizelos		Prime Minister (1910-1915) (1917-1920) (1924) (1928-1932) (1932) (1933). Most often re-elected Prime Minister of the country. Introduced many constitutional and economic reforms which modernized Greek society.	Petros Tatsopoulos
8	Ioannis Kapodistrias		President. First president of independent Greece (1827–1831).	Thanos Veremis
9	Plato		Philosopher. Founder of Platonism. One of the most influential thinkers in history.	Pemy Zouni
10	Pericles		Politician and general who led at classical Athens at the peak of its political prominence	Tasos Telloglou

== 100 Great Greeks ==
=== By vote ===
- 1. Alexander the Great (356BC–323BC)
- 2. Georgios Papanikolaou (1883–1962)
- 3. Theodoros Kolokotronis (1770–1843)
- 4. Constantine Karamanlis (1907–1998)
- 5. Socrates (470BC?–399)
- 6. Aristotle (384?–322?)
- 7. Eleftherios Venizelos (1864–1936)
- 8. Ioannis Kapodistrias (1776–1831)
- 9. Plato (424?–347?)
- 10. Pericles (495?–429)
- 11. Mikis Theodorakis (1925–2021), composer and resistance fighter.
- 12. Constantin Carathéodory (1873–1950), mathematician.
- 13. Melina Mercouri (1920–1994), actress and activist.
- 14. Andreas Papandreou (1919–1996), Prime Minister.
- 15. Nikos Kazantzakis (1883–1957), novelist (Zorba the Greek, The Last Temptation of Christ).
- 16. Odysseas Elytis (1911–1996), poet. Nobel Prize in Literature, 1979.
- 17. Homer (8th century BC), poet (Iliad, Odyssey).
- 18. Manos Hadjidakis (1925–1994), composer.
- 19. Leonidas I of Sparta (540BC–480BC), general.
- 20. Hippocrates (460BC–370BC), physician.
- 21. Pythagoras (570BC–495BC), mathematician.
- 22. Constantine P. Cavafy (1863–1933), poet.
- 23. Maria Callas (1923–1977), opera soprano singer.
- 24. Archimedes of Syracuse (287BC?–212BC), mathematician, astronomer, engineer and inventor.
- 25. Aristotle Onassis (1906–1975), businessman
- 26. Charilaos Trikoupis (1832–1896), Prime Minister.
- 27. El Greco (1541–1614), painter (The Burial of the Count of Orgaz).
- 28. Constantine XI Palaiologos (1405–1453), Byzantine emperor.
- 29. Giorgos Seferis (1900–1971), poet. Nobel Prize for Literature, 1963.
- 30. Rigas Feraios (1757–1798), writer and politicologist.
- 31. Aris Velouchiotis (1905–1945), resistance fighter.
- 32. Ioannis Metaxas (1871–1941), Prime Minister and President.
- 33. Nikos Galis (1957–), basketball player.
- 34. Georgios Karaiskakis (1780–1827), military commander and resistance fighter.

- 35. Democritus (460BC–370BC), philosopher (atomic theory).
- 36. Gemistus Pletho (1355–1454), philosopher.
- 37. Dionysios Solomos (1798–1857), poet. Wrote the lyrics to the Greek national anthem.
- 38. Yannis Makriyannis (1797–1864), military commander and politician.
- 39. Adamantios Korais (1748–1833), political writer.
- 40. Yiannis Ritsos (1909–1990), poet and resistance fighter.
- 41. Themistocles (524BC–459BC), general
- 42. Heraclitus (535BC–475BC), philosopher.
- 43. Thucydides (460?–400?), historian (History of the Peloponnesian War)
- 44. Euclid, mathematician.
- 45. Pavlos Melas (1870–1904), general.
- 46. Christodoulos, Archbishop of Athens (1939–2008)
- 47. Athanasios Diakos (1788–1821), military commander and resistance fighter.
- 48. Theodoros Zagorakis (1971–), footballer and politician.
- 49. Dimitri Nanopoulos (1948–), physicist.
- 50. Unknown Soldier, military.
- 51. Phidias (480BC–430BC), sculptor, painter and architect (Statue of Zeus at Olympia).
- 52. Aristophanes (446BC–386BC), playwright (Lysistrata).
- 53. Kostis Palamas (1859–1943), poet.
- 54. Cosmas of Aetolia (1714–1779), religious leader.
- 55. Manolis Andronikos (1919–1992), archeologist.
- 56. Sophocles (497BC–406BC), playwright (Oedipus Rex).
- 57. Nikos Beloyannis (1915–1952), resistance fighter.
- 58. Cornelius Castoriadis (1922–1997), philosopher and economist.
- 59. George Papandreou (senior) (1888–1968), Prime Minister.
- 60. Nikolaos Margioris (1913–1993), philosopher.
- 61. Alexandros Panagoulis (1939–1976), politician, poet and resistance fighter.
- 62. Georgios Papadopoulos (1919–1999), president/dictator.
- 63. Epicurus (341BC–270BC), philosopher (Epicureanism).
- 64. Alexandros Papadiamantis (1851–1911), novelist.
- 65. Otto of Greece (1815–1867), king.
- 66. Vangelis (1943–2022) (Evangelos Odysseas Papathanassiou), composer (Chariots of Fire, Conquest of Paradise).
- 67. Solon (638–558), politician, legislator and poet. Laid the foundations of the Athenian democracy.

- 68. Cleisthenes (6th-century BC), legislator.
- 69. Aeschylus (523BC–456BC), playwright (Oresteia)
- 70. Basil II (958–1025) (the Bulgar-Slayer), Byzantine emperor.
- 71. Constantine I (272–337), emperor.
- 72. Ion Dragoumis (1878–1920), diplomat, political writer.
- 73. Costas Simitis (1936–2025), Prime Minister.
- 74. Nikolaos Plastiras (1883–1953), Prime Minister.
- 75. Dimitris Mitropoulos (1896–1960), composer and conductor.
- 76. Theodoros Angelopoulos (1935–2012) film director (O Thiassos).
- 77. Nikos Xilouris (1936–1980), composer and singer.
- 78. Stelios Kazantzidis (1931–2001), singer.
- 79. Charilaos Florakis (1914–2005), politician.
- 80. Euripides (480BC–406BC), playwright (Medea).
- 81. Karolos Koun (1908–1987), theatrical director.
- 82. Justinian I (482–565), Byzantine emperor
- 83. Lakis Lazopoulos (1956–), playwright.
- 84. Herodotus (484BC-425BC), historian and writer.
- 85. Thanasis Veggos (1926–2011), actor, comedian, theatrical director.
- 86. Helene Glykatzi-Ahrweiler (1926–2026), byzantinologist and professor. First woman to be principal of the Sorbonne.
- 87. Katina Paxinou (1900–1973), actress.
- 88. Aliki Vougiouklaki (1934–1996), actress
- 89. Markos Vamvakaris (1905–1972), singer and composer.
- 90. Grigoris Lambrakis (1912–1963), politician, resistance fighter, physician and athlete.
- 91. Vassilis Tsitsanis (1915–1984), songwriter.
- 92. Pyrros Dimas (1971–), weightlifter
- 93. Manos Loïzos (1937–1982), composer.
- 94. Manolis Glezos (1922–2020), resistance fighter and politician.
- 95. Elena Mouzala, (1953–) pianist.
- 96. Philip II of Macedon (382BC–336BC), king.
- 97. Horn, Dimitris (1921–1998), actor and theatrical director.
- 98. Laskarina Bouboulina (1771–1825), naval commander and resistance fighter.
- 99.Thales of Miletus (624BC–546BC), philosopher, mathematician and astronomer.
- 100.Praxiteles (4th-century BC), sculptor (Hermes and the Infant Dionysus)

=== Alphabetical ===
- Aeschylus
- Alexander the Great
- Andronikos, Manolis
- Angelopoulos, Theodoros
- Archimedes of Syracuse
- Aristophanes
- Aristotle
- Basil II (the Bulgar-Slayer)
- Beloyiannis, Nikos
- Bouboulina, Laskarina
- Callas, Maria
- Carathéodory, Constantin
- Castoriadis, Cornelius
- Cavafy, Constantine P.
- Christodoulos, Archbishop of Athens
- Cleisthenes
- Constantine I
- Constantine XI Palaiologos
- Cosmas of Aetolia
- Democritus
- Diakos, Athanasios
- Dimas, Pyrros
- Dragoumis, Ion
- Elytis, Odysseas
- Epicurus
- Euclid
- Euripides
- Feraios, Rigas
- Florakis, Charilaos
- Galis, Nick
- Glezos, Manolis
- Glykatzi-Ahrweiler, Helene
- Hadjidakis, Manos
- Heraclitus

- Herodotus
- Hippocrates
- Homer
- Horn, Dimitris
- Justinian I
- Kapodistrias, Ioannis
- Karaiskakis, Georgios
- Karamanlis, Constantine
- Kazantzakis, Nikos
- Kazantzidis, Stelios
- Kolokotronis, Theodoros
- Korais, Adamantios
- Koun, Karolos
- Lambrakis, Gregoris
- Lazopoulos, Lakis
- Leonidas I of Sparta
- Loïzos, Manos
- Makriyannis, Yannis
- Margioris, Nikolaos A.
- Melas, Pavlos
- Mercouri, Melina
- Metaxas, Ioannis
- Mitropoulos, Dimitris
- Mouzala, Elena
- Nanopoulos, Dimitri
- Onassis, Aristotle
- Otto of Greece
- Palamas, Kostis
- Panagoulis, Alexandros
- Papadiamantis, Alexandros
- Papadopoulos, Georgios
- Papandreou, Andreas
- Papandreou, George (senior)

- Papanikolaou, Georgios
- Paxinou, Katina
- Pericles
- Phidias
- Philip II of Macedon
- Plastiras, Nikolaos
- Plato
- Plethon, Georgius Gemistos
- Praxiteles
- Pythagoras
- Ritsos, Yiannis
- Seferis, Giorgos
- Simitis, Costas
- Socrates
- Solomos, Dionysios
- Solon
- Sophocles
- Thales of Miletus
- Themistocles
- Theodorakis, Mikis
- Theotokópoulos, Doménicos (El Greco)
- Thucydides
- Trikoupis, Charilaos
- Tsitsanis, Vassilis
- Unknown Soldier
- Vamvakaris, Markos
- Vangelis (Evangelos Odysseas Papathanassiou)
- Veggos, Thanasis
- Velouchiotis, Aris
- Venizelos, Eleftherios
- Vougiouklaki, Aliki
- Xilouris, Nikos
- Zagorakis, Theodoros

=== By era ===
Ancient Greece (27)

- Aeschylus
- Alexander the Great
- Archimedes of Syracuse
- Aristophanes
- Aristotle
- Cleisthenes of Athens
- Democritus
- Epicurus
- Euclid of Alexandria

- Euripides
- Heraclitus of Ephesus
- Herodotus of Halicarnassus
- Hippocrates of Cos
- Homer
- Leonidas I of Sparta
- Pericles
- Phidias
- Philip II of Macedon

- Plato
- Praxiteles of Athens
- Pythagoras of Samos
- Socrates
- Solon
- Sophocles
- Thales of Miletus
- Themistocles of Athens
- Thucydides

Byzantine Era (6)

- Basil II (the Bulgar-Slayer)
- Constantine I
- Constantine XI Palaiologos
- Justinian I
- Plethon, Georgius Gemistos
- Theotokópoulos, Doménicos (El Greco)

Modern Era (67)

- Andronikos, Manolis
- Angelopoulos, Theodoros
- Beloyiannis, Nikos
- Bouboulina, Laskarina
- Callas, Maria
- Carathéodory, Constantin
- Castoriadis, Cornelius
- Cavafy, Constantine P.
- Christodoulos, Archbishop of Athens
- Cosmas of Aetolia
- Diakos, Athanasios
- Dimas, Pyrros
- Dragoumis, Ion
- Elytis, Odysseas
- Feraios, Rigas
- Florakis, Charilaos
- Galis, Nick
- Glezos, Manolis
- Glykatzi-Ahrweiler, Helene
- Hadjidakis, Manos
- Horn, Dimitris
- Kapodistrias, Ioannis
- Karaiskakis, Georgios

- Karamanlis, Constantine
- Kazantzakis, Nikos
- Kazantzidis, Stelios
- Kolokotronis, Theodoros
- Korais, Adamantios
- Koun, Karolos
- Lambrakis, Gregoris
- Lazopoulos, Lakis
- Loïzos, Manos
- Makriyannis, Yannis
- Margioris, Nikolaos A.
- Melas, Pavlos
- Mercouri, Melina
- Metaxas, Ioannis
- Mitropoulos, Dimitris
- Mouzala, Elena
- Nanopoulos, Dimitri
- Onassis, Aristotle
- Otto of Greece
- Palamas, Kostis
- Panagoulis, Alexandros
- Papadiamantis, Alexandros
- Papadopoulos, Georgios

- Papandreou, Andreas
- Papandreou, George (senior)
- Papanikolaou, Georgios
- Paxinou, Katina
- Plastiras, Nikolaos
- Ritsos, Yiannis
- Seferis, Giorgos
- Simitis, Costas
- Solomos, Dionysios
- Theodorakis, Mikis
- Trikoupis, Charilaos
- Tsitsanis, Vassilis
- Unknown Soldier
- Vamvakaris, Markos
- Vangelis (Evangelos Odysseas Papathanassiou)
- Veggos, Thanasis
- Velouchiotis, Aris
- Venizelos, Eleftherios
- Vougiouklaki, Aliki
- Xilouris, Nikos
- Zagorakis, Theodoros

=== By discipline ===
Leaders (37)

- Alexander the Great
- Basil II (the Bulgar-Slayer)
- Beloyiannis, Nikos
- Bouboulina, Laskarina
- Constantine XI Palaiologos
- Diakos, Athanasios
- Cleisthenes
- Dragoumis, Ion
- Feraios, Rigas
- Florakis, Charilaos
- Glezos, Manolis
- Justinian I
- Kapodistrias, Ioannis

- Karaiskakis, Georgios
- Karamanlis, Constantine
- Kolokotronis, Theodoros
- Lambrakis, Gregoris
- Leonidas I of Sparta
- Makriyannis, Yannis
- Melas, Pavlos
- Mercouri, Melina
- Metaxas, Ioannis
- Otto of Greece
- Panagoulis, Alexandros
- Papadopoulos, Georgios

- Papandreou, Andreas
- Papandreou, George (senior)
- Pericles
- Phidias
- Philip II of Macedon
- Plastiras, Nikolaos
- Plethon, Georgius Gemistos
- Simitis, Costas
- Themistocles
- Trikoupis, Charilaos
- Velouchiotis, Aris
- Venizelos, Eleftherios

Artists (32)

- Angelopoulos, Theodoros
- Aeschylus
- Aristophanes
- Callas, Maria
- Cavafy, Constantine P.
- Elytis, Odysseas
- Euripides
- Hadjidakis, Manos
- Horn, Dimitris
- Kazantzakis, Nikos
- Kazantzidis, Stelios

- Koun, Karolos
- Lazopoulos, Lakis
- Loïzos, Manos
- Mitropoulos, Dimitris
- Mouzala, Elena
- Palamas, Kostis
- Papadiamantis, Alexandros
- Paxinou, Katina
- Praxiteles
- Ritsos, Yiannis
- Seferis, Giorgos

- Solomos, Dionysios
- Sophocles
- Theodorakis, Mikis
- Theotokópoulos, Doménicos (El Greco)
- Tsitsanis, Vassilis
- Vamvakaris, Markos
- Vangelis (Evangelos Odysseas Papathanassiou)
- Veggos, Thanasis
- Vougiouklaki, Aliki
- Xilouris, Nikos

Intellectuals (22)

- Andronikos, Manolis
- Archimedes of Syracuse
- Aristotle
- Carathéodory, Constantin
- Castoriadis, Cornelius
- Democritus
- Epicurus
- Euclid

- Glykatzi-Ahrweiler, Helene
- Heraclitus
- Herodotus
- Hippocrates
- Homer
- Korais, Adamantios
- Nanopoulos, Dimitri

- Papanikolaou, Georgios
- Plato
- Pythagoras
- Socrates
- Solon
- Thales of Miletus
- Thucydides

Religion (4)

- Christodoulos, Archbishop of Athens
- Cosmas of Aetolia
- Margioris, Nikolaos A.
- Constantine I

Sports (3)

- Galis, Nick
- Dimas, Pyrros
- Zagorakis, Theodoros

Business (1)

- Onassis, Aristotle

Other (1)

- Unknown Soldier

== See also ==
- 100 greatest Britons
- Greatest Britons spin-offs
- List of Greeks
