= António Eça de Queiroz =

Portuguese monarchist politician and agitator

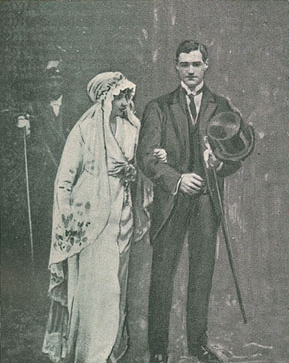
Photograph of Eça de Queiroz's wedding to Maria Cristina Guimarães Rino at Notre-Dame de Paris, 1913

António de Eça de Queiroz or Queirós CvIC OC OSE (European Portuguese pronunciation: [ɐ̃ˈtɔni.u ðɨ ˈɛsɐ ðɨ kɐjˈɾɔʃ, ɐ̃ˈtɔnju -]; 28 December 1891 – 16 May 1968) was a Portuguese monarchist politician and agitator and an official in the Estado Novo of António de Oliveira Salazar. He was married to Maria Cristina Guimarães Rino (Alcobaça, Casa do Retiro, c. 1890 – Alcobaça, 1960), without issue.

== Uprisings ==
Born in Paris, the son of celebrated realist author José Maria de Eça de Queiroz, he was educated at a polytechnic school in Portugal before entering militia officer training. He became associated with the monarchist cause from an early age and was involved in the incursions which culminated in the Royalist attack on Chaves in 1912. As a result, he spent most of the period 1910 to 1915 in exile. He would continue his involvement in such activity throughout the decade, notably in Porto between 1919 and 1920. He took part in the 28 May 1926 coup d'état and then a further uprising in Porto in February 1927 designed to push the government towards more monarchist policies.

== Fascism ==
Eça de Queiroz was a strong supporter of the Salazar regime and he sought office in the new government when it took charge in 1932. Initially however he was only employed at a low level, representing Portugal at world fairs and similar events. He was the head of Salazar's official youth movement, the Acção Escolar Vanguarda. In this capacity he represented Portugal at the 1934 Montreux Fascist conference despite Salazar officially disavowing fascism. At the time Eça de Queiroz was flirting with the National Syndicalists and it was as a representative of this group that he was announced at the conference. After the meeting he became secretary of the Comitati d'Azione per l'Universalità di Roma (CAUR), or the Action Committees for the Universality of Rome for Portugal, although Eugénio de Castro was President.

== Government activity ==
Eça de Queiroz was promoted in 1943 to the role of sub-director of the Secretariat for National Propaganda. In this role he became one of the most important figures in the Press Department of Salazar's regime. In 1951 he was appointed President of Direção de Emissora Nacional de Radiofusão, a role he held until 1959. In this position he was effectively head of broadcasting in Portugal. It was also under Eça de Queiroz that television in Portugal was first introduced. He left government after this, although he continued to write for a number of journals and newspapers, invariably in support of Salazar.
