= 1934 Montreux Fascist conference =

Political conference

The 1934 Montreux Fascist conference, also known as the Fascist International Congress, was a meeting held by deputies from a number of European Fascist organizations. The conference was held on 16–17 December 1934 in Montreux, Switzerland. The conference was organised and chaired by the Comitati d'Azione per l'Universalità di Roma (CAUR; English: Action Committees for the Universality of Rome).

== Background ==
CAUR was a network founded in 1933 by Benito Mussolini's Fascist Regime. CAUR's director was Eugenio Coselschi, and its stated goal was to act as a network for a "Fascist International". Major obstacles arose in the organisation's attempt to identify a "universal fascism" and the criteria that an organisation must fulfil in order to qualify as "fascist". Nevertheless, by April 1934 the network had identified "fascist" movements in 39 countries, including all European countries except Yugoslavia, as well as the United States, Canada, Australia, South Africa, five countries in Asia and six in Latin America. As different groups tried to obtain subsidies all manners of conflicts arose on issues such as racism, anti-Semitism, corporatism, and state structure.

== Participants ==
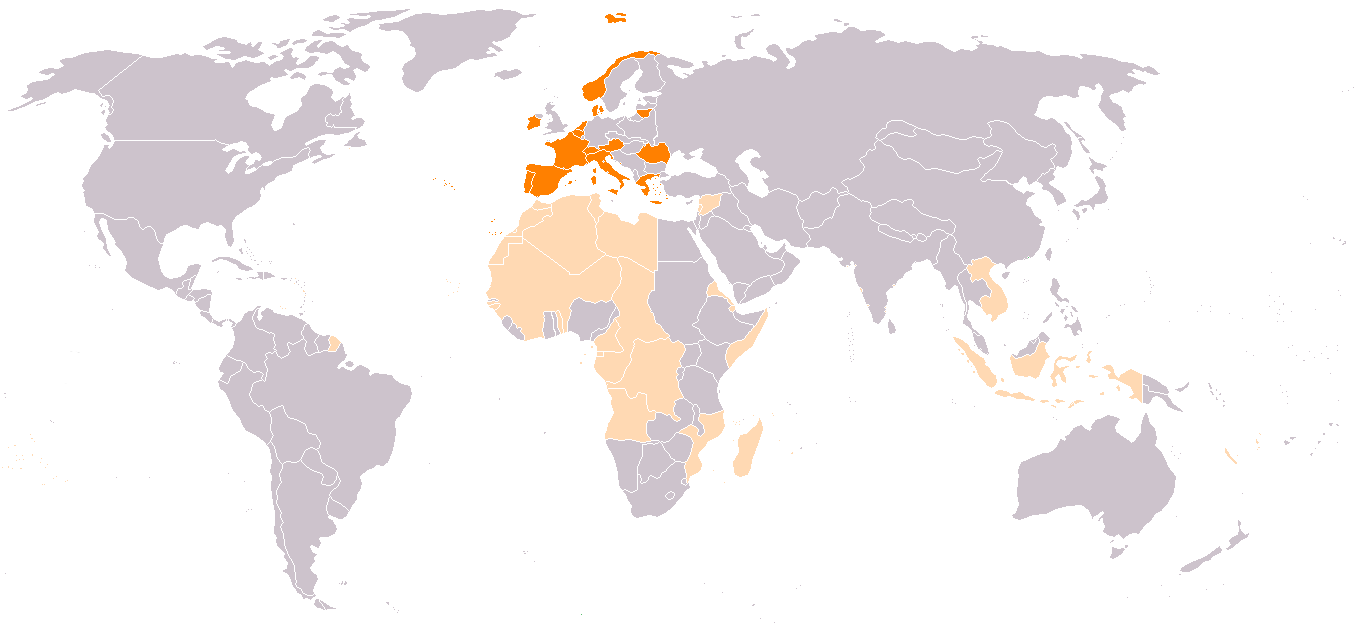
Countries of origin of the Montreux conference participants.

The first world conference of the CAUR convened at Montreux on 16 December. Participants from fascist organisations in 13 European countries attended, including Ion Moța of Romania's Iron Guard, Vidkun Quisling of Norway's Nasjonal Samling, George S. Mercouris of the Greek National Socialist Party, Ernesto Giménez Caballero of the Spanish Falange movement, Eoin O'Duffy of the Irish Blueshirts, Marcel Bucard of the French Mouvement Franciste, representatives from Lithuania's Tautininkai, the Portuguese Acção Escolar Vanguarda (English: Vanguard School Action) and União Nacional of Salazar, were headed by António Eça de Queiroz (son of the famous writer, and future head of the Emissora Nacional, the National Radio Station of Portugal), as well as delegates from Austria, Belgium, Denmark, the Netherlands and Switzerland.

Notable in their absence were any representatives from Nazi Germany. The conference in Montreux occurred only six months after the assassination of the Austrofascist Austrian chancellor Engelbert Dollfuss by Nazi agents and the resulting diplomatic crisis between Italy and Germany. Likewise, Mussolini did not allow any official representative of the Italian Fascist Party to attend the meeting, ostensibly in order to see what the conference could achieve before lending full official support. José Antonio Primo de Rivera, while allowing members of the Falange to participate, issued a public statement that the Falange as an organisation would not be represented, claiming that the Falange was "not a Fascist movement", although the following year he asserted that the Falange was the "sole Fascist movement of Spain" in a private report to the Italian embassy. Other notable absences included the Austrian Ernst Rudiger von Starhemberg and any representatives from the British Union of Fascists.

== Proceedings ==
From the outset, the conference was marred by serious conflicts between the participants. Coselschi, acting as President of the Conference, clashed with Quisling over the importance of Nazi Germany to international fascism. Moța, supported by the Danish and Swiss delegates, likewise created a rift by underlining the centrality of anti-Semitism to fascist movements, a move opposed by Coselschi and O'Duffy. The Romanian Iron Guard stressed the need for race to be an integral component of fascism.

On the matter of anti-Semitism, several compromise resolutions were adopted. These declared that "the Jewish question cannot be converted into a universal campaign of hatred against the Jews" while also stating, "Considering that in many places certain groups of Jews are installed in conquered countries, exercising in an open and occult manner an influence injurious to the material and moral interests of the country which harbors them, constituting a sort of state within a state, profiting by all benefits and refusing all duties, considering that they have furnished and are inclined to furnish, elements conducive to international revolution which would be destructive to the idea of patriotism and Christian civilisation, the Conference denounces the nefarious action of these elements and is ready to combat them."

The delegates at the conference also unanimously declared their opposition to communist movements and the Third International.

== Results ==
A second and final conference was held in Montreux in April 1935. José Antonio Primo de Rivera made a brief appearance at this conference, using the opportunity to express sympathies with the movement while stating that Spain was not ready to participate in any venture of international fascism because his movement was estrictamente nacional (strictly national).

The conference was not able to bridge the gulf between those participants who proposed achieving national integration by a corporative socio-economic policy and those who favored an appeal to race. Pretensions to "universal fascism" could not survive this rift, and the movement did not meet its goal of acting as a counterbalance to international communism.

The CAUR did not win official endorsement from the Italian Fascist Party or the Spanish Falange. It was unsuccessful either to present a commonly agreed definition as to what "fascism" was or to unite most major fascist parties into one international movement.

== See also ==
- Definitions of fascism
- Fascism
- Fascism as an international phenomenon
- International Federation of Eugenics Organizations
