= Maria Houkli =

Greek journalist and presenter (born 1961)

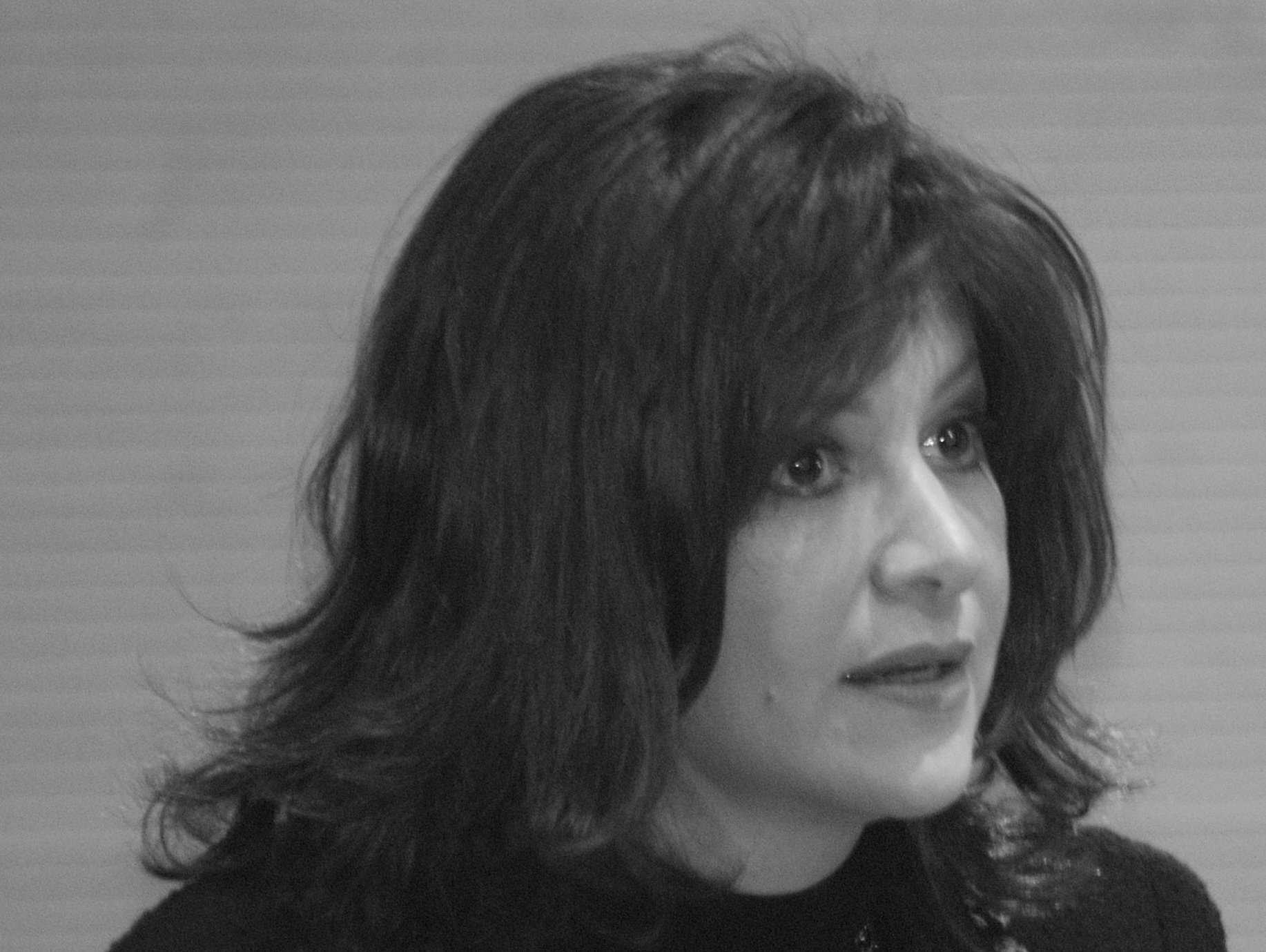
- Maria Houkli, 2007
- Born: 19 July 1961; Serres, Greece
- Education: degree in law, Aristotle University of Thessaloniki
- Occupation: journalist
- Title: "News" anchorwoman

Maria Houkli (Greek: Μαρία Χούκλη) is a Greek journalist and presenter. Houkli has served as the main anchorwoman for the main newscast on various TV stations in Greece, most recently ANT1. Prior to this, she was the editor in chief of the central news program on the New Hellenic Television of the Greek public television.

== Biography ==
Houkli was born in Serres (Σέρρες), in northern Greece on 19 July 1961. She graduated from the University of Thessaloniki, and worked as a lawyer for two years. In 1987 she began her career on ERT3, worked on private TV channels and in 2000 returned to national television. She hosted a book show titled For a Place in the Library (Για μια θέση στο ράφι), and a show about the correct use of the Greek language, Speak Greek? (Ομιλείτε Ελληνικά;). In 2007, she hosted the political debate before the September elections. She also hosted three political debates in both spring and autumn 2009. Houkli had worked as a radio announcer. Houkli was the anchorwoman in the central news on the New Hellenic Television for many years. She has received awards in Greece for her work, such as the "TV News Journalist of the Year" by Life & Style magazine, the Botsis Award and several times the award of the public for the "Best Female News Presenter" in the "Prosopa" Greek Television Awards. In 2009, she participated in the TV show Great Greeks as a celebrity supporter of Georgios Papanikolaou. It was announced in July 2010 that Houkli had signed on to present ANT1 Channel's nightly news program starting 1 September 2010. As of January 2017, she is no longer working for ANT1.

== Television career ==
- 1987–1991, ERT3
- 1991–2000, Mega Channel
- 2000–2010, NET
- 2010-2017, ANT1
