= Andrew Margioris =

Internist, endocrinologist, and professor

Andrew N. Margioris
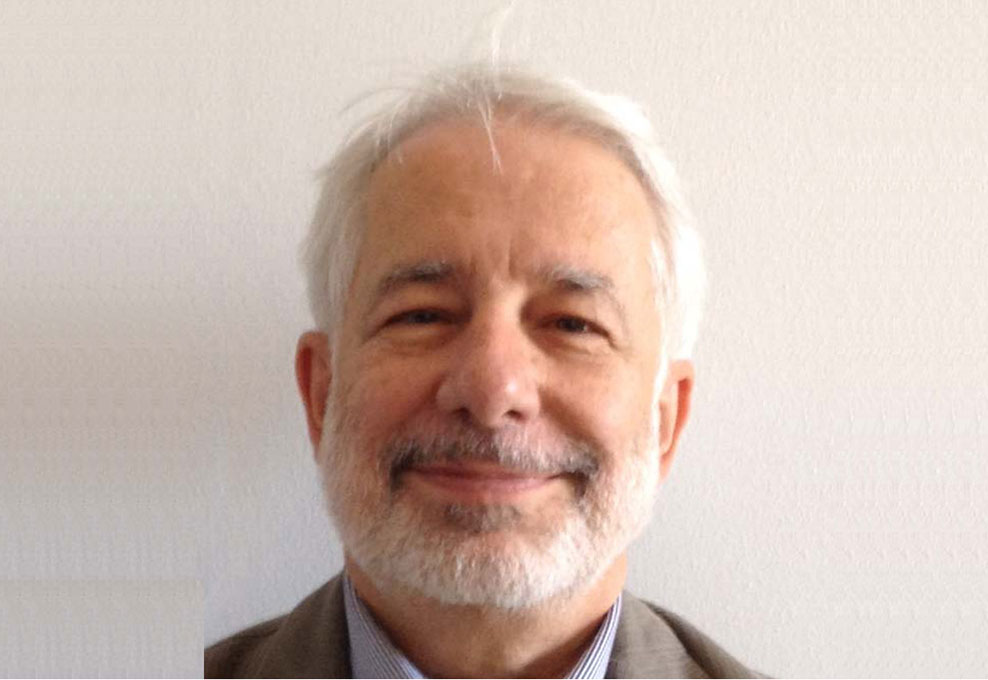
- Andrew Margioris, mid 2010s
- Born: September 17, 1947 (age 79); Alexandria, Egypt
- Education: University of Athens
- Scientific career
- Fields: Clinical medicine, Endocrinology, Biochemistry, Internal Medicine
- Workplaces: University of Athens, NIH, University of Crete

Andreas (Andrew) Margioris (Greek: Ανδρέας Μαργιωρής) is a Greek internist and endocrinologist, Professor of Clinical Chemistry Emeritus in the University of Crete.

== Biography ==
Andrew Margioris was born in Alexandria, Egypt from Greek parents. His father was the esoteric philosopher Nikolaos Margioris. Margioris attended the University of Athens Medical School; and finished in 1971. He completed his doctorate thesis at the University of Athens in 1975, where he was also teaching as an assistant at the Department of Biochemistry, School of Medicine.

Margioris was enrolled as intern in Internal Medicine in 1976 at the Brooklyn Cumberland Medical Center in Downtown Brooklyn. He continued his Internal Medicine training as junior, senior and chief resident at the Medical Center of the Downstate University of New York. Margioris started residency in Endocrinology at the Mount Sinai Medical Center, City University of New York, from 1980 till 1984. Following that, he was promoted as an instructor in Medicine at the same medical center (1985-1988).

In 1985, he was awarded a KO8, Clinical Research award (NIH). Following the untimely death of the Chief of the Department of Endocrinology at the Mount Sinai Medical Center, professor Dorothy T. Krieger, Margioris moved his research base at the NICHD, National Institutes of Health (NIH). Margioris was awarded a senior research grant from the National Research Council in 1988.

In 1989, Margioris was unanimously elected as an associate professor and head of the Department of Clinical Chemistry at the Medical School, of the University of Crete, and few years later he was promoted as a full professor. In 2010 he was elected as Chief of the Medical Service and interim Chairman of the Board at the University Hospital of Heraklion, Crete. Margioris was elected as Dean of the School of Medicine in the University of Crete, from 2011 to 2014.

Margioris retired in 2014 and he has since been elected as a professor Emeritus. He was also member of the Standing Committee of the European Medical Research Council (2009-2014) and member of the Greek Health Task Force of the Ministry of Health of Greece from 2011 to 2012. Margioris was Editor in Chief of the scientific journal Hormones, published by Springer-Nature, from 2010 to 2022. Hormones is the official journal of the Greek Endocrine Society and is on PubMed since 2002.

== Research ==
Margioris has 170 publications sited in PubMed, and 65 publications in textbooks.
