= Hormones (endocrinology journal) =

- Discipline: Endocrinology
- Language: English
- Edited by: Constantine A. Stratakis

Publication details
- History: 2002-present
- Publisher: Springer Science+Business Media on behalf of the Hellenic Endocrine Society (Greece)
- Frequency: Quarterly
- Open access: Hybrid
- Impact factor: 3.2 (2022)

Standard abbreviations
- ISO 4: Hormones

Indexing
- ISSN: 1109-3099 (print); 2520-8721 (web)
- OCLC no.: 50379387

Links
- Journal homepage; Online archive

Hormones: International Journal of Endocrinology and Metabolism is a quarterly peer-reviewed medical journal focusing on endocrinology and metabolic disorders. It was established in 2002 as the official journal of the Hellenic Endocrine Society, the Greek society of endocrinology, which published it until 2018. Since then it is published on their behalf by Springer Science+Business Media.

Since 2022 the editor-in-chief is Constantine A. Stratakis. He succeeded Andrew Margioris (University of Crete), who served for more than a decade from 2010 to 2022.

== Abstracting and indexing ==
The journal is abstracted and indexed in:

- EBSCO databases
- Embase
- Index Medicus/MEDLINE/PubMed
- Science Citation Index Expanded
- Scopus

According to the Journal Citation Reports, the journal has a 2022 impact factor of 3.2.
