= Order of the Colonial Empire =

Portuguese order

Order of the Colonial Empire Ordem do Império Colonial
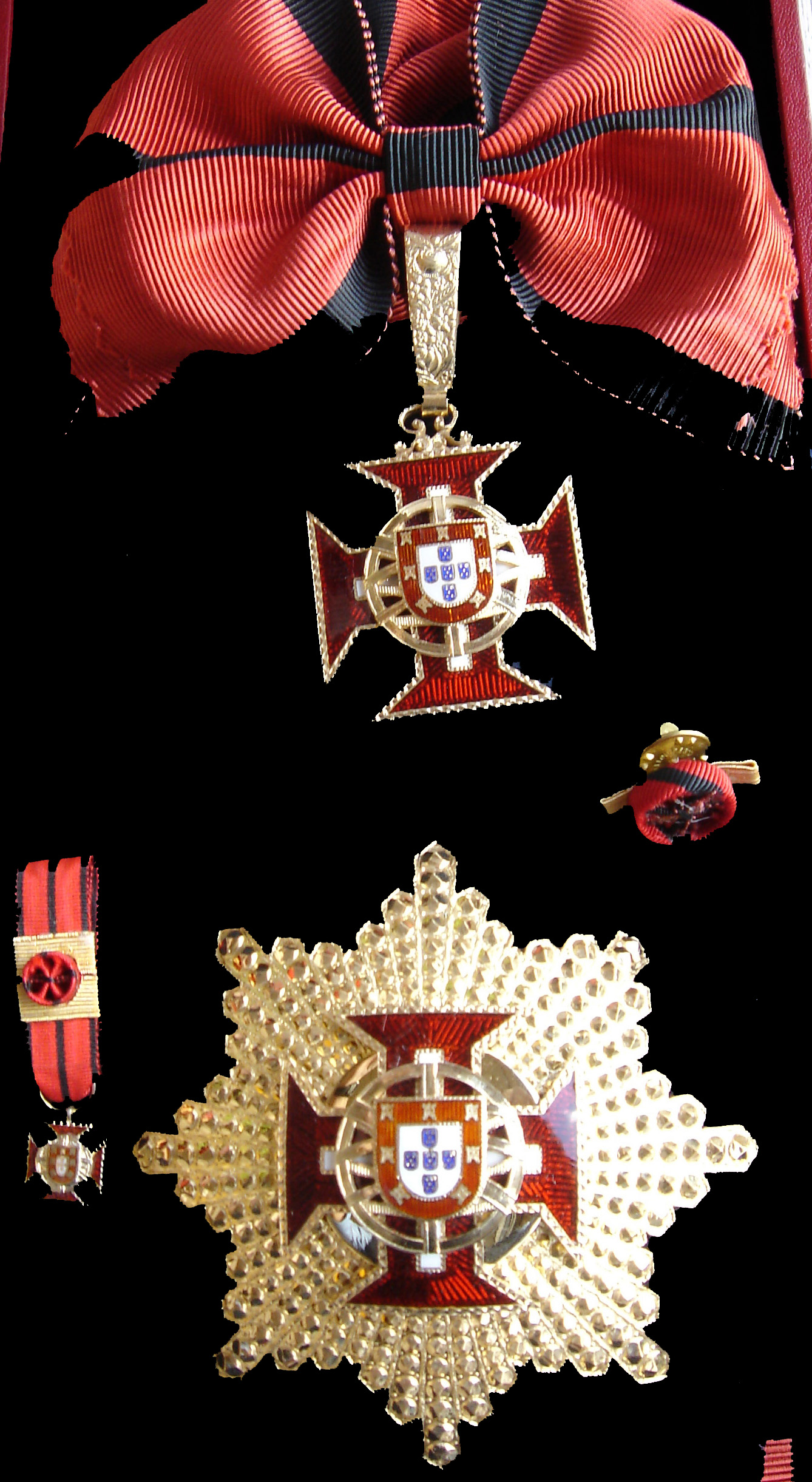
- Grand Cross insignia of the Order of the Colonial Empire

Awarded by Portuguese Republic
- Type: Colonial order of knighthood
- Established: 1932
- Eligibility: Portuguese citizens; military or civilian
- Awarded for: Service in the Portuguese colonies in Asia and Africa
- Status: Extinct
- Grades: Grand Collar; Grand Cross; Grand Officer; Commander; Officer; Knight
- Ribbon bar of the Order

The Order of the Colonial Empire (Portuguese: Ordem do Império Colonial) was a Portuguese Order (decoration), established on 13 April 1932 as a colonial order of knighthood, to reward services by soldiers and civilians in the Portuguese colonies in Asia and Africa.

The Order consisted of five grades:

- Grand Cross, which wore the badge on a sash on the right shoulder and the star on the left chest;
- Grand Officer, which wore the badge on a necklet and the star on the left chest;
- Commander, which wore the badge on a necklet and the star on the left chest;
- Officer, which wore the badge on a ribbon with rosette on the left chest;
- Knight, which wore the badge on a ribbon on the left chest.

The Commander grade was dropped sometime during the 1960s, and the Order was discontinued upon the Carnation Revolution in 1974.

Ribbon bars of the Order of the Colonial Empire
Grand Cross	Grand Officer	Commander	Officer	Knight

== Insignia ==
The badge of the Order was an enamel Order of Christ Cross, in silver for Knight and in gilt for higher grades, with the lesser Coat of arms of Portugal in enamel and gilt at the centre.

The star of the Order was an eight-pointed faceted star, in gilt for Grand Cross and Grand Officer, in silver for Commander, with the badge of the Order at the centre.

The ribbon of the Order was red with black central and edge stripes.

== Notable Recipients ==
- António de Eça de Queirós
- António de Oliveira Salazar

Grand Crosses:

- George V of the United Kingdom
- Prince George, Duke of Kent
- Mozambique Company
