= Nikolaos Margioris =

Greek esoteric philosopher (1913–1993)

- Νικόλαος Α. Μαργιωρής
- Born: 15 December 1913; Samos, Greece
- Died: 6 May 1993 (aged 79); Athens, Greece
- Citizenship: Greek
- Occupations: Author, philosopher, spiritual master and Christocentric mystic, accountant
- Children: 2
- Writing career
- Language: Greek, Arabic, Sanskrit, English, Hebrew, French

Nikolaos Margioris (Greek: Νικόλαος Μαργιωρής; 1913–1993) was a Greek esoteric philosopher, and author. He taught for many decades various metaphysical and philosophical subjects. He wrote also many practical and philosophical books.

== Biography ==
Nikolaos Margioris was born in the island of Samos on 15 December 1913. He moved to Alexandria, Egypt at a very young age. He fought in World War Two and in the Greek Civil War. He fought in World War II as a reserve officer, where he was seriously injured in El Alamein and in Rimini. For his services to the country he was honored with many medals (it is worth mentioning the Grand Cross) as well as with the veteran’s disability pension. Later, he was in Tibet and India for his training for almost one decade. He returned in Alexandria afterwards, where he started teaching to sophisticated people of the region. He left Egypt in 1958 with his family, and moved to Athens, Greece. He created many philosophical schools called Omakoio (Ομακοείο), in many different Greek cities. Margioris wrote more than 33 books. He died on the 6th of May 1993.

Margioris was listed in the 60th place of the 100 Great Greeks Greek TV show, which ranked the most important figures in Greek history. The reasoning behind was that he greatly contributed to the formation, presentation and popularization of the Greek metaphysical philosophy based on the comparative analysis of the most popular international philosophical views in this area with the corresponding Greek views.

Margioris was an esoteric writer and practitioner whose work focused on experiential approaches to spirituality. His writings drew on metaphysical concepts and influences from Eastern religious and Philosophical traditions. His work also attracted attention outside his home country.

Margioris had a son, and a daughter. His son is Andrew Margioris, a Greek endocrinologist and former Chief Editor of the Hormones Endocrine journal.

== Metaphysical philosophy ==
Nikolaos Margioris considered metaphysics as the only truth, believing that it is possible for the man to realize the truth.

In his writings he deals with issues such as arithmosofia (wisdom of the numbers), considered pseudomathematics or pseudoscience by scientists.

Books such as Dravidians, the Pre-hellenic Greeks belong to the movement of Neopythagoreanism. He describes myths as reality, like the war of the Atlanteans against Dravidians, which he places chronologically around 16,000 years BC, a time where is no documentation.

== Work ==
After 23 years of metaphysical publications (1970–1993), he wrote 33 books of clearly Esoteric subject-matter, with an incredible and unprecedented metaphysical analysis which led to increasing popularity for those who know the subject. He also wrote multiple essays on various Esoteric matters. He circulated the metaphysical journal OMAKOIO. He created a field of studies through correspondence courses under the name Esoteric Key. In this field, the students received instruction characterized by a deep, theoretical and practical Esoteric analysis, in many different courses.

Every three months, he held seminars in Shiatsu lasting for many days in which he himself not only taught Shiatsu but a lot of other Esoteric therapeutic systems among which were also his own discoveries.

Apart from teaching therapeutic systems, he himself applied therapies. Also, his students who had been instructed in these techniques applied these therapies. Meanwhile, a school of Kriya Yoga was established, bringin Kriya Yoga in Greece for the first time.

He himself taught the pure and complete Raja Yoga, as well as many other yoga systems like Mantram, Karma, Gnani-a, Bakti-a, Kundalini.

He also started teaching in Greece the mysticism of Christianity, and the Christocentral mysticism.

All his lectures and didactic activities took place in his seat, in his Spiritual Laboratory, which, from its establishment in 1976, he called the Omakoio of Athens in memory of the Omakoio which Pythagoras first established in Croton of Southern Italy.

In 1972, he established the Association The Pious Pilgrims, where he tirelessly held free lectures on various Esoteric subjects.

== Bibliography ==
- (2000) Pythagorian Arithmosophy
- (2000) Kriya Yoga
- (1999) The Eleftherian Mysteries
- (1998) Apocryphology
- (1997) In the days of the Great Cretan King Minos
- (1997) The secret of Hatha Yoga
- (1996) Dravidians, the Pre-hellenic Greeks
- (1996) Therapeutic without drugs, cheiroplastic
- (1996) Karma
- (1994) The other aspect of Erich von Däniken's Dogma
- (1994) Mystical Teachings - Part Three
- (1993) Mystical Teachings - Part Two
- (1993) Therapeutic without drugs
- (1993) Afterlife
- (1992) Apocryphology - Part Two
- (1992) White Magic
- (1991) Apocryphology - Part One
- (1991) Mystical Teachings - Part One
- (1991) Mysticism
- (1991) Pharaohs Akhenaten and Tutankhamun
- (1990) Birth and Death of Worlds
- (1990) Therapeutic without drugs
- (1990) Psychotherapeutic method without drugs
- (1990) Reincarnation
- (1989) Karma
- (1989) Three-dimensional and fourth dimensional visible and not visible world
- (1989) Three-dimensional and fourth dimensional world
- (1988) Aposymbolism of Hellenic Mythology
- (1988) The last day of Socrates
- (1987) Thiourgy teaches the eternal path of the soul
- (1987) Patapios
- (1987) Light in the Darkness
- (1985) Metaphysical Encyclopedia - Part Two
- (1985) Metaphysical Encyclopedia - Part One
- (1983) Raja Yoga
- (1980) Barefoot they dance on fire
- (1979) Dravidians, the Pre-hellenic Greeks
