= George S. Mercouris =

Greek politician (1886–1943)

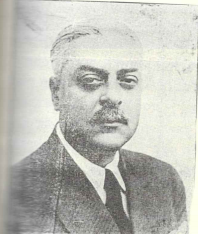

George S. Mercouris (Greek: Γεώργιος Σ. Μερκούρης; 1886 – December 1943) was a Greek politician who served as a Member of Parliament and Cabinet Minister, and later founded the Greek National Socialist Party; a minor fascist party, they were one of several small far right parties in Greece at the time. During the occupation of Greece, Mercouris was appointed by the Nazis as Governor of the National Bank of Greece.

== Biography ==
Mercouris was born in Athens into a prominent political family, the son of Spyridon Mercouris, long-serving Mayor of Athens, and the brother of Stamatis Mercouris, who would end up becoming a politician of the Left. He studied law and political science in the University of Athens, as well as in Paris. For his first political appointment he was elected as Member of Parliament in 1915 and he served until 1929.

In summer 1917 was exiled by the French and Venizelists to Corsica from he returned after the end of WWI and the antivenizelist electoral win. He was Minister for Food and Supply in the Petros Protopapadakis cabinet from May until August 1922. He then became Minister of National Economy in the Alexandros Zaimis cabinet from December 1926 until August 1927. He also served as the Greek delegate to the League of Nations in 1927.

Mercouris was re-elected to parliament, in September 1932, and made vice-president of the People's Party which he left in November after a disagreement with its leader Panagis Tsaldaris. In December he founded the Greek National Socialist Party. Mercouris represented the party at the Fascist International meeting, in Montreux on December 16/17 of 1934. He was among the more germanophilic adherents of the largely Italian fascism oriented authoritarian, corporatist, and anti-communist movement. He acted as an intermediary between Greece and Nazi Germany. Prime Minister Ioannis Rallis (during the Axis occupation) appointed him Governor of the National Bank of Greece in 1943.

== Personal life ==
He died of a heart attack during World War II. His brother Stamatis was later an MP for the United Democratic Left, and his niece was the famous actress, singer, and politician Melina Mercouri. Because of his political views, they refused to attend his funeral.

== Sources ==
- Biographical Dictionary of the Extreme Right Since 1890 edited by Philip Rees, 1991, ISBN 0-13-089301-3.
- Who Were the Fascists?: Social Roots of European Fascism edited by Stein Ugelvik Larsen, Jan P. Myklebust, and Bernt Hagtvet, 1980, ISBN 82-00-05331-8.
- I Was Born Greek by Melina Mercouri, 1971, ISBN 0-340-10611-5.
