= Melina Mercouri =

Greek actress, singer, activist, and politician (1920–1994)

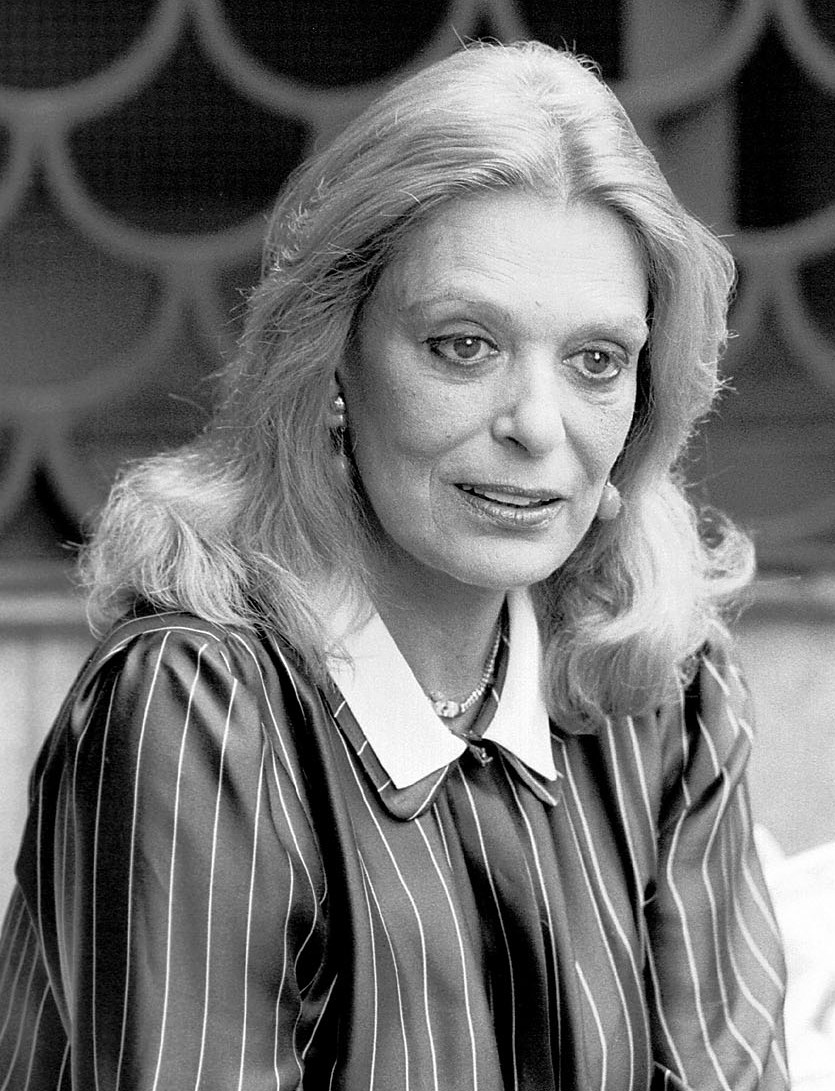
- Mercouri in 1982

Minister for Culture
- In office 13 October 1993 – 6 March 1994
- Prime Minister: Andreas Papandreou
- Preceded by: Dora Bakoyanni
- Succeeded by: Thanos Mikroutsikos
- In office 21 October 1981 – 2 July 1989
- Prime Minister: Andreas Papandreou
- Preceded by: Andreas Andrianopoulos
- Succeeded by: Anna Psarouda-Benaki

Member of the Hellenic Parliament for Piraeus B
- In office 20 November 1977 – 7 May 1985

Member of the Hellenic Parliament for National list
- In office 17 June 1985 – 6 March 1994

Personal details
- Born: Maria Amalia Mercouri; 18 October 1920 Kolonaki, Athens, Kingdom of Greece
- Died: 6 March 1994 (aged 73) New York City, U.S.
- Resting place: First Cemetery of Athens
- Citizenship: Greece (until 1967 and from 1974)
- Party: Panhellenic Socialist Movement (PASOK)
- Spouses: Panos Harokopos (m. 1941; div. 1962); Jules Dassin (m. 1966)
- Parents: Stamatis Mercouris; Irene Lappa
- Relatives: George S. Mercouris (uncle); Spyridon Mercouris (grandfather); Joe Dassin (stepson)
- Education: National Theatre of Greece Drama School
- Occupation: Actress; singer; politician

Maria Amalia "Melina" Mercouri (Greek: Μαρία Αμαλία "Μελίνα" Μερκούρη; 18 October 1920 – 6 March 1994) was a Greek actress, singer, activist, and politician. She came from a prominent political family for multiple generations. She received an Academy Award nomination and won a French Cannes Film Festival Best Actress Award for her performance in the film Never on Sunday (1960) and an Italian David di Donatello for Topkapi (1964). Mercouri was also nominated for one Tony Award, three Golden Globe Awards, two BAFTA Awards, and one New York Film Critics Circle Award during the course of her acting career. In 1987, she was awarded a special accolade in the first edition of the Europe Theatre Prize.

Mercouri was a member of the Hellenic Parliament, elected as a representative of PASOK. In October 1981, she became the first female Minister of Culture and Sports. She has the longest tenure of any of Greece's Ministers of Culture, having served from 1981 to 1989, and then from 1993 until her death in 1994, during PASOK governments. Mercouri's political activism included her long campaign for the return of the Parthenon Marbles. One of her greatest achievements was the establishment of the European Capitals of Culture, with Athens chosen as the first capital in 1985.

== Early life and education ==
Maria Amalia Mercouri was born on 18 October 1920, in the Kolonaki neighbourhood of Athens. The Mercouri family were an Arvanite family from Argolida, who settled in Athens. Its members had fought in the Greek war of independence of 1821. Melina's grandfather, Spyridon Mercouris, had served for many years as mayor of Athens. Her father, Stamatis Mercouris, was an officer of the cavalry and served as a member of parliament and minister (People's Party, National Radical Party), and for many years, he participated in the administration of the Panathinaikos team. During the Axis occupation of Greece, Stamatis Mercouris founded the resistance organisation Rizospastiki Organosis (Radical Organisation) in January 1942.

Melina's mother, Irene Lappa, was the sister of Admiral Pyrros Lappas, who served as Chief of the Naval Staff, Secretary General of the Olympic Games Committee, and Chief of the Military House of King Paul. Melina's uncle, George S. Mercouris, held extreme right-wing political views. He was a founder of the Greek National Socialist Party and a governor of the National Bank during the occupation. This so angered the Mercouri family that they refused to attend his funeral in 1943.

In September 1938, she was accepted at the Drama School of the National Theatre with fellow students including Despo Diamantidou and Alexis Damianos.

== World War II ==
During the occupation, Melina became romantically involved with businessman Phidias Yadikiaroglou, while still married to Harokopos, although their marital relationship had effectively ended.

Mercouri was later criticized for living in comfort in a 400-square-meter apartment at Avenue Akademias 4, much of which had been commandeered by the Germans at a time when the Greek people were starving and for not contributing to the national resistance. Melina had commented on this period of her life, both in her autobiography, "I was born a Greek," and on television as Minister of Culture, taking responsibility for her nonparticipation in the Resistance during the Occupation.

Lycurgos Kallergis, a member of EAM and the Left during the Occupation, said: "Although I was and am a left-winger, the issue of the opulence in which she lived did not bother me. After all, Melina was hosting people, feeding people, helping friends.[...] " The great Greek writer Alkis Zei also agrees with this view, stating that during the period of occupation, Melina was hiding left-wingers and giving them money.

At the same time, her brother, Spyros Mercouris, had joined the Resistance as a member of the EPON. Many times, according to testimonies, Melina would secretly take Yadikiaroglou's money and give it to her brother for the Resistance, hiding both him and his comrades in the organization while helping her impoverished colleagues. During the occupation, despite her then-husband's objections, Melina's house, on her own instruction, was known to be always open and welcoming to many people in need, providing them with food and shelter.

Despite occasional criticisms, her dislike of the Nazi occupiers is demonstrated by an incident during the occupation where she disobeyed SS men while at a bar, despite the threat of being shot.

A number of people with strong resistance activities during the occupation became close friends of hers, including writer Iakovos Kambanellis (who wrote Stella with the Red Gloves especially for her), actress Olympia Papadouka, actor Manos Katrakis, actor and secretary of the EAM theatre Dimitris Myrat, writer Alkis Zei, director Nikos Koundouros, and Manolis Glezos.

During the civil war, although Melina Mercouri lived in Kolonaki, which was controlled by the British, she visited her friends and colleagues who had been arrested for their political beliefs. Years later, Aleka Paizi gratefully recounted Melina's visit to the prison where she was being held, to support her.

== Performing career ==
=== Early years ===
After her graduation, Mercouri joined the National Theatre of Greece and played the role of Electra in Eugene O'Neill's play Mourning Becomes Electra in 1945. In 1949, she had her first major success in the theatre playing Blanche DuBois in A Streetcar Named Desire, staged by Karolos Koun's Art Theatre.

After 1950, she moved to Paris, where she appeared in boulevard plays by Jacques Deval and Marcel Achard, and met French playwrights and novelists such as Jean Cocteau, Jean-Paul Sartre, Colette, and Françoise Sagan. In 1953, Mercouri received the Marika Kotopouli Prize. Mercouri returned to Greece in 1955. At the Kotopouli-Rex Theatre, she starred in Macbeth by William Shakespeare and L'Alouette by Jean Anouilh.

=== International success ===
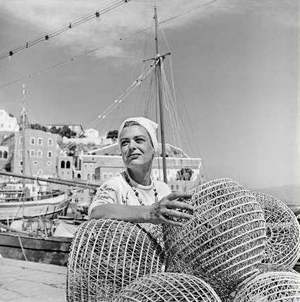
Mercouri in 1962's Phaedra

Mercouri's first film was the Greek language film Stella (1955), directed by Michael Cacoyannis, later known for Zorba the Greek (1964). The motion picture received special praise at the 1956 Cannes Film Festival, where she met expatriate American film director Jules Dassin, with whom she would share not only her career, but also her life. Their first professional pairing was He Who Must Die (1957). Other films by Dassin and featuring Mercouri followed, such as The Law (1959).

She garnered international acclaim when she starred in Never on Sunday (1960), of which Dassin was the director and co-star. For this film, she earned the Best Actress Award at the 1960 Cannes Film Festival and was nominated for the Academy Award for Best Actress and the BAFTA Award for Best Actress in a Leading Role.

After this, she starred in Phaedra (1962), for which she was nominated again for Best Actress in the BAFTA and Golden Globe nominations. Her role in Topkapi (1964) garnered her a nomination for the Golden Globe Award for Best Actress in Motion Picture Musical or Comedy. The directors with whom Mercouri worked included Joseph Losey, Vittorio De Sica, Ronald Neame, Carl Foreman, and Norman Jewison. She starred in the Spanish language film The Uninhibited (1965) by Juan Antonio Bardem.

On June 11, 1967, Mercouri appeared on one of the final episodes of What's My Line (the venerable panel show would leave the air that fall, after 18 years).

Mercouri continued her stage career in the Greek production of Tennessee Williams's Sweet Bird of Youth (1960), under the direction of Karolos Koun. In 1967, she played the leading role in Illya Darling (from 11 April 1967 to 13 January 1968) on Broadway, for which she was nominated for the Tony Award for Best Performance by a Leading Actress in a Musical. Mercouri's performance in Promise at Dawn (1970) earned her another Golden Globe Award nomination.

Mercouri concentrated on her stage career in the following years, playing in the Greek productions of The Threepenny Opera, and for a second time, Sweet Bird of Youth, in addition to the ancient Greek tragedies Medea and Oresteia. She retired from film acting after making her last film, A Dream of Passion (1978), directed by her husband, Jules Dassin.

In 1987, the jury of the Europe Theatre Prize awarded her a special prize of the presidency with the motivation: "For the devotion and the commitment of an artist who joins her own theatrical experience with the political belief and the ideal of European culture."

Mercouri's last performance on stage was in the opera Pylades at the Athens Concert Hall in 1992, portraying Clytemnestra.

=== Singer ===
One of her first songs was by Manos Hadjidakis and Nikos Gatsos. It was titled "Hartino to Fengaraki" ("Papermoon") and was a part of the Greek production of A Streetcar Named Desire in 1949, in which she starred as Blanche DuBois. The first official recording of this song was made by Nana Mouskouri in 1960, although the company Sirius, created by Hadjidakis, issued a recording Mercouri made for French television during the 1960s in 2004.

Her recordings of "Athenes, ma Ville", a collaboration with Vangelis, and "Melinaki", were popular in France. Her recording of "Feggari mou, Agapi mou" (Phaedra) was later covered by Marinella in 1965.

== Political career ==
=== Activism against the Greek junta ===
At the time of the coup d'état in Greece by a group of colonels of the Greek military on 21 April 1967, she was in the United States, playing in Illya Darling on Broadway. She immediately joined the struggle against the Greek military junta and started an international campaign, travelling worldwide to inform the public and contribute to the isolation and fall of the colonels. As a result, the dictatorial regime revoked her Greek citizenship and confiscated her property.

When her Greek citizenship was revoked, she said: "I was born a Greek and I will die a Greek. Those bastards were born fascists and they will die fascists". In London, she worked with Amalia Fleming and Helen Vlachos of Kathimerini against the junta of the colonels.

=== Involvement in politics ===
After the fall of the junta and during the metapolitefsi in 1974, Mercouri settled in Greece and was one of the founding members of the Panhellenic Socialist Movement (PASOK), a centre-left political party. She was a member of the party's Central Committee and a rapporteur for the Culture Section, while being involved in the women's movement, as well.

In the Greek legislative elections of 1974, she was a PASOK candidate in the Piraeus B constituency, but the 7,500 votes were not enough to secure a seat for her in the Hellenic Parliament (she needed 33 more votes), but she was successful in the elections of 1977, after conducting a grass-roots campaign.

=== Minister for Culture (1981–1989) ===
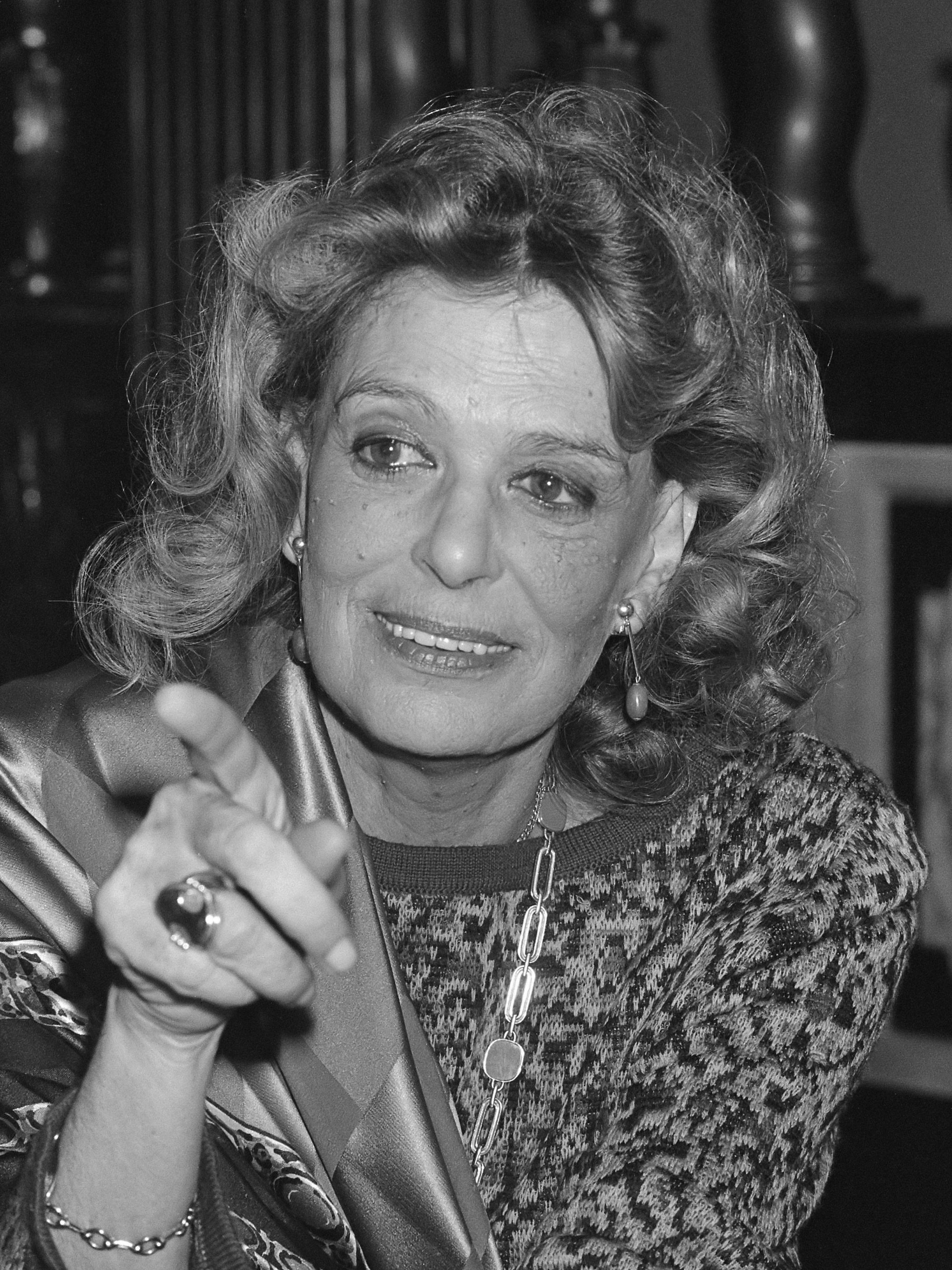
Mercouri in 1985

When PASOK won the elections of 1981, Mercouri was appointed Minister for Culture of Greece, being the first woman in the post. She would serve in that position for two terms until 1989, when PASOK lost the elections and New Democracy formed a cabinet.

As Minister for Culture, Mercouri took advantage of her earlier career to promote Greece to other European leaders. She strongly advocated the return to Athens of the Parthenon Marbles that were removed from Parthenon and other buildings on the Acropolis of Athens by Thomas Bruce, 7th Earl of Elgin, and are now part of the British Museum collection in London.

In 1983, she engaged in a televised debate with the then-director of the British Museum, David M. Wilson, which was interpreted by many as a public relations disaster for the British Museum. In anticipation of the return of the marbles, she held an international competition for the construction of the New Acropolis Museum, designated to display them and finally established in 2009.

One of her greatest achievements was the establishment of the institution of the European Capital of Culture within the framework of cultural policy of the European Union. She had conceived and proposed the idea in 1983, with Athens being the first title-holder in 1985. She was also a devoted supporter of the Athens bid to host the Centennial Olympic Games.

In 1983, during the first Greek presidency of the Council of the European Union, Mercouri invited the Ministers for Culture of the other nine member states of the European Union at Zappeion, to increase the people's cultural awareness, since no reference was made to cultural questions in the Treaty of Rome, which led to the establishment of formal sessions between the Ministers of Culture of the European Union.

During the second presidency of Greece in 1988, she supported the cooperation between Eastern Europe and the European Union, which was finally implemented one year later with the celebration of the Month of Culture in Eastern countries.

Mercouri commissioned a study to integrate all the archaeological sites of Athens to create a traffic-free archaeological park to promote the Greek culture. She introduced free access to museums and archaeological sites for Greek citizens, organized a series of exhibitions of Greek cultural heritage and modern Greek art worldwide, supported the restoration of buildings of special architectural interest and the completion of the Athens Concert Hall, and backed the establishment of the Museum of Byzantine culture in Thessaloniki.

In June 1986, Melina Mercouri spoke at the Oxford Union, the debating society, on the matter of the Parthenon Marbles and whether they should remain in London or be returned to Greece. She argued passionately for the Marbles' reunification. She said the Marbles are more to Greece than just works of art: they are an essential element of Greek heritage, which ties directly into cultural identity. She said: "You must understand what the Parthenon Marbles mean to us. They are our pride. They are our sacrifices. They are our noblest symbol of excellence. They are a tribute to the democratic philosophy. They are our aspirations and our name. They are the essence of Greekness."

=== Minister for Culture (1993–1994) ===
In the legislative elections of November 1989, PASOK lost and Mercouri was elected a member of the Hellenic Parliament and remained a member of the party's Executive Bureau. In 1990, she was a candidate for Mayor of Athens, but she was defeated by Antonis Tritsis.

After PASOK's win in the election of 1993, she was reappointed to the Ministry for Culture. Her major goals in this brief second term in office were to create a cultural park in the Aegean Sea to protect and enhance the environment and civilization of the Aegean Islands, and to link culture with education at all education levels, introducing a system of post-training of teachers.

== Personal life ==
In the winter of 1939, she married an older wealthy landowner, Panagis Harokopos. She travelled as Melina Harokopou or Melina Charocopou.

In the late 1940s, Melina met Pyrros Spyromilios, whom she was with for seven years. He was alleged to be the great love of her life before she met Jules Dassin. Pyrros Spyromilios was a naval officer and a hero of the Albanian front. He died in March 1961 due to heart hypertrophy, which devastated Melina, though five years had passed since their separation.

Mercouri with her second husband Jules Dassin (center) in 1971

In 1955, she starred in her first feature film, Stella. The film competed at the Cannes Film Festival, and during its screening, she met and fell in love with Jules Dassin. She was married to him until the end of her life.

== Death ==
Mercouri died of lung cancer, on 6 March 1994, at Memorial Sloan Kettering Cancer Center, at age 73.

Her sole immediate survivor was her husband, Jules Dassin. The couple had no children. She received a state funeral with Prime Minister's honours. She was buried at the First Cemetery of Athens four days later.

The Melina Mercouri Foundation was founded by her widower. After her death, UNESCO established the Melina Mercouri International Prize for the Safeguarding and Management of Cultural Landscapes (UNESCO-Greece), which rewards outstanding examples of action to safeguard and enhance the world's major cultural landscapes.

== Works ==
=== Filmography ===
Year	Title	Role	Notes
1955	Stella	Stella	
1957	He Who Must Die	Katerina	
1958	The Gypsy and the Gentleman	Belle	British film for Joseph Losey
1959	The Law	Donna Lucrezia	
1960	Never on Sunday	Ilya	Won—Cannes Film Festival Best Actress Award; Nominated—Academy Award for Best Actress; Nominated—BAFTA Award for Best Foreign Actress; Nominated—New York Film Critics Circle Award for Best Actress
1961	Long Live Henry IV... Long Live Love	Marie de Médicis	
1961	The Last Judgment	Foreign lady	
1962	Phaedra	Phaedra	Nominated—BAFTA Award for Best Foreign Actress; Nominated—Golden Globe Award for Best Actress in a Motion Picture – Drama
1963	The Victors	Magda	
1963	Canzoni nel mondo	Herself	
1964	Topkapi	Elizabeth Lipp	Won—Golden Plate David di Donatello Award; Nominated—Golden Globe Award for Best Actress – Motion Picture Comedy or Musical
1965	The Uninhibited	Jenny	
1966	A Man Could Get Killed	Aurora	
1966	10:30 P.M. Summer	Maria	
1969	Gaily, Gaily	Lil	
1970	Promise at Dawn	Nina Kacew	Nominated—Golden Globe Award for Best Actress in a Motion Picture – Drama
1974	The Rehearsal	Belle	
1975	Once Is Not Enough	Karla	
1975	Kipros	Herself	
1977	Nasty Habits	Sister Gertrude	
1978	A Dream of Passion	Maya	
1981	Gynaikes stin exoria	Narrator	Voice, short, (final film role)

=== Tribute ===
The song "Melina" by Camilo Sesto (from the 1975 album Amor libre) is dedicated to Melína Merkoúri.

On 18 October 2015, Google Doodle commemorated her 95th birthday.

== Gallery ==
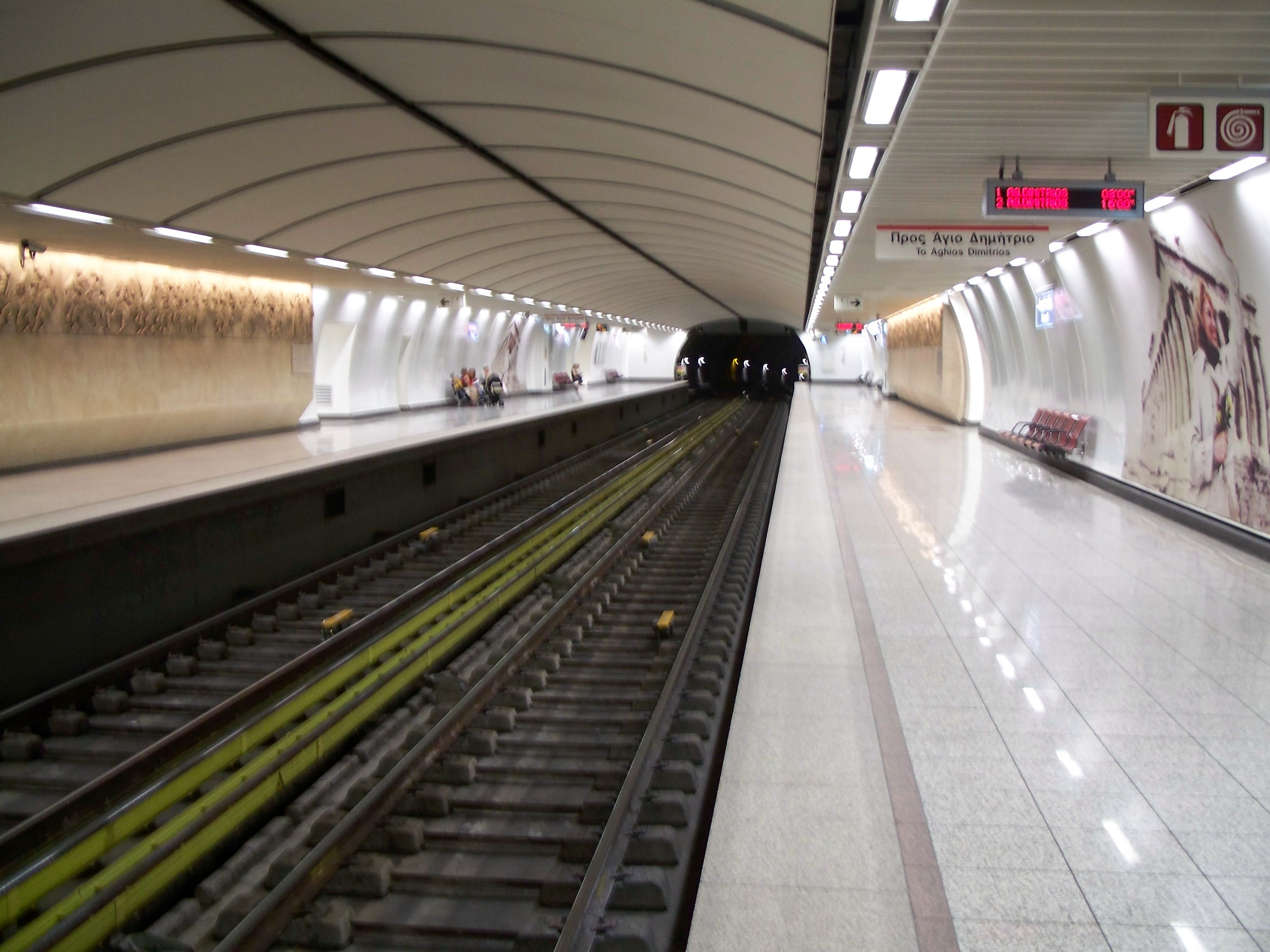
Athens Metro Acropolis station. Mercouri's photograph is on the right.

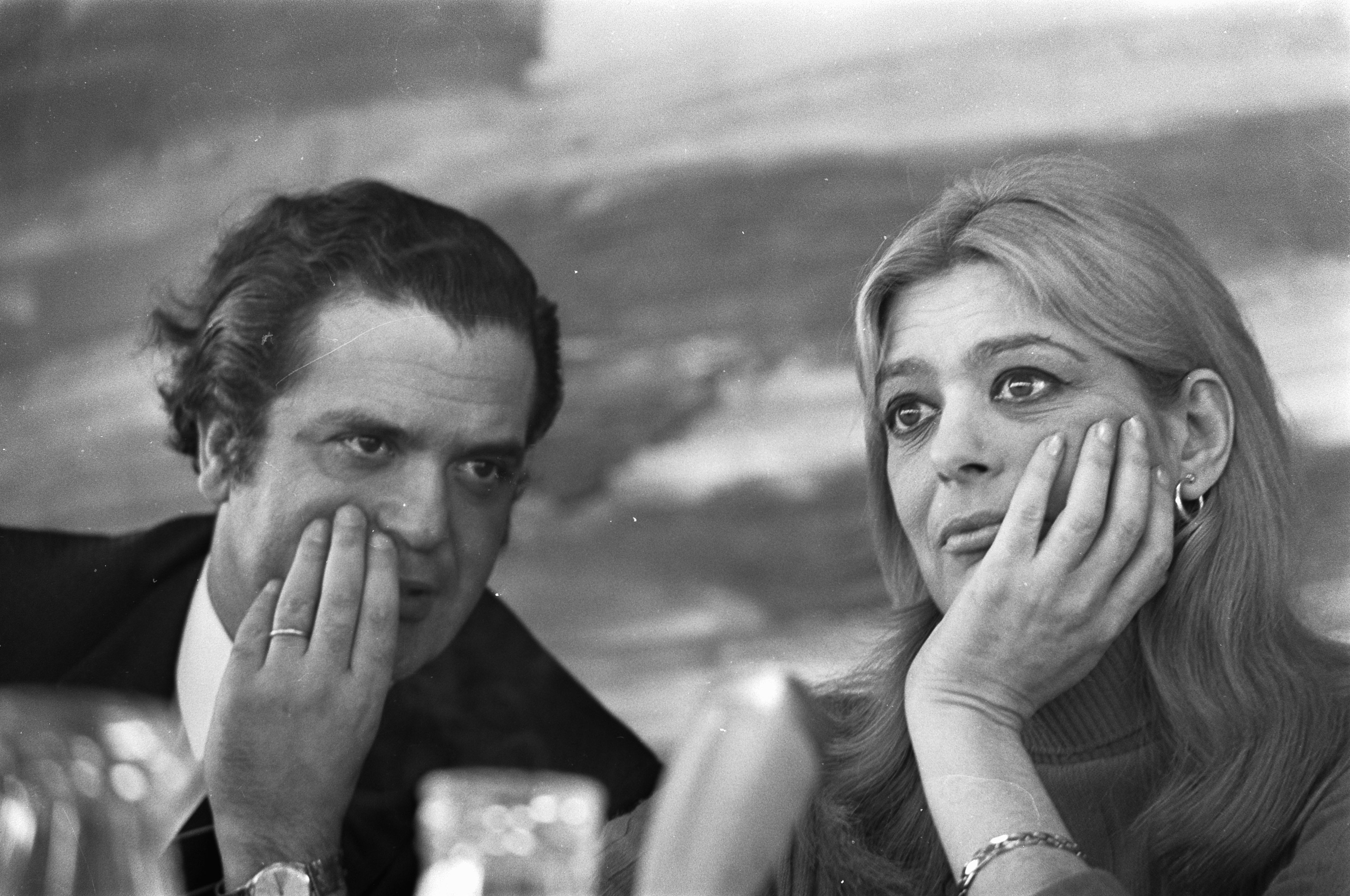
Mercouri (14 May 1968), Nijs, Jac. de, Anefo

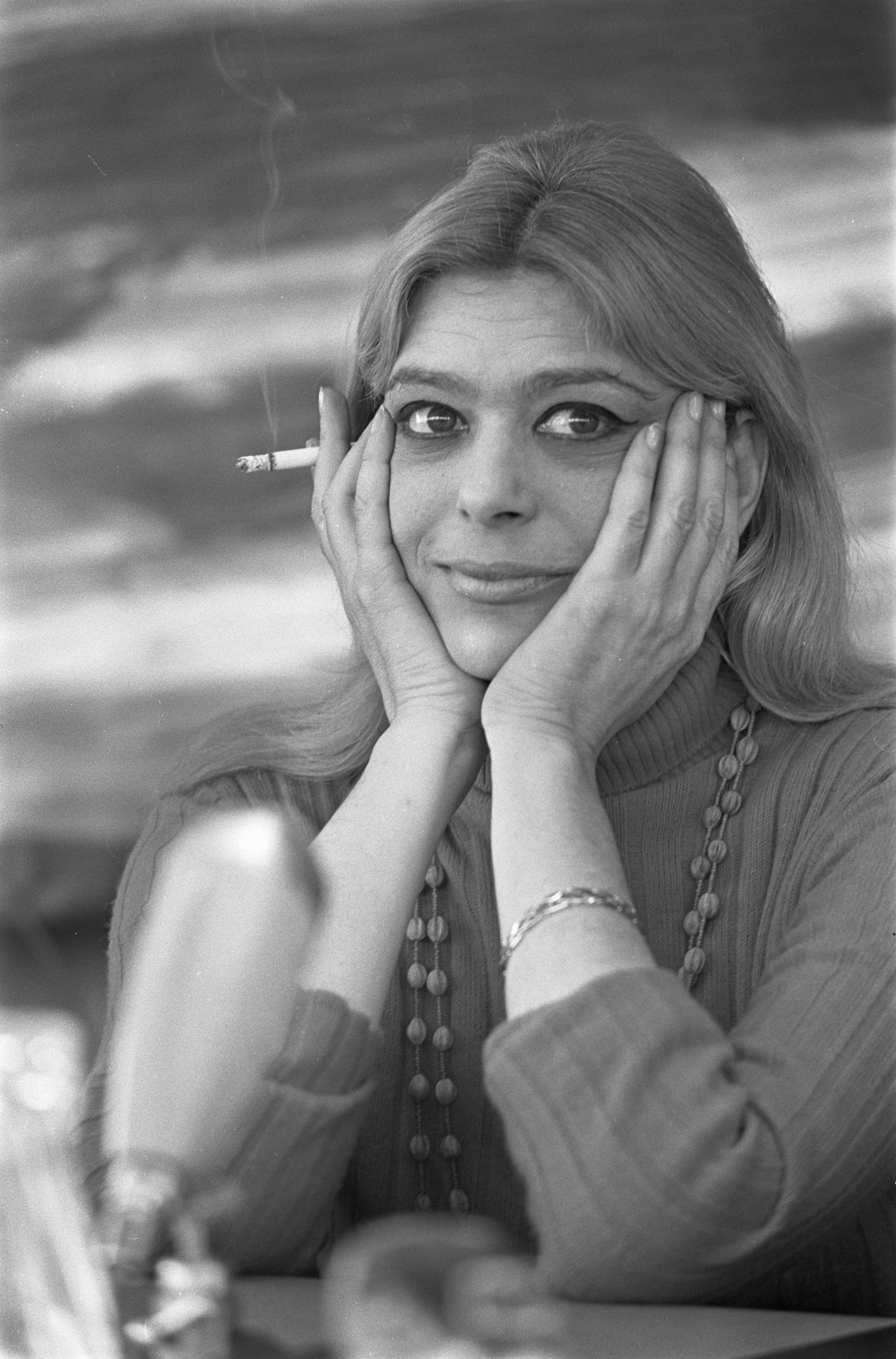
Mercouri (14 May 1968), Nijs, Jac. de, Anefo

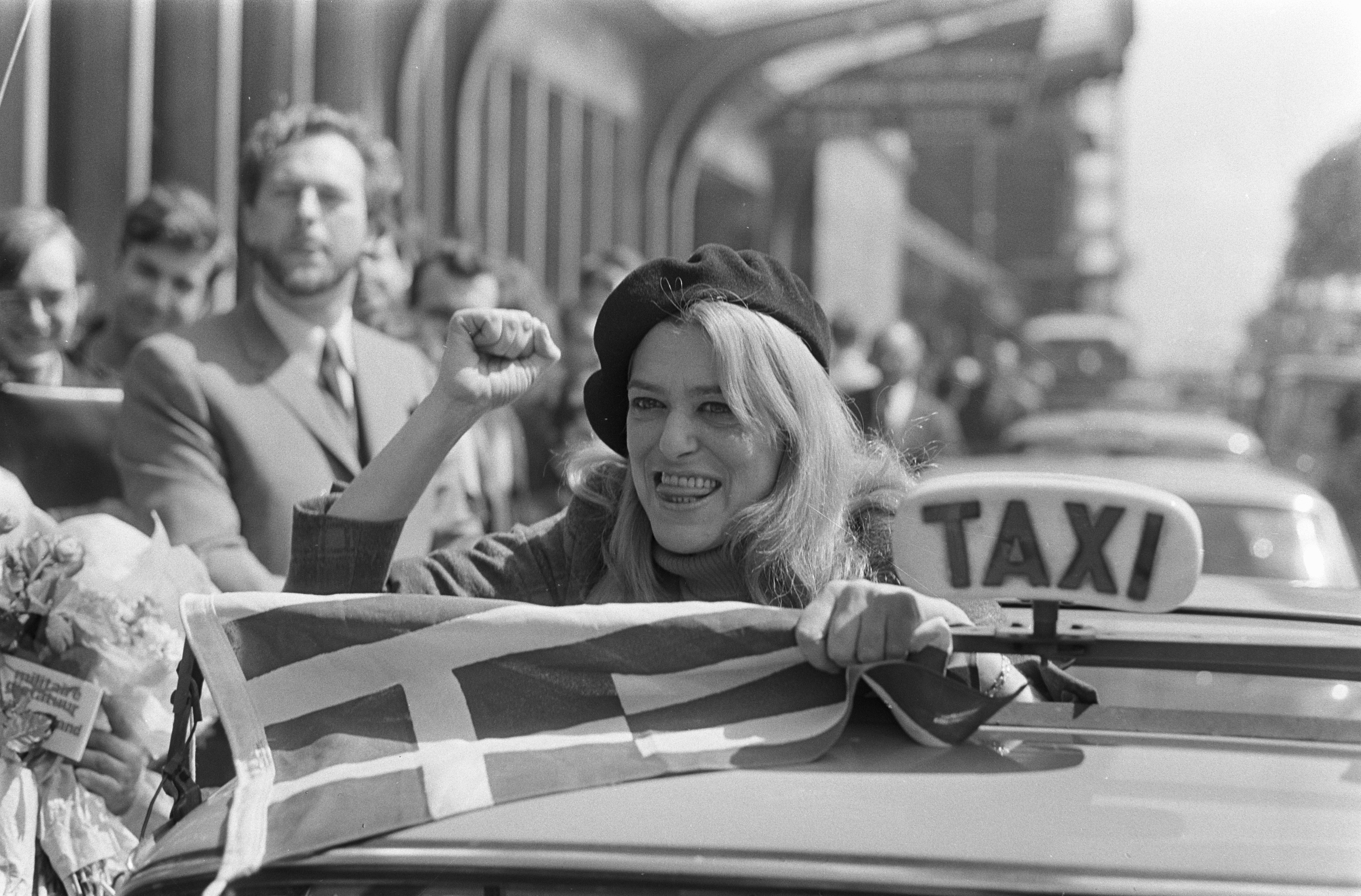
Mercouri, Amsterdam, Greek flag (1968), Nijs, Jac. de, Anefo

Mercouri's signature (14 May 1989), Visitors Book of the Kavala Municipal Library

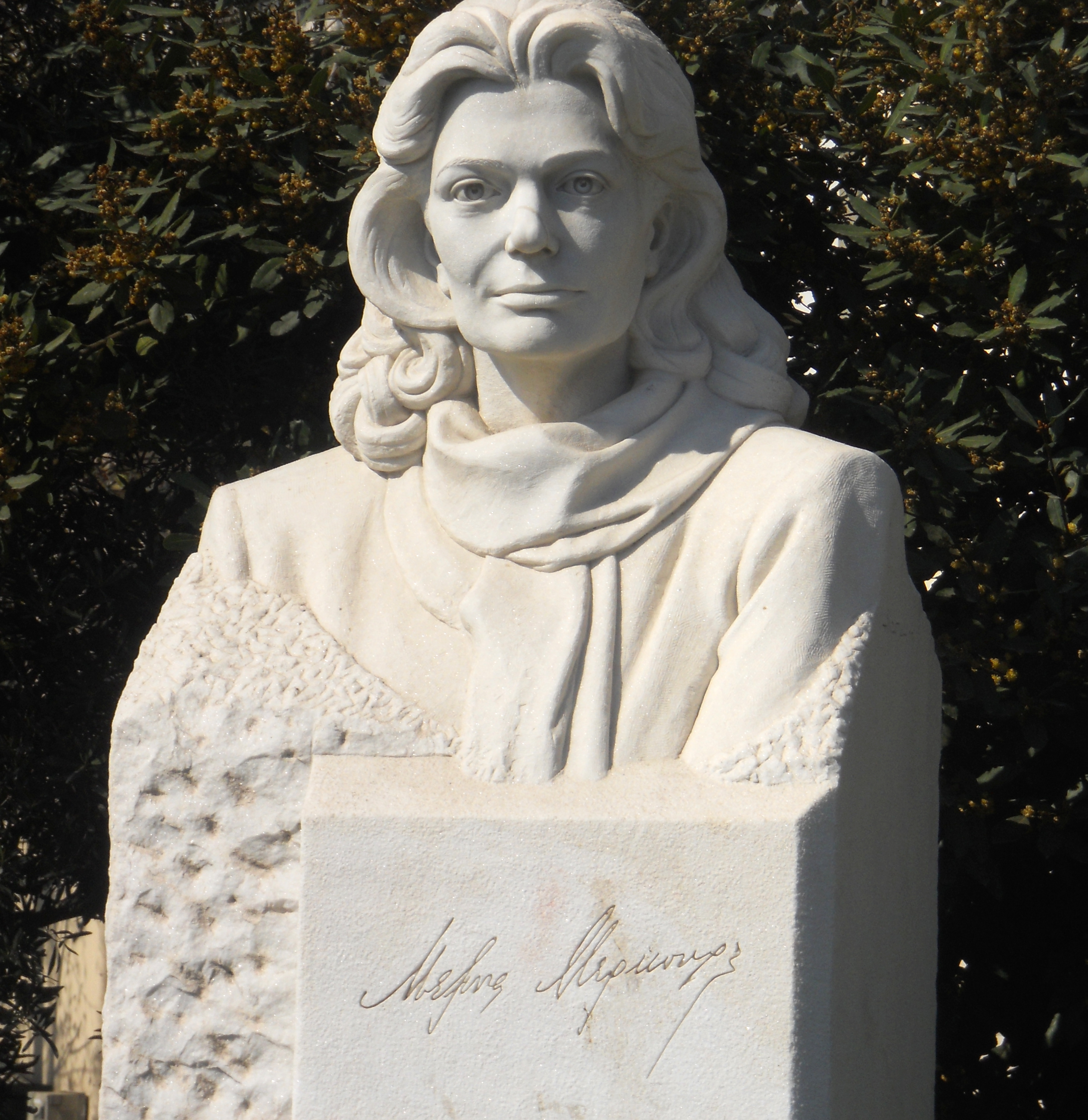
Statue of Mercouri, Vasilisis Amalias Avenue, Athens (2010)

== Notes ==
Political offices
Preceded by Andreas Andrianopoulos	Minister for Culture of Greece; 1981–1989	Succeeded by Georgios Mylonas
Preceded by Dora Bakoyannis	Minister for Culture of Greece; 1993–1994	Succeeded by Thanos Mikroutsikos
