= Stamatis Merkouris =

Greek politician

- Born: 1895; Athens, Greece
- Died: 7 July 1967 (aged 71–72); London, United Kingdom

Stamatis Merkouris (Greek: Σταμάτης Μερκούρης; 1895–1967) was a Greek Army officer and politician, who served as an MP and a Cabinet Minister. A member of the prominent Merkouris family, he was the son of Spyridon Mercouris, long-serving Mayor of Athens in the early 20th century, and the younger brother of George Mercouris, far-right politician and Cabinet Minister. In contrast to his conservative father and brother, Stamatis would end up becoming a Member of Parliament for the Left; his daughter was the famous actress Melina Mercouri, Minister of Culture in the socialist government of Andreas Papandreou.

== Biography ==
Stamatis Merkouris was born in Athens in 1895, son of Spyridon Mercouris and younger brother of George Mercouris. He graduated from the Hellenic Military Academy as a second lieutenant of Cavalry, and fought in World War I in 1917–1918 and the Greco-Turkish War of 1919–1922. The Mercouri were an Arvanite family.

He then left the Army and entered politics, taking part in the creation of the People's Party, Greece's main center-right political force at the time. Merkouris later left the People's Party and joined the National Radical Party, founded by the former General Georgios Kondylis. From 1929 until 1932, Stamatis Merkouris served as General Director of the Athens city government, under his father Spyridon Mercouris, who was then serving his last term as Mayor of Athens.

In 1935, he served as Undersecretary to the Prime Minister's Office, during Kondylis's brief premiership. During World War II, and after the Nazis had occupied Greece, he founded a resistance organization, the Rizospastiki Organosis (literally "Radical Organization") which, though small in size, helped many Greek officers and soldiers escape to the Middle East, where they joined the Allied war effort.

After the liberation of Greece from the Nazis in 1944, Merkouris resumed his political career and became a government Minister, serving as Minister of Public Order (1945–1946), and Minister of Public Works (1946). He founded his own party, the Democratic Progressive Party which was eventually disbanded, and later he ended up collaborating with the Greek United Democratic Left, serving as a Member of Parliament for them representing Athens, from 1958 until 1961, and from 1963 until his death in 1967.

== Personal life ==
His daughter was actress and political activist Melina Mercouri, Minister of Culture in the socialist government of Andreas Papandreou.
