= Karolos Koun =

Greek theater director (1908–1987)

- Κάρολος Κουν
- Born: 13 September 1908; Bursa, Ottoman Empire
- Died: 14 February 1987 (aged 78); Athens, Greece
- Occupation: Theater director

Karolos Koun (Greek: Κάρολος Κουν; September 13, 1908 – February 14, 1987) was a prominent Greek theater director, widely known for his lively staging of ancient Greek plays.

== Biography ==
Koun was born in Bursa, Ottoman Empire to a Greek mother and a Polish Jewish father. He was educated in Ottoman Turkey until the end of high school. He graduated from Robert College in Istanbul and then went to Sorbonne for his university education. As his family's economic situation worsened, he couldn't continue his education.

He had been praised all over Europe for his bawdy, colorful stagings of the 5th century BC political comedies of Aristophanes. In 1942, he founded the experimental Art Theater and its drama school.

Koun gave premieres in Athens of works by avant-garde European playwrights such as Bertolt Brecht and Luigi Pirandello. In 1962, Koun's production of The Birds by Aristophanes won first prize at an international festival at Paris. He also directed many plays by Aristophanes like The Frogs, Peace (play), Thesmophoriazusae, Lysistrata, and The Acharnians.

He worked with famed actress Melina Mercouri. She played Blanche Dubois in A Streetcar Named Desire which was staged by Koun's Art Theater. Other playwrights that Koun introduced to Greek audiences include Jean Genet, Federico García Lorca and Eugène Ionesco. He also directed modern and classic plays like A Midsummer Night's Dream, The Caucasian Chalk Circle, The Murder of Marat, and Greek plays like The Karaghiozis almost Vizier by George Skourtis and The Babylon by Dimitris Byzantios.

Koun collaborated with famous Greeks like Manos Xatzidakis, George Bakalo, Odysseas Elytis, Giannis Tsarouxis, Rallou Manoy, Basilis Rotas, Zouzou Nikoloudi, Maria Kynigou Mikis Theodorakis. Technis Theatre managed to be one of the more successful theatres in Greece and the world. The Birds travelled all over the world like other theatre performances like Lysistrata, which was presented to London with Oedipus Rex. Koun had many students who continued the theatre after Koun's death.

He stayed politically active all his life which had a direct impact on his not having financial security in his life. His theater was responsible for training the golden generation of Greek movie actors.

Karolos Koun died on February 14, 1987 in Athens, after suffering a heart attack, aged 78.
