= Spyridon Mercouris =

Greek politician (1856–1939)

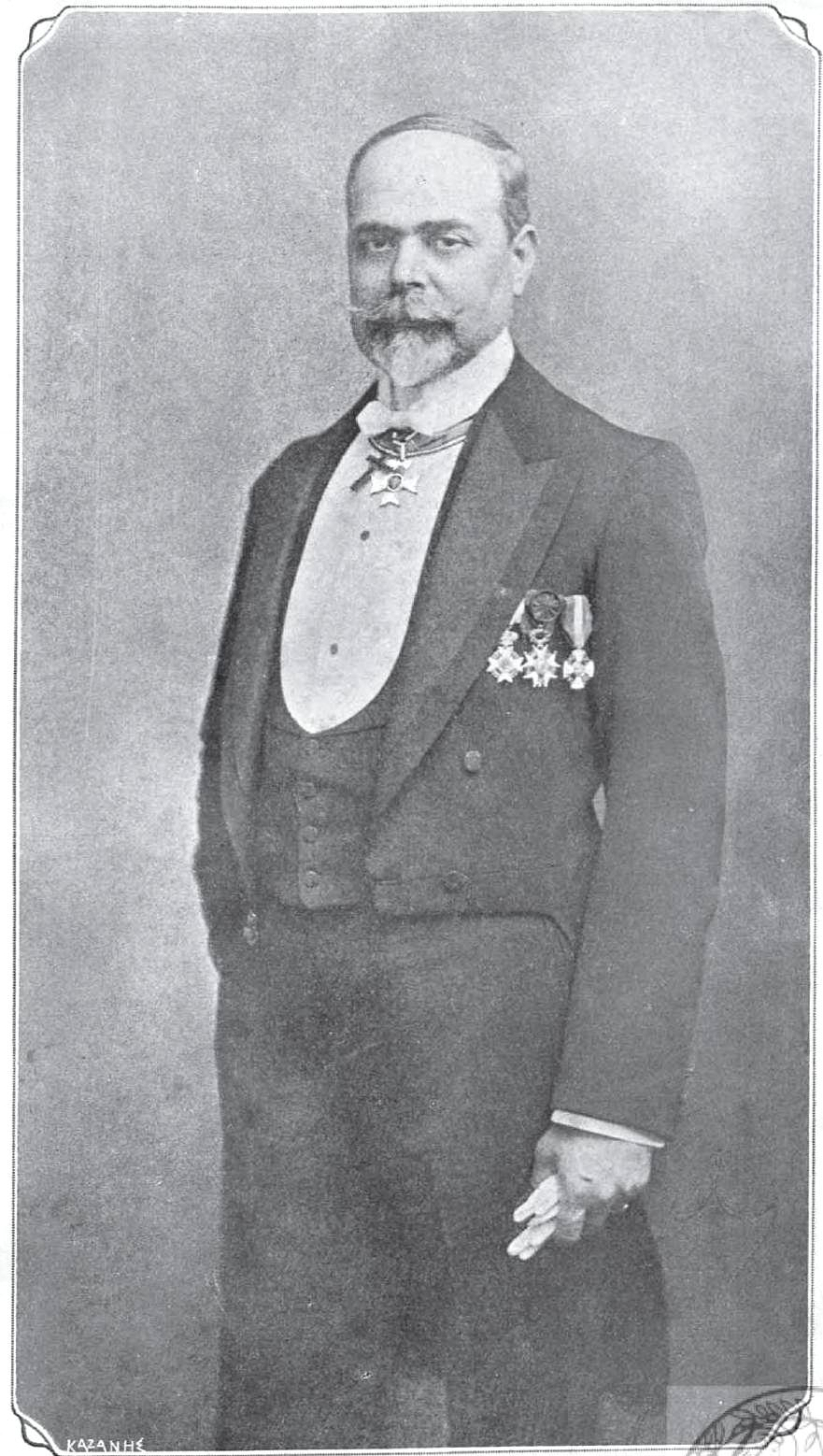
- Mercouris in 1907

Mayor of Athens
- In office 1929–1932
- In office 1899–1914
- Preceded by: Lambros Kallifronas
- Succeeded by: Emmanouil Benakis

Personal details
- Born: 1856 Ermioni, Argolis, Greece
- Died: 1939 (aged 82–83)
- Relations: Melina Mercouri (granddaughter); Jules Dassin (paternal grandson-in-law); Joe Dassin (paternal step great grandson-in-law)
- Children: George; Stamatis

Spyridon Mercouris (Greek: Σπυρίδων Μερκούρης; 1856–1939) was a Greek politician and long-serving mayor of Athens in the early 20th century.

He was born in Ermioni, Argolida, in 1856 to a prominent and wealthy family that had taken part in the Greek War of Independence in the 1820s. He was the son of Georgios Mercouris, captain and son of Spyridon Mercouris, and Theodora (or Theodota) Mitsas, daughter of the chieftain of the Greek revolution and later MP of Ermionida and authorized representative in national assemblies Stamatis Mitsas, and sister of the military and also MP of Ermionida Antonios Mitsas. Through the Mitsa family, he was a close by marriage relative of the historical Zakynthian family of the Motsenigos.

The Mercouri were an Arvanite family, originating in Argolida. Elected as mayor of Athens in 1899, he held the post continuously until 1914. As a committed conservative royalist, in summer 1917, during the National Schism, he was exiled to Corsica by the Venizelists. He was also accused of complicity in the riots of the Noemvriana of 1916, he was tried and sentenced to death in 1919. He was released from prison in 1920 after the win of the antivenizelists. He was elected as a Member of Parliament representing Atticoboeotia in 1928 and re-elected as Mayor of Athens in 1929.

He served as mayor until 1932, and died in 1939. His sons Stamatis and George served as members of the Greek Parliament (MP) and cabinet ministers, whilst his granddaughter Melina Mercouri was an actress who later was elected an MP and served as the Greek Minister of Culture and Science.
