= Greek National Socialist Party =

Greek National Socialist Party Ελληνικό Εθνικό Σοσιαλιστικό Κόμμα
- Founder: George S. Mercouris
- Founded: 1932
- Dissolved: 1943
- Newspaper: Ethniki Simaia
- Ideology: Nazism; Greek ultranationalism
- Political position: Far-right
- Religion: Greek Orthodox
- International affiliation: Fascist International (1934)
- Colours: Blue White

Party flag
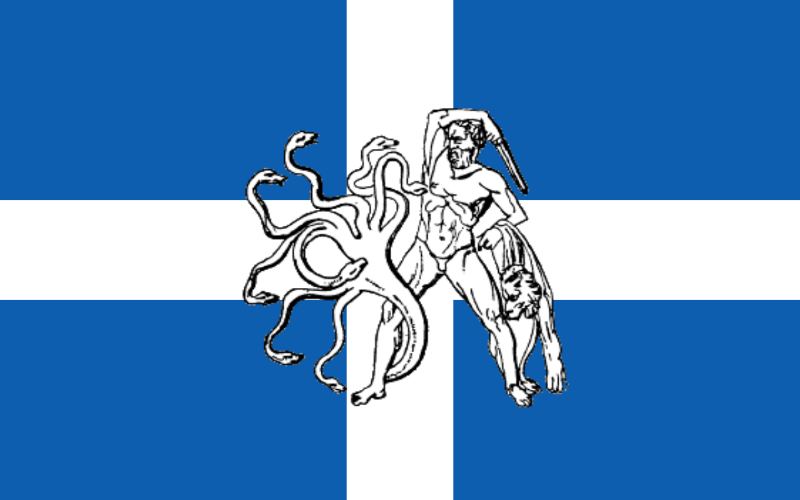

The Greek National Socialist Party (Greek: Ελληνικό Εθνικό Σοσιαλιστικό Κόμμα, romanized: Elliniko Ethniko Sosialistiko Komma) was a Nazi party founded in Greece in 1932 by George S. Mercouris, a former Cabinet minister.

== History ==
Established in Athens in December 1932, the National Socialist Party was one of the far right groups active in the country at the time, others including the National Union of Greece (Εθνική Ενωση Ελλάδος), Iron Peace (Σιδηρά Ειρήνη), Trident (Τρίαινα), and National Sovereign State (Εθνικό Κυρίαρχο Κράτος, led by Skilakakis). However, it was distinguished by being the most fiercely supportive of Adolf Hitler, seeking to copy the Nazi Party in organizational and policy terms.

The party emerged after Mercouris, who had previously shown sympathy to Italian fascist trade unions, split from Panagis Tsaldaris and the Populist Party over the need for a coalition government. Through contacts with Galeazzo Ciano, Mercouris secured funding for the new group from Italy, although this soon dried up as they were not convinced that the party was in any position to gain power.

Initially, the party had its main offices at 10-12, Karagiorgi Servias street in central Athens. From those premises they published a morning newspaper called Ethniki Simaia ("National Flag"), starting in December 1934.

The party itself was largely geared towards Italian fascism, although Mercouris himself and some of his main followers were more drawn to the German model. Mercouris was sometimes used as a go-between by the collaborationist government during the German occupation.

== Political support ==
The Greek party, however did not serve the regime of Ioannis Metaxas, although given the monarchist stance of the party many of its followers were reconciled to the new government. During the Axis occupation of Greece the group was allowed to continue, although it had no real role in the largely military-based Greek government and faced competition from the other extremist movements. It had hoped to gain influence but the Germans reasoned that given its chronic lack of popular support it was not expedient to offer the party any power.
