= Kadi =

Kadi may refer to:

== Radio ==
- KADI-FM, a radio station (99.5 FM) licensed to serve Republic, Missouri, United States
- KICK (AM), a radio station (1340 AM) licensed to serve Springfield, Missouri, which held the call sign KADI from 2005 to 2015
- WFUN-FM, a radio station (96.3 FM) licensed to serve St. Louis, Missouri, which held the call sign KADI from 1983 to 1987
- KSIV (AM), a radio station (1320 AM) licensed to serve Clayton, Missouri, which held the call sign KADI from 1975 to 1978 and 1979 to 1982
- Raadio Kadi, a radio station in Estonia

== Other ==
- Kadi (name)
- Kadi, Central African Republic, a village in Ouham-Fafa Prefecture, Central African Republic
- Kadi, India, a city and municipality in Mehsana district, Gujarat, India
- Kadi, an aromatic plant (Pandanus odorifer)
- Kadhi, an Indian dish
- Kadi (Ottoman); Turkish: Kadı), an official in the Ottoman Empire
- Qadi or kadi, Islamic judge
- Al-Qadi, an Arabic surname
- Qazi family of Lakhnauti, a medieval Bengali family
- Quadi, an ancient Germanic tribe
- Kadi I and Kadi II, two EU law cases involving Yassin Kadi

== See also ==
- Kazi (disambiguation)
- Cadi (disambiguation)
- Alcalde (disambiguation)
- Kati (disambiguation)
- Kady, a given name
- Kady, Gmina Grodzisk Mazowiecki, a village in Masovian Voivodeship, Poland
