= Gazi (disambiguation) =

Gazi or Ghazi may refer to:

- A gazi or ghāzī is a frontier warrior in Islam.

== People ==
- Gazi or Ghazi is also used as an honorific Muslim and specifically Ottoman title that appears in the names of many historic figures, notably:
  - Gazi Saiyyed Salar Sahu (died 1032), army commander of Mahmad Ghaznavi
  - Gazi Evrenos, Ottoman military commander
  - Osman al-Ghazi (1299–1326). founder of the Ottoman Empire
  - Gazi Pir, Bengali Muslim saint
  - Gazi Chelebi, pirate and ruler of Sinop, Turkey
  - Gazi-Husrev Beg (1480–1541), Bosnian bey
  - Gazi Osman Pasha (1832–1897), Ottoman field marshal
  - Gazi Mustafa Kemal (1881–1938), the name of Atatürk, founder of the Republic of Turkey, until the Turkish Surname Law of 1934
- Gazi Mazharul Anwar (1943–2022), Bangladeshi film director, producer and lyricist
- Gazi Yaşargil (1925–2025), Turkish medical scientist and neurosurgeon

== Places ==
- Gazi, Athens, a neighbourhood in Athens, Greece
- Gazi, Crete, a town in Greece
- Gazi, Hormozgan, a village in Hormozgan Province, Iran
- Gazi, Istanbul, a neighborhood in Istanbul, Turkey
- Gazi, North Khorasan, a village in North Khorasan Province, Iran
- Gazi, Razavi Khorasan, a village in Razavi Khorasan Province, Iran
- Gazi, Sistan and Baluchestan, a village in Sistan and Baluchestan Province, Iran
- Gaziantep, a city in Turkey

== Other uses ==
- Gazi language, a Central Iranian language of Iran
- Gazi University, a university in Ankara, Turkey
- Gazi Thesis, a historiographical thesis used to explain the rise of the Ottoman Empire
- Gazi Group, a Bangladeshi conglomerate company
  - Gazi Group Cricketers, a Bangladeshi cricket team owned by the Gazi Group of companies

== See also ==
- Ghazi (disambiguation)
- Kazi (disambiguation)
- Kasi (disambiguation)
- Razzia (military)
