= KADY =

KADY or Kady may refer to:

- Kady, a feminine given name
- KADY (Missouri), a former radio station in St. Charles, Missouri, from 1958 to 1965
- KWHY, a television station in Garden Grove, California, that used the call letters KADY-TV from 1988 to 2004
- Kady, Gmina Grodzisk Mazowiecki, a village in Poland
