= Ghazi =

Ghazi or Gazi (Arabic: غازى), a title given to Muslim warriors or champions and used by several Ottoman Sultans, may refer to:

- Ghazi (warrior), the term for a Muslim soldier

== People ==
=== Given name ===
- Ghazi of Iraq (1912–1939), King of the Kingdom of Iraq
- Prince Ghazi bin Muhammad (born 1966), Jordanian prince and academic
- Ghazi Aridi (born 1954), Lebanese politician
- Gazi Evrenos (1288–1417), Ottoman military commander
- Ghazi Abdul Rahman Al Gosaibi (1940–2010), Saudi Arabian politician, technocrat and novelist
- Ghazi Honeini (born 1995), Lebanese footballer
- Gazi Husrev-beg (1480–1541), Bosnian bey
- Ghazi Saiyyad Salar Masud (1014–1034), Ghaznavid army general
- Ghazi Muhammad (1793–1832), first imam of Dagestan, autonomous state of the Russian Federation
- Ghazi Ajil al-Yawer (born 1958), former President of Iraq
- Ghazi Shami, American music executive

=== Surname ===
- Abid Ghazi, (1935–2013), Pakistani footballer
- Abdul Rashid Ghazi (1964–2007), Islamic fundamentalist and Chancellor Faridia University
- Ahmad ibn Ibrahim al-Ghazi (1506–1543), imam and general of the Adal Empire
- Badr Al Din Abu Ghazi (1920–1983), Egyptian art critic and writer
- Emad Abu Ghazi (born 1955), Egyptian scholar
- Ertuğrul Gazi (died c. 1280), father of Osman Gazi
- Habibullah Ghazi (1891–1929), Emir of Afghanistan
- Osman Gazi (1299–1326), founder of the Ottoman dynasty
- Moosa Ghazi, (1938–2003), Pakistani footballer
- Shabnam K. Ghazi (born 1971), Iranian-born Canadian artist

== Places ==
=== Afghanistan ===
- Ghazi Stadium, multi-purpose stadium in Kabul

=== Greece ===
- Gazi, Athens, a neighborhood in Athens, Greece
- Gazi, Crete, a town in Greece

=== Iran ===
- Ghazi, Iran, a city in North Khorasan Province
- Gazi, Hormozgan, a village in Hormozgan Province, Iran
- Ghazi Rural District, an administrative subdivision of North Khorasan Province, Iran
- Gazi, Sistan and Baluchestan, a village in Sistan and Baluchestan Province, Iran

=== Kosovo ===
- Gazimestan, a memorial site and monument dedicated to Gazi Evrenos in Pristina

=== Pakistan ===
- Ghazi, Haripur, a town
- Dera Ghazi Khan District
- Dera Ghazi Khan District

=== Turkey ===
- Gaziantep, a city in Turkey
- Gazi University

== Other uses ==
- PNS Ghazi, a Pakistan Navy submarine sunk in the Indo-Pakistani War of 1971, formerly known as USS Diablo (SS-479)
- Ghazi (film), a 2017 Indian film about the submarine
- Muslim Gaddi, a people of India, also known as Ghazi

== See also ==
- Gazi (disambiguation)
- Gaza (disambiguation)
- Khasi (disambiguation)
- Razzia (disambiguation)
