= Cadi =

Cadi, CADI, or Cadí may refer to:

CADI:

- Canadian Advanced Digital Ionosonde
- Career and Academic Development Institute, high school in Philadelphia
- Chengdu Aircraft Design Institute, an aircraft design institute located in Chengdu, China
- Club Aeronautique Delisle Incorporated, Canadian aircraft manufacturer

Cadi/Cadí:

- Cadi, Cadillac automobile
- Cadi, Welsh equivalent of Katherine
- Cadi Scientific, Singapore-based manufacturer of healthcare active RFID tags and systems
- Toponyms:
  - Romansh name of Disentis Abbey and its territories, see Cadi (Surselva)
  - Cadi (Phrygia), town and bishopric of ancient Phrygia
  - Dharug name of Sydney and surrounds
  - (El) Cadí or Cady (river), in SW Europe

== See also ==
- Serra del Cadí, Spanish mountain range
- Cady (disambiguation)
- Kadi (disambiguation)
- Kazi (disambiguation)
- Kady, Gmina Grodzisk Mazowiecki, a village in east-central Poland
- Kady, a given name
- Qadi or cadi, a magistrate or judge of a Shariʿa court
