= Khasi =

Khasi may refer to:

- Khasi people, an ethnic group of Meghalaya, India
- Khasi language, a major Austroasiatic language spoken in Meghalaya, India
- Khāṣi language, an Indo-Aryan language of Jammu and Kashmir, India

== See also ==
- Khasi Hills
- Ghazi (disambiguation)
