= Callowhill, Philadelphia =

Neighborhood of Philadelphia, Pennsylvania

Callowhill
- Neighborhood of Philadelphia
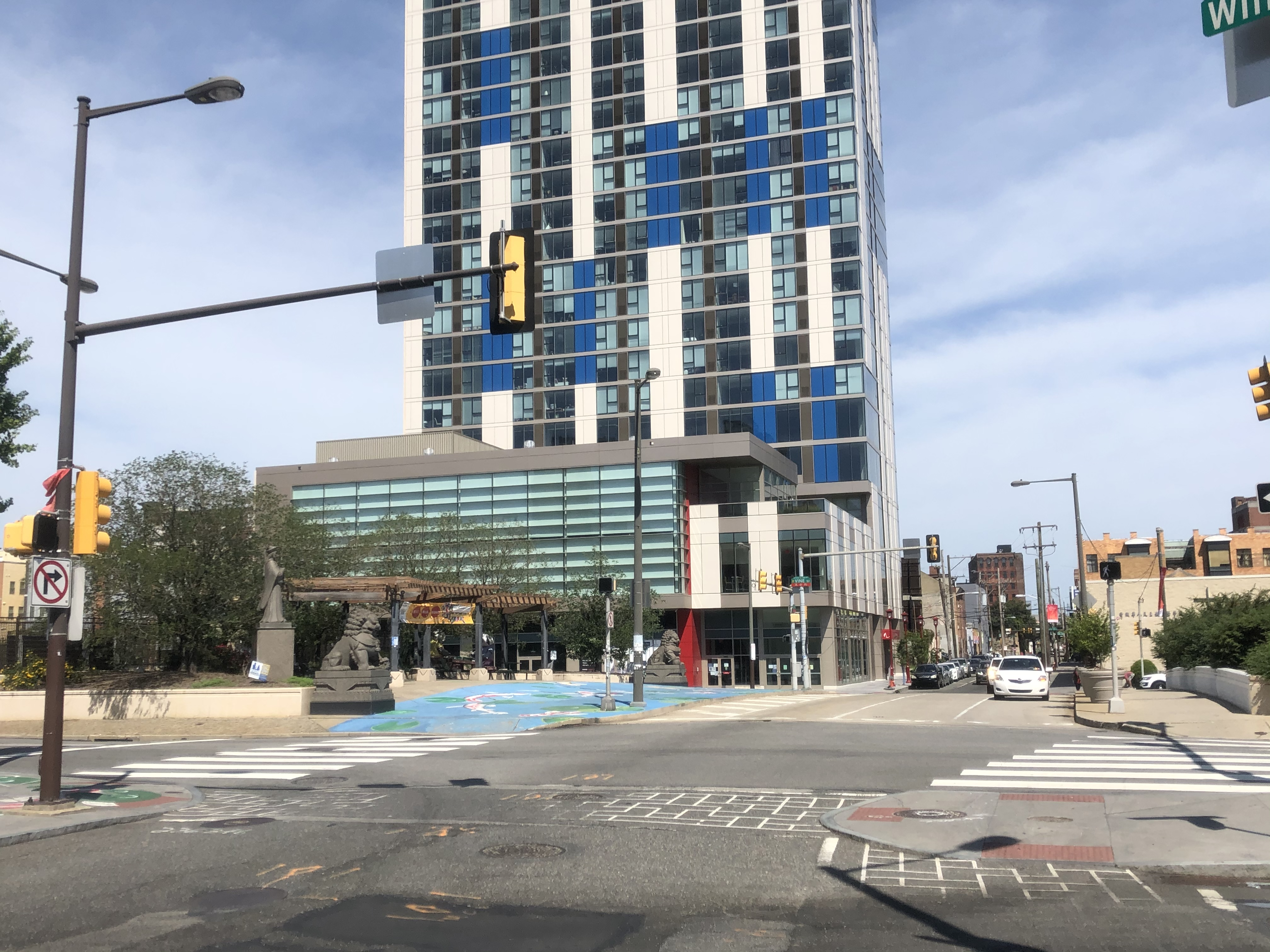
- View of Callowhill from Chinatown

- Location of the Callowhill section of Philadelphia
- Coordinates: 39°57′36″N 75°09′29″W
- Country: United States
- State: Pennsylvania
- County: Philadelphia
- City: Philadelphia
- Area codes: 215, 267, and 445

Callowhill is an unofficial name for a neighborhood in Philadelphia, Pennsylvania, located roughly in the vicinity of Callowhill Street, between Vine, Spring Garden, Broad, and 8th streets. The name "Callowhill" was coined by the Callowhill Neighborhood Association, a community organization in the area; although this name often appears on online maps, the City of Philadelphia does not have an official name for this area. Callowhill is named for Callowhill Street, which was named after Hannah Callowhill Penn, William Penn's second wife and de facto proprietor of Pennsylvania after William Penn.

Callowhill was formerly home to large-scale manufacturing and other industries, of which an architectural history has been left in the form of grand old abandoned factories. During the 1970s and 1980s, the population of Callowhill plummeted, and although numbers are rising, it is a fairly unpopulated section of the city compared to surrounding neighborhoods. Recently developers have started to employ adaptive reuse projects, converting them into loft style housing; so much so that many have termed the neighborhood "The Loft District". In 2010, the Callowhill Industrial Historic District was added to the National Register of Historic Places.

Callowhill is physically cut off from its neighbor to the south, Chinatown, by the Vine Street Expressway. This has largely prevented Chinese businesses from spreading north, although some industrial and storage uses by the Chinese community have been placed in Callowhill. Vine Street is also blamed for the abrupt drop in pedestrian life above Chinatown, and the struggle faced by efforts to redevelop this section of the city that lies between Center City and North Philadelphia.

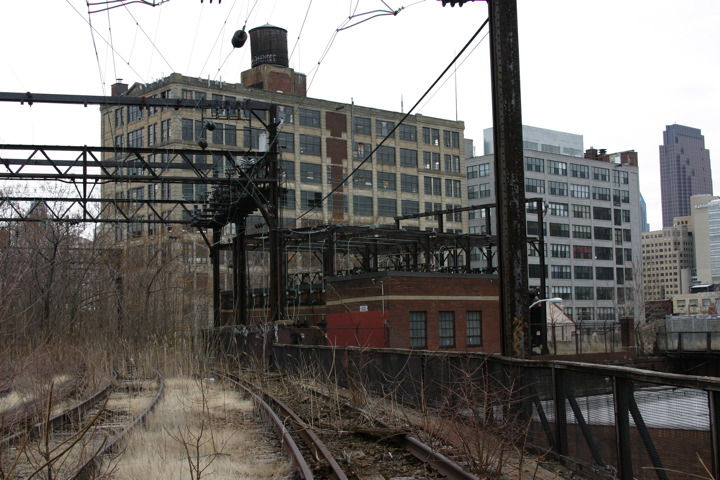
Reading Viaduct in the Callowhill neighborhood

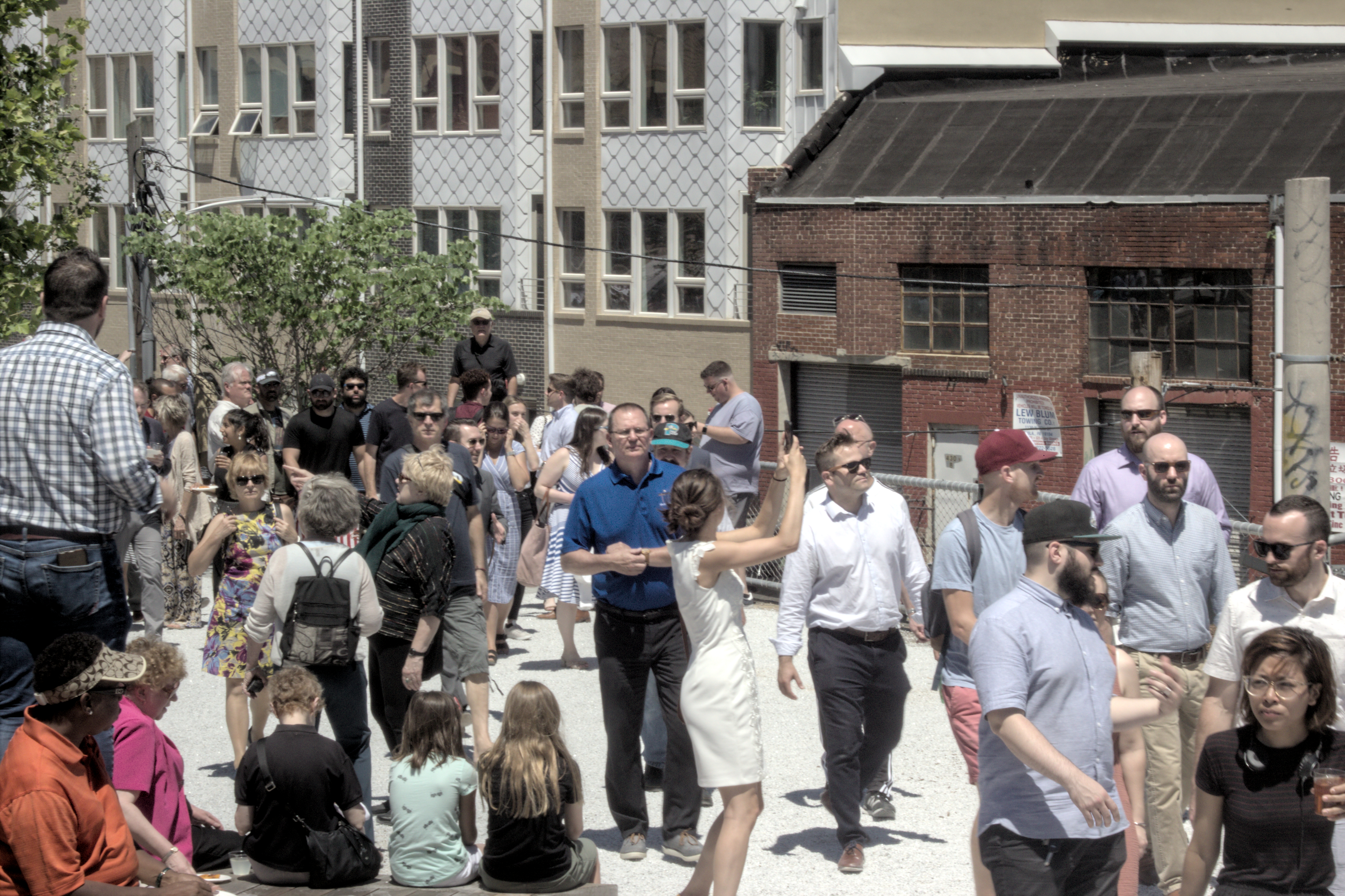
Crowds attending the opening of The Rail Park.

The former Reading Railroad train trestle, the Reading Viaduct, is a defining feature of the Callowhill neighborhood. Neighborhood groups proposed that the abandoned structure be maintained as a public park. The Reading Viaduct park plan gained momentum in 2009 when Philadelphia's Center City District (CCD), and its influential president Paul Levy, became enamored of the idea and ultimately became a partner to help manage the project. CCD announced on Tuesday, February 6, 2018 that the first phase of the quarter-mile-long, elevated park would open in spring 2018. The grand opening of the Rail Park was held on June 14, 2018, attracting a large crowd.

== Education ==
- Career and Academic Development Institute
- Mathematics, Civics and Sciences Charter School
- Roman Catholic High School

== Points of interest ==
- Callowhill Industrial Historic District
- Franklin Music Hall
- Goodman Brothers and Hinlein Company
- Packard Motor Corporation Building
- Philadelphia Lodge No. 2 BPOE (1925)
- Reading Viaduct
- Smaltz Building
- Terminal Commerce Building
- Union Transfer

== See also ==
- National Register of Historic Places listings in Center City, Philadelphia
