= Kazi =

Kazi may refer to:

- Kazi (given name)
- David Kazi, Australian game designer
- Kaji (Nepal), Nepalese prime ministerial position (later reduced to ministers)
- Qadi or Kazi or Qazi, an Islamic legal scholar and judge
- KAZI, an FM radio station in Austin, Texas
- Kazi (comics), a fictional character in the Marvel Comics
  - Kazi (Marvel Cinematic Universe), the Marvel Cinematic Universe counterpart of the character
- Kazi, an honorific title used historically in the north Indian Kingdom of Sikkim
- Kazi, a mythical female healer of 8th century Czech mythology, the sister of Libuše
- "Kazi", nickname of Chris Rolle, hip hop musician
- Qazı is also a Kyrgyz dish and Kazakh dish
- Kazi Township, Lhünzhub County (卡孜乡), Tibet Autonomous Region, People's Republic of China
- Kazi Township, Namling County (卡孜乡), a township in Namling County in Tibet Autonomous Region
- The Japanese surname Kaji (surname), as written in Kunrei-shiki or Nihon-shiki
- Kazi (village), Pavlodar Region, Kazakhstan

== See also ==
- Kaji (disambiguation)
- Kadi (disambiguation)
- Cadi (disambiguation)
- Alcalde (disambiguation)
- Kasi (disambiguation)
- Gazi (disambiguation)
- Qazi (disambiguation)
