= Al-Qadi =

Al-Qadi is an Arabic surname. Notable people with the surname include:

- Abd al-Majeed al-Qadi (born 1934), Yemeni playwright and writer
- Ahmad Ibn al-Qadi (1552/3–1616), Moroccan writer
- Ali Al Qadi (1988–2023), Palestinian senior Hamas commander
- Ayad Alkadhi (born 1971), Iraqi-American artist
- Ihsane El Kadi (born 1959), Algerian journalist
- Isam al-Qadi (died 2006), Palestinian politician
- Fayez Rashid Ahmed Hassan Al-Qadi Banihammad (1977–2001), Emirati hijacker of United Airlines Flight 175 as part of the September 11 attacks
- Farhan Al-Qadi, former hostage of Hamas
- Hassan Al Qadhi (born 1983), Qatari footballer
- Naif Al-Qadi (born 1979), Saudi footballer
- Salim Al-Kadi, Lebanese artist
- Tobías Ariel Cervera Cadi (Born 2002), Argentinian footballer
- Yasin al-Qadi (born 1955), Saudi businessman and terror suspect
- Qadi Ayyad (1083–1149), Imam and later judge of the Almoravid Empire
