= Cady (given name) =

Cady is a typically feminine given name and nickname.

Those bearing it include:

== Women ==
- Cady Cantrell (born 1972), Playboy Playmate of the Month for April 1992
- Catherine Coleman (born 1960), American chemist, former United States Air Force officer and former NASA astronaut
- Catherine Cady Huffman (born 1965), American actress
- Cady Groves (1990–2020), American singer-songwriter
- Cady McClain (born 1969), American performer and author
- Cady Noland (born 1956), American artist

== Men ==
- Cady Staley (1840–1928), first president of Case School of Applied Science, now Case Western Reserve University
- Cady Wells (1904–1954), American painter and patron of the arts

== Fictional characters ==
- Cady Heron, a character (played by Lindsay) in the 2004 movie Mean Girls
- Cady, a character in the movie M3GAN

== See also ==
- Kady (given name)
- Caddy (name)
- Catie
- Katy (given name)
- Katie
- Cadys, a possibly legendary prince of ancient Lydia
- k.d. lang (born 1961), Canadian musician
