= Kadi (name) =

Kadi is both a surname and a given name. Notable people with the name include:

Surname:

- Abdussalam Al Qadi, Libyan politician
- Calvin Kadi (born 1982), South African football player
- Eddie Kadi (born 1983), British comedian, presenter, actor and MC
- Evdokia Kadi (born 1981), Greek Cypriot singer
- Nicholas Kadi (born 1952), Turkish-born Iraqi American actor

Given name:

- Kadi Pärnits (born 1965), Estonian politician, lawyer and trade union leader
- Kadi Sesay (born 1949), Sierra Leonean politician
- Kadi Sissoko (born 1999), French basketball player
- Kadi Taniloo (1911–1998), Estonian actress

== See also ==
- Kady (given name)
- Cady (given name)
- Cadi (disambiguation)
