= Qeshlaq-e Qazi =

Qeshlaq-e Qazi قشلاق قاضي
- Village
- Location within Iran
- Coordinates: 36°10′15″N 46°13′49″E
- Country: Iran
- Province: Kurdistan
- County: Saqqez
- Bakhsh: Sarshiv
- Rural District: Zu ol Faqr

Population (2006)
  - Total: 76
- Time zone: UTC+3:30 (IRST)
  - Summer (DST): UTC+4:30 (IRDT)

Qeshlaq-e Qazi (Persian: قشلاق قاضي, also Romanized as Qeshlāq-e Qāẕī) is a village in Zu ol Faqr Rural District, Sarshiv District, Saqqez County, Kurdistan Province, Iran. At the 2006 census, its population was 76, in 12 families. The village is populated by Kurds.

The name Qeshlaq-e Qazi refers to the winter quarters of judge. It combines the Turkic loanword of qeshlaq meaning winter settlement with the Persian connector word -e and the Arabic word Qazi meaning judge.
