= Afton Station Packard Museum =

Automotive museum in Oklahoma, U.S.

Afton Station
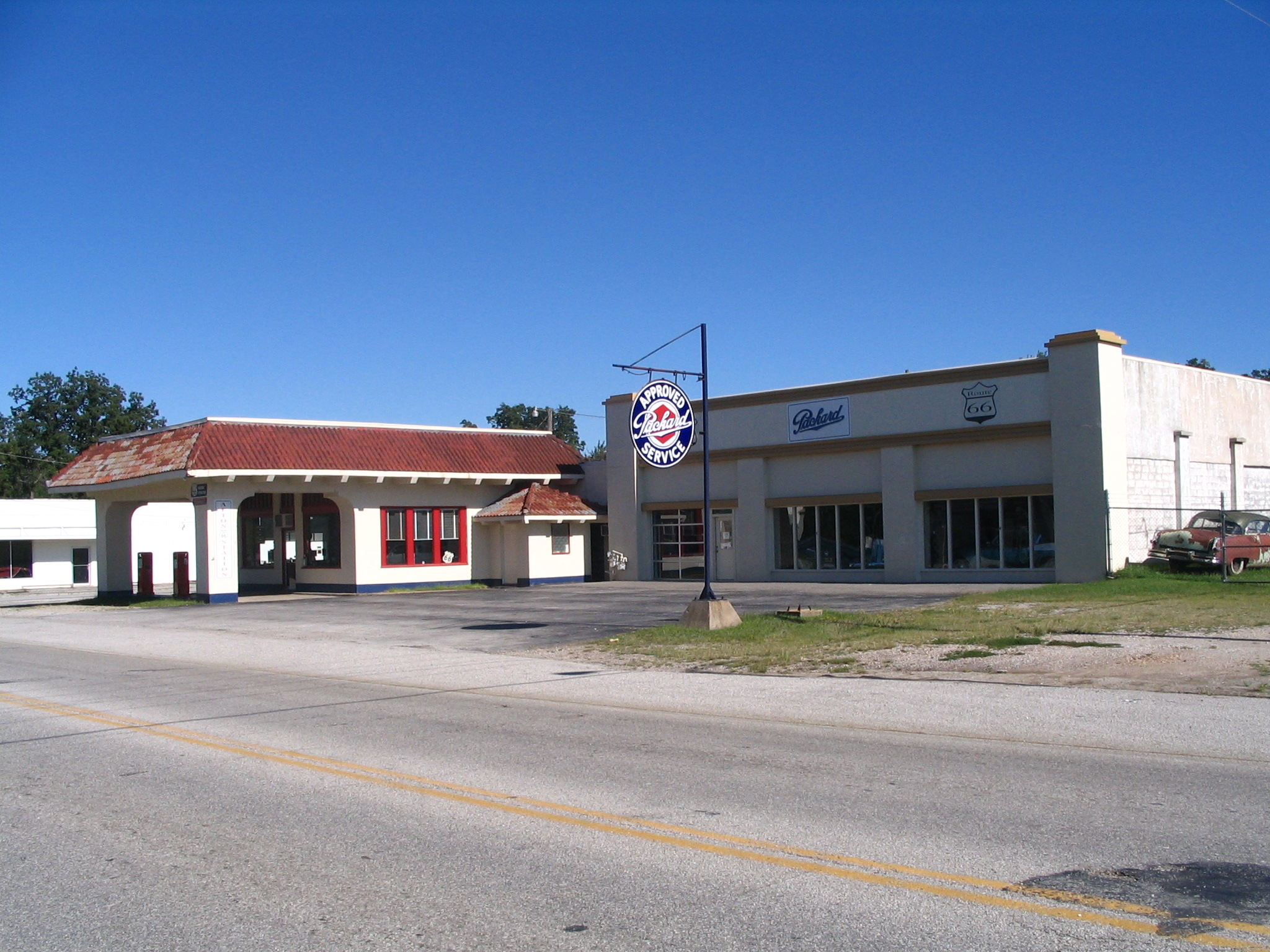
- Afton Station Packard Museum

- Afton, Oklahoma
- Established: 1999
- Location: 12 SE First Street, U.S. Route 66, Afton, Oklahoma
- Coordinates: 36.69437°N 94.96211°W
- Type: Packard automotive museum
- Collection size: 18 Packard and other vintage automobiles
- Visitors: 6000/yr (2012)
- Owners: Laurel and David Kane
- Website: www.aftonstationroute66.com

Afton Station Packard Museum, a privately owned automotive museum on U.S. Route 66 in Afton, Oklahoma, was situated in a restored 1930s Eagle D-X filling station. It housed a showroom, 18 Packards & other vintage automobiles plus a collection of Route 66 memorabilia, including items from the now-demolished Buffalo Ranch Trading Post.

A restored set of historic D-X fuel pumps stood in the old station's forecourt and the red and white on blue "Approved Packard Service" dealership logo was proudly displayed atop a signpost.

As a Route 66 information stop for travelers, who came from as far afield as Europe, Australia, and Asia, the station/welcome center distributed maps, guidebooks and memorabilia as well as word-of-mouth information about The Mother Road.

== History ==
Afton, established 1886 and named for River Afton in Scotland by a railroad surveyor, was once home to a railroad repair facility, turntable and roundhouse. The locomotive repair facility closed in the 1930s, soon after the 1926 designation of U.S. Route 66 in the area. The Eagle D-X station opened in 1933 and has sold various brands of fuel under different owners over the years. In its 1940s heyday, it was one of three stations in a four-block section of US 66. A 1981 photo shows the station as a tin-roof structure with three modern D-X fuel pumps in the forecourt.

The town depended on Route 66 as its economic lifeblood until the construction of Interstate 44 in Oklahoma in 1957 sent the community into decline. Various motels and cafés closed their doors forever; the Buffalo Ranch Trading Post closed upon its owner Aleene Albro's demise in 1997 and was demolished in 2002.

Laurel and David Kane purchased the former D-X station in 1999 to be restored and used to house an existing Packard memorabilia collection. The once-vibrant town, long bypassed by the Interstate highway system, had been reduced to 800 people and a handful of local stores.

"I knew I wanted a property on Route 66 — that was one of the reasons for living here. We kept driving through Afton to get here and there. There were about three vintage stations still standing... We really liked (this one) because it was in (better) condition than the others, and it had room for the cars."

— Laurel Kane

Afton Station was recognised as the "Route 66 Business of the Year" at the 2009 International Route 66 Festival in Flagstaff, Arizona.

Following the deaths of Laurel Kane in 2016, and that of David Kane in 2018, Afton Station's collection of Packards and other memorabilia were sold. According to the station's website, the property is expected to be sold in a public auction scheduled for June 29, 2019.

== See also ==
- America's Packard Museum in Dayton, Ohio
