= Goodman Brothers and Hinlein Company =

- U.S. National Register of Historic Places
- U.S. Historic district – Contributing property
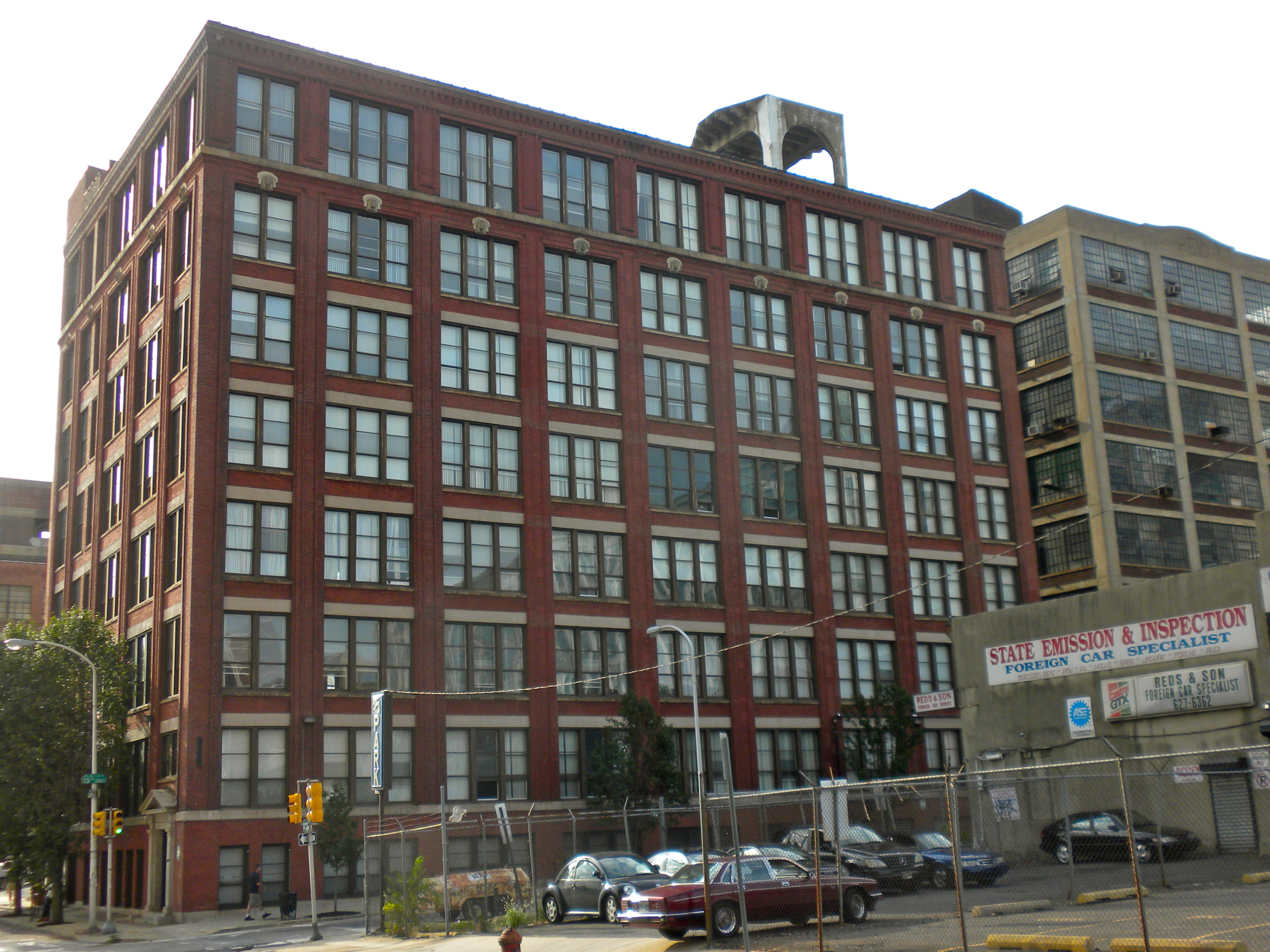
- Goodman Brothers and Hinlein Company, August 2010

- Location within Philadelphia Location within Pennsylvania Location within the United States
- Location: 1238 Callowhill St., Philadelphia, Pennsylvania
- Coordinates: 39°57′32″N 75°9′37″W
- Area: 0.3 acres (0.12 ha)
- Built: 1909; 117 years ago
- Architect: Ballinger & Perrot
- NRHP reference No.: 85000469
- Added to NRHP: March 7, 1985

The Goodman Brothers and Hinlein Company is an historic factory building which is located at 1238 Callowhill Street in the Callowhill neighborhood of Philadelphia, Pennsylvania.

It is a contributing property to the Callowhill Industrial Historic District, and was added to the National Register of Historic Places in 1985.

== History and architectural features ==
Built in 1909, this historic structure is an eight-story, nine-bay, reinforced concrete building with brick facing. It previously housed a dress trimmings company, lithographic printing company, and a warehouse.

Currently known as Beaux Arts Lofts, 1238 Callowhill Street also has the distinction of being the first building in this old industrial zone to become a residential living space, and in 1995 to be converted into a condominium, once again setting the pace for what was to become "The Loft District."
