= Smaltz Building =

- U.S. National Register of Historic Places
- U.S. Historic district – Contributing property
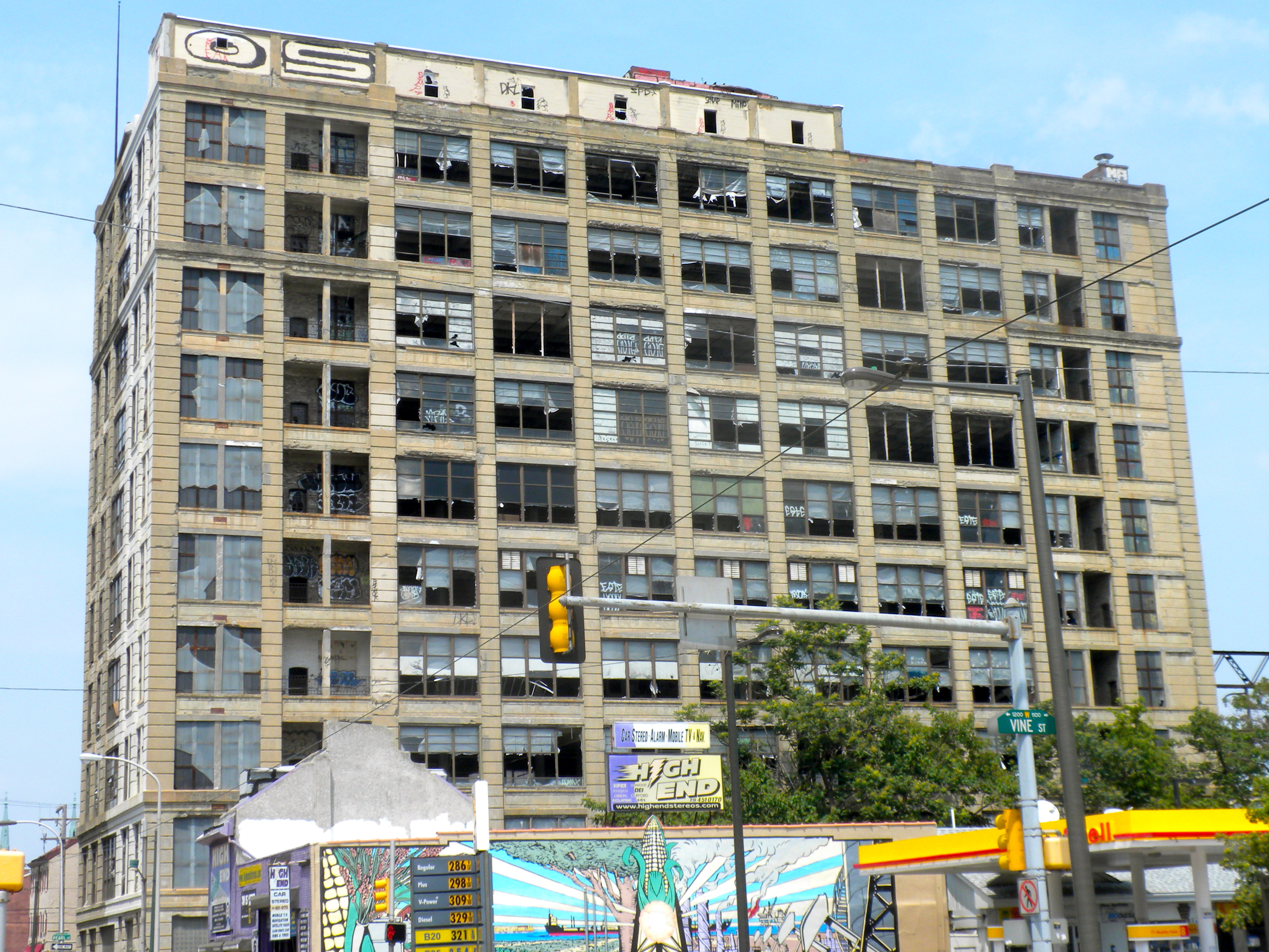
- Smaltz Building, May 2010

- Location within Philadelphia Location within Pennsylvania Location within the United States
- Location: 315 N. 12th St., Philadelphia, Pennsylvania
- Coordinates: 39°57′35″N 75°9′30″W
- Area: less than one acre
- Built: 1911
- Architect: Ballinger & Perrot; Turner Concrete Steel Construction
- Architectural style: Early Commercial
- NRHP reference No.: 05000759
- Added to NRHP: July 27, 2005

The Smaltz Building, also known as the Smaltz-Goodwin Building, is an historic factory building in the Callowhill neighborhood of Philadelphia, Pennsylvania, United States.

Added to the National Register of Historic Places in 2005, it is a contributing property to the Callowhill Industrial Historic District.

== History and architectural features ==
Built in 1911, this historic structure is a ten-story, eleven-bay by five-bay, reinforced concrete building. It originally housed the Smaltz-Goodwin women's shoe manufacturer until 1933 and was then home to a variety of clothing manufacturers.

Between 2012 and 2016 the Post Brothers development company rehabbed the Smaltz Building into the first LEED Gold certified residential high-rise in Philadelphia, opening the building as The Goldtex apartment community in January 2016.

== Gallery ==
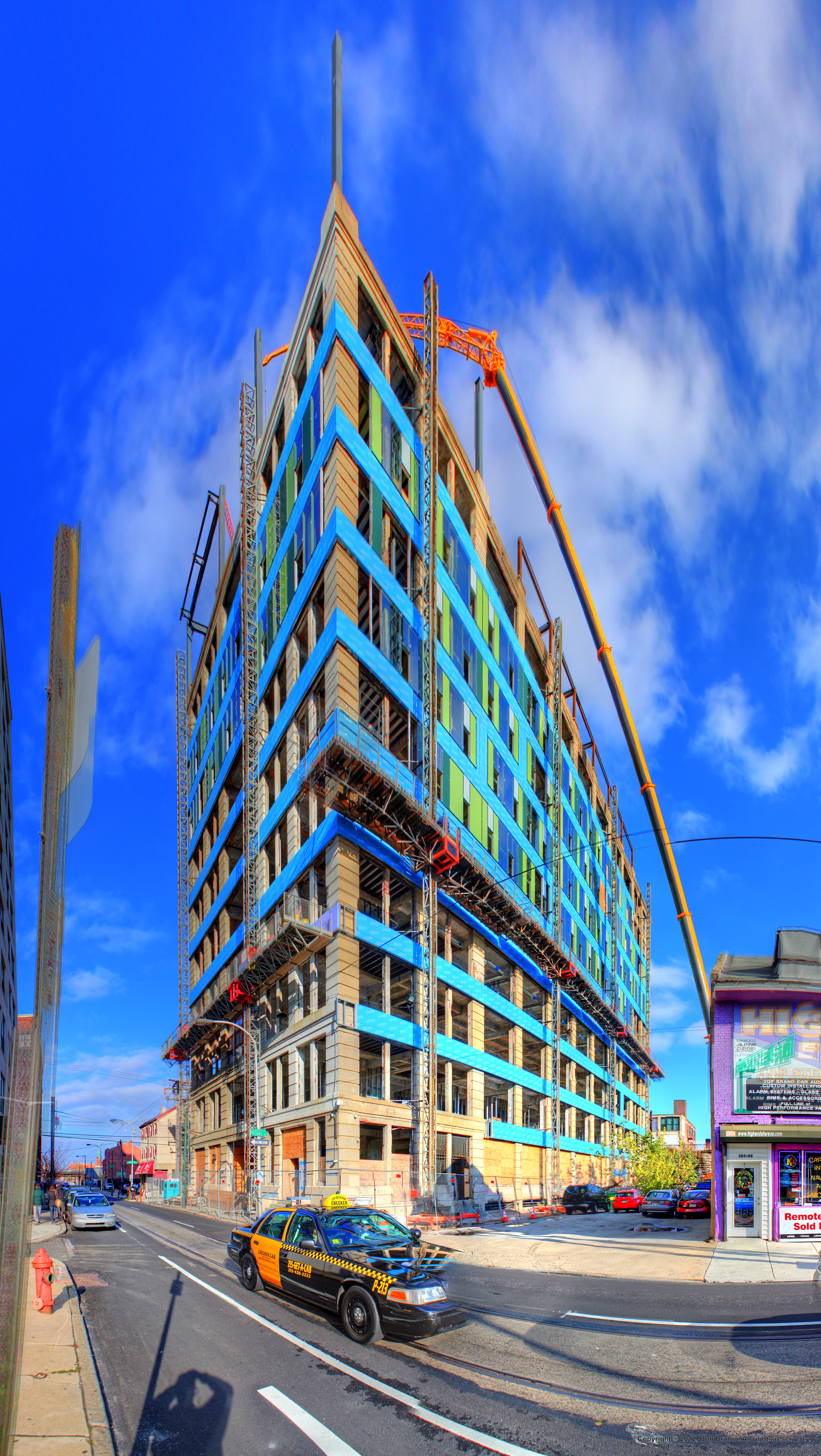
Smaltz Building, early rehabilitation stage by Post Brothers
