= Terminal Commerce Building =

- U.S. National Register of Historic Places
- U.S. Historic district – Contributing property
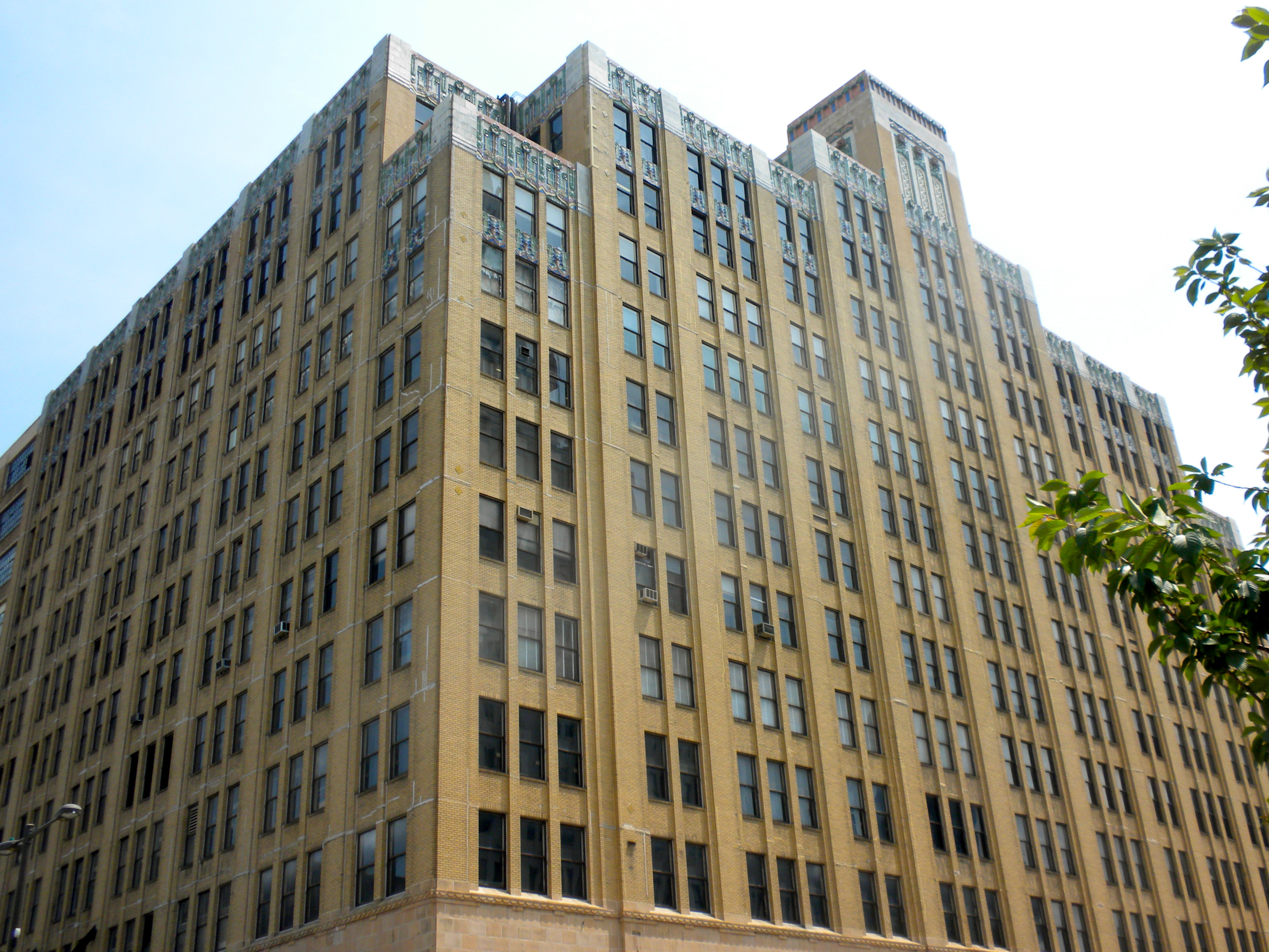
- Terminal Commerce Building, May 2010

- Location within Philadelphia Location within Pennsylvania Location within the United States
- Location: 401 N. Broad St., Philadelphia, Pennsylvania
- Coordinates: 39°57′35″N 75°9′18″W
- Area: 2.7 acres (1.1 ha)
- Built: 1929
- Architect: Steele, William & Sons Co.
- Architectural style: Art Deco
- NRHP reference No.: 96001203
- Added to NRHP: October 24, 1996

The Terminal Commerce Building, also known as the North American Building, is a historic American building complex that is located in the Callowhill neighborhood of Philadelphia, Pennsylvania.

Added to the National Register of Historic Places in 1996, it is a contributing property to the Callowhill Industrial Historic District.

== History and architectural features ==
Built between 1929 and 1931 by the Reading Company, this historic complex is a combined office building, showroom, parking garage, warehouse, and freight station with more than 1.3 million square feet. It measures 528 feet by 225 feet.

The front section houses offices, and is a fourteen-story, reinforced concrete, brick and terra cotta-faced building that was designed in the Art Deco style. The front facade has a central tower with terra cotta ornamentation that houses water tanks. The rear warehouse section is twelve stories tall and is H-shaped.

It was added to the National Register of Historic Places in 1996. It is a contributing property to the Callowhill Industrial Historic District.

Today, the building serves as one of the largest interconnection and colocation facilities on the east coast of the United States. The property was acquired by Netrality Properties in March 2014, and is considered the most fiber-dense, network-neutral facility between New York and Virginia.
