= Alcalde (disambiguation) =

Alcalde is the Spanish title for a mayor or chief administrator of a town. It may also refer to:

== People ==
- Alcalde (surname)

== Places ==
- Alcalde, Kentucky, an unincorporated community in the United States
- Alcalde, New Mexico, a census-designated place in the United States
- Alcalde Díaz, a town in Panama
- Larraín Alcalde, a village in Chile
- Parque Alcalde, a park in Guadalajara, Mexico

== Titles ==
- Alcalde mayor, a regional magistrate in the colonial Spanish Americas
- Alcalde ordinario, an administrative magistrate in the colonial Spanish Americas
- Alcalde-Presidente, a mayor who also functions as chief administrator of a higher level of government
- Alcalde de la Santa Hermandad, a military and judicial magistrate in the colonial Spanish Americas

== Other uses ==
- Alcalde (restaurant), in Guadalajara, Mexico
- The Alcalde, an American magazine for alumni of the University of Texas at Austin
- Alcalde and Fay, an American lobbying firm

== See also ==
- Kadi (disambiguation)
- Kazi (disambiguation)
