= Packard Motor Car Showroom and Storage Facility =

Historic commercial building in New York, United States

- U.S. National Register of Historic Places
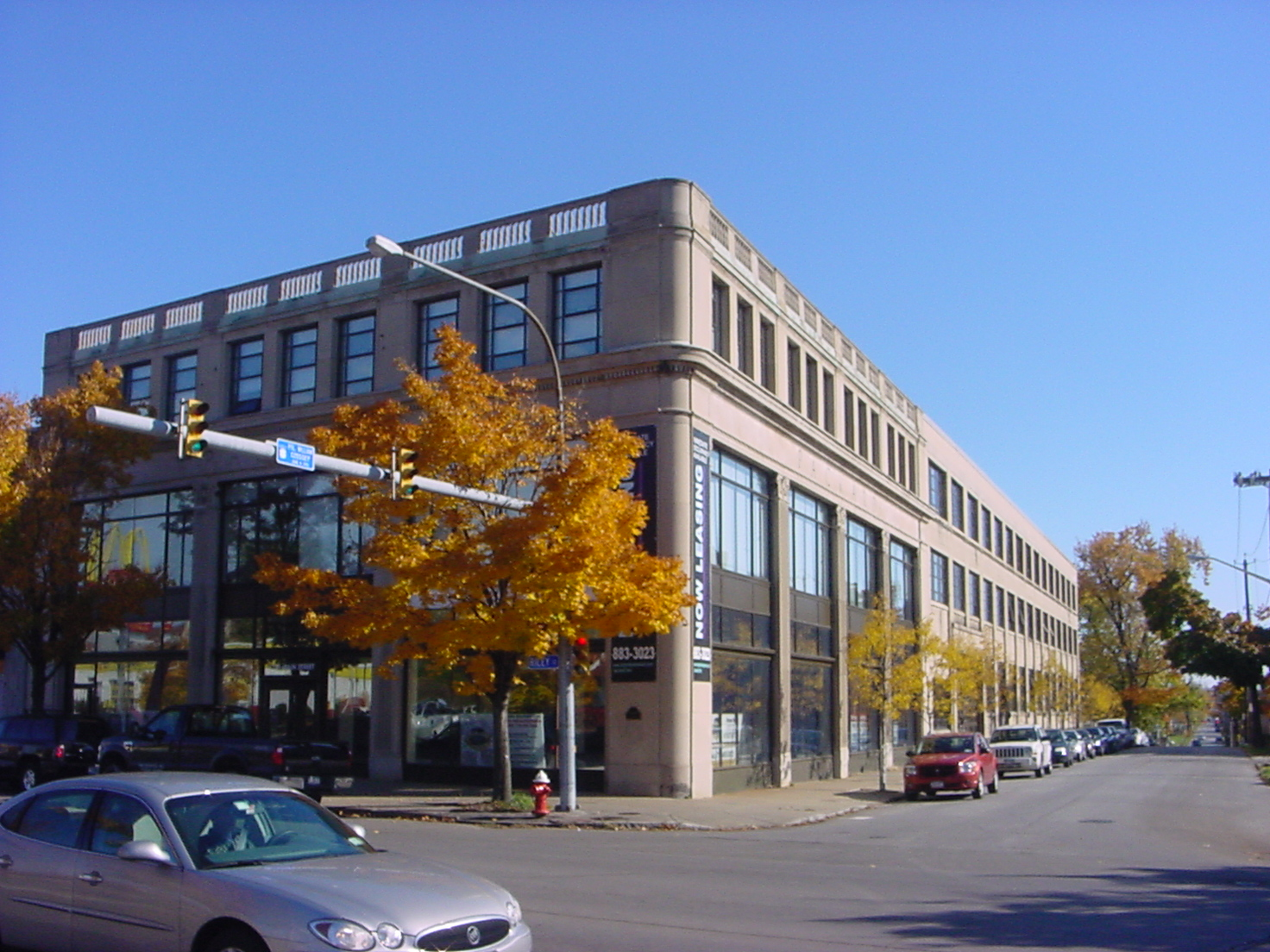

- Location within New York Location within the United States
- Location: 1325 Main St., Buffalo, New York
- Coordinates: 42°54′35″N 78°51′59″W
- Built: 1927
- Architect: Kahn, Albert
- Architectural style: Classical Revival
- NRHP reference No.: 06000561
- Added to NRHP: July 14, 2006

Packard Motor Car Showroom and Storage Facility is a historic automobile showroom located at Buffalo in Erie County, New York. It is a three-story, reinforced concrete frame structure with restrained Neo-classical detailing. It was designed by Albert Kahn in about 1926 and served as a Packard dealership for 30 years.

It was listed on the National Register of Historic Places in 2006.

== See also ==
- Packard Motor Car Dealership (Dayton, Ohio)
- Packard Motor Car Dealership (Philadelphia)
