= Packard Motor Corporation Building =

Historic office building in Pennsylvania, United States

- Packard Motor Car Company Building
- U.S. National Register of Historic Places
- U.S. Historic district – Contributing property
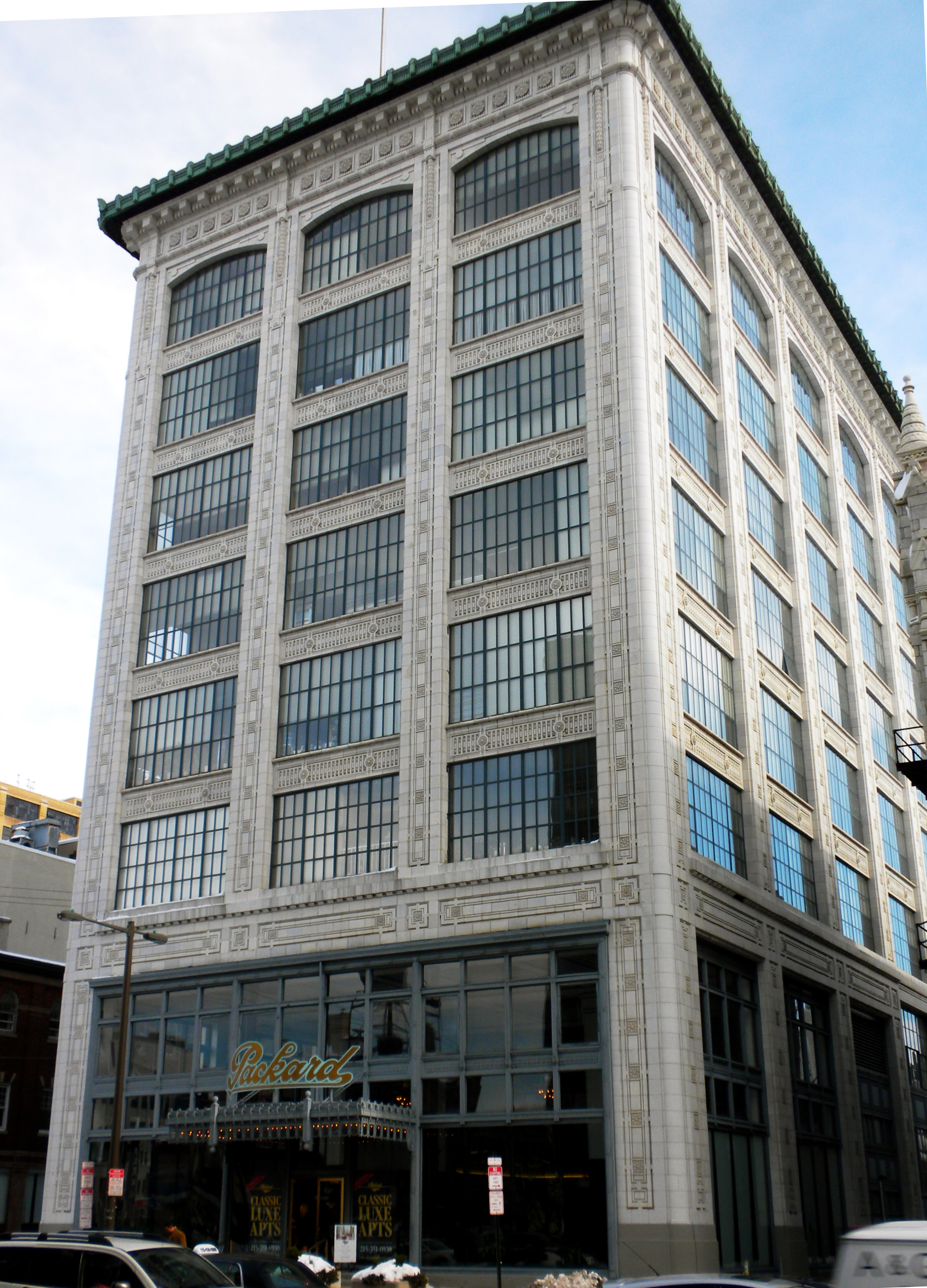
- (February 2010)

- Location within Philadelphia Location within Pennsylvania Location within the United States
- Location: 319 N. Broad Street; Philadelphia, Pennsylvania
- Coordinates: 39°57′31″N 75°9′45″W
- Built: 1910–1911
- Architect: Albert Kahn
- Architectural style: Chicago, skyscraper
- NRHP reference No.: 80003616
- Added to NRHP: February 8, 1980

The Packard Motor Car Company Building, also known as the Press Building, is an historic office building at 319 North Broad Street between Pearl and Wood Streets in the Callowhill neighborhood of Philadelphia, Pennsylvania, United States.

A contributing property to the Callowhill Industrial Historic District, it was added to the National Register of Historic Places in 1980.

== History and architectural features ==
Built between 1910 and 1911, this historic structure was designed by Albert Kahn of the noted Detroit architectural firm of Kahn & Wilby. It is a nine-story, steel-framed, reinforced concrete building; its construction involved one of the first uses of that material in a commercial building. Clad in terra cotta and featuring an ornamented canopy and a prominent overhanging roof, the building housed a showroom and new car inventory space for the Packard Motor Car Company.

The showroom was remodeled in 1927 by Philip Tyre. In November 1928, the building became the headquarters of the Philadelphia Record newspaper, which it remained until the Record folded during a 1947 strike.

The building was added to the National Register of Historic Places in 1980. It is a contributing property to the Callowhill Industrial Historic District.

The building was renovated into apartments in 1986 by Bower Lewis Thrower and John Milner Associates.

== Gallery ==
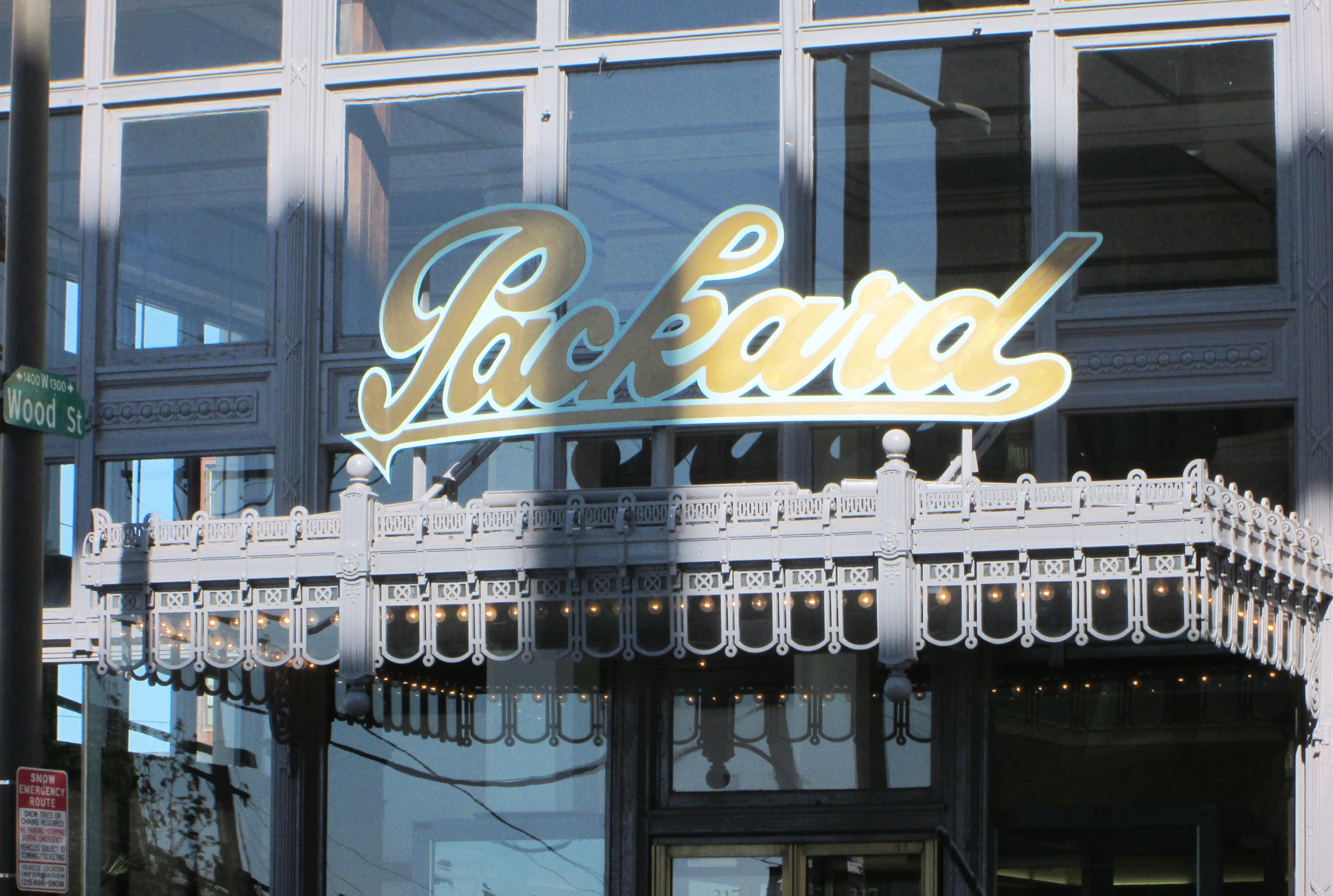
The building's canopy

== See also ==
- Packard Motor Car Dealership (Buffalo, New York)
- Packard Motor Car Dealership (Dayton, Ohio)
