= America's Packard Museum =

Automotive museum in Dayton, Ohio

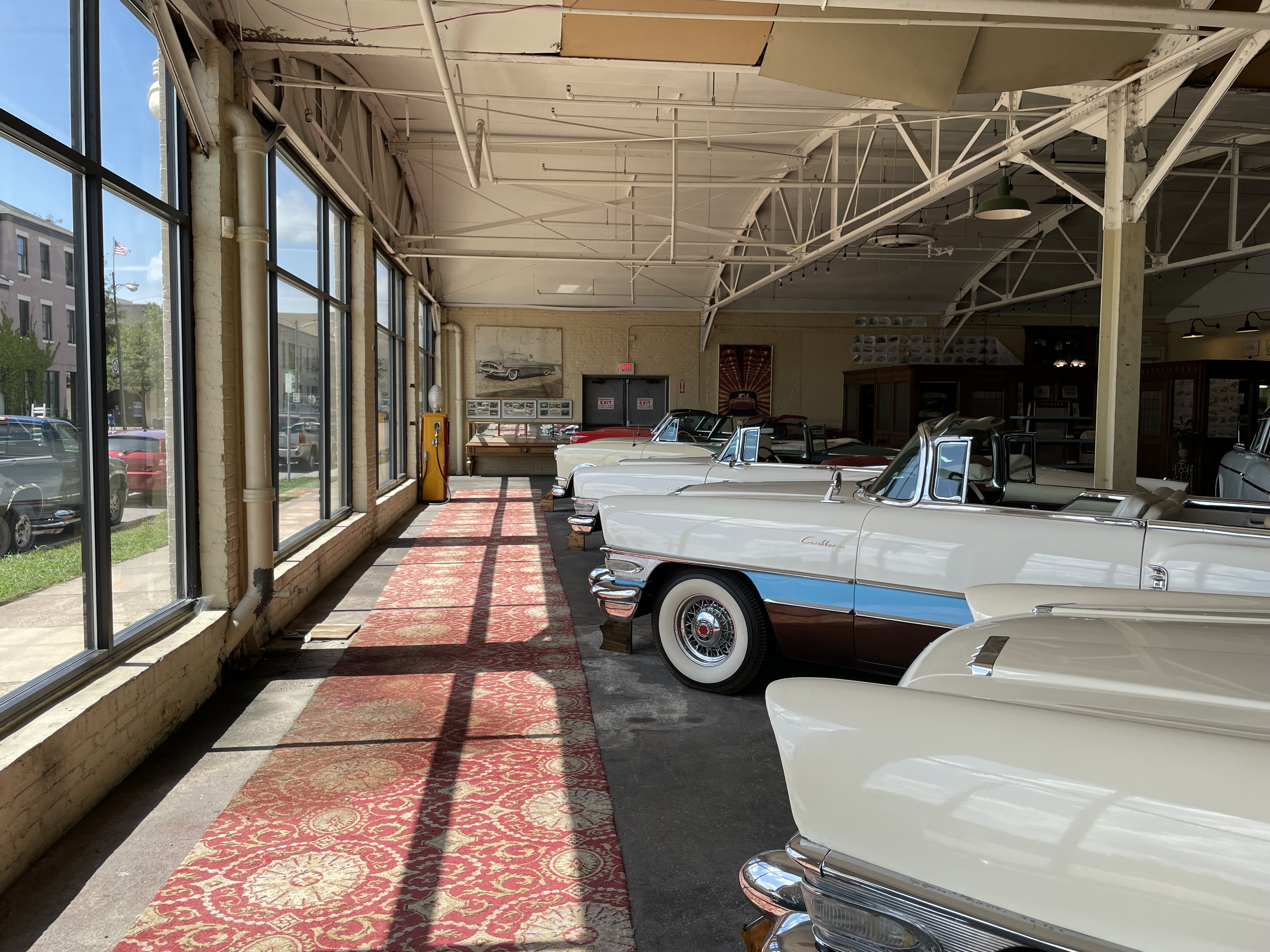
- Cars on display at the museum

- Location within Ohio
- Location: Dayton, Ohio
- Coordinates: 39°45′13″N 84°11′30″W
- Key holdings: Wide collection of Packard Automobiles

America's Packard Museum is an automotive museum located in Dayton, Ohio.

== History ==
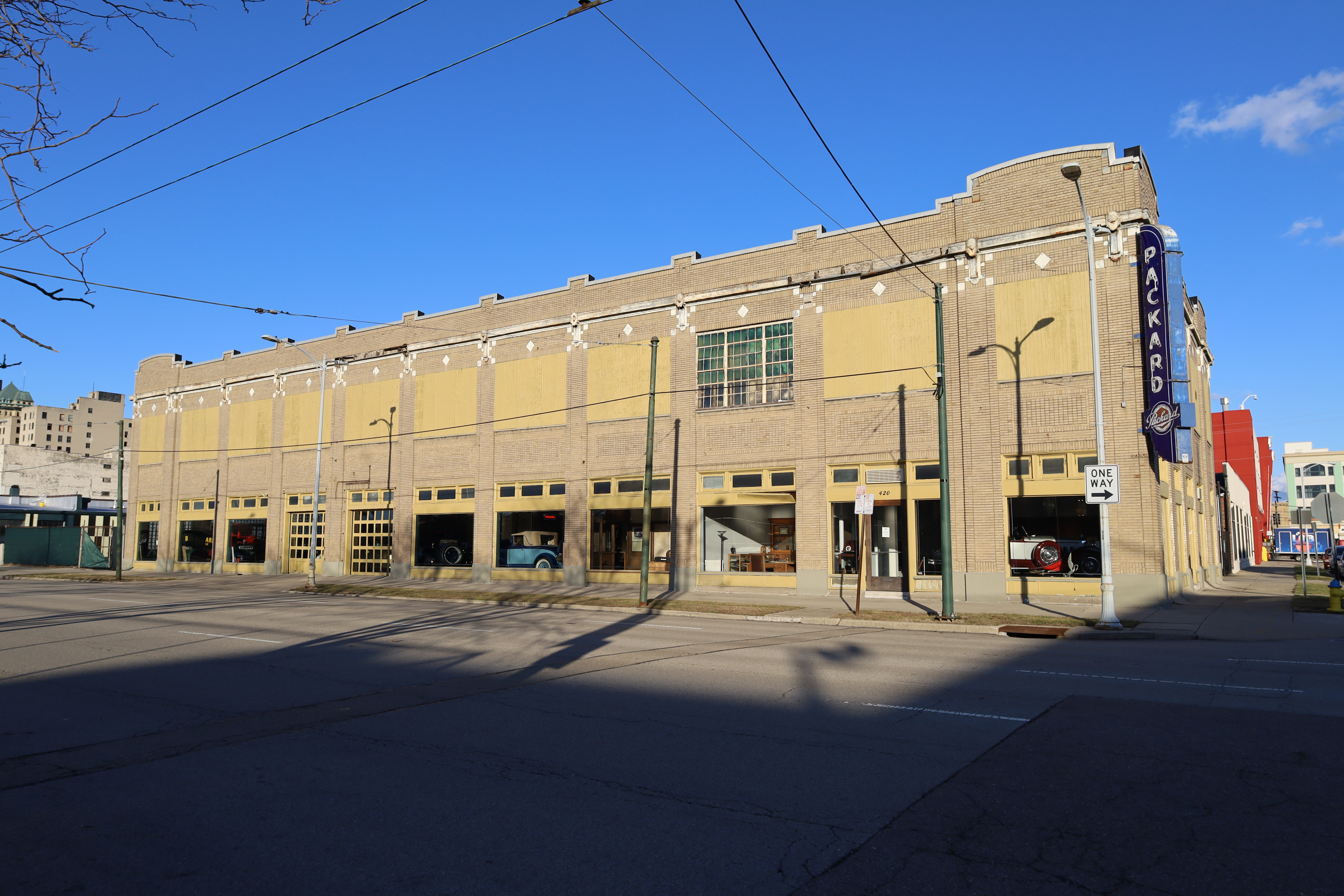
Museum exterior in 2023

The Citizens Motorcar Company, known as America's Packard Museum, is a restored Packard dealership transformed into a museum that displays twentieth-century classic Packards and historic Packard artifacts and memorabilia. Originally, The Citizens Motorcar Company sold Packards in Dayton, Ohio beginning in 1908, and moved into what is now the museum building in 1917. Robert Signom II, the museum's Founder and Curator for 27 years, acquired the building in 1991 and painstakingly rehabilitated it to its original Art Deco grandeur. The original 20' tall porcelain and neon Packard sign, removed from the building in the early 1940s, returned to its former position at the corner of Ludlow and Franklin Streets in 1992 for the grand opening of the museum. Since that time, the museum has grown in size and stature, winning the James Bradley Award of the Society of Automotive Historians in 2004. Car Collector magazine also named the museum one of the "Top Ten" automotive museums in the United States. More than 50 cars are on display, from 1900s Brass Era cars, the streamlined Classic cars of the 1930s and 1940s, to the modern Packards of the 1950s, as well as war machines, parts, accessories, and original sales and service literature. A notable highlight of America's Packard Museum is the original Articles of Incorporation of the Ohio Automobile Company, which later became Packard Motor Car Company. In 2019, Robert Signom III was named Curator to continue the legacy of Packard, and the mission and vision of the museum founded by his father. America's Packard Museum is a Section 501(c)(3) non-profit organization under the Internal Revenue Code.

== See also ==
- Afton Station Packard Museum (Afton, Oklahoma)
- Auburn Cord Duesenberg Automobile Museum
- Packard Motor Car Dealership (Buffalo, New York)
- Packard Motor Car Dealership (Philadelphia)
- Studebaker National Museum
