= Qazi =

Qazi may refer to:

- Qadi (or qazi or kazi), an Islamic magistrate or judge of a shariʿa court
- Qazı, a sausage-like food usually made from horse meat eaten by Turkic or Central Asian ethnic groups
- Qazi, Iran (disambiguation)
- Qazi (name)
- Qazis of Hyderabad, Sindhi community in Pakistan
- Qazi family of Lakhnauti

== See also ==
- Qazi–Markouizos syndrome, rare hereditary condition
- Kazi (disambiguation)
- Kasi (disambiguation)
- Gazi (disambiguation)
