= Callowhill Industrial Historic District =

Historic district in Pennsylvania, United States

- U.S. National Register of Historic Places
- U.S. Historic district
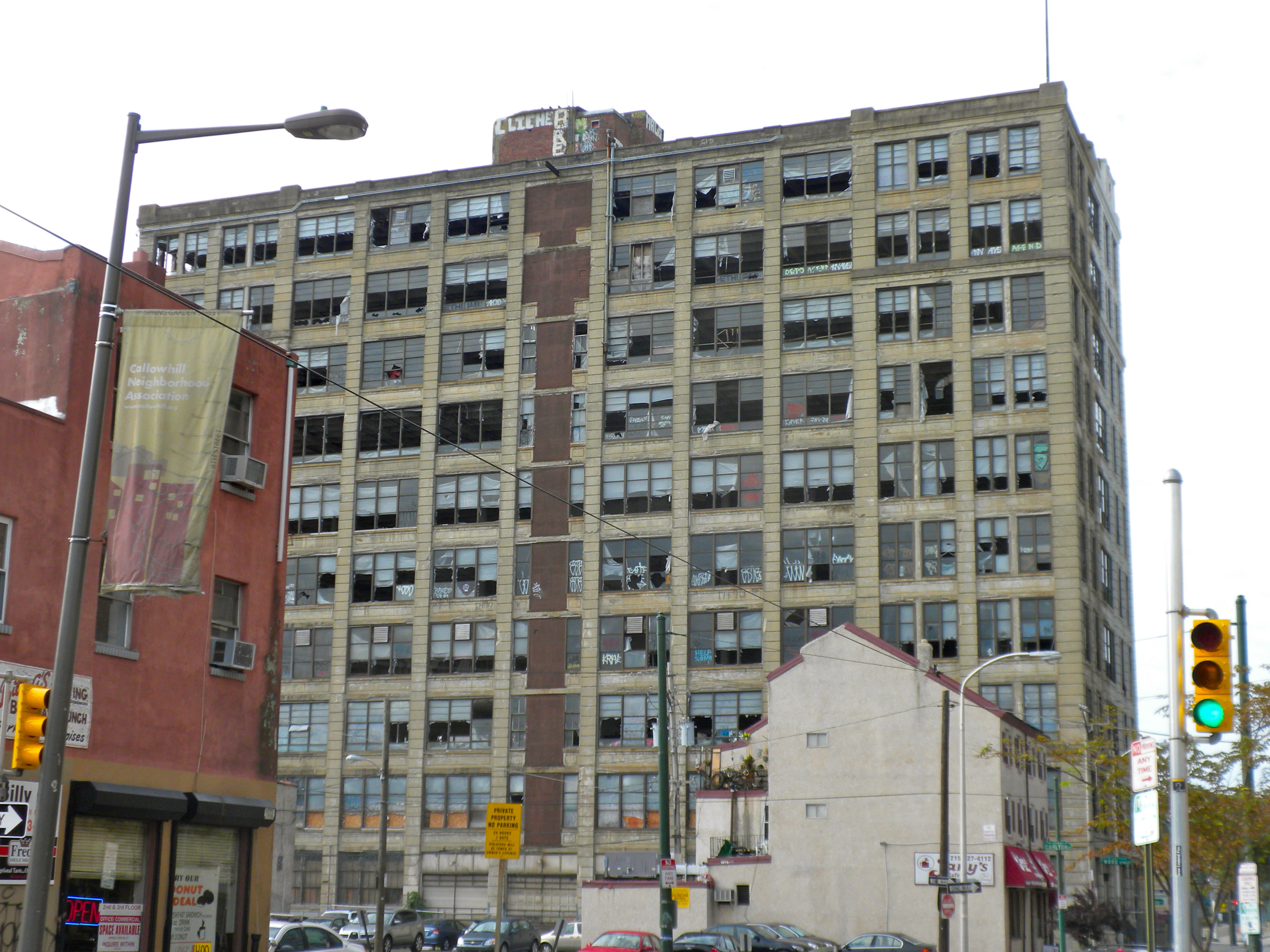
- Wood and 12th, Callowhill Industrial Historic District, August 2010

- Location within Philadelphia Location within Pennsylvania Location within the United States
- Location: Roughly bounded by Pearl St., North Broad St., Hamilton St., and the Reading Railroad Viaduct, Philadelphia, Pennsylvania
- Coordinates: 39°57′35″N 75°09′43″W
- Area: 5.7 acres (2.3 ha)
- Architect: William Steele & Sons; Ballinger & Perrot; Tyre, Philip; Wilson, Joseph; Wilson Brothers & Co.; Kahn, Albert; Stuckert & Co.; Johnson, Philip; Stearns & Castor
- NRHP reference No.: 10000403
- Added to NRHP: June 28, 2010

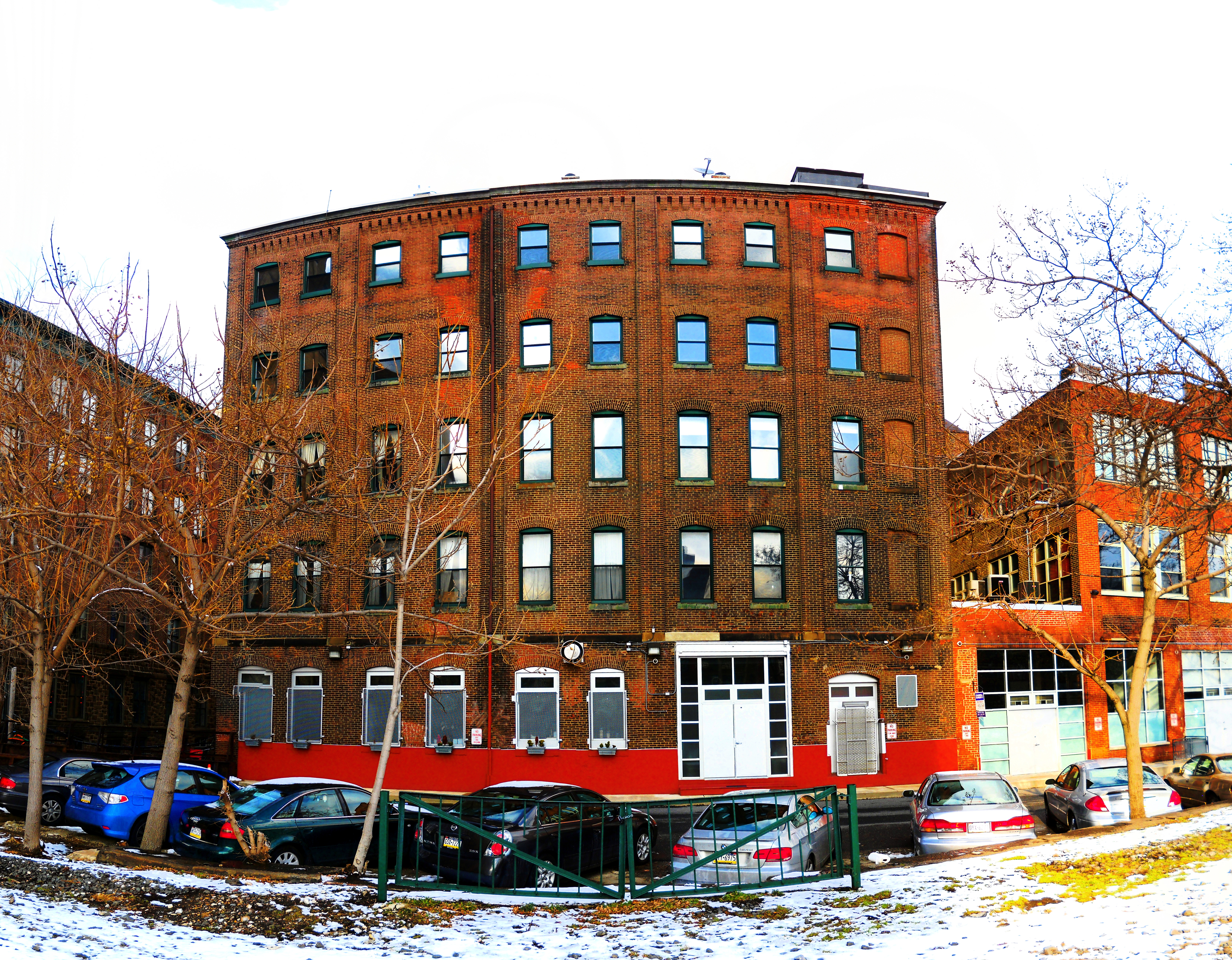
Rebman Building (1903)

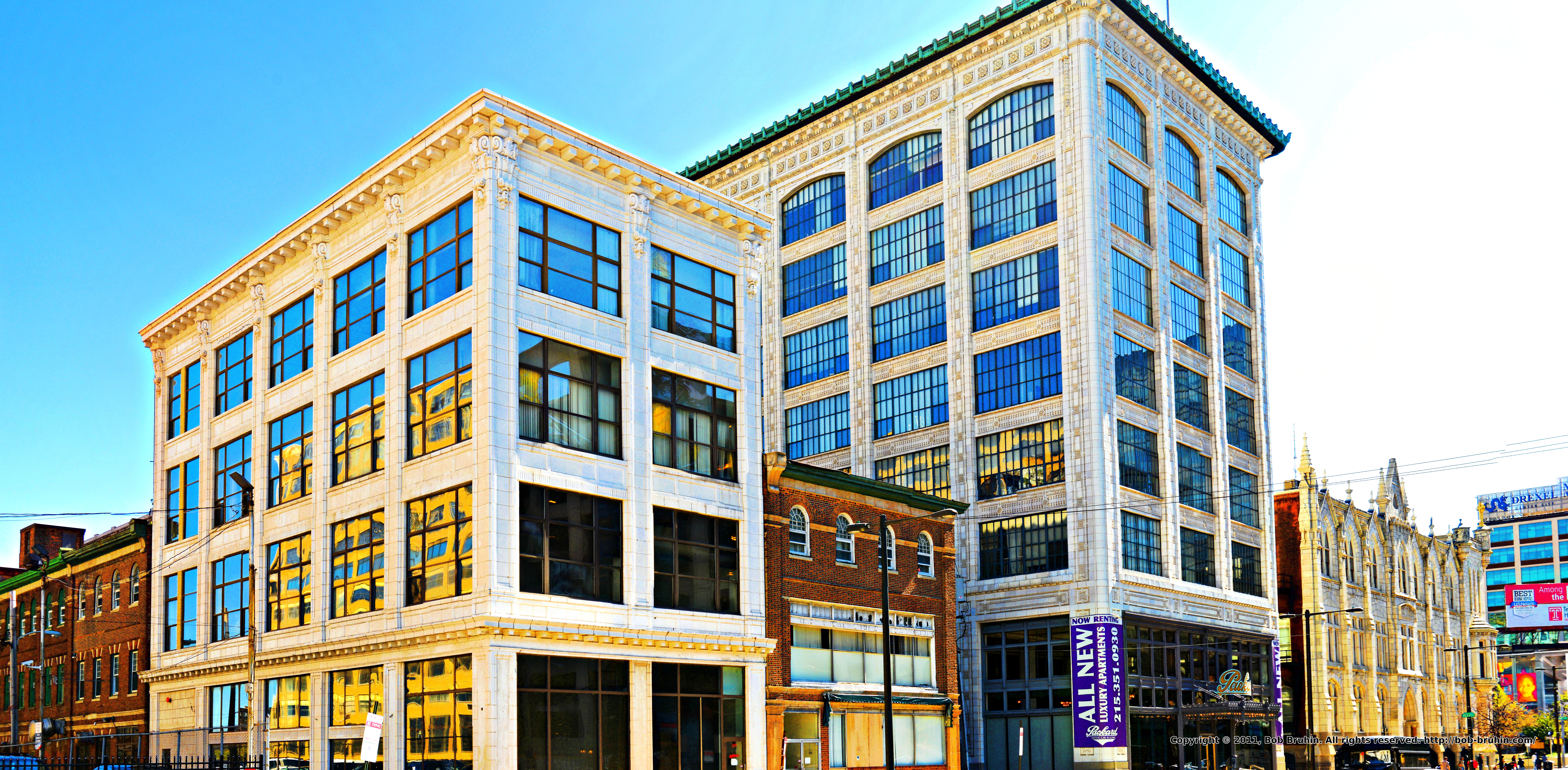
(left to right) U.S. Tire Company Building (1911), Overland Motor Company Building (1910, c. 1940), and the Packard Motor Corporation Building

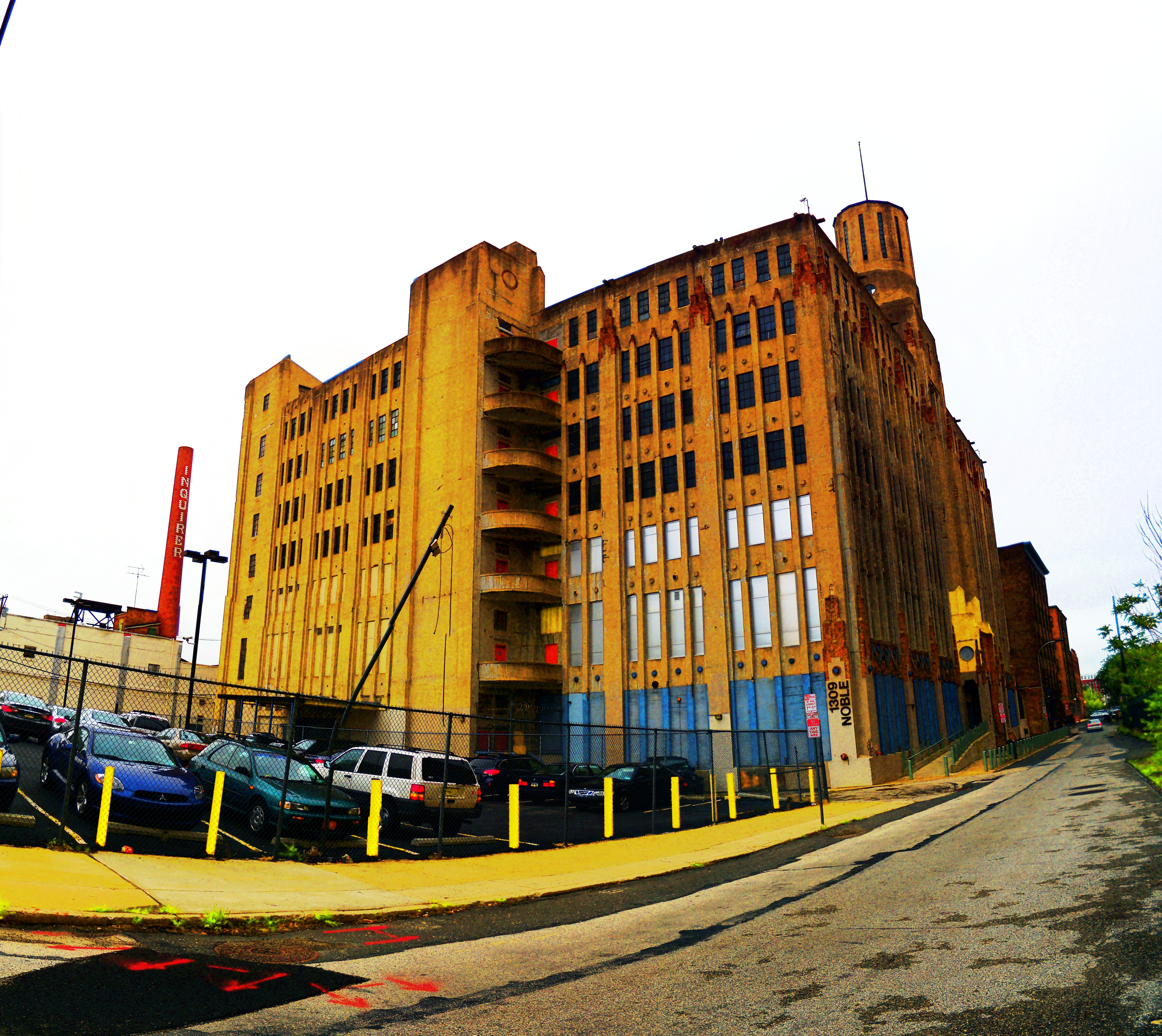
Lasher Building (1927)

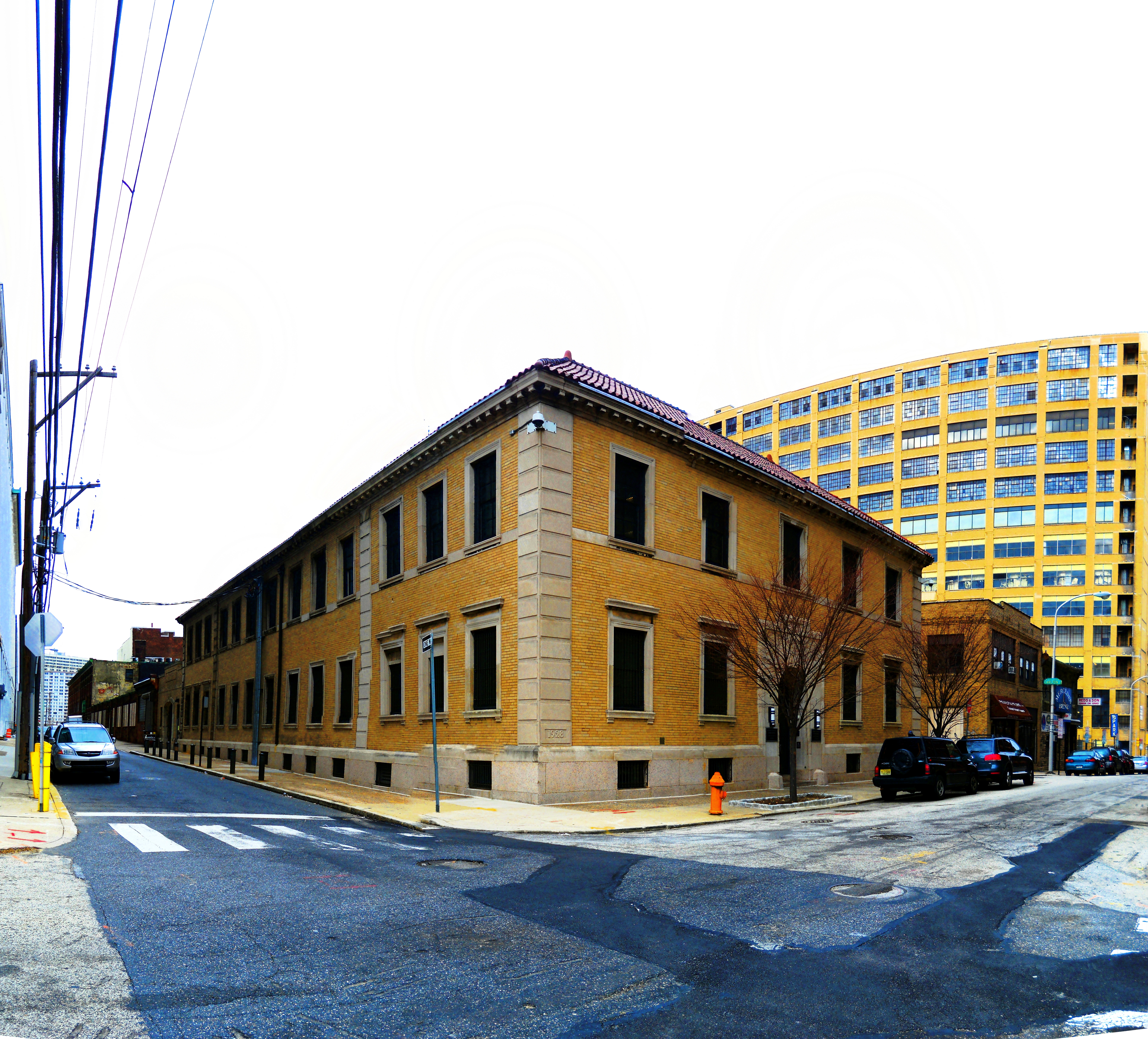
Philadelphia City Morgue (1928)

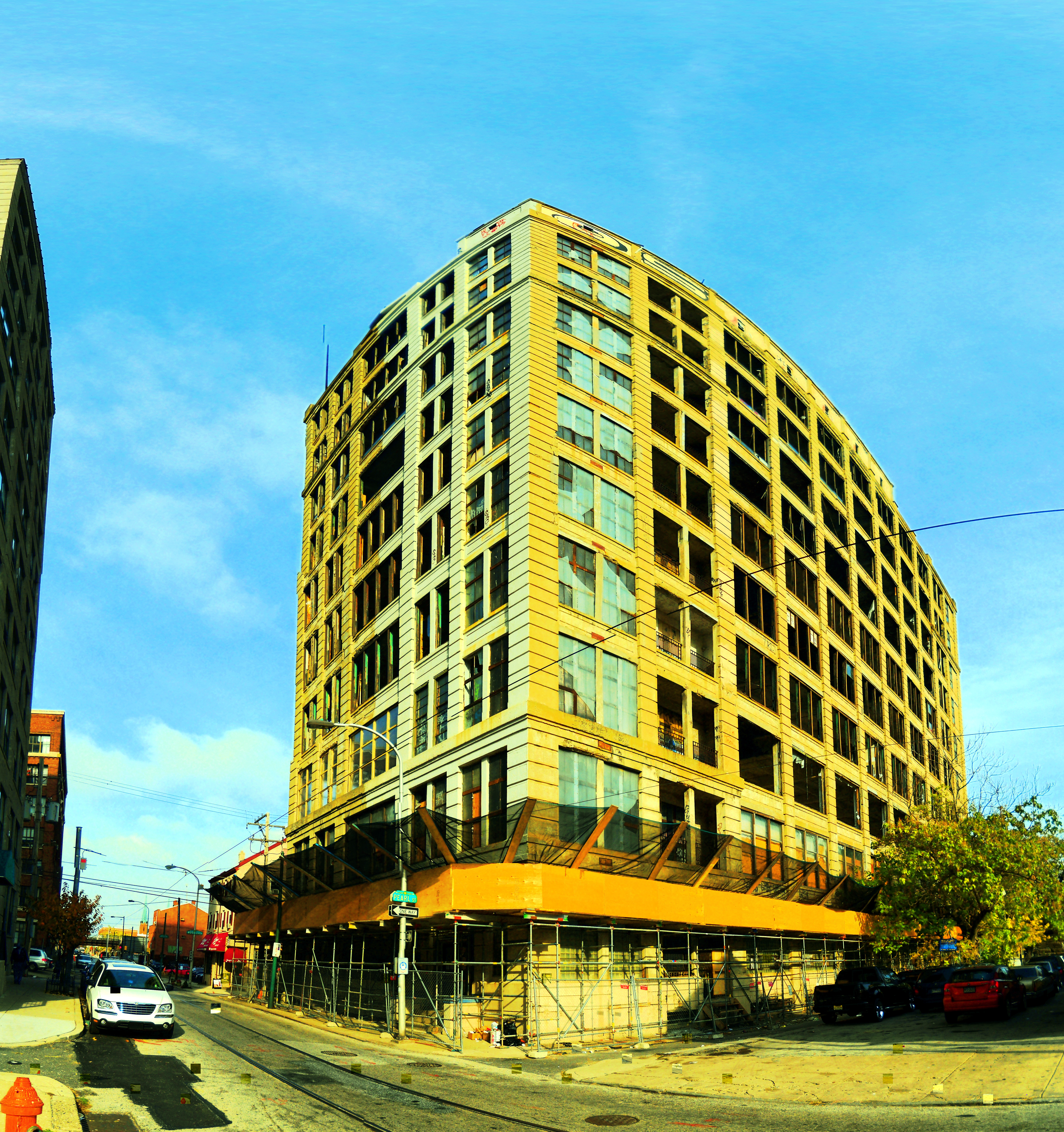
Smaltz Building (1912)

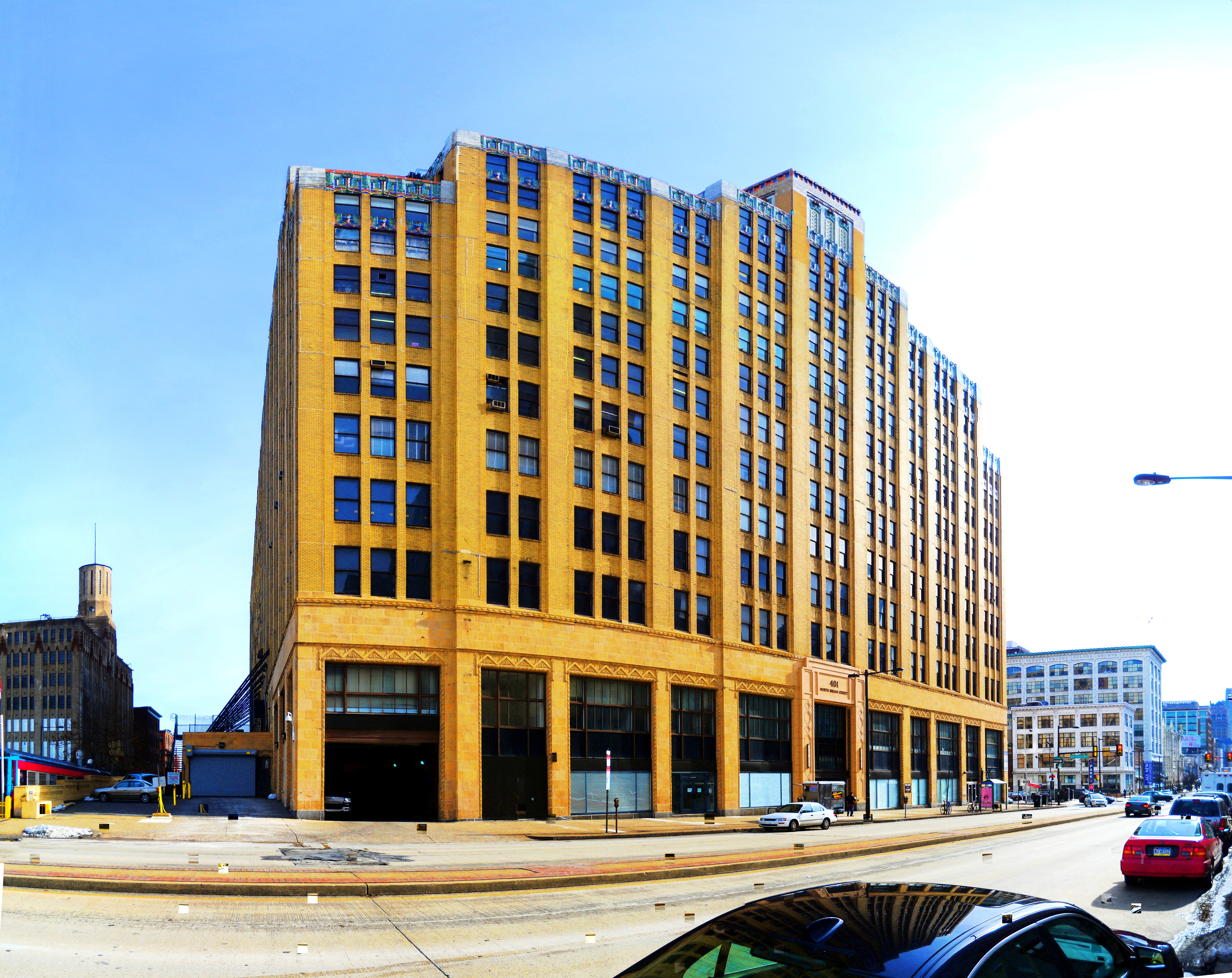
Terminal Commerce Building

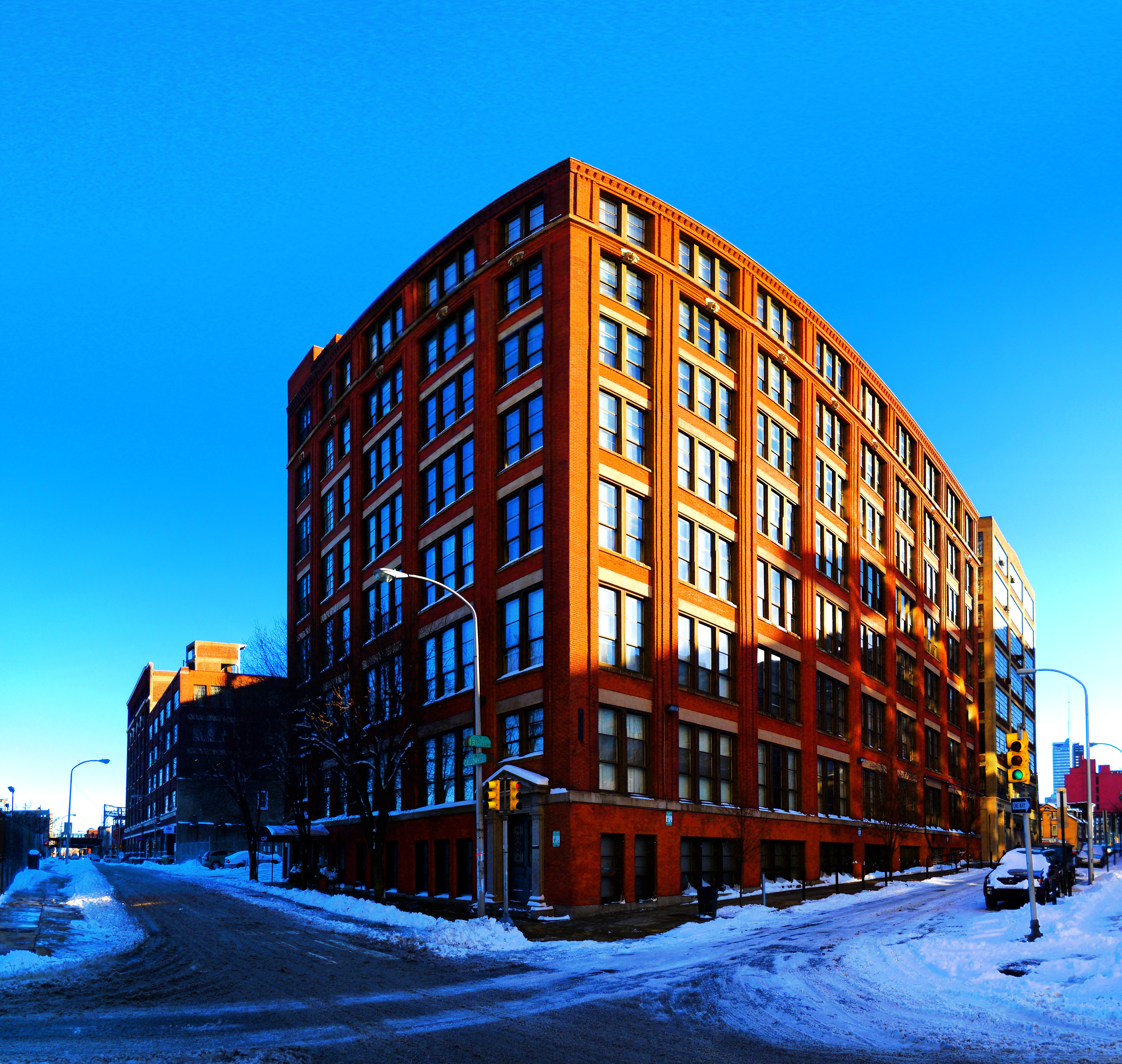
Goodman Brothers and Hinlein Company

Callowhill Industrial Historic District is a national historic district located in the Callowhill neighborhood of Philadelphia, Pennsylvania. It encompasses 31 contributing buildings, 1 contributing site, and 1 contributing structure. The commercial and industrial buildings were mostly built from the 1890s through the 1930s. They range from 4 to 14 stories in height and the exteriors are of brick, concrete, terra cotta, and stone. Most of the buildings are characterized as box-shaped, mid-rise loft buildings with flat roofs. Also in the district are eleven 2 1/2-story brick rowhouses, with the earliest dated to the 1830s. Notable buildings include the Rebman Building (1903), Stewart Cracker Building (c. 1900), U.S. Tire Company Building (1911), Lasher Building (1927), Philadelphia City Morgue (1928), and Overland Motor Company Building (1910, c. 1940). Located in the district and listed separately are the Smaltz Building (1912), Terminal Commerce Building, Goodman Brothers and Hinlein Company, and the Packard Motor Corporation Building.

In 2012 the Overland Motor Company Building was demolished by The Pennsylvania Ballet in order to make room for their planned Louise Reed Center for Dance. In 2018 the U.S. Tire Company Building met with the same fate.

It was added to the National Register of Historic Places in 2010.
