= Gazi, Razavi Khorasan =

Gazi گزي
- Village
- Location within Iran
- Coordinates: 36°23′04″N 59°36′15″E
- Country: Iran
- Province: Razavi Khorasan
- County: Mashhad
- Bakhsh: Central
- Rural District: Tabadkan

Population (2006)
  - Total: 190
- Time zone: UTC+3:30 (IRST)
  - Summer (DST): UTC+4:30 (IRDT)

Gazi (Persian: گزي, also Romanized as Gazī and Gezzī; also known as Gīrī) is a village in Tabadkan Rural District, in the Central District of Mashhad County, Razavi Khorasan Province, Iran. At the 2006 census, its population was 190, in 37 families.
