= David Kazi =

Australian game designer

- Education: University of Adelaide
- Occupations: Game designer business consultant
- Notable work: Hollow Knight; Exo One

David Kazi is an Australian game designer and business consultant who co-founded the indie game studio Ember League, which is developing Bit Awakening. He previously worked on Hollow Knight (2017) and Exo One (2021), being a full-time Team Cherry employee while working on the former.

== Early life and education ==
Kazi received a Bachelor of Computer Science at the University of Adelaide, and a Diploma of Project Management.

== Career ==
Before entering the games industry, Kazi worked at a locally owned Australian internet company, initially in a call center and later in web development, managing the company’s website and building backend systems. He also did freelance graphic design and logo work as a side-gig. Around 2009, he began experimenting with the Unity game engine, which led him to pursue game development.

In 2014, Kazi was employed by Team Cherry, acting as the technical director for their game Hollow Knight. He helped move Hollow Knight over to Unity, as it was then-using the Stencyl engine. In 2018, he left the company after landing a "cushy corporate gig". He later worked on Exo One (2021), helping creator Jay Wetson with programming.

In 2023, founded the indie game studio Ember League, alongside Alan Evans, who he met during his full-time job as a business consultant. Kazi is currently the owner of the studio, and the Creative Director. He is working on the studio's debut game, Bit Awakening, which started development in 2023.
