= Khāṣi language =

Indo-Aryan dialect

Khāṣi
- Native to: India
- Region: Jammu division
- Language family: Indo-European: Indo-Iranian; Indo-Aryan; ? Northern; Western Pahari; Khāṣi

Language codes
- ISO 639-3: –
- Coordinates: 33.228°N 74.804°E

Khāṣi (खाषी) is an Indo-Aryan dialect of Jammu and Kashmir, India. It belongs to the Western Pahari group and is spoken in some of the mountainous areas north of Jammu. It is different from the north-eastern Himalayan dialects of Assam and Meghalya, belonging to the Mon-Khmer Family.

Its area extends on both sides of the river Chenab: to the north this includes the Panj Gabbar region of Ramban district comprising the five valleys of Arnās–Bamhāg, Gool, Gulābgaṛh, Māhore and Budhal. To the south of the Chenab, it is spoken in the Bamhāg-Pancheri block, as well as a number of villages between Arnas and Dubli Gali. Its language neighbours are Kashmiri, Sarazi, Dogri language, Pahari and Bhaderwahi.

The total number of speakers is unknown, but is likely that a substantial proportion of the census figures for "Pahari" in these districts represent speakers of Khāṣi.

== Phonology ==
It shares distinctive sounds with neighbouring dialects like Bhadarwahi involving a combination of a retroflex stop + the lateral l: ṭ͡lai 'three', niḍ͡l 'sleep', These often correspond to clusters of a consonant + r in the ancestor language (compare the Sanskrit equivalents of the above two words: trīṇi-, nidrā-)

== Bibliography ==
- Kaul, Pritam Krishen (2006). Pahāṛi and Other Tribal Dialects of Jammu. Vol. 1. Delhi: Eastern Book Linkers. ISBN 8178541017.
