= Cadys =

Prince of ancient Lydia

Cadys (Kadys) was a possibly legendary prince of ancient Lydia.

According to the fragments of Nicolaus of Damascus, possibly based on the lost history of Xanthus of Lydia, the Lydian king Alyattes, of the Mermnadae dynasty, had left his kingdom jointly to his twin sons, Cadys and Ardys. Cadys soon died and his brother ascended the throne as Ardys in 795 BC after an interregnum of civil conflict.
