= Cadi (Phrygia) =

City of ancient Mysia

Coordinates: 38°59′27″N 29°23′31″E

Cadi or Kadoi (Ancient Greek: Κάδοι) was a city of ancient Mysia according to Stephanus of Byzantium, or of Phrygia Epictetius according to Strabo. It was inhabited during Hellenistic, Roman, and Byzantine times. The coins of Cadi bear the ethnic name Καδοηνων; and the river Hermus is represented on them. Cadi may be the place which Propertius calls "Mygdonii Cadi." It was afterwards an episcopal see, in ecclesiastic province of Phrygia Pacatiana. No longer a residential bishopric, it remains a titular see of the Roman Catholic Church.

Its site is located near Gediz, Kütahya in Asiatic Turkey.
