= Kadi, Central African Republic =

Kadi
- Location in Central African Republic
- Coordinates: 7°5′25″N 18°21′7″E
- Country: Central African Republic
- Prefecture: Ouham-Fafa
- Sub-prefecture: Batangafo
- Commune: Ouassi

Kadi is a village situated in Ouham-Fafa Prefecture, Central African Republic.

== History ==
Due to the killing of a Fulani in Kadi, the village was attacked in April 2013. During the attack, the Fulani militias looted civilian belongings and killed one civilian. On the next day, Séléka visited Kadi and burned 88 houses. FPRC attacked Kadi and torched the village on 15 January 2015.

== Education ==
Kadi has one school.
