= Qazi, Garmkhan =

Qazi قاضي
- Village
- Location within Iran
- Coordinates: 37°28′27″N 57°33′32″E
- Country: Iran
- Province: North Khorasan
- County: Bojnord
- Bakhsh: Garmkhan
- Rural District: Garmkhan

Population (2006)
  - Total: 443
- Time zone: UTC+3:30 (IRST)
  - Summer (DST): UTC+4:30 (IRDT)

Qazi (Persian: قاضي, also Romanized as Qāẕī; also known as Gazī) is a village in Garmkhan Rural District, Garmkhan District, Bojnord County, North Khorasan Province, Iran. At the 2006 census, its population was 443, in 102 families.
