= Abd al-Majeed al-Qadi =

Yemeni playwright and writer (born 1934)

Abd al-Majeed al-Qadi (Arabic: عبد المجيد القاضي; born 1934) is a Yemeni playwright and writer. His work is notable for its engagement with social problems that afflict Yemen. His first two plays were called Al-Daudahi's Daughter and Young Man Mansour. His short story, "The Final Ring", has been translated into English and appeared in a 1988 anthology on modern Arabian literature (edited by Salma Khadra Jayyusi).
