= Catie =

Catie is a given name. Notable people with the name include:

- Catie Ball (born 1951), American Olympic swimmer
- Catie Curtis (born 1965), American singer-songwriter
- Catie Lazarus (1976–2020), American writer, storyteller and talk show host
- Catie Munnings (born 1997), British rally driver
- Catie Rosemurgy, American poet

== See also ==
- Katie
- Katherine
