= Hassan Al Qadhi =

Qatari footballer (born 1983)

Personal information
- Full name: Hassan Abdullah Al Qadhi
- Date of birth: 8 November 1983 (age 43)
- Place of birth: Qatar
- Position: Midfielder

Senior career*
Years	Team	Apps	(Gls)
2003–2014	Al-Wakra		
2014–2015	Al-Ahli		
2015–2018	Al-Wakra		
- * Club domestic league appearances and goals

Hassan Al Qadhi (Arabic: حسن القاضي; born 8 November 1983) is a Qatari footballer.
