= Kady =

Kady is a given name. Notable people with the name include:

- Kady Brownell
- Kady Dandeneau, Canadian wheelchair basketball player
- Kady Iuri Borges Malinowski, Brazilian footballer
- Kady Malloy
- Kady MacDonald Denton
- Kady McDermott
- Kady O'Malley

== See also ==
- Cady (given name)
- Kadi (name)
- Cadi (disambiguation)
