= Gazi Zehi =

Gazi Zehi گزي زهي
- Village
- Location within Iran
- Coordinates: 25°46′18″N 60°59′04″E
- Country: Iran
- Province: Sistan and Baluchestan
- County: Qasr-e Qand
- Bakhsh: Talang
- Rural District: Talang

Population (2006)
  - Total: 90
- Time zone: UTC+3:30 (IRST)
  - Summer (DST): UTC+4:30 (IRDT)

Gazi Zehi (Persian: گزي زهي, also Romanized as Gazī Zehī; also known as Gaze’ī-ye Pā’īn, Gazezai, Gazī, Gaz’ī-ye Pā’īn, Gazo’ī Pā‘īn, Qārezā’ī, Qāzeh Zā’ī, Qāzeh Zāy, and Qazo‘ī Pā‘īn) is a village in Talang Rural District, Talang District, Qasr-e Qand County, Sistan and Baluchestan Province, Iran. At the 2006 census, its population was 90, in 26 families.
