= Career and Academic Development Institute =

Coordinates: 39.957907°N 75.159004°W

Career and Academic Development Institute (CADI)

Location
- 444 N. 3rd Street, 4th floor Philadelphia, Pennsylvania, 19123

Information
- Type: Public School/Non-profit collaboration
- Established: 2004
- Principal: Dana Rapoport
- Enrollment: 150
- Uniforms: Dark blue or black pants, Light blue shirt with CADI logo
- Phone: 215-567-2410

The Career and Academic Development Institute (CADI), opened its doors on September 7, 2004, and is an accelerated alternative high school located in Philadelphia, Pennsylvania. The school was developed as a cooperative effort between OIC of America, a non-profit organization, designated to serve the community with the mantra of "Helping people help themselves", (founded by the late Rev. Leon Sullivan) and the School District of Philadelphia. The school provides transitional services both academic and developmental to a myriad of students of diverse backgrounds, with many being from low income and underserved communities. CADI services students ages 17–21, who have been absent from traditional high school for at least six months.

The Career and Academic Development Institute's curriculum is parallel with the Philadelphia school district's high school standards of learning. CADI was uniquely designed to assist students by providing several different program options that may fit students scheduling needs, which include year-round sessions during the day. Students also earn credits through computer assisted instruction when appropriate although the program is mostly a live instruction model. Along with Program Director C. Benjamin Lattimore and Principal Dana Rapoport, the Career and Academic Development Institute has a dynamic team of instructors, case managers, development specialists, and administrative support staff.

Eligibility Requirements: Individual must be between the ages of 16 and 21 and either (a) enrolled in a Philadelphia School District school, but has failed to earn a significant number of credits towards graduation (b) has previously dropped out of school; or (c) who is returning from an adjudicated court placement.

== See also ==
- New measures tackle dropouts
- How Twelve Communities are Reconnecting Out of School Youth
