= Kady, Gmina Grodzisk Mazowiecki =

Kady
- Village
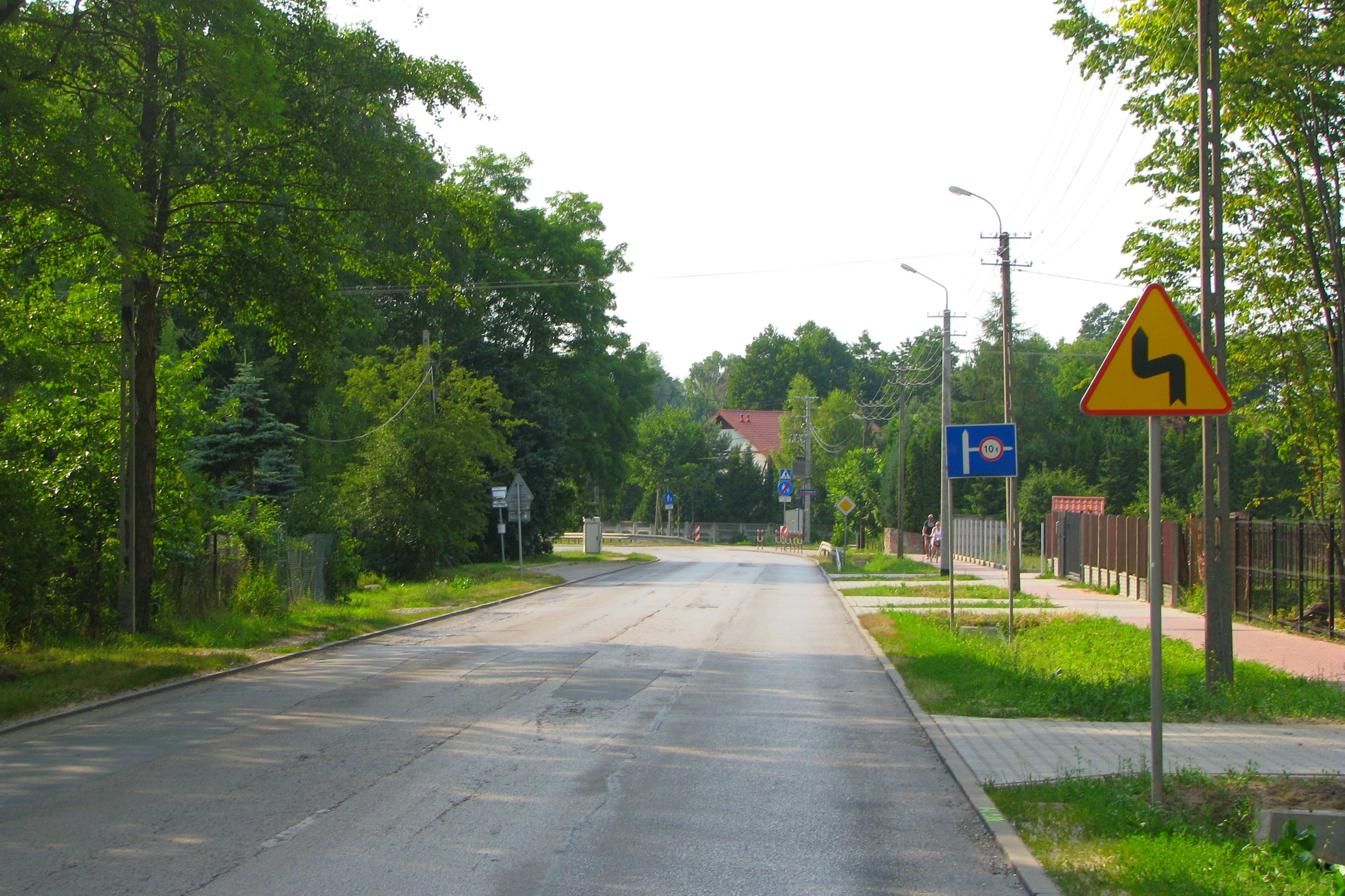

- Location within Poland
- Coordinates: 52°05′39″N 20°39′51″E
- Country: Poland
- Voivodeship: Masovian
- County: Grodzisk
- Gmina: Grodzisk Mazowiecki
- Population: 300

Kady [ˈkadɨ] is a village in the administrative district of Gmina Grodzisk Mazowiecki, within Grodzisk County, Masovian Voivodeship, in east-central Poland.

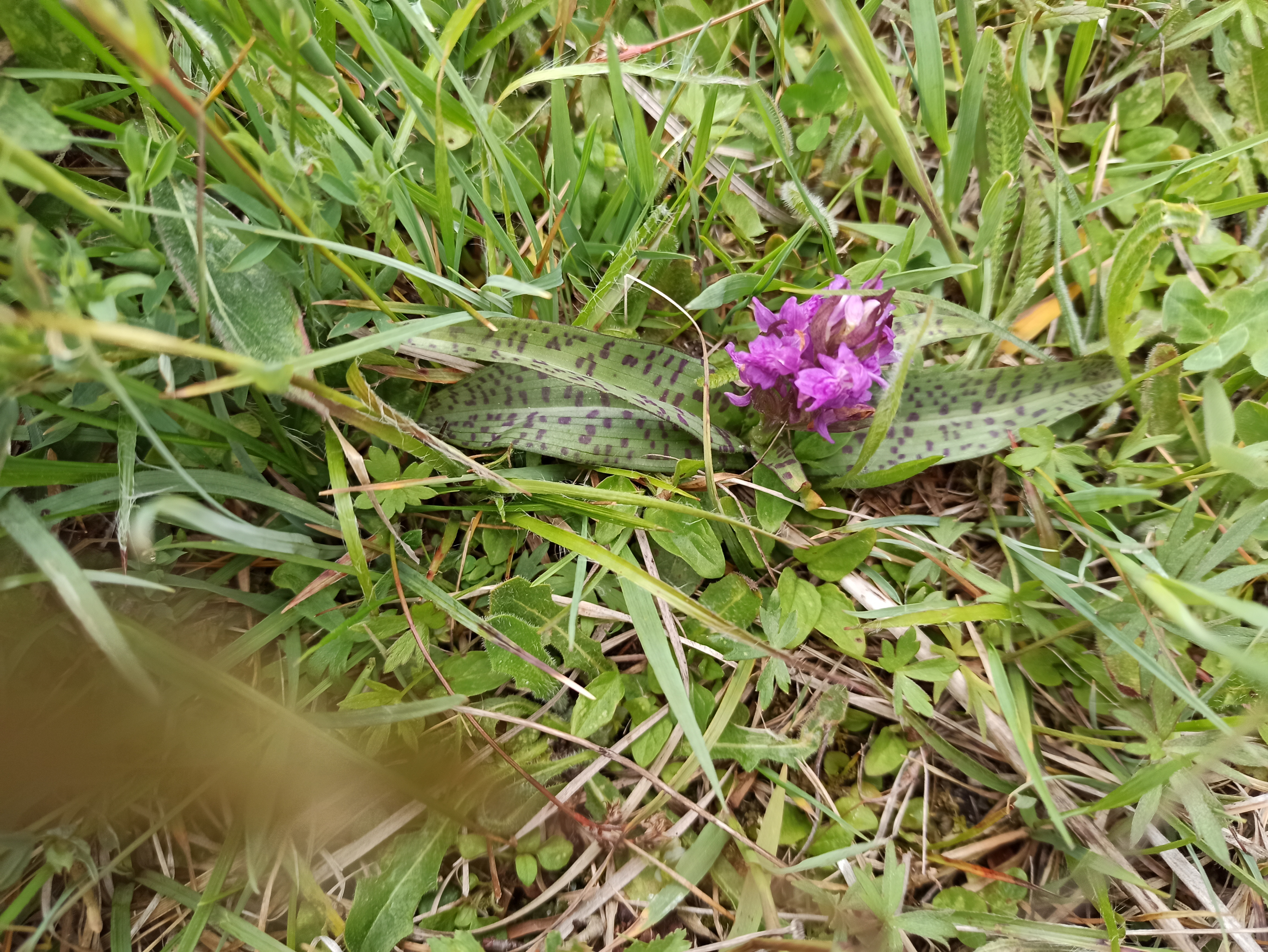

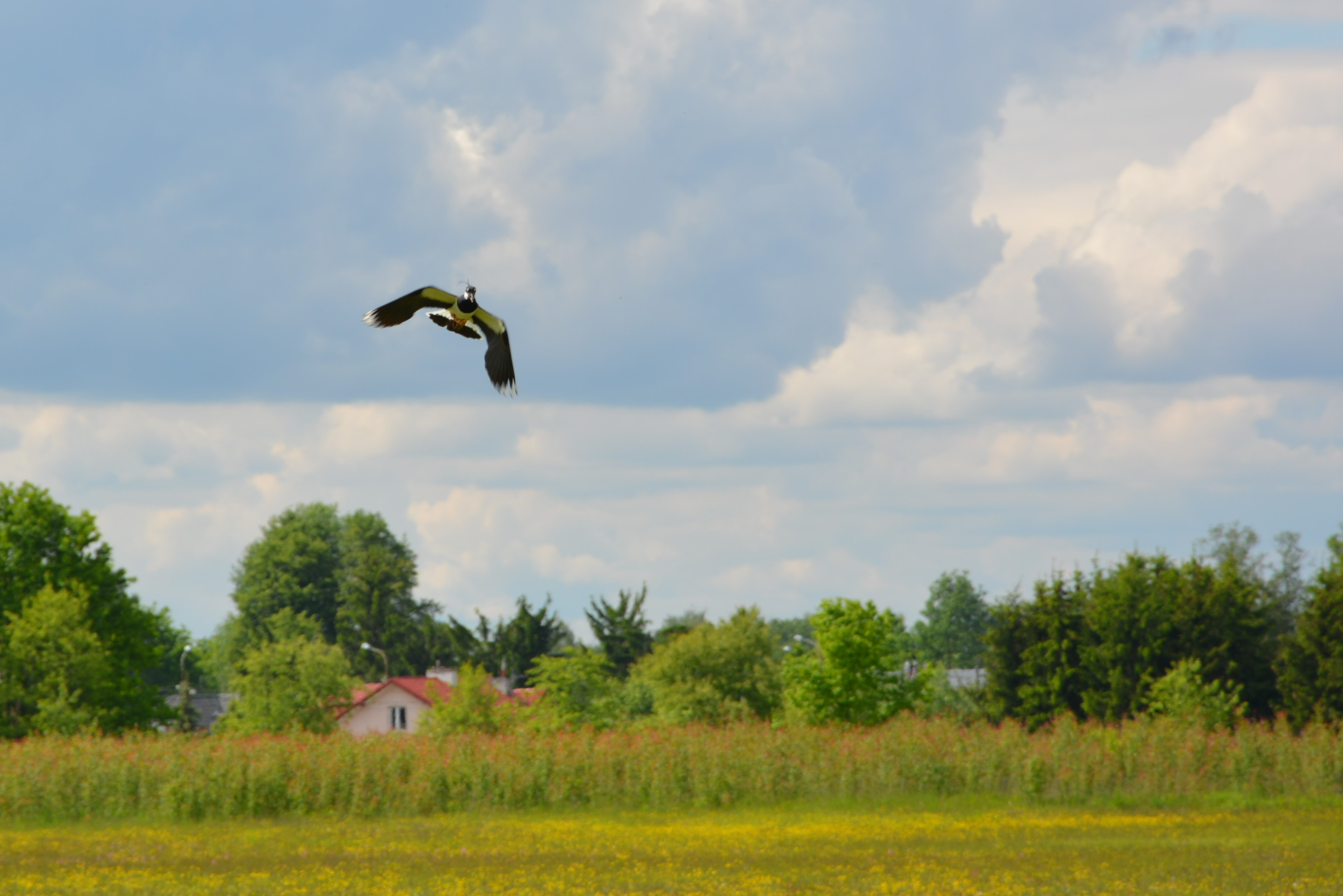

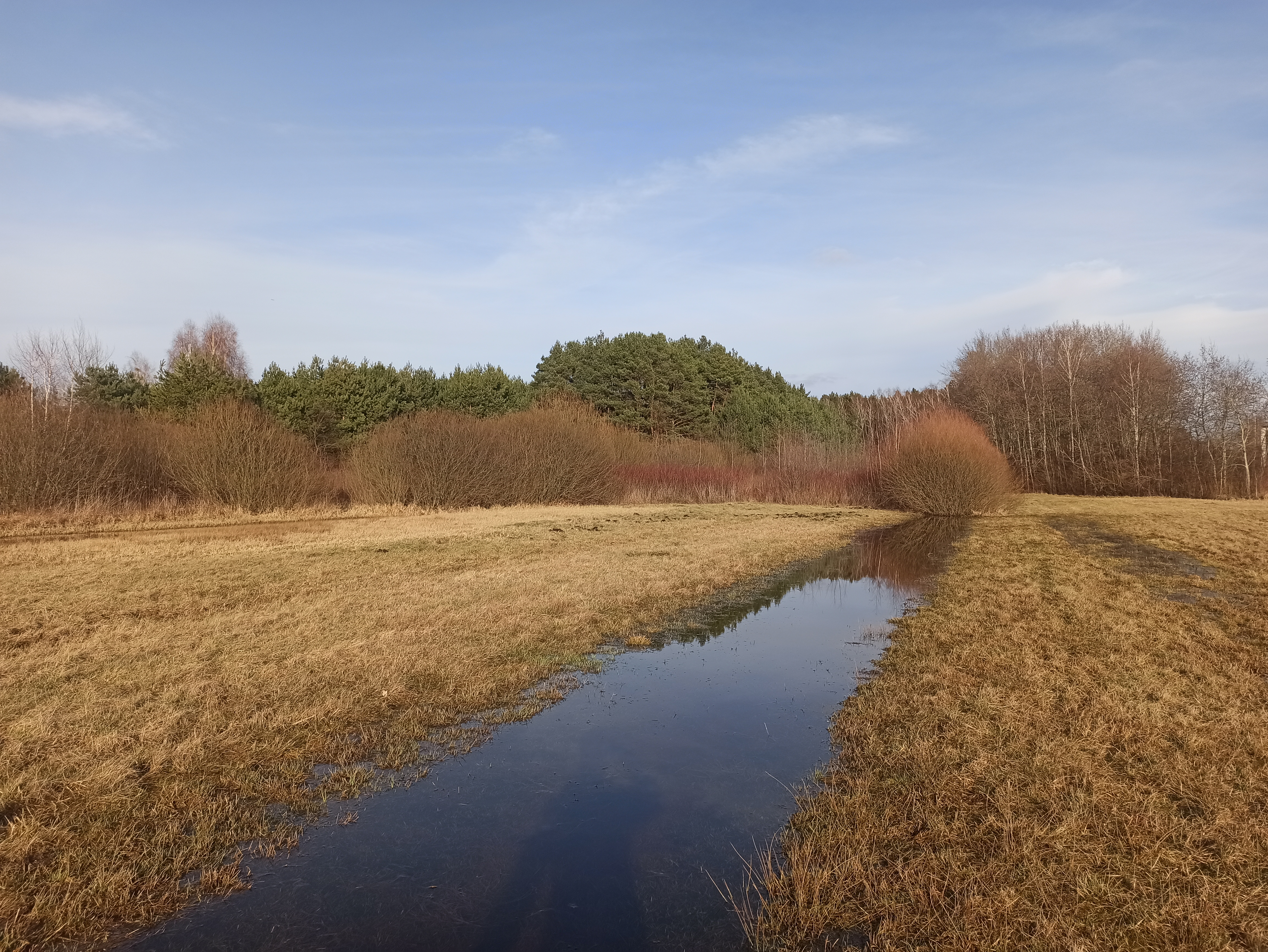

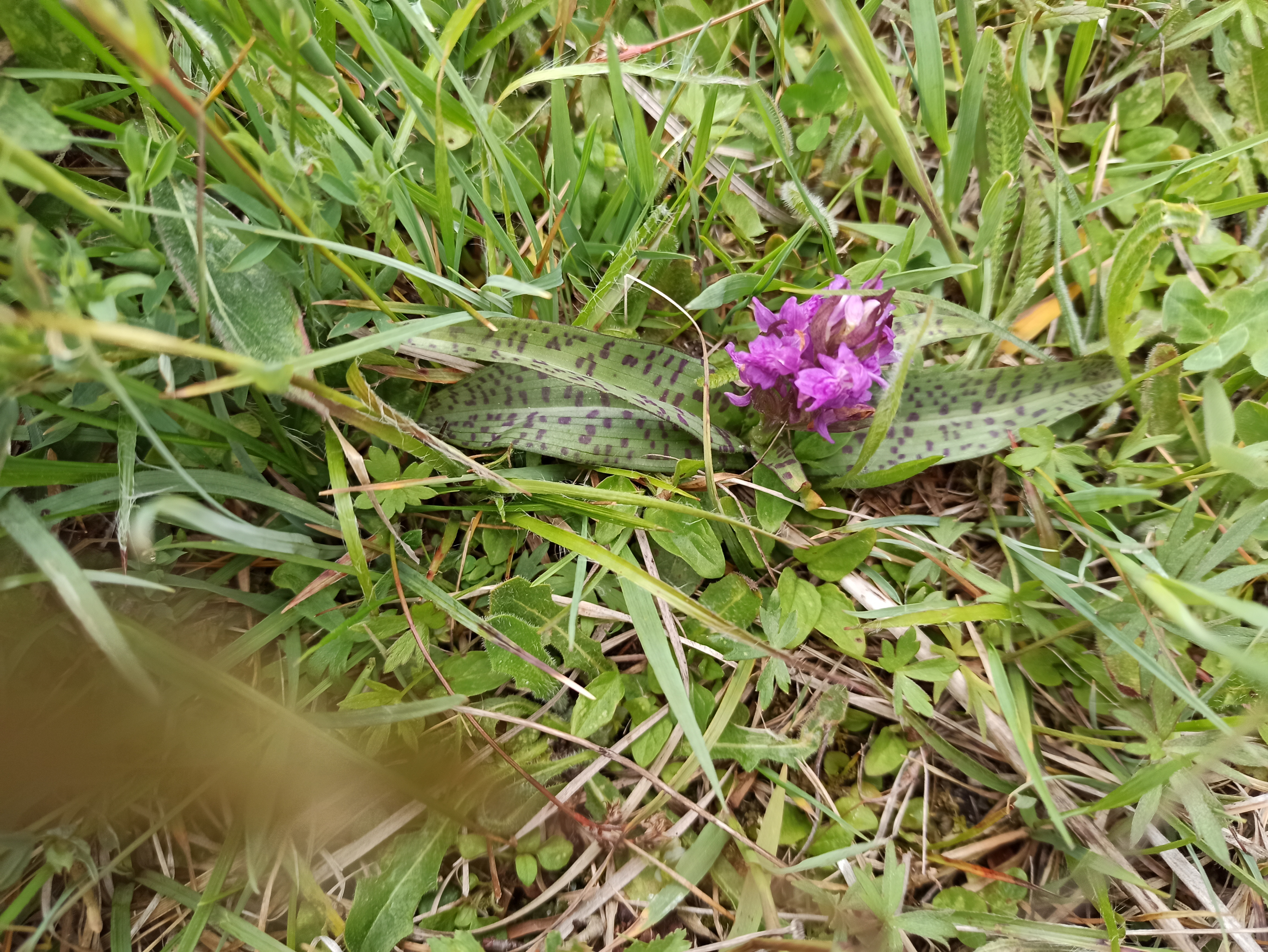

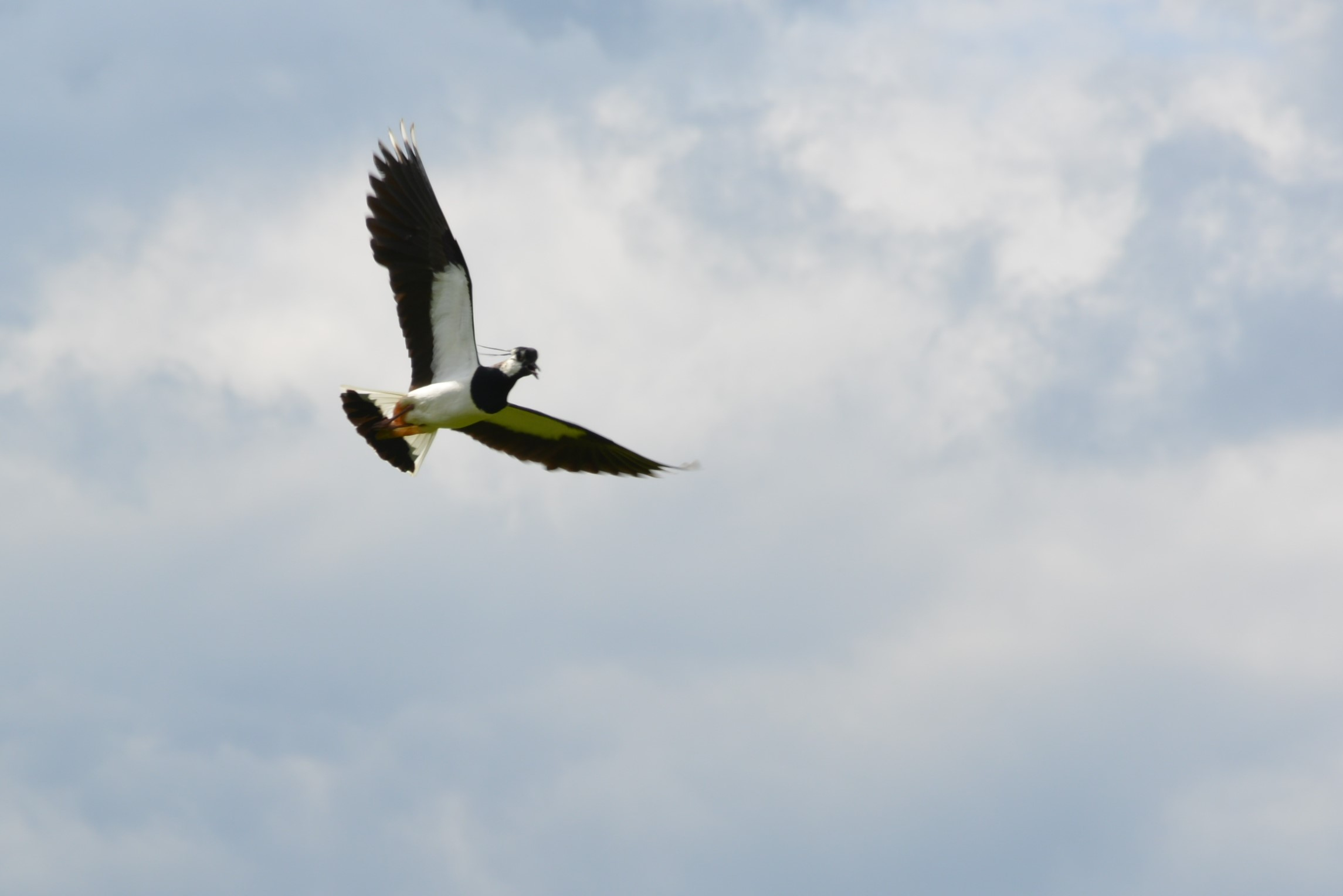

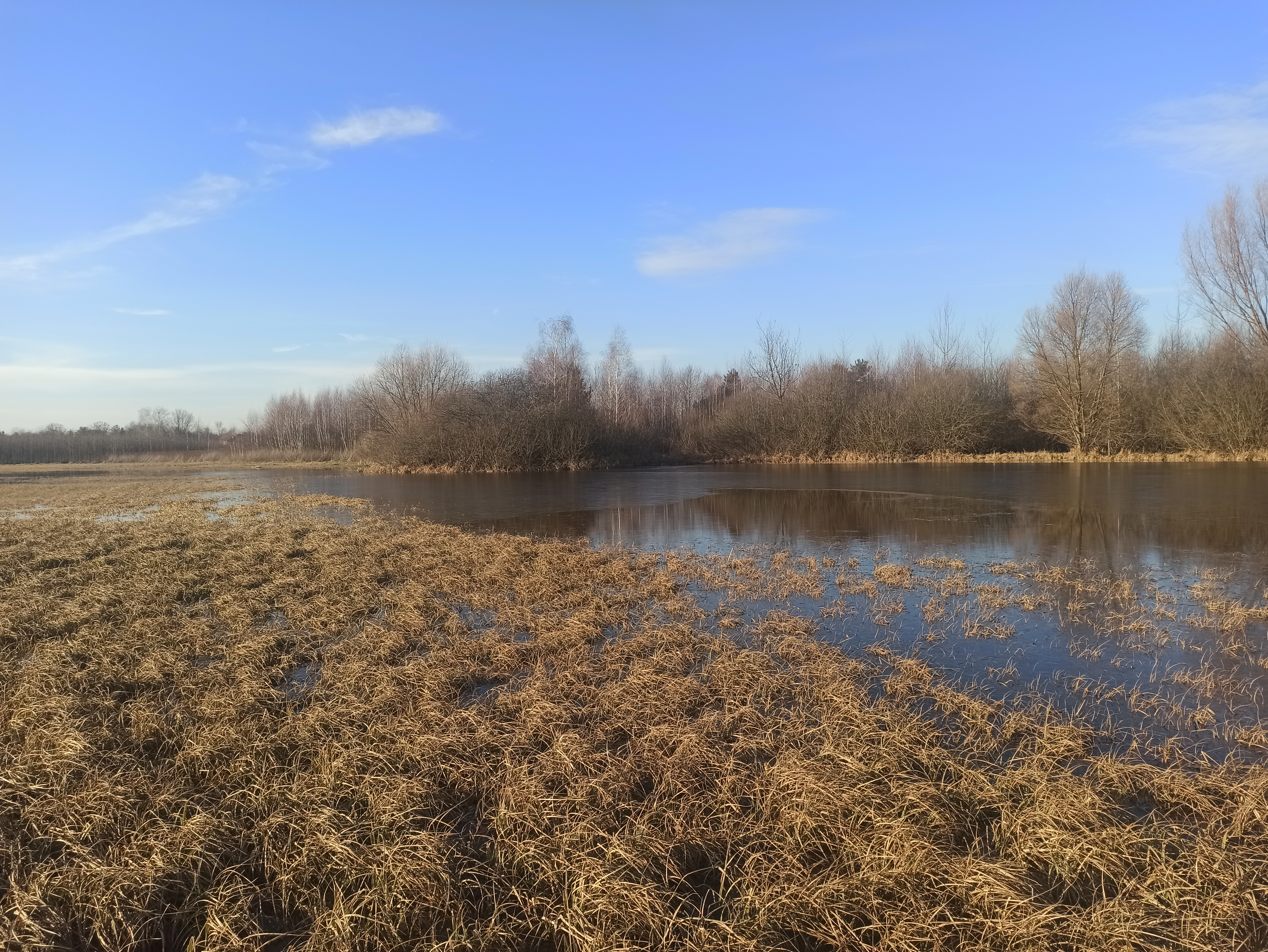

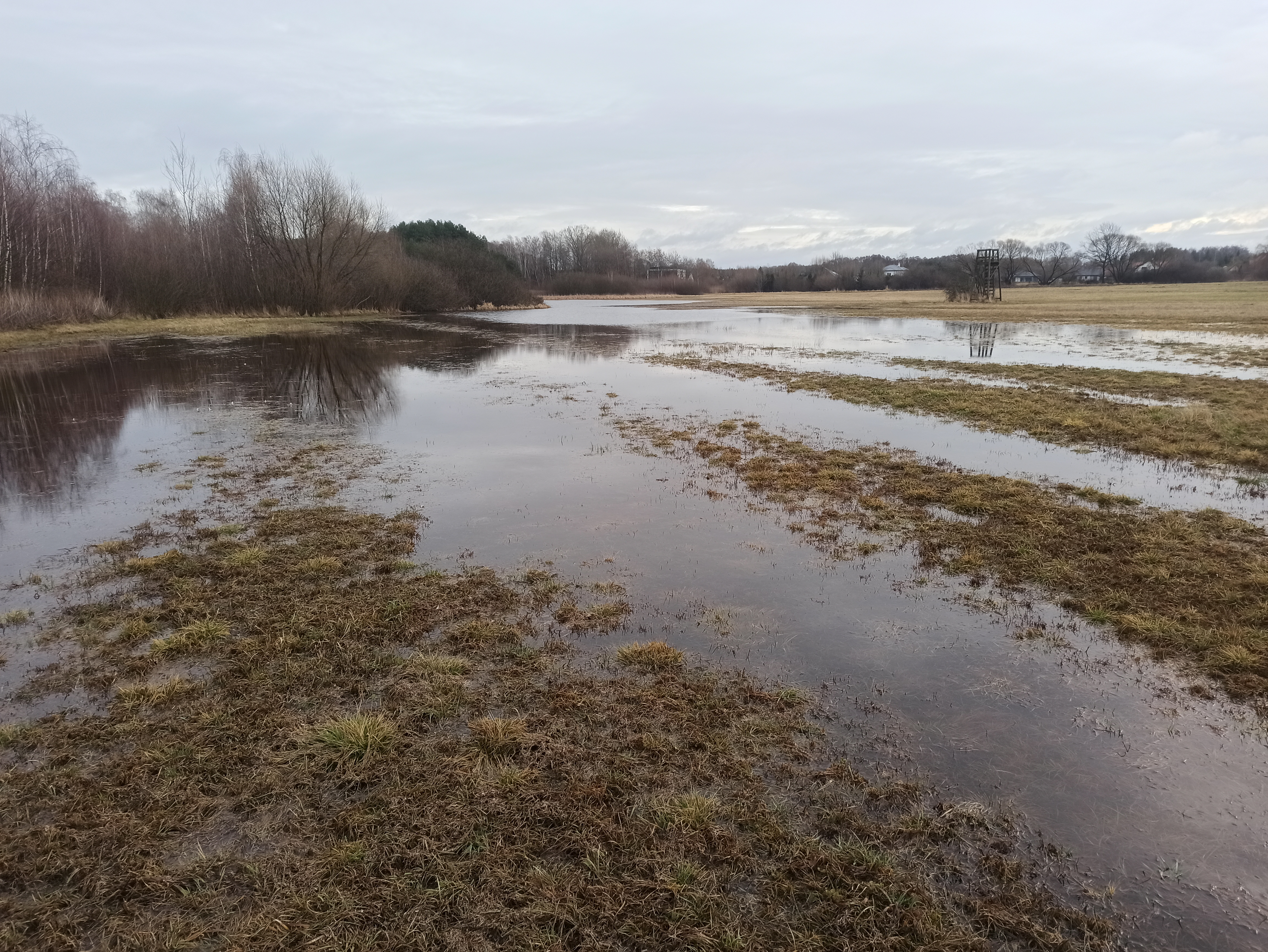
