= Cady (surname) =

Cady is a surname that may refer to:

People bearing it include:

- Benjamin A. Cady (1840–1920), American lawyer and politician from Wisconsin
- Bertha Chapman Cady (1873–1956), American entomologist and educator
- Burt D. Cady (1874–1952), American politician from Michigan
- Calvin Brainerd Cady (1851–1928), musician, music teacher and educational philosopher and writer
- Carol Cady (born 1962), American shot putter and discus thrower
- Charles A. Cady (1819–?), American politician from Wisconsin
- Charlie Cady (1865–1909), American baseball player
- Chauncey G. Cady (1803–1893) American farmer and politician from Michigan
- Claude E. Cady (1878–1953), American politician from Michigan
- Daniel Cady (1773–1859), American judge from New York, father of Elizabeth Cady Stanton
- Duane L. Cady (born 1946), American philosopher
- E. F. Cady (fl. 1860), American entrepreneur and settler
- Elizabeth Cady Stanton (1815–1902), American suffragist, social activist, abolitionist and leading figure of the early women's rights movement
- Ernest Cady (1842–1908), American politician from Connecticut
- Frank Cady (1915–2012), American actor
- Frank A. Cady (1858–1904), American lawyer
- H. Emilie Cady (1848–1941), American homeopathic physician and author
- Hamilton Cady (1874–1943), American chemist
- Harrison Cady (1877–1970), American illustrator
- Hick Cady (1886–1946), American baseball player
- Horace H. Cady (1801–1887), American farmer and politician from Michigan
- J. Cleaveland Cady (1837–1919), American architect
- Jack Cady (1932–2004), American author
- Jerome Cady (1903–1948), American Hollywood screenwriter
- John Hutchins Cady (1881–1967), American architect, historian, and preservationist
- Mark Cady (1953–2019), American judge
- P. L. Cady (1883–1959), American veterinarian and politician from Nebraska
- Virgil H. Cady (1876–1934), American politician from Wisconsin
- Walter Guyton Cady (1874–1974), American physicist and electrical engineer

== See also ==
- Caddy (name)
- Justice Cady (disambiguation)
