= Cad (disambiguation) =

CAD is a commonly used acronym for computer-aided design.

CAD or Cad may also refer to:

== Science, medicine, computing, and mathematics ==
- Charged aerosol detector, used to measure the amount of chemicals in a sample
- Collisionally activated dissociation, a technique in mass spectrometry
- Cold-air damming, a meteorological phenomenon
- CAD (gene), an enzyme-encoding gene
- Caspase-activated DNase, a protein encoded by the DFFB gene in humans
- Coronary artery disease, a group of cardiovascular diseases
- Cold agglutinin disease, an autoimmune disease that makes the suffering predisposed to autoimmune hemolytic anemia
- Computer-aided diagnosis, software for assisting physicians in the interpretation of medical images
- Control-alt-delete
- Cylindrical algebraic decomposition, a notion and an algorithm in computer algebra and real algebraic geometry
- A right-continuous function, often seen as part of the acronym càdlàg for continue à droite, limite à gauche from French.

== Transportation and places ==
- Computer-aided dispatch, software used to dispatch and track vehicles or personnel
- Center axle disconnect, a type of automotive drivetrain
- Civil Aviation Department (Hong Kong), also called CAD
- CAD, the IATA code for Wexford County Airport in Michigan, United States
- CAD, the station code for Cadoxton railway station in Wales
- CAD (TransMilenio), a mass-transit station in Bogotá, Colombia
- cad., part of a Turkish address standing for caddesi (road)
- Cad (river), a river in Romania
- Cad Brook, a tributary of the River Isle in Britain

== Language, literature, and people ==
- cad, the ISO 639 code for the Caddo language of the Caddo Nation of Oklahoma
- Chicago Assyrian Dictionary, a project to compile a dictionary of the Akkadian language
- CAD, abbreviation for the American Ctrl+Alt+Del (webcomic)
- Cad Bane, a character in the Star Wars franchise
- Cad (character), a man who is aware of gentlemanly codes, but does not live up to them
- Cad Coles (1886–1942), American baseball player

== Other uses ==
- Canadian dollar, by currency code CAD
- Capital Adequacy Directives CAD1 and CAD2, EU directives on capital requirements
- Central Ammunition Depot (disambiguation), several depots nicknamed "CAD"
- Civil Affairs Division, of the US Army

== See also ==
- CADS (disambiguation)
- CADD (disambiguation)
- CAAD, abbreviation for Computer-aided architectural design
- caid (sport), pronounced "cad"
