= Candy (name) =

Candy is a surname, given name, nickname or stage name. It is often used as a hypocorism for the feminine given name Candace.

== People ==
=== Surname ===
- Brooke Candy (born 1989), American rapper and tattoo artist
- Charles Candy (1832–1910), American soldier
- Christian and Nick Candy, British luxury property developers
- Don Candy (1929–2020), Australian tennis player
- Henry Candy (born 1944), British racehorse trainer
- John Candy (1950–1994), Canadian actor and comedian
- John Candy (RAF officer) (1897–1955), British aviator

=== Given name, nickname or stage name ===
- Candy (Salem witch trials), a slave accused of witchcraft during the Salem witch trials
- Candy Atherton (1955–2017), British politician and journalist
- Candy Barr (1935–2005), American stripper, burlesque dancer and model
- Candy Broad (born 1956), Australian politician
- Candy Candido (1913–1999), American radio performer and voice actor
- Candy Chen (born 1993), Taiwanese actress
- Candy Clark (born 1947), American actress
- Candy Crowley (born 1948), American news anchor
- Candy Cummings (1848–1924), American baseball player
- Candy Darling (1944–1974), American transgender actress
- Candy Devine (born 1956), American actress
- Candy Dulfer (born 1969), Dutch jazz saxophonist
- Candy Jernigan (1952–1991), American artist and designer
- Candy Johnson (1944 – 2012), American singer and dancer
- Candy Jones (1925–1990), American fashion model, writer and radio talk show hostess
- Candy Hsu (born 1998), Taiwanese singer-songwriter and actress
- Candy Idoko (born 1985), Nigerian tennis player
- Candy Lo (born 1974), Hong Kong singer-songwriter and actress
- Candy Maldonado (born 1960), Puerto Rican former Major League Baseball player
- Candy Massaroni, American politician
- Candy Nelson (1849–1910), American Major League Baseball player
- Candy Reynolds (born 1955), American former tennis player
- Candy Spelling (born 1945), American author and theater producer
- Candi Staton (born 1940), American singer
- Candy Yuen (born 1984), Hong Kong actress and presenter
- Mandy Candy (born 1988), Brazilian YouTuber
- Ray Candy (1951–1994), American professional wrestler

== Fictional characters ==
- Candy Kong, in the Donkey Kong video game series
- Candy Southern, in the Marvel Comics universe
- DJ Candy, in the MySims video game series
- Etta Candy, in the DC Comics Wonder Woman series
- Candy, in John Steinbeck's 1937 novel Of Mice and Men
- Candy Canaday, in the TV series Bonanza
- Candy Cat, from the TV series "Peppa Pig"
- Candy, in the TV series Dave the Barbarian
- Candy, in the anime series Smile PreCure!
- Candy, the title character of Candy Candy, a 1976 Japanese shojo manga, anime and novel series
- Candy Caramella, in the TV series Space Goofs
- Candy Chiu, a character from Gravity Falls
- Candy Smiles, in the TV series Cory in the House
- Candy Jams, a character in the animated series Grojband
- King Candy, character from Wreck-It-Ralph

== See also ==
- Candace (given name)
- Candice (disambiguation)
- Caddy (name)
