= Caddy =

Caddy may refer to:

- Caddie, also spelled caddy, a golfer's assistant
- A shopping caddy
- A box or bin, such as a "green bin" for food waste
- Caddy (bridge), an assistant to a tournament director
- Caddy (surname)
- Caddy (given name)
- Caddy (tea), a receptacle used to store tea
- Caddy (hardware), a protective case for an electronic module
- Catty or Caddy, an Asian unit of weight
- Caddy, nickname of Cadborosaurus, a sea serpent in folklore
- Caddy, Shetland term for a home reared orphan animal
- Caddy (barbell), a 45 pound barbell weight
- Caddy (web server), an open-source web server

== People ==
- Caddy (fl. 1990s), Romanian musician in B.U.G. Mafia

== Places ==
- Caddy, County Antrim, Northern Ireland, a townland
- Caddy Lake, Manitoba, Canada

== Arts and entertainment ==
- "The Caddy" (film), a 1950s film starring Dean Martin and Jerry Lewis
- "The Caddy" (Seinfeld), a television episode
- "The Caddy" (Line of Duty), a television episode
- Caddy, a fictional character in the novel The Sound and the Fury by William Faulkner

== Automobiles ==
- Caddy, an informal name for a Cadillac
- Volkswagen Caddy, a light commercial van

== See also ==
- Cady (disambiguation)
- CADD (disambiguation)
- Caddie (disambiguation)
- Caddo (disambiguation)
- Candy (disambiguation)
- Cardy (disambiguation)
- Cuddy (disambiguation)
- Khadi
