= Caddy (surname) =

Caddy is a surname. Notable people with the surname include:

- Alan Caddy (1940–2000), guitarist in the 1960s British instrumental band The Tornados
- Benjamin Jennings Caddy (1881–1955), South African trade unionist
- Caroline Caddy (born 1944), Australian poet
- Dorian Caddy (born 1995), French footballer
- Douglas Caddy, American lawyer
- Eileen Caddy (1917–2006), one of the founders of the Findhorn Foundation community
- Florence Caddy (1837–1923), English writer
- George Caddy (1914–1983), Australian dancer and photographer
- Jo Caddy (1916–2006), Australian-American painter and ceramicist
- John Caddy, American poet and naturalist
- Joseph Caddy (1885–1946), English footballer
- Josh Caddy (born 1992), Australian rules footballer
- Peter Caddy (1917–1994), British caterer and hotelier, and founder of the Findhorn Foundation community
- Warren Caddy (born 1997), French footballer
- William R. Caddy (1925–1945), United States Marine and Medal of Honor recipient

== See also ==
- Caddy (name)
- Cady (disambiguation)
