= Caddo (disambiguation) =

The Caddo are Native American people in United States.

Caddo may also refer to:

- Caddo (harvestman), a genus of arachnids in the Caddidae family
- Caddo language, a language spoken in the Great Plains region of the United States

== Places ==
In the United States

- Caddo, Alabama, an unincorporated community
- Caddo, Missouri, an unincorporated community
- Caddo, Oklahoma, a town
- Caddo, Texas (disambiguation), a list of towns with the name
- Caddo Parish, Louisiana
- Caddo County, Oklahoma

== See also ==
- Caddo Public Schools (disambiguation)
- Caddy (disambiguation)
