= Cuddy =

Cuddy may refer to:

== Places in the United States ==
- Cuddy, Pennsylvania, an unincorporated community
- Cuddy Valley, California
- Cuddy Canyon, California

== People and fictional characters ==
- Cuddy (surname)
- Edward Aburrow Sr (1714/1715–1763), English cricketer and reported smuggler under the alias Cuddy
- Cuddy, a comic strip by comedian Trevor Moore

== Other uses ==
- Cuddy (cabin), a small cabin or cupboard, especially on a boat

== See also ==
- Caddy (disambiguation)
- St Cuthbert's Cave, also known as Cuddy's Cave, Northumberland, England
- Cutty (disambiguation)
