= Supply depot =

Military installation to store battlefield supplies other than ammunition

Supply depots are a type of military installation used by militaries to store battlefield supplies temporarily on or near the front lines until they can be distributed to military units. Supply depots are responsible for nearly all other types of materiel, except ammunition.

Supply depots are usually run by a logistics officer who is responsible for allocating supplies as necessary to units who request them.

Due to their vulnerability, supply depots are often the targets of enemy raids. In more modern times, depots have been targeted by long range artillery, long-range missiles, and bomber aircraft, due to the advantage that disrupted logistics can give to a belligerent force.

Types of supply depots include base, station, forward, and reserve supply depots.

== Engineer Supply Depot ==
During World War I, specialized facilities were developed to manage the storage, distribution, and preparation of engineering materials needed by troops in the field. They functioned as logistical centers that received tools and construction supplies, maintained detailed inventory systems, and dispatched materials to front-line units via rail and other transport. Depots often included workshops for assembling, repairing, or adapting equipment, enabling them to respond to changing operational demands.

== Ammunition dump ==
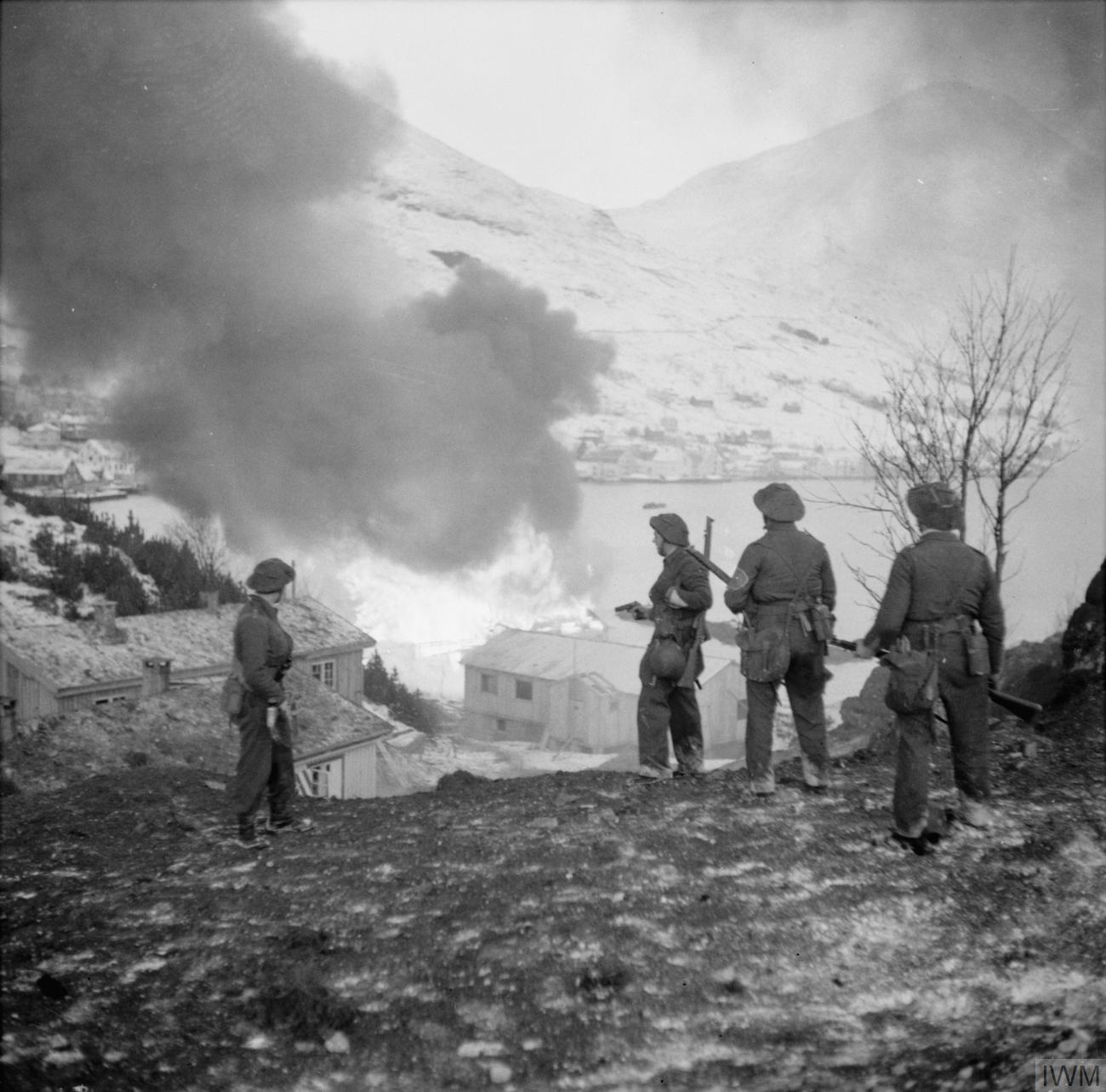
Raid on Vågsøy, 27 December 1941. British commandos watch as an ammunition dump burns (Operation Archery).

An ammunition dump, ammunition supply point (ASP), ammunition handling area (AHA) or ammunition depot is a military storage facility for live ammunition and explosives.

The storage of live ammunition and explosives is inherently hazardous. There is the potential for accidents in the unloading, packing, and transfer of ammunition. Great care is taken in handling these dangerous explosives so as not to harm personnel or nearby ammunition.

Despite the intensive preventive measures they get, ammunition depots around the world suffer from non-combat fires and explosions. Although this is a rare occurrence, there are devastating consequences when it does happen. Usually, an ammunition depot experiencing even minor explosions in one of its sites/buildings is immediately evacuated together with surrounding civilian areas. Thus, all of the stored ammunition is left to detonate itself completely for days or weeks, with very limited attempts at firefighting from a safe distance. If the ammunitions are artillery shells and other heavy types, the whole depot site affected is typically leveled.

=== Typical elements ===
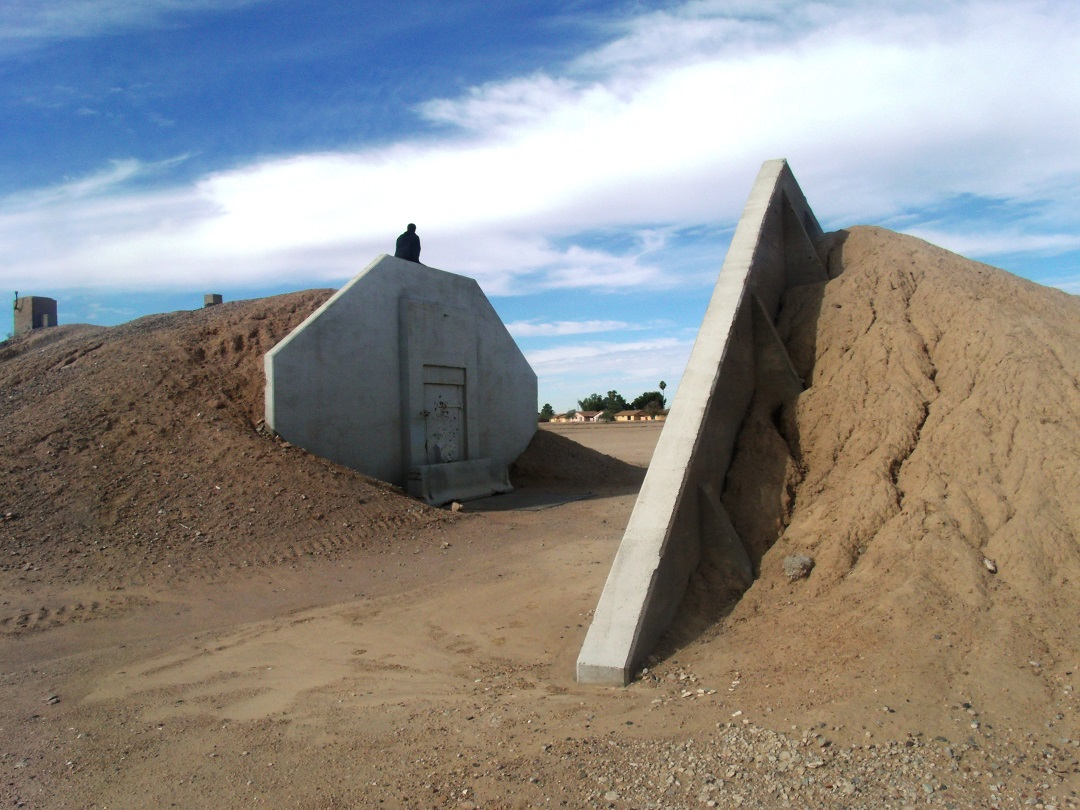
Ammo Bunker (S-1008), located southwest of Vosler Dr., at the Arizona State University at the Polytechnic campus (formerly Williams Air Force Base), in Mesa, Arizona. Built in 1925 by Webb, Del E., Construction Company. Listed in the National Register of Historic Places ref: 95000759.

The typical ammo dump will have several of the following elements:

- A buffer zone or cleared area of at least several hundred feet (sometimes as much as 1–2 km (0.62–1.24 mi)) surrounding the facility, in the event of an explosion.
- Perimeter security, such as a fence, to avoid casual access by unauthorized persons.
- Guards equipped and in numbers relative to the potential threat from enemy forces.
- Bunkers (sometimes referred to as igloos), or magazines, where ammunition is stored under lock and key.
- Blast barriers (traverses), such as an earth berm or buried pit, to divert the force of the blast (typically upward, but sometimes to the side) in case the ammunition detonates.
- Safety distances are calculated between storage sites (magazines) and outside infrastructure to limit damage and set maximum holdings of net explosive content per site.
- A loading area (transit building or area) for transferring stored ammunition to and from trucks, ships, railway wagons, etc.
- A flooding system in large facilities to put out a fire or prevent an explosion in a magazine.
- An ammunition repair facility or workshop, or maintenance inspection (M&I) will be found in many ammunition facilities. This facility is used for the repair, breakdown, inspection, and manufacture of ammunition held within or brought to the depot.
- A destruction area or demolition range used for the disposal by burning or detonation of defective, surplus, or obsolete ammunition and explosives.
- A missile shop specialised in inspection and repair of missiles, and pre-assembly of missile type weapons before being sent to the front line.

=== Field sites ===
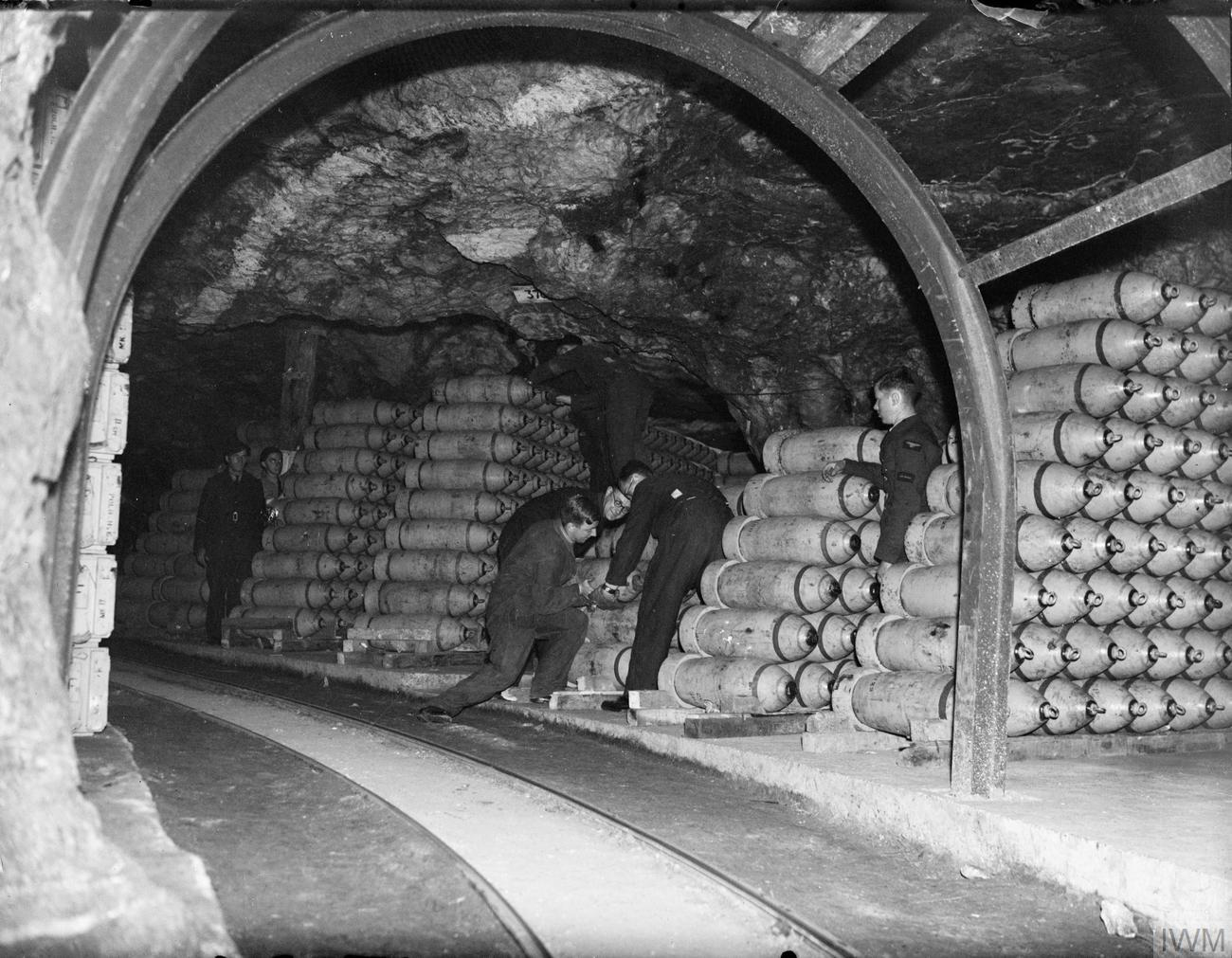
Storemen stack 250 lb (110 kg) general purpose bombs in a tunnel of an RAF Ammunition dump, which exploded in 1944.

Ammunition dump as a term is more commonly ascribed to sites that store munitions "in the field" for imminent or immediate use. These are often targets for enemy artillery attack or air attack.

== See also ==
- Armory (military)
- Central Ammunition Depot
- Emergency management
- Military logistics
- Military supply-chain management
- Powder tower
- Royal Air Force munitions storage during World War II
- Royal Army Ordnance Corps
- Royal Naval Armament Depot
- Supply chain
- War reserve stock
- Weapon storage area
