= Farai Mwakutuya =

Zimbabwean journalist

- Born: Zimbabwe
- Occupation(s): Reporter, radio host
- Years active: 1998–present

Farai Mwakutuya is an African journalist who has worked for Uganda's Nation Media Group and NTV. For some years he was with ZiFM Stereo in Zimbabwe. He has interviewed Dr. Lazarus Dokora who was Zimbabwe's Minister of Education, Sport and Culture, and has reported on events such as the house arrest of Robert Mugabe.

== Background ==
Farai Mwakutuya was born in Zimbabwe.

== Career ==
Mwakutuya began his journalistic career in Zimbabwe in 1998. In 2007 he relocated to Uganda. In Uganda, he worked for Nation Media Group. He also worked for NTV Uganda as a news anchor and presenter. He also co-hosted NTV's live business debate, East African Business Agenda which was broadcast in Uganda and Kenya simultaneously.

=== ZiFM ===
In 2011, he returned to Zimbabwe. The bid team that he was part of were able to win a licence for ZiFM Stereo. ZiFM happens to be the first privately owned radio station in the country.

On Friday, May 10, 2013, he hosted a panel forum at The Broadband Forum 2013 which had the discussion broadcast on ZiFM the coming Thursday.

In August 2016, he was moved from his previous roles of presenting Ask The MP and Enterprise to presenting The Platform, replacing Ruvheneko Parirenyatwa who presented the section on May 16.

In October 2016, in his fourth year and still working at ZiFM, Mwakutuya was being headhunted by a television station in South Africa. Not long after that, it was reported in the November 3 issue of The Chronicle that along with hosts Kundayi Chiyanike and Candice Mwakalyelye, his position was terminated. All three were popular with the listeners and the unexpected terminations caught the audience by surprise. There were accusations that Tendai Madondo who had been promoted to regional stations managing director had something to do with it.

Having returned to the station, he was hosting a Thursday night program on January 12, 2018, featuring George Charamba, the spokesman for Robert Mugabe.

== Interviews ==
On March 4, 2014, he interviewed Meng Qiang, a Chinese teacher who had graduated from the Confucius Institute at the University of Zimbabwe. In 2017, Mwakutuya experienced a very tough interviewee in his interview with Dr. Lazarus Dokora. The interview took place during a talk show called Head-On on radio ZI-FM.
