= Candace =

Candace may refer to:

== People and titles ==
- Kandake, or Candace, term for the sister of the king of Kush
- Candace (given name), including a list of people and fictional characters with the name
- Gratien Candace (1873–1953), a politician from Guadeloupe

== Other uses ==
- Candace (bug), a genus of African shield bugs
- Candace, a synonym for the Candacia genus of copepods
- 4899 Candace, an asteroid
- Candace, a radio show and podcast by Candace Owens

== See also ==
- Candice, a similar given name
