= Caddie (disambiguation) =

A caddie is a person who carries a golfer's equipment and provides them with other assistance.

Caddie may also refer to:

== Arts and entertainment ==
- Caddie, A Sydney Barmaid, a 1953 Australian embellished autobiographical novel
- Caddie (film), a 1976 Australian film based on the novel
- Caddie, protagonist of Caddie Woodlawn, a children's novel and the musical adaptation

== Other uses ==
- Caddie (bag), a golf bag
- Caddie (CAD system), a software package for computer-aided design
- Caddie (historical occupation), a job running errands in early 18th century Scotland

== See also ==
- Caddy (disambiguation)
- Cady (disambiguation)
- Rod Caddies, Australian politician
