= Abraham Lincoln Presidential Library and Museum =

Presidential Library in Illinois

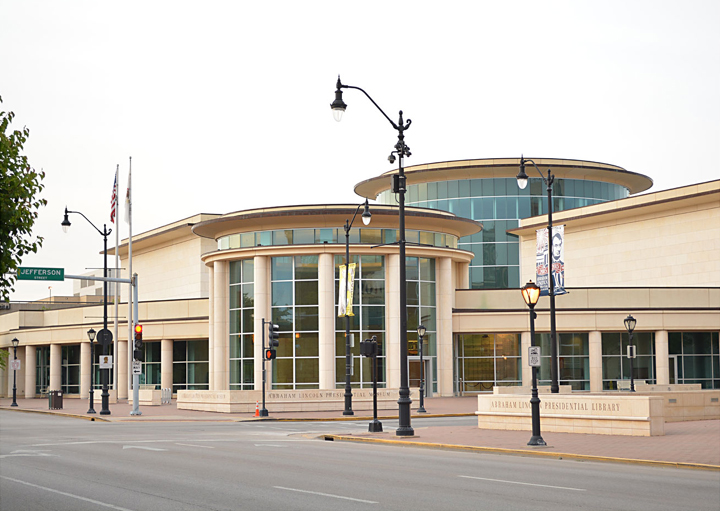
- The Abraham Lincoln Presidential Library and Museum in 2018

- Location within Illinois Location within the United States

General information
- Location: Springfield, Illinois, U.S.
- Coordinates: 39.8032°N 89.6473°W
- Named for: Abraham Lincoln
- Inaugurated: Dedicated in April 2005
- Operator: The State of Illinois

Design and construction
- Architects: HOK; Illinois Historic Preservation Agency; Thomas H. Schwartz; BRC Imagination Arts, exhibit designer

Other information
- Public transit: SMTD

Website
- presidentlincoln.illinois.gov

The Abraham Lincoln Presidential Library and Museum documents the life of the 16th U.S. president, Abraham Lincoln, and the course of the American Civil War. Combining traditional scholarship with 21st-century showmanship techniques, the museum ranks as one of the most visited presidential libraries.

Its library, in addition to housing an extensive collection on Lincoln, also houses the collection of the Illinois State Historical Library, founded by the state in 1889. The library and museum is located in the state capital of Springfield, Illinois, and is overseen as an agency of the Illinois state government. Unlike the fifteen other presidential libraries and museums, it is not currently affiliated with the National Archives and Records Administration.

== Collection ==
=== Museum exhibits ===
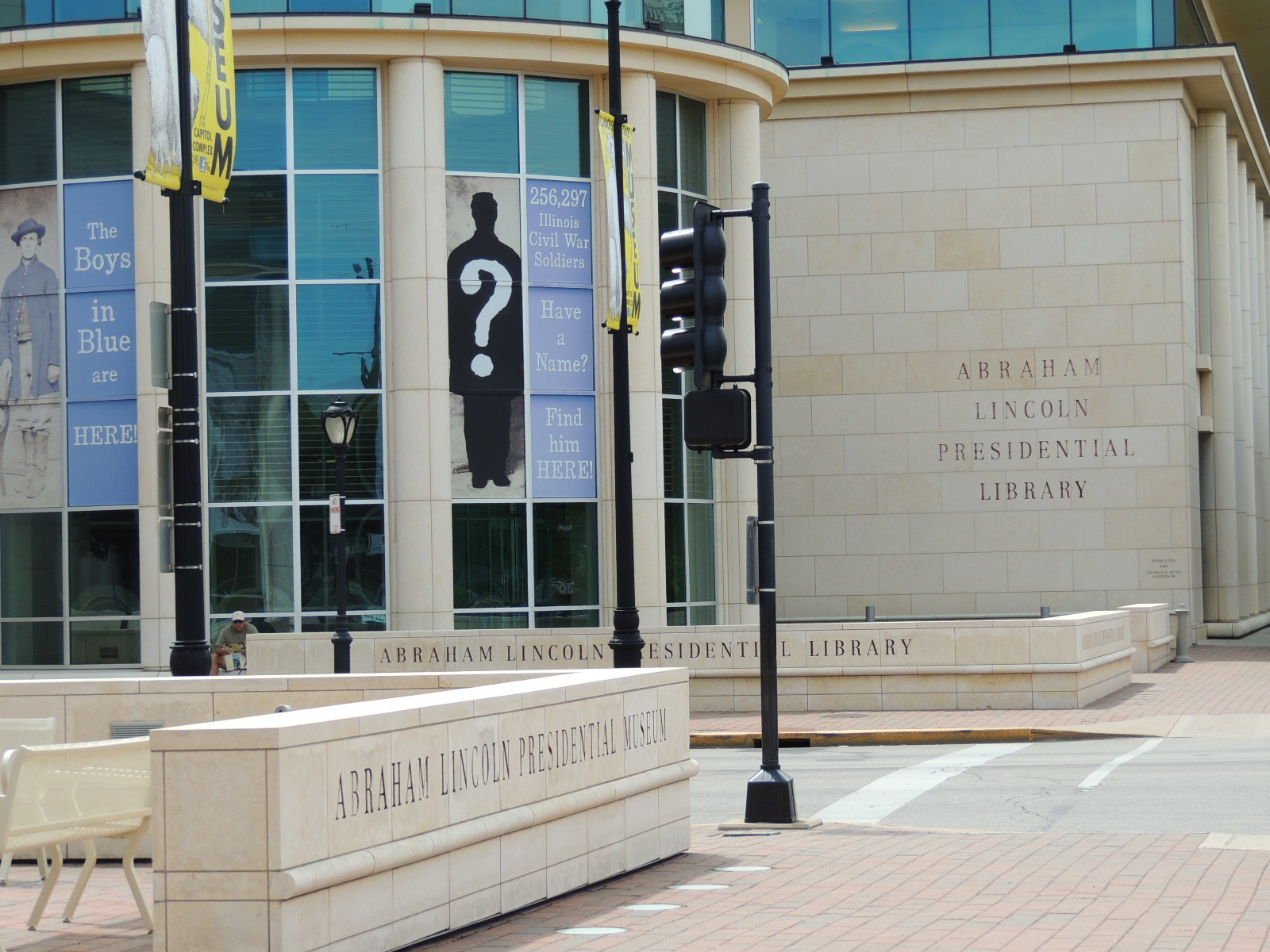
Abraham Lincoln Presidential Library and Museum at Springfield, Illinois.

The museum contains life-size dioramas of Lincoln's boyhood home, areas of the White House, the presidential box at Ford's Theatre, and the settings of key events in Lincoln's life, as well as pictures, artifacts and other memorabilia. Original artifacts are changed from time to time, but the collection usually includes items such as the original hand written Gettysburg Address, Emancipation Proclamation, his glasses and shaving mirror, Mary Todd Lincoln's music box, items from her White House china, her wedding dress, and more.

The permanent exhibits are divided into two stages of the president's life, called "Journey One: The Pre-Presidential Years", and "Journey Two: The Presidential Years", and a third, the "Treasures Gallery". Temporary exhibits are displayed in the "Illinois Gallery." Recent "Illinois Gallery" exhibits include "The Questioneers," a traveling exhibit inspired by Andrea Beaty's children's series on loan from the DuPage Children's Museum, as well as "Solidarity Now! The 1968 Poor People's Campaign," a traveling exhibit on loan from the Smithsonian Institution. Until April 20, 2025, the "Illinois Gallery" contained the exhibit "Freedom in Form: Richard Hunt." This exhibit, which includes works that are mostly on loan from the Richard Hunt Trust, is the first in Illinois since Hunt's passing in December of 2023. It was re-installed at the Loyola University of Art Museum in Chicago on July 11, 2025 and ran through November 15, 2025.

One of the museum's permanent exhibits, "Campaign of 1860", includes modern-style television updates on the campaign's progress from the late Meet the Press anchor Tim Russert. Another of the permanent exhibits, "The Civil War in Four Minutes," displays a large animated map which displays the changing battle lines of the Civil War in four minutes. In addition to its exhibits, the Lincoln Museum runs two theater shows with special effects: Lincoln's Eyes and Ghosts of the Library.

The "Under His Hat: Discovering Lincoln's Story From Primary Sources", is the home of the Lincoln Collection Digitization Project, a thematic online resource that features a 360-degree online view of his hat (the actual hat is, as of May 2013, also on display at the museum).

Burbank, California-based BRC Imagination Arts, led by Bob Rogers, was responsible for all of the permanent exhibits and presentations, music, theaters, lifelike figures and full-immersion historical settings.

=== Library collection ===
The Lincoln Presidential Library is a research library which houses books, papers and artifacts related to Lincoln's life and the American Civil War. In addition to the works associated with Lincoln and his era, the library houses the collection of the Illinois State Historical Library (founded by the state in 1889) and serves as a premier repository of books, pamphlets, manuscripts, and other materials of historical interest pertaining to the history of the state of Illinois. While the library is open to the public, its rare collection is non-circulating. A reading room, named the "Steve Neal Reading Room" in honor of Illinois historical journalist Steve Neal, is open to the public.

== Administration ==
The Abraham Lincoln Presidential Library and Museum was administered by the Illinois Historic Preservation Agency until the Library and Museum was made an independent state agency in 2017. Historian and former director of several presidential libraries, Richard Norton Smith, served as the museum and library's founding executive director. Smith was succeeded by Rick Beard, who was fired in 2008 after being arrested for shoplifting. Jan Grimes served as interim director following Beard's dismissal.

In 2010, Eileen R. Mackevich, MBE, was appointed director by Illinois Governor Pat Quinn. Mackevich formerly served as the executive director of the national Abraham Lincoln Bicentennial Commission. She was also active as a broadcast journalist and talk show host on Chicago public radio, and was the co-founder of the Chicago Humanities Festival. Mackevich's objectives were to raise money, and attract more international interest. She served until she resigned in October 2015.

In 2016, Governor Bruce Rauner appointed Alan Lowe as director of the museum and library. He served as director of the George W. Bush Presidential Center in Dallas, Texas, before accepting his position at the ALPLM. Lowe was fired in September 2019 for improperly loaning out ALPLM's original copy of the Gettysburg Address to Glenn Beck's non-profit group Mercury One.

In March 2021, Christina Shutt was appointed as ALPLM's fifth executive director. She is the first person of color to serve in the position. Before coming to the ALPLM, she headed the Mosaic Templars Cultural Center, the State of Arkansas's African-American culture and history museum.

As first lady of Illinois, Lura Lynn Ryan became a major fundraiser and the library's first chairwoman. She launched the fundraising for the library by raising $250,000. Ryan also organized a program in which Illinois schoolchildren collected pennies for the construction of the presidential library, which raised $47,000. Ryan was appointed to the 14-member Abraham Lincoln Bicentennial Commission by the speaker of the United States House of Representatives to commemorate the 200th birthday of former U.S. President Abraham Lincoln in 2009. She served on the commission from 2001 to 2010.

== Architecture ==
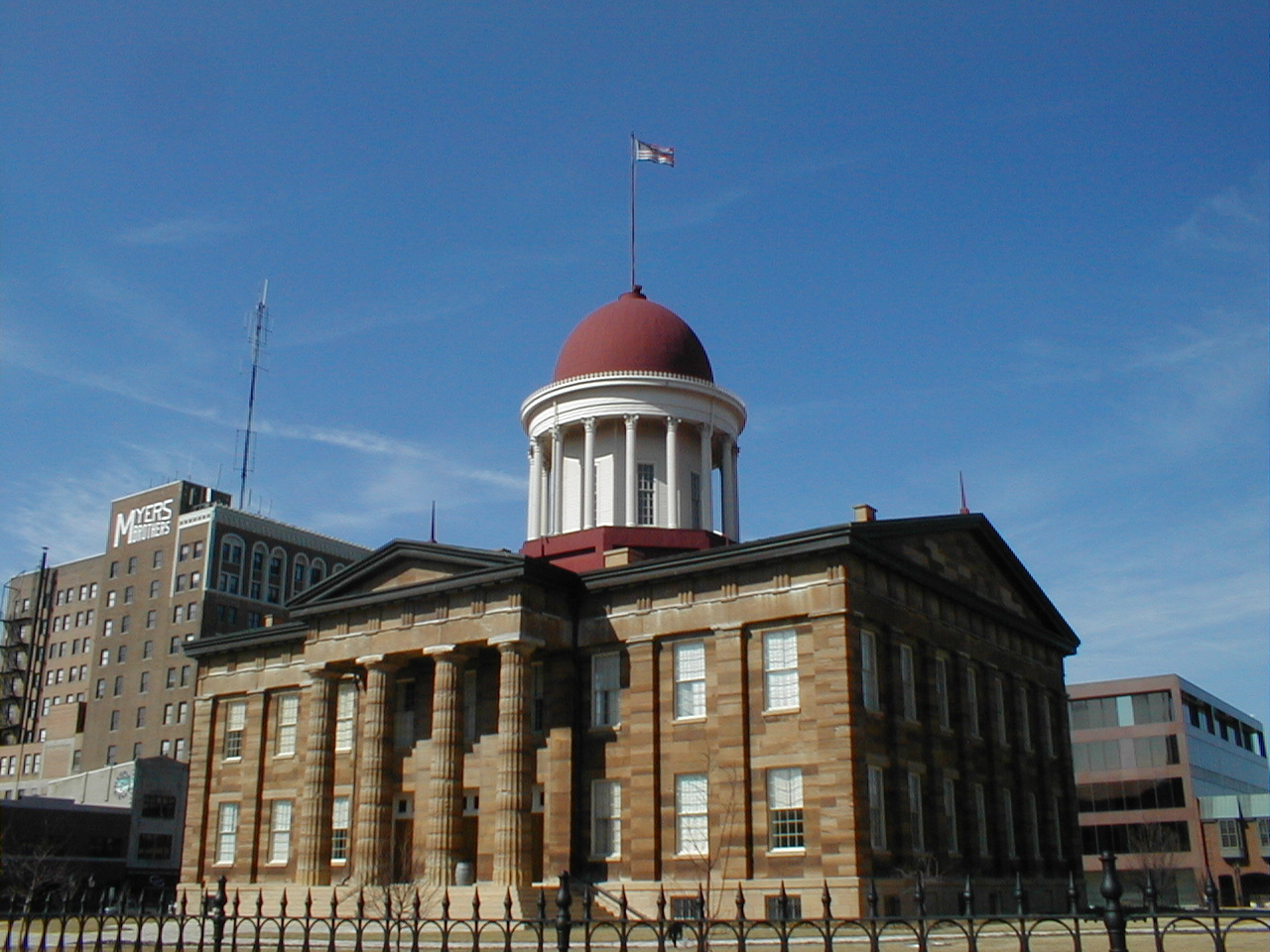
Illinois Old State Capitol

The Abraham Lincoln Presidential Library and Museum is located in Springfield, Illinois, in the historic downtown section, near many other Lincoln cultural sites. The presidential library opened on October 14, 2004, and the museum opened on April 19, 2005. Until 1970, Ford's Theatre in Washington, D.C. was designated as the "Lincoln Museum".

The buildings which now house the Abraham Lincoln Presidential Library and Museum are in three separate structures. Each structure encompasses one city block.

Two of the buildings, the museum and the library, are separated by a street and connected above the street level by an enclosed walkway. The entrance of each building features a rotunda, reflective of the dome on the Old State Capitol in Springfield, where Lincoln served four terms as a legislator. Both structures were designed by the architectural firm HOK.

The third building, the former Springfield Union Station, had originally been adapted to serve as the museum's visitor center. However, since early 2014, the station has, instead, housed an exhibit called "Lincoln: History to Hollywood", which displays two sets, as well as several props and costumes, from the 2012 film Lincoln, directed by Steven Spielberg. The sets, props, and costumes are on loan to the museum directly from Spielberg himself, and will remain on display (with costumes rotating in and out) through December 2019.

== Debate over exhibit design and education of history ==
The museum has sparked debate within the field of museum design and among historians for its use of theatrics and reproductions to tell the Lincoln story. Public response has been positive, delivering larger than expected attendance, enthusiastic visitors and a boost to the regional economy, including increased attendance at surrounding historical attractions.

However, museum traditionalists have disapproved of this departure from the display and interpretation of real artifacts. Southern Illinois University Carbondale historian John Y. Simon has said the museum's approach, which borrows presentation technologies from entertainment, trivializes the subject matter. Suggesting that it is more like a theme park than a museum, Simon called the Abraham Lincoln Presidential Museum a "Six Flags Over Lincoln" and architecture critic Blair Kamin referred to it as "Lincoln Land".

Other academics applaud the Lincoln Museum's approach. John R. Decker wrote in the Journal of American History:

Like any other modern collection [the Lincoln Presidential Museum] has an audience base that extends far beyond specialists and academics. Rather than merely pandering to the public or dumbing down history, the ALPLM intelligently and compellingly uses visual culture to meet its mission as a public pedagogical institution. The museum addresses complex historical material and opens the historical discourse to a wider audience than would be possible through more conventional means.

The scholarship behind the content and design for the Abraham Lincoln Presidential Museum was a collaboration between international exhibit designers, BRC Imagination Arts, the Illinois Historic Preservation Agency (IHPA), and a content team assembled by State Historian Thomas H. Schwartz. This content team included the world's leading Lincoln scholars, Pulitzer Prize winning historians, and Illinois school teachers representing the fourth, seventh and eleventh grades. A key goal of this collective was that exhibits promote a greater level of personal interest in Abraham Lincoln. The museum's gift shop has seen record sales of history books. Overall sales in the gift shop hit $1 million within three months of the museum's opening to the public.

== Controversies ==
Questions have been raised over the provenance of a stovepipe hat in the museum's collection said to have been worn by Lincoln and valued at $6.5 million. In 2019, the library director was fired after he sent a copy of the Gettysburg Address written by Lincoln himself to Texas for an exhibit by political commentator Glenn Beck without prior clearance. In 2024, the museum's acquisition of a 21-star US flag said to date from 1818 marking Illinois's statehood was placed under scrutiny after vexillologists said the flag may have actually dated from the American Civil War. An investigation was also opened by state authorities over irregularities in funding for its purchase, which cost the museum $15,625.

== Record attendance ==
Since its opening in April 2005, the Abraham Lincoln Presidential Museum has ranked as America's most visited state-controlled presidential museum. In about six months the museum generated about $1 million. In less than twenty-one months, the museum received its one millionth visitor. In August 2012, the museum received its three millionth visitor, with the steady attendance continuing. Museum officials credited the Steven Spielberg movie Lincoln for an increase in visitors in 2013, as the museum displayed artifacts from the film.

== Awards ==
The Abraham Lincoln Presidential Museum has been recognized with two awards: a Thea Award for Outstanding Achievement from the Themed Entertainment Association, and an award from The Lincoln Group of New York, which every year honors "the individual or organization that has done the most to encourage the study and appreciation of Abraham Lincoln". In 2022, the Library and Museum was in the process of getting accredited by the American Alliance of Museums.

== See also ==
- Abraham Lincoln Association
- Abraham Lincoln Birthplace National Historical Park
- Lincoln Boyhood National Memorial
- Lincoln Home National Historic Site
- Lincoln Memorial
- Lincoln's New Salem
- Lincoln's Tomb
- Mount Rushmore National Memorial
- Ford's Theatre National Historic Site, where Lincoln was shot by Booth, and the nearby Petersen House, where he died
- Presidential memorials in the United States
