= CADD (disambiguation) =

CADD may refer to:

- Computer-Aided Design and Drafting
- Computer-Aided Drug Design
- Combined Annotation Dependent Depletion
- Brian Cadd (born 1946), Australian musician

== See also ==
- Caddy (disambiguation)
- CADDS, an early product of the company Computervision
- CAAD, abbreviation for Computer-aided architectural design
- KADD, a radio station of the Las Vegas area of the US
- CAD (disambiguation)
