= Caddy (name) =

Caddy is a given name and a nickname. Caddy (surname) is also a surname. Caddy serves as an alternate form of the given names Candace, Caroline and Carolina.

== Given name ==
- Caddy Adzuba (born 1981), Congolese lawyer, journalist and women's rights activist
- Caddy McKeown (born 1951), American politician

== Middle name ==
- Sir Victor Caddy Davies, known as Victor Davies (horticulturalist) (1887–1977), New Zealand nurseryman and horticulturist

== Fictional characters ==
- Candace "Caddy" Compson, from The Sound and the Fury by William Faulkner

== Mononym ==
- Caddy (fl. 1990s), Romanian musician in B.U.G. Mafia
- Caddy, stagename of Tomas Dahl (fl. 2008–2010), drummer for Norwegian rock band Turbonegro

== Nickname ==
- Caddy Cadore, nickname of Leon Cadore (1891–1958), American baseball player
- Pierce Caddy Works (1896–1982), American basketball and baseball

== See also ==
- Caddy (surname)
- Cady (given name)
- Cady (surname)
- Candy (name)
- Cardy (surname)
- Cuddy (surname)
