= Caddo, Texas =

Caddo, Texas may refer to:

- Caddo, Milam County, Texas, a ghost town
- Caddo, Stephens County, Texas
- Caddo, Wilson County, Texas, a ghost town

== See also ==
- Caddo (disambiguation)
