= Mount Clemens, Michigan =

- City
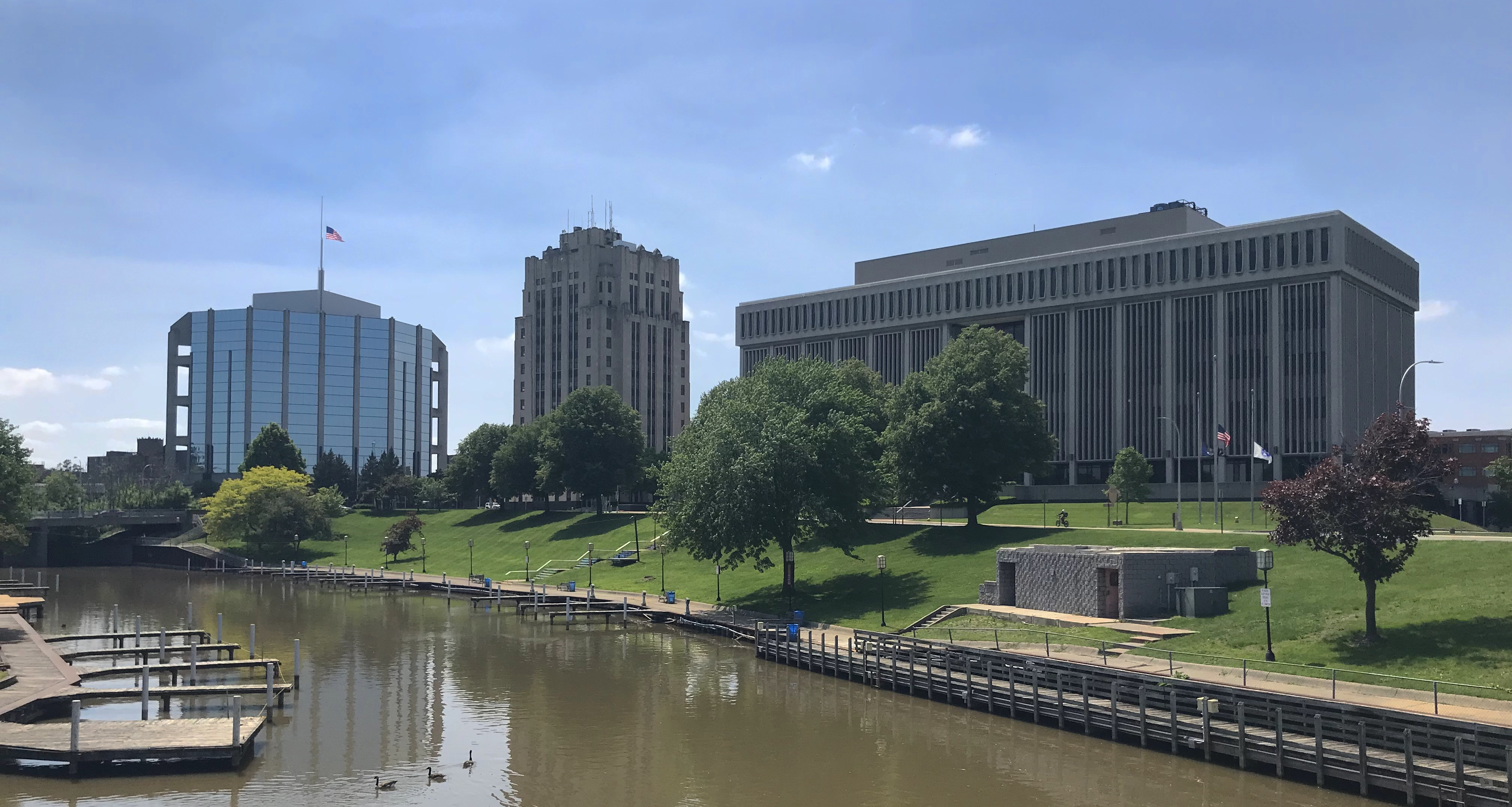
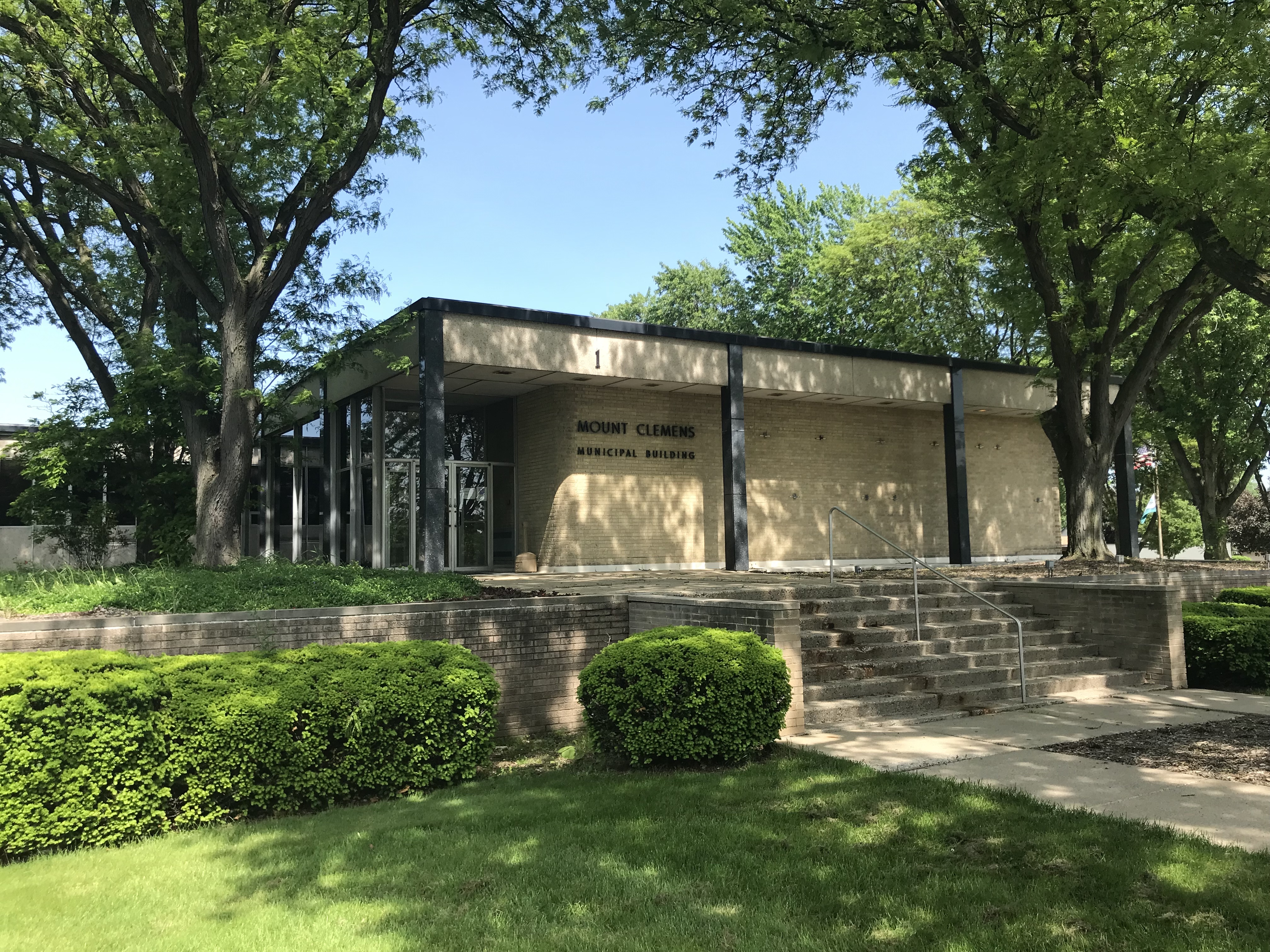
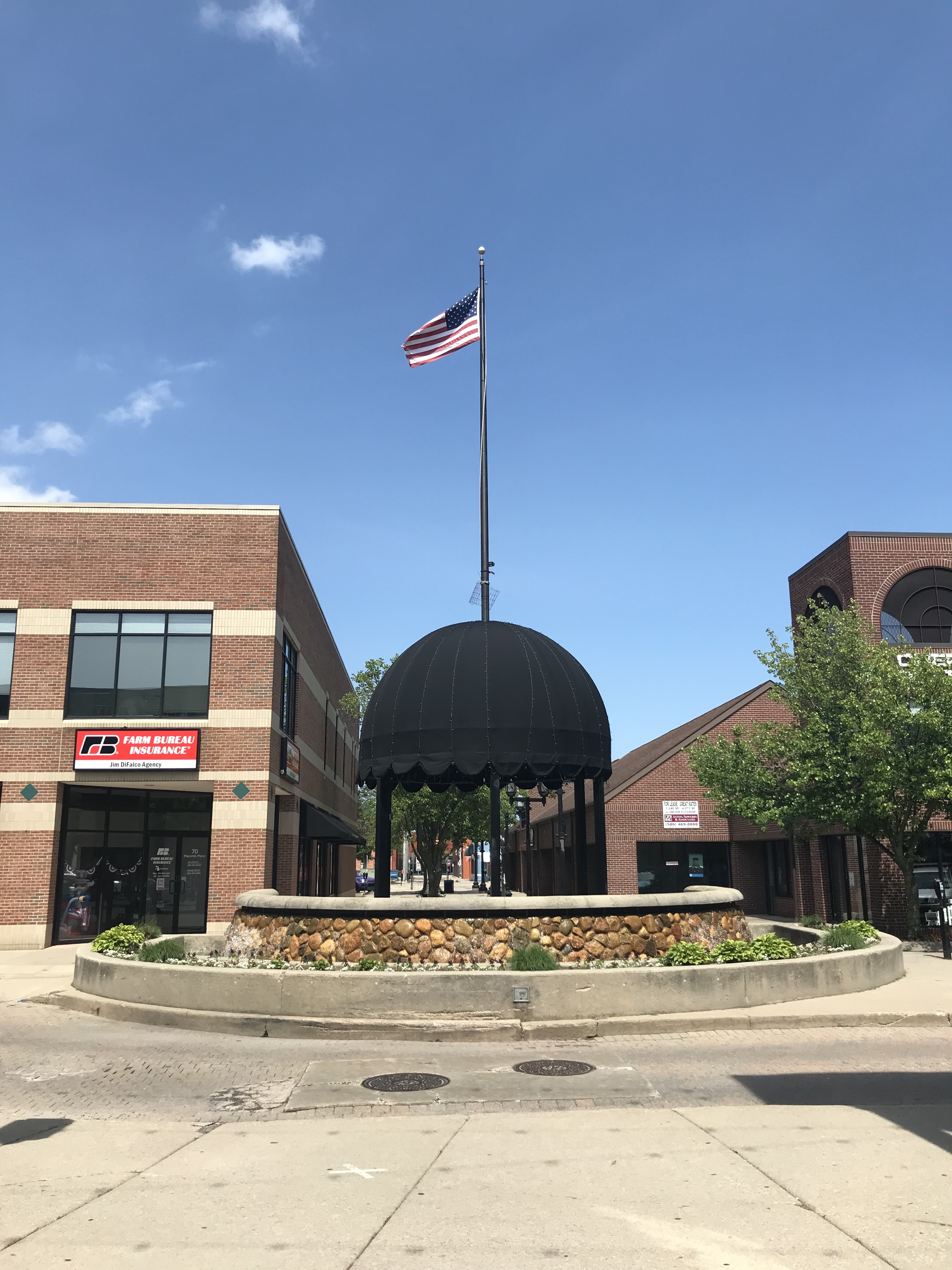
- Clockwise from top: Downtown Mount Clemens, Fountain Stage, City Hall

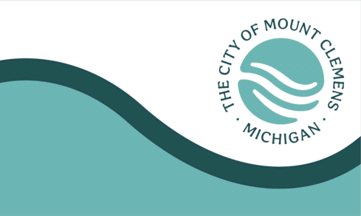
- Flag Seal
- Nicknames: Bath City, Da Clem
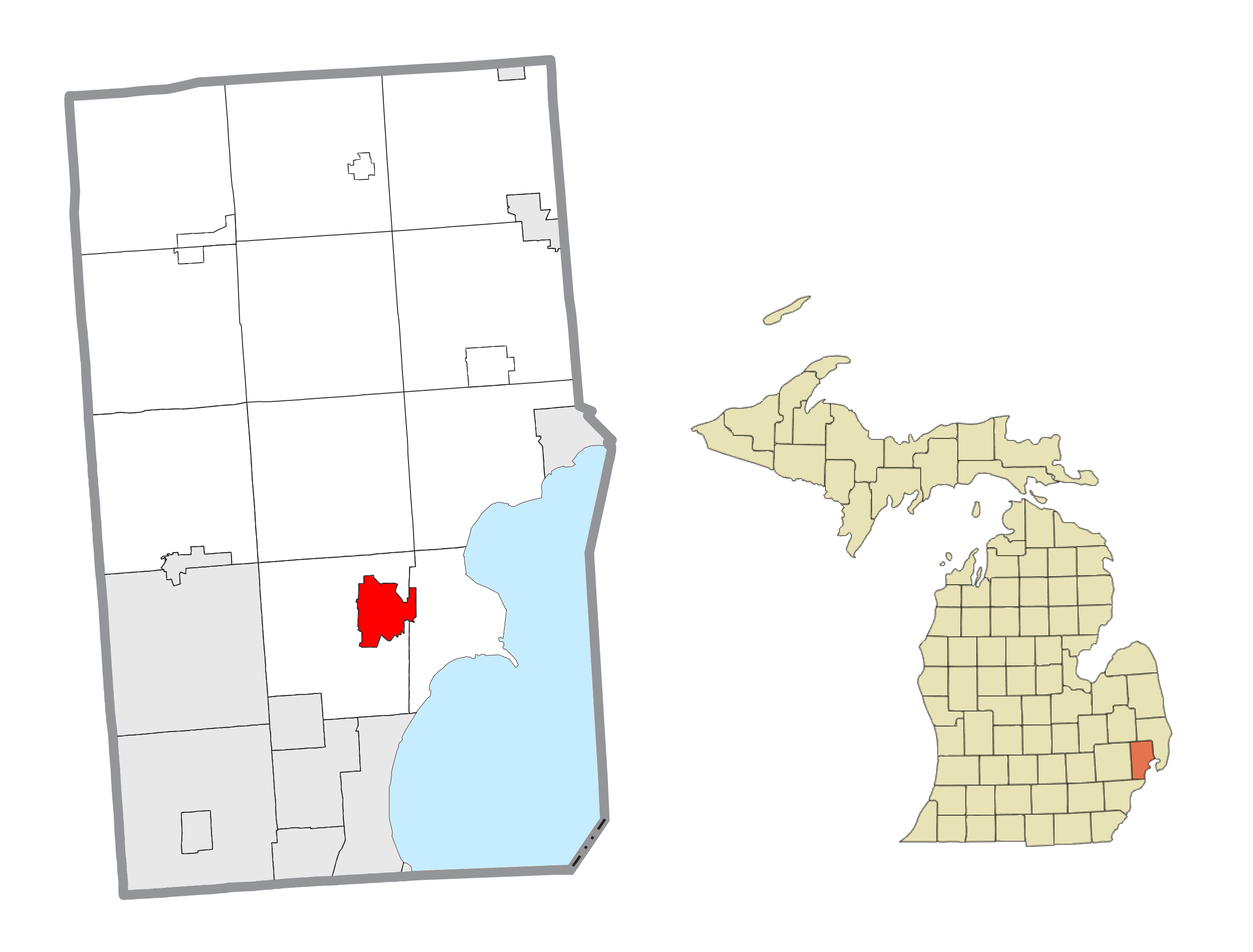
- Location in Macomb County and Michigan

- Location within Michigan Location within the United States
- Coordinates: 42°35′48″N 82°52′49″W
- Country: United States
- State: Michigan
- County: Macomb

Government
  - Type: Council–manager
  - Mayor: Laura Kropp
  - City manager: Gregg Shipman
  - City council: Commissioners: Spencer Calhoun; Barb Dempsey; Laura Fournier; Theresa McGarity; Erik Rick; Jill Yore

Area
  - Total: 4.20 sq mi (10.89 km^{2})
  - Land: 4.09 sq mi (10.60 km^{2})
  - Water: 0.11 sq mi (0.29 km^{2})
- Elevation: 604 ft (184 m)

Population (2020)
  - Total: 15,697
  - Estimate (2023): 15,378
  - Density: 3,757.4/sq mi (1,450.75/km^{2})
- Time zone: UTC-5 (Eastern (EST))
  - Summer (DST): UTC-4 (EDT)
- ZIP Codes: 48043 (general); 48046 (P.O. box)
- Area code: 586
- FIPS code: 26-55820
- GNIS feature ID: 0632785
- Website: mountclemens.gov

Mount Clemens is a city in, and the county seat of, Macomb County in the U.S. state of Michigan. The population was 15,697 at the 2020 census. It is part of the Detroit metropolitan area.

== History ==
Mount Clemens was first surveyed in 1795 after the Revolutionary War by Christian Clemens, who settled there four years later. Clemens was the son of a Pennsylvanian Mennonite farming family Clemens and his friend Oliver Wiswell purchased a distillery built in 1797 by John Brooks, which attracted workers and customers, helping to settle the area. Brooks and Clemens platted the land, and the town was named after Clemens in 1818. It received a post office in 1821, with John Stockton as the first postmaster. Christian Clemens is buried at Clemens Park, located just north of downtown.

Indian mounds were in the vicinity, more specifically just north of the Clinton River near the present location of Selfridge Air National Guard Base.

The settlement filed for incorporation as a village in 1837, but this was not acted upon by the legislature until 1851. It was incorporated as a city in 1879. It became the seat of Macomb County on March 11, 1818.

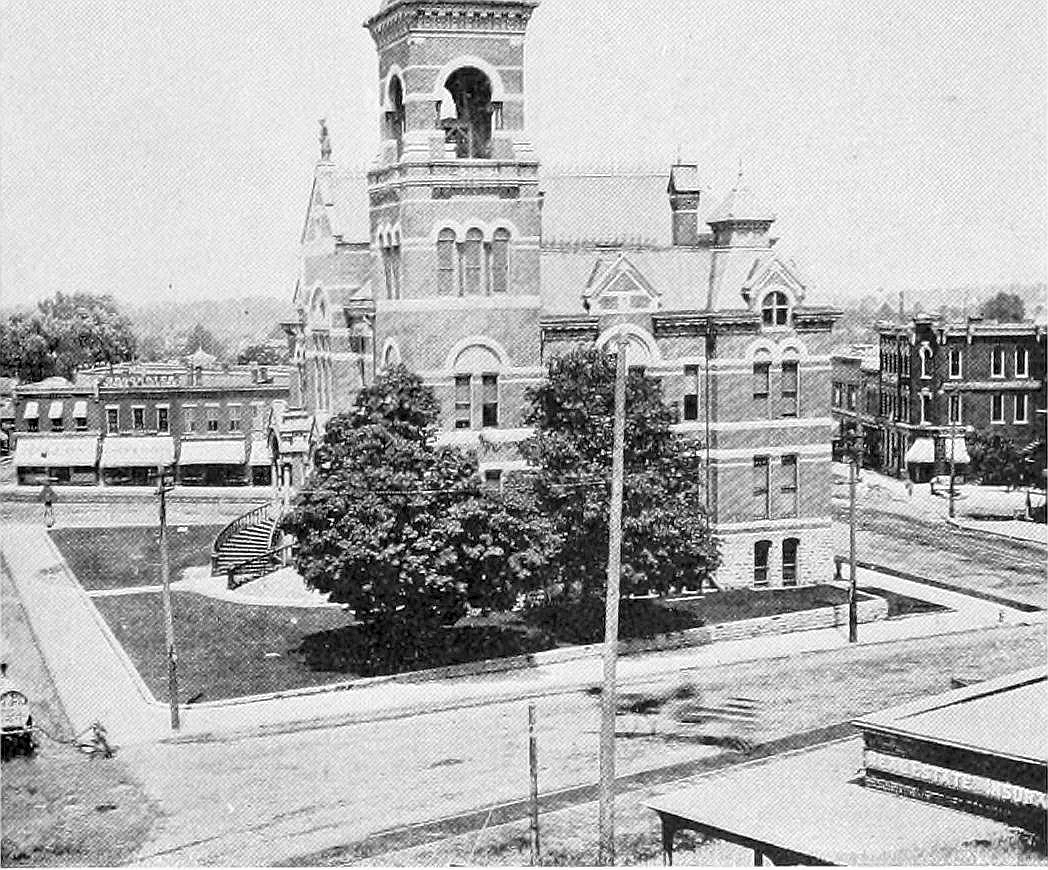
City Hall, 1900

The Mount Clemens Public Library opened in 1865 by Professor Silas Wood on the third floor of the Union School (now Alexander Macomb School). The next expansion site for library space existed downtown in 1890 in the basement of the courthouse (present site of the Macomb County Building). By 1895 it yet again outgrew its location and was relocated temporarily to the Chamber of Commerce Building (current site of N. Walnut street and New Street corner). Eager use by citizens and mineral bath tourists necessitated further growth supplemented by philanthropist support. Andrew Carnegie was solicited for donations to fund a new building for the library at the (present) corner of Southbound Gratiot Avenue and Macomb Pl in 1902. From 1904 to 1968 the public library operated out of the Carnegie building until it became the Art Center in 1970 (presently the Anton Art Center). The Mount Clemens Public Library currently sits opposite from Mount Clemens High School on Cass and Mack avenues.

Historically, Mount Clemens' largest industry for more than 100 years, from 1873 to 1974, was tourism related to the mineral baths, drawn from springs that were scattered throughout the city. Such mineral baths were very popular and were tourist destinations. At the peak of the industry, the city had 11 bathhouses and several hotels related to this trade. The first bathhouse was built in 1873 and was known as "The Original"; it was located on the corner of Jones and Water streets. The bathhouse burned in 1883, but it was rebuilt even larger the following year to accommodate the crowds of customers. Over the years, noted visitors such as film actors Clark Gable and Mae West, athletes Babe Ruth and Jack Dempsey, news magnate William Randolph Hearst, and the wealthy Vanderbilt family vacationed in the city to take advantage of the mineral springs baths.

As of 1998, the only remaining bathhouse building from this era is St. Joseph's Sanitarium and Bath House. It has recently been renamed as Select Specialty Hospital and is owned by Select Medical Corporation. This last bath house is in danger of being demolished, but the Friends of Historic Preservation are working with the city to preserve it.

The Olympia Salon & Spa, located in the Martha Washington Sanitarium on Cass Avenue, is again offering mineral baths.

From about 1898 to 1950, the Mount Clemens Sugar Company operated, processing sugar beets into refined sugar.

Throughout the late 20th century, the suburban expansion of metropolitan Detroit and its exurbs affected the city of Mt. Clemens as well as its surrounding townships.

== Geography ==
Mount Clemens is in south-central Macomb County, 20 miles (32 km) northeast of downtown Detroit, 37 miles (60 km) southwest of Port Huron, and 3 miles (5 km) west of Lake St. Clair. The Clinton River runs through the city. The city is almost completely surrounded by Clinton Township, except for the far east side which borders Harrison Township.

According to the United States Census Bureau, Mount Clemens has a total area of 4.21 square miles (10.90 km^{2}), of which 4.09 square miles (10.59 km^{2}) are land and 0.11 square miles (0.28 km^{2}), or 2.69%, are water.

=== Climate ===
Climate data for Mount Clemens, Michigan (Selfridge Air National Guard Base) 1991–2020 normals, extremes 1896–present
Month	Jan	Feb	Mar	Apr	May	Jun	Jul	Aug	Sep	Oct	Nov	Dec	Year
Record high °F (°C)	63 (17)	71 (22)	84 (29)	94 (34)	93 (34)	104 (40)	106 (41)	100 (38)	100 (38)	90 (32)	80 (27)	69 (21)	106 (41)
Mean daily maximum °F (°C)	31.6 (−0.2)	34.2 (1.2)	43.5 (6.4)	56.3 (13.5)	68.1 (20.1)	78.1 (25.6)	82.2 (27.9)	79.9 (26.6)	73.0 (22.8)	60.5 (15.8)	47.5 (8.6)	36.5 (2.5)	57.6 (14.2)
Daily mean °F (°C)	24.8 (−4.0)	26.3 (−3.2)	34.7 (1.5)	46.1 (7.8)	57.4 (14.1)	67.6 (19.8)	72.0 (22.2)	70.3 (21.3)	63.0 (17.2)	51.5 (10.8)	39.9 (4.4)	30.3 (−0.9)	48.7 (9.3)
Mean daily minimum °F (°C)	17.9 (−7.8)	18.5 (−7.5)	25.9 (−3.4)	35.9 (2.2)	46.7 (8.2)	57.0 (13.9)	61.9 (16.6)	60.7 (15.9)	53.1 (11.7)	42.5 (5.8)	32.4 (0.2)	24.1 (−4.4)	39.7 (4.3)
Record low °F (°C)	−23 (−31)	−24 (−31)	−8 (−22)	8 (−13)	20 (−7)	32 (0)	34 (1)	38 (3)	28 (−2)	17 (−8)	3 (−16)	−20 (−29)	−24 (−31)
Average precipitation inches (mm)	2.22 (56)	1.75 (44)	2.45 (62)	3.36 (85)	3.59 (91)	3.31 (84)	3.82 (97)	3.68 (93)	3.17 (81)	2.82 (72)	2.60 (66)	2.19 (56)	34.96 (888)
Average snowfall inches (cm)	10.6 (27)	8.5 (22)	5.2 (13)	0.7 (1.8)	0.0 (0.0)	0.0 (0.0)	0.0 (0.0)	0.0 (0.0)	0.0 (0.0)	0.0 (0.0)	1.3 (3.3)	5.9 (15)	32.2 (82)
Average precipitation days (≥ 0.01 in)	13.8	10.2	11.8	13.0	12.2	10.1	9.9	9.5	9.5	10.9	11.4	12.0	134.3
Average snowy days (≥ 0.1 in)	9.8	7.2	4.8	1.1	0.1	0.0	0.0	0.0	0.0	0.0	1.7	5.4	30.1
Source: NOAA

== Demographics ==
Historical population
Census	Pop.	Note	%±
1850	1,302		—
1870	1,768		—
1880	3,057		72.9%
1890	4,748		55.3%
1900	6,576		38.5%
1910	7,707		17.2%
1920	9,488		23.1%
1930	13,497		42.3%
1940	14,389		6.6%
1950	17,027		18.3%
1960	21,016		23.4%
1970	20,476		−2.6%
1980	18,991		−7.3%
1990	18,405		−3.1%
2000	17,312		−5.9%
2010	16,314		−5.8%
2020	15,697		−3.8%
2023 (est.)	15,378		−2.0%
U.S. Decennial Census

=== Racial and ethnic composition ===
Mount Clemens city, Michigan – Racial and ethnic composition Note: the US Census treats Hispanic/Latino as an ethnic category. This table excludes Latinos from the racial categories and assigns them to a separate category. Hispanics/Latinos may be of any race.
Race / Ethnicity (NH = Non-Hispanic)	Pop 2000	Pop 2010	Pop 2020	% 2000	% 2010	% 2020
White alone (NH)	12,897	11,150	10,142	74.50%	68.35%	64.61%
Black or African American alone (NH)	3,375	3,993	3,775	19.50%	24.48%	24.05%
Native American or Alaska Native alone (NH)	113	44	45	0.65%	0.27%	0.29%
Asian alone (NH)	85	79	88	0.49%	0.48%	0.56%
Native Hawaiian or Pacific Islander alone (NH)	3	5	2	0.02%	0.03%	0.01%
Other race alone (NH)	41	33	106	0.24%	0.20%	0.68%
Mixed race or Multiracial (NH)	394	533	927	2.28%	3.27%	5.91%
Hispanic or Latino (any race)	404	477	612	2.33%	2.92%	3.90%
Total	17,312	16,314	15,697	100.00%	100.00%	100.00%

=== 2020 census ===
As of the 2020 census, Mount Clemens had a population of 15,697. The median age was 40.7 years. 19.2% of residents were under the age of 18 and 16.7% of residents were 65 years of age or older. For every 100 females there were 103.0 males, and for every 100 females age 18 and over there were 102.7 males age 18 and over.

100.0% of residents lived in urban areas, while 0.0% lived in rural areas.

There were 6,982 households in Mount Clemens, of which 23.7% had children under the age of 18 living in them. Of all households, 27.6% were married-couple households, 28.4% were households with a male householder and no spouse or partner present, and 35.7% were households with a female householder and no spouse or partner present. About 41.9% of all households were made up of individuals and 14.5% had someone living alone who was 65 years of age or older.

There were 7,432 housing units, of which 6.1% were vacant. The homeowner vacancy rate was 1.9% and the rental vacancy rate was 4.4%.

Racial composition as of the 2020 census
Race	Number	Percent
White	10,335	65.8%
Black or African American	3,799	24.2%
American Indian and Alaska Native	58	0.4%
Asian	90	0.6%
Native Hawaiian and Other Pacific Islander	2	0.0%
Some other race	305	1.9%
Two or more races	1,108	7.1%

=== 2010 census ===
As of the census of 2010, there were 16,314 people, 6,714 households, and 3,542 families living in the city. The population density was 4,008.4 inhabitants per square mile (1,547.7/km^{2}). There were 7,582 housing units at an average density of 1,862.9 per square mile (719.3/km^{2}). The racial makeup of the city was 70.0% White, 24.8% African American, 0.3% Native American, 0.5% Asian, 0.8% from other races, and 3.6% from two or more races. Hispanic or Latino residents of any race were 2.9% of the population.

There were 6,714 households, of which 25.9% had children under the age of 18 living with them, 30.6% were married couples living together, 16.4% had a female householder with no husband present, 5.7% had a male householder with no wife present, and 47.2% were non-families. 39.7% of all households were made up of individuals, and 13% had someone living alone who was 65 years of age or older. The average household size was 2.19 and the average family size was 2.96.

The median age in the city was 38.3 years. 20.6% of residents were under the age of 18; 9.7% were between the ages of 18 and 24; 28.9% were from 25 to 44; 27.8% were from 45 to 64; and 13% were 65 years of age or older. The gender makeup of the city was 51.5% male and 48.5% female.

=== 2000 census ===
As of the census of 2000, there were 17,312 people, 7,073 households, and 3,854 families living in the city. The population density was 4,107.0 inhabitants per square mile (1,585.7/km^{2}). There were 7,546 housing units at an average density of 1,790.2 per square mile (691.2/km^{2}). The racial makeup of the city was 75.79% White, 19.61% African American, 0.73% Native American, 0.49% Asian, 0.02% Pacific Islander, 0.76% from other races, and 2.59% from two or more races. Hispanic or Latino residents of any race were 2.33% of the population.

There were 7,073 households, out of which 24.7% had children under the age of 18 living with them, 35.2% were married couples living together, 14.7% had a female householder with no husband present, and 45.5% were non-families. 39.2% of all households were made up of individuals, and 13.2% had someone living alone who was 65 years of age or older. The average household size was 2.21 and the average family size was 2.99.

In the city, 21.6% of the population was under the age of 18, 9.0% was from 18 to 24, 34.3% from 25 to 44, 21.7% from 45 to 64, and 13.4% was 65 years of age or older. The median age was 36 years. For every 100 females, there were 107.1 males. For every 100 females age 18 and over, there were 105.8 males.

The median income for a household in the city was $37,856, and the median income for a family was $50,518. Males had a median income of $41,005 versus $27,896 for females. The per capita income for the city was $21,741. About 10.0% of families and 14.1% of the population were below the poverty line, including 20.1% of those under age 18 and 11.9% of those age 65 or over.

== Arts and culture ==
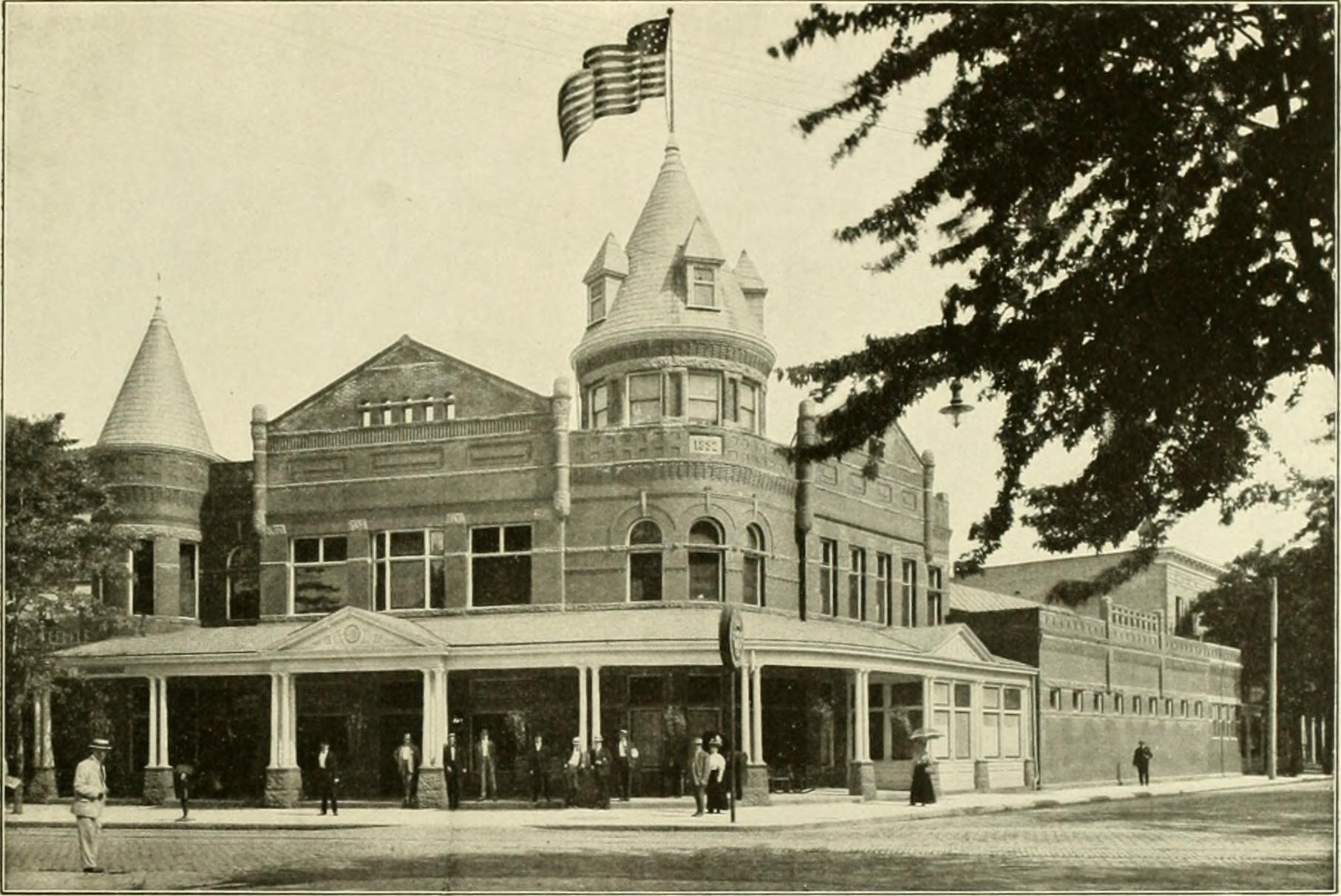
Mount Clemens, 1913

- The Anton Art Center is a community gallery located in a former Carnegie library.
- The Mock Turtle Press, and American Road Magazine, are published in Mount Clemens.
- The Emerald Theatre is a concert venue in Mount Clemens.

== Government ==
The city government is composed of a mayor, the current being Laura Kropp, and a city council. The city has been facing financial hardships for some time. Approximately 42% of properties in the city are tax-exempt, resulting in lost revenue of $1.2 million. In an attempt to raise funds to combat a $960,000 budget deficit for 2010, former Mayor Barb Dempsey solicited donations to the city's general fund from tax-exempt organizations like churches, schools and a hospital, in order to pay for services like fire protection, streetlights and roads. The city already disbanded the 113-year-old police department in 2005 to cut costs. The Macomb County Sheriff's Office now provides primary policing services in Mount Clemens. The deficit is projected to reach $1.5 million in 2011.

== Education ==
- Mount Clemens Community School District operates public schools, including Mount Clemens High School.

== Infrastructure ==
=== Transportation ===
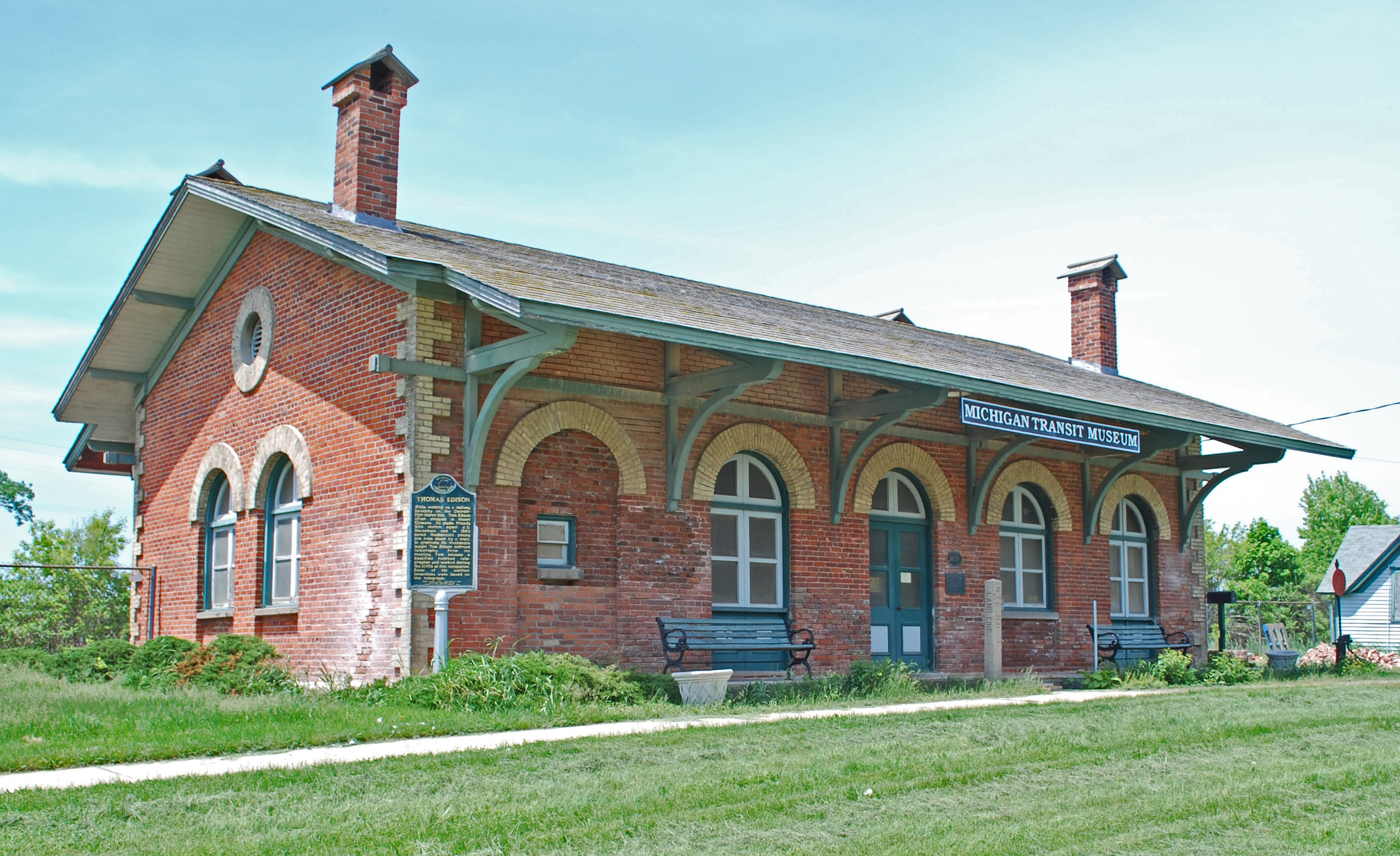
Michigan Transit Museum, former Grand Trunk Western Mount Clemens Station

Highways include:

- I-94
- M-3 (Gratiot Avenue)
- M-59 (Hall Road)
- M-97 (Groesbeck Highway)

Bus service is provided by the Suburban Mobility Authority for Regional Transportation.

Canadian National provides Class 1 Freight service to Mount Clemens with the old Grand Trunk Western Detroit to Port Huron line previously for passenger rail services. The Mount Clemens Station that used to provide passenger rail service now operates the Michigan Transit Museum. The station was active between 1859 and 1954.

== Notable people ==
- Brian Adams, South Carolina state senator
- Chauncey G. Cady, farmer and politician
- Horace H. Cady, farmer and politician
- Dean Cain, football player and actor
- Harley High Cartter, lawyer and politician
- Rickey Clark, baseball pitcher
- Dick Enberg, sports announcer
- Mike Fanning, football player
- Paul Feig, actor and director
- Adrienne Frantz, actress and singer-songwriter
- Rich Froning Jr., CrossFit athlete and coach
- Edward Tony Green, bass player
- Terrie Hall, anti-smoking activist
- Rufus Wilber Hitchcock, educator, newspaper editor, and Minnesota state legislator
- Ian Hornak, painter and printmaker
- Mike Ignasiak, baseball pitcher
- Loraine Immen, philanthropist, elocutionist, author, social leader
- Chuck Inglish, rapper
- Connie Kalitta, drag racing driver
- Scott Kamieniecki, baseball pitcher
- David Kircus, football player
- Arnold Klein, dermatologist for Michael Jackson
- Tracy Leslie, NASCAR driver
- George F. Lewis, journalist and newspaper proprietor
- John Lutz, television writer and actor
- Tommy Milton, racing driver
- Owen Murphy, songwriter and Broadway musical composer and lyricist
- Frank Nazar, ice hockey player
- Dan Nugent, football player
- Lawrence B. Schook, academic
- Richard A. Searfoss, astronaut
- Lary Sorensen, baseball pitcher
- Eric Spoutz, art dealer
- Uncle Kracker (Matthew Shafer), singer-songwriter
- Allen Henry Vigneron, Roman Catholic bishop
- Wally Weber, football player and coach
