= Candice Goodwin =

South African scientific consultant, author and paranormal investigator

Candice Michelle Goodwin
- Born: Cape Town
- Education: University of Cape Town (MSc and PhD)
- Known for: Code 8 Enter Entropy; Kat Loves LA
- Scientific career
- Workplaces: KAPA Biosystems; Patheon; Leica Microsystems
- Thesis: The laccase from Micromonospora sp. 044 30-1 as a biocatalyst for synthesis of antioxidant compounds (2010)
- Doctoral advisor: Stephanie G. Burton; Sue Harrison

Candice Michelle Goodwin is a South African-born chemical engineer and microbiologist turned writer, producer, podcaster and paranormal investigator. Her microbiology research included the discovery of new bacteria and infectious diseases. Between 2014 and 2017 Goodwin was media coordinator for the United Nations' Space Generation Advisory Council.

Goodwin is founder and director of RWC Productions, a screenwriting, content editing and media consultancy and was involved in the production of the film Code 8. She has long been an advocate of STEM education programmes and is involved in scientific advocacy, including the Inspire Stem Education initiative in conjunction with the University of Queensland.

== Education and career in biotechnology ==
Goodwin was born and raised in Cape Town, South Africa. She attended University of Cape Town (UCT) where she completed a BSc (with distinction) in Biotechnology & Microbiology, followed by a BSc (Hons) and MSc (with distinction) in Molecular and Cell Biology with a thesis entitled "Investigations into Actinomycetes Isolated from Coastal Environments, with a Special Emphasis on the Genus Micromonospora". During her time at UCT, Goodwin was a visiting researcher at the Centre of Marine Biology, Baltimore, USA.

Goodwin completed her PhD in chemical engineering at UCT, with research conducted both at UCT and the Istituto di Chimica del Riconoscimento Molecolare (The Institute of Molecular Recognition) in Milan, Italy. Her PhD thesis, published in 2010, was titled: "The laccase from Micromonospora sp. 044 30-1 as a biocatalyst for synthesis of antioxidant compounds."

From 2010 Goodwin worked for KAPA Biosystems, a subsidiary of Roche SA in Cape Town, and from 2012 at DSM Biologics in Brisbane, Australia, in various aspects of quality control, manufacturing and process development. From 2014 she was employed by Patheon (a division of Thermo Fisher Scientific) and in 2015 she worked as a consultant for PharmOut and BJP laboratories (engineering and architectural consultancies) in Queensland. From late 2016 Goodwin was appointed territory manager for Leica Microsystems in Queensland.

Goodwin is Outreach Manager at the University of Queensland Centre for Microscopy and Micro Analysis in conjunction with Inspire Stem Education, a corporate social responsibility initiative of Hitachi which involves taking an Hitachi Scanning electron microscope to schools to encourage students to study STEM subjects.

Since July 2016 she has been a member of the State Emergency Service, a primary responder organisation for storms and flood events.

== Astronomical interests ==
From an early age Goodwin had an interest in space exploration and from January 2008 to June 2012, she was appointed a Student and Young Professionals representative for the South African Astronomical Observatory in Cape Town. She was involved in a range of activities including the South African Schools Rocketry Camp (a mentorship programme), the first annual South African Space Association Congress in 2010, and the Space Generation Congress and International Astronomical Congress in 2011.

From December 2014 to November 2017, Goodwin was appointed media coordinator for the Space Generation Advisory Council (part of the United Nations Programme on Space Applications) in Vienna, Austria. She acted as producer for the promotional videos of the Poland Mars Analog Simulator.

== Writing, publishing, television ==
Goodwin's experiences in film, TV and publishing started in 2000 when she was editor writer for The Exponent, a publication of the UCT Science Students' Council and was followed by screenwriting for the SABC in 2001, movie reviews for Heat magazine in 2005 and having photographs she had taken published in the "Cape Argus".

In 2010 she completed the NQF level 5, Visual impact training for Production, Camera & Sound Assistants. She founded Rebel With Cause Productions in 2000 and since 2015 has been involved in the production of the promotional videos of the Poland Mars Analog Simulator in 2017, a YouTube TV-series, Deep Six, web-series Kat Loves LA, feature film Code 8 and numerous other productions. She is also a contributing editor to the YouTube channels "Voice of TV".

Since 2012 Goodwin has been a regular visitor, guest, panelist and has appeared as member of the press at various science fiction and fantasy conventions and film festivals including Oz Comic Con, Supernova, Armageddon Expo and the Gold Coast Film Festival. In 2016 she became a consultant to the Science & Entertainment Exchange, a programme of the National Academy of Sciences that connects entertainment industry professionals with scientists and engineers. In the same year she joined the International Screenwriters' Association as a screenwriting consultant.

In 2018 she joined the advocacy body Women in Film & Television in Australia and in 2019 became a member of the Australian Society of Magicians. In November 2019 Goodwin started Robin's Nest Investigations as a division of RWC Productions for which she acts as a freelance investigator for factual and paranormal investigations, historical documentary investigations and ghost-hunting.

=== Enter Entropy ===
In 2017 Goodwin participated in the "Finish Line Script Competition" with a TV screenplay called Enter Entropy, a work of science fiction. In 2018 Enter Entropy was entered into the "All Genre Screenplay Contest" and Goodwin was a WritersForWriters Female Fellowship finalist. The screenplay was published in ebook format by Dizzy EMU Publishing in 2018. In 2020 her screenplay was listed as In Development on IMDb.

Her second screenplay book Enter Entropy: Volume 2 was published in 2019 and includes magic deception, the science of fight choreography and ghost-hunting, among other topics. The third volume in the series, Enter Entropy: Volume 3 was published in July 2020.

== Personal life ==
In 2012 Goodwin emigrated to Brisbane, Australia..

== Selected scientific publications ==
=== Journals ===
- Everest, Gareth J.; le Roes-Hill, Marilize; Omorogie, Clifford; Cheung, Shuk-Kwan; Cook, Andrew E.; Goodwin, Candice M.; Meyers, Paul R. (20 November 2012). "Amycolatopsis umgeniensis sp. nov., isolated from soil from the banks of the Umgeni River in South Africa". Antonie van Leeuwenhoek. 103 (3). Springer Science and Business Media LLC: 673–681. doi:10.1007/s10482-012-9851-7. ISSN 0003-6072. PMID 23180373. S2CID 2422664.
- Navarra, Cristina; Goodwin, Candice; Burton, Stephanie; Danieli, Bruno; Riva, Sergio (2010). "Laccase-mediated oxidation of phenolic derivatives". Journal of Molecular Catalysis B: Enzymatic. 65 (1–4). Elsevier BV: 52–57. doi:10.1016/j.molcatb.2009.12.016. ISSN 1381-1177.
- le Roes, Marilize; Goodwin, Candice M.; Meyers, Paul R. (2008). "Gordonia lacunae sp. nov., isolated from an estuary". Systematic and Applied Microbiology. 31 (1). Elsevier BV: 17–23. doi:10.1016/j.syapm.2007.10.001. ISSN 0723-2020. PMID 18022777.
- Wood, S.A.; Kirby, B.M.; Goodwin, C.M.; Le Roes, M.; Meyers, P.R. (2007). "PCR screening reveals unexpected antibiotic biosynthetic potential in Amycolatopsis sp. strain UM16". Journal of Applied Microbiology. 102 (1). Wiley: 245–253. doi:10.1111/j.1365-2672.2006.03043.x. ISSN 1364-5072. PMID 17184341.
- Meyers, Paul R.; Goodwin, Candice M.; Bennett, Jessica A.; Aken, Bronwen L.; Price, Claire E.; van Rooyen, Jason M. (1 September 2004). "Streptomyces africanus sp. nov., a novel streptomycete with blue aerial mycelium". International Journal of Systematic and Evolutionary Microbiology. 54 (5). Microbiology Society: 1531–1535. doi:10.1099/ijs.0.02738-0. ISSN 1466-5026. PMID 15388706.

=== Books ===
- Goodwin, C. (2011). Environmental Micromonospora Strains: Isolation, Identification Key, New Species Descriptions, and Novel Antibiotic Discovery. LAP Lambert Academic Publishing. ISBN 978-3-8465-9548-0.
