= Cutty =

Cutty may refer to:

== People ==
- Cutty Cutshall, American jazz trombonist Robert Cutshall (1911–1968)
- Cutty Ranks, Jamaican dancehall musician Philip Thomas (born 1965)
- Cutty (rapper), a rapper featured on T.O.K.'s Bombrush Hour

== Other uses ==
- Cutty grass, a common name for several grasses
- Dennis "Cutty" Wise, a fictional character on the HBO drama The Wire

== See also ==
- Cuddy (disambiguation)
- Cuttie stool, a Scottish milking stool
- Cutty Sark (disambiguation)
