= Candice =

Candice is a given name and a variant spelling of the name Candace.

== People ==
Notable people with the name include:

- Candice Accola, American actress (The Vampire Diaries)
- Candice Carty-Williams, British writer
- Candice Bergen, American actress (Murphy Brown)
- Candice Bergen (politician), Canadian MP and minister
- Candice Bridge, American chemist
- Candice Farmer, British underwater fashion photographer
- Candice Glover, American singer
- Candice Goodwin, chemical engineer and microbiologist turned writer, producer, podcaster and paranormal investigator
- Candice Hillebrand (also known as Candîce), singer from South Africa
- Candice Jones-Simmons, Trinidad and Tobago politician
- Candice Michelle, American professional wrestler, model, actress with WWE
- Candice Miller, American politician
- Candice Mwakalyelye (born 1986), TV and radio broadcaster
- Candice Night, American musician, lead singer for Blackmore's Night
- Candice Odgers, American psychologist
- Candice Patton, American actress
- Candice Swanepoel, South African model known for her work with Victoria's Secret
- Candice Warner, Australian ironwoman and surf lifesaver
- Candice LeRae (born 1985), WWE Professional wrestler

== Fictional characters ==
- Candice Pergande, Jonathan Kent's girlfriend in Superman & Lois
- Candice Singleton-Ramirez, a character in Close Enough
- Candice Wilmer, in Heroes
- Candice (MÄR), recurring antagonist in the manga and anime series MÄR
- Candice White Ardlay, main character of Candy Candy
- Candice Catnipp is a Sternritter who has the epithet "T" for "The Thunderbolt" in the Bleach manga
