= Cady =

Cady may refer to:

== Places ==
=== United States ===
- Cady, Wisconsin, a town
- Cady Mountains, California
- Cady Pond, Massachusetts
- Cady Lake, South Dakota
- Camp Cady, California, a United States Army camp in 1860–1861 and 1866–1871

=== Elsewhere ===
- Cady, County Fermanagh, a townland in Magheraculmoney parish, County Fermanagh, Northern Ireland
- Cady (river), France
- Cady Nunatak, Marie Byrd Land, Antarctica

== People ==
- Cady (given name)
- Cady (surname)

== Fictional characters ==
- Max Cady, the villain of John D. MacDonald's novel The Executioners and two film adaptations, both titled Cape Fear
- Cady Heron, main protagonist of the 2004 teen film Mean Girls, played by Lindsay Lohan
- Cady Longmire, daughter of the fictional Sheriff Walt Longmire in a series of mystery novels

== See also ==
- Caddy (disambiguation)
- Cadi (disambiguation)
- Kady, a given name
