= Steve Neal (historian) =

American journalist and historian

- Born: 1949; Coos Bay, Oregon, U.S.
- Died: February 18, 2004 (aged 54–55); Hinsdale, Illinois, U.S.
- Occupations: Journalist, historian

Steve Neal (1949 in Coos Bay, Oregon – February 18, 2004, in Hinsdale, Illinois) was an American journalist and historian, noted for political columns and coverage of American electoral history. He is best known for Dark Horse, an authorized biography of 1940 presidential candidate Wendell Willkie.

== Biography ==
=== Journalist ===
After studying at the University of Oregon and Columbia University, Neal served as a bylined reporter and columnist for the Oregon Journal, the Philadelphia Inquirer and the Chicago Tribune, rising to the level of White House correspondent for the Tribune. From 1987 until 2004, he worked with the Chicago Sun-Times, writing a frequent political column for their editorial page. In 1999, a collection of Neal's columns, Rolling on the River, was published by the Southern Illinois University Press.

=== Historian ===
External videos
- Presentation by Neal on Harry and Ike: The Partnership That Remade the Postwar Period, September 20, 2001, C-SPAN
- Booknotes interview with Steve Neal on Harry and Ike, February 10, 2002, C-SPAN
- Presentation by Neal on Eleanor and Harry: The Correspondence, September 9, 2002, C-SPAN

Neal published biographies and biographical material on Dwight D. Eisenhower, Oregon Gov. Tom McCall, and 1940 presidential candidate Wendell Willkie; he also edited collections of the letters and speeches of Harry S. Truman. His hero, however, was Abraham Lincoln, and he campaigned for public support to transfer Lincoln's papers and memorabilia to a scholarly, nonpolitical library and museum that would serve as a focus for public education of the life of the 16th President of the United States.

== Death and honors ==
Neal was found dead at his Hinsdale home on February 18, 2004, after having inhaled a fatal quantity of carbon monoxide. The Abraham Lincoln Presidential Library and Museum, located in Springfield, Illinois, opened to the public in 2005. The library has named its reading room the Steve Neal Reading Room in honor of Neal's work and advocacy for the creation of the library.
