= Mount Clemens Sugar Company =

Michigan company

Coordinates: 42.5943°N 82.8615°W

The Mount Clemens Sugar Company was a local venture in Mount Clemens, Michigan, which processed sugar beets into refined sugar, and which operated from 1901 until 1950.

== History ==
Enticed by the success of a similar operation in Bay City, Michigan, in 1898, the Mount Clemens Chamber of Commerce sent Sheriff William F. Nank on a fact-finding mission. His report led to the foundation of the Mount Clemens Sugar Company, initially known as Macomb Sugar.

”A sixty-five acre site along the Clinton River was purchased, and a track was run to the location from the Grand Trunk Railway, at a cost of $47,000. The contract for construction of the mill was let to Kilby Manufacturing for a sum of $557,500. The operating staff was brought in from various places and included: superintendent Edward Wolfbauer, expert chemist; assistant superintendent Herman Wiese of Stettin, Germany; and chief chemist William Moxon of Marine City.”

Local farmers were enlisted to plant a certain portion of their acreage with sugar beets. This crop was subsequently processed into granulated sugar and molasses. The first year's production was unprofitable due to harvests delayed by heavy rains as well as substandard beets.

”The second year's campaign was also unsuccessful and the company was unable to meet interest and mortgage payments. The company was reorganized in 1904 and 1905, and as a result Captain James E. Davidson of Bay City became the sole owner and changed the name to Mount Clemens Sugar Company.”

The company enjoyed several years of successful seasons, but a serious downturn occurred in 1913, when American trade policy allowed foreign sugar to enter the market free of tariff, “thereby threatening to destroy the domestic sugar industry. The trade policy was repealed when World War I engendered a sugar shortage and the U.S. Treasury felt the loss of revenue from the tariff.”

On 9 January 1920, a federal grand jury in Detroit handed down an indictment of the Mount Clemens Sugar Company and President James Davidson, charging sale of sugar at the excessive price of seventeen cents per pound.

”After Captain Davidson died in 1929, the Mount Clemens Sugar Company went through a number of changes of management. In 1932, the factory was leased to a group of Detroit businessmen. However, when they did not reap the profits they expected, they turned over the lease to Charles Coryell and associates the following year. Coryell operated the plant profitably from 1933-1939. In 1940, the Beet Growers Association took over the lease for one campaign only, and in 1941 the Keiser interests of New York operated the plant for one campaign under the name of Southeastern Sugar Company. The Davidson estate then put the plant up for sale and accepted the offer of Franklin Sugar Company of Preston, Idaho. Franklin produced sugar during the war years then leased the plant to Doughnut Corporation of America in 1946. Doughnut used the plant to produce dextrose, but also managed to process a small tonnage of beets. The factory sat idle in 1949 and processed its last beet campaign in 1950.”

Sugar production in Mount Clemens was given up as a lost cause after 1950. Freight rates for transporting beets had risen, the acreage available had dwindled as agricultural land was sold off for other industry and residential development. The War Department appropriated 200 acres of the company's own land for expansion of Selfridge Air Force Base, and also required the factory to cut 100 feet off of the plant smokestack, the loss of which draft necessitated the installation of fans. The plant was subsequently abandoned, dismantled and salvaged.

”Franklin Sugar sold the property and building to Detroit attorney John Palumbo in 1959, and Palumbo had the abandoned factory building torn down in June, 1962.”
