= Lazarus Dokora =

Zimbabwean politician

Lazarus Dagwa Kambarami Dokora (born 3 November 1957) was the Zimbabwe Minister of Education, Sport and Culture. On 27 November 2017, Emmerson Mnangagwa, who succeeded in ousting President Robert Mugabe, announced the dissolution of the Zimbabwe Cabinet, leaving only Patrick Chinamasa and Simbarashe Mumbengegwi as acting ministers of Finance and Foreign Affairs respectively. Dokora was an MP from Rushinga National Assembly, before losing to Wonder Mashange in the general elections in 2013. He was appointed as the Minister of Primary and Secondary Education on 30 November 2017 by President Emmerson Mnangagwa. He was dropped by Mnangagwa as Minister for Primary and Secondary Education on 2 December 2017 amidst Zimbabweans on social media and radio shows criticizing him, blaming him of poor performance and undermining the country's education system. He was replaced by his deputy minister Paul Mavima. In relation to the issue with radio stations, he was interviewed by Farai Mwakutuya. The interview took place during a talk show called Head-On on radio ZI-FM.

He was placed on the European Union sanctions list from 2007 to 2011.
