= Cuddy (surname) =

Cuddy is an Irish surname. Notable people with the surname include:

- Amy Cuddy (born 1972), American social psychologist
- Alison Cuddy, American radio host
- David Cuddy (born 1952), American businessman and Republican Party politician
- Devin Cuddy (born 1987), Canadian singer-songwriter
- Jim Cuddy (born 1955), Canadian singer-songwriter
- Lola Cuddy (born 1939), Canadian music psychologist
- P.J. Cuddy, hurling player with Laois and Camross
- Paul Cuddy (born 1959), English footballer
- Scott Cuddy, American politician
- Susan Ahn Cuddy (1915–2015), the first female gunnery officer in the United States Navy
- Thomas J. Cuddy, former chief of police in Los Angeles, California

Fictional characters include

- Lisa Cuddy, in the television series House

== See also ==
- Caddy (name)
