= Eileen Mackevich =

American historian (1939–2022)

Eileen R. Mackevich (May 18, 1939 – March 14, 2022) was an American historian who was the executive director of the Abraham Lincoln Presidential Library and Museum from 2010 to 2015. She was unanimously recommended for this position by the Board of Trustees for the Illinois Historic Preservation Agency (IHPA), and the title was officially bestowed upon her in December 2010, by Illinois Governor Pat Quinn. A radio journalist, she had previously served as executive director of the national Lincoln Bicentennial Commission, and was founder of the Chicago Humanities Festival.

== Education ==
Mackevich earned her bachelor's degree from the University of Pennsylvania, Master's degree in British history at Northeastern Illinois University, and took additional graduate coursework at the University of Illinois at Chicago. She has honorary doctorates from Dominican University and Lincoln College.

== Career ==
Mackevich co-founded the Chicago Humanities Festival with Richard J. Franke. She served as president from 1989 to 2005.

From 2006 to 2009, Mackevich was the executive director of the Abraham Lincoln Bicentennial Commission.

For 18 years, Mackevich had a career as a broadcast journalist and talk show host on WBEZ, Chicago Public Radio.

In 2004, she was named one of the "100 Most Powerful Women in Chicago" by the Chicago Sun Times.

== Personal life ==
Mackevich died on March 14, 2022, at the age of 82.

== Honors and awards ==
Mackevich was a member of the Order of the British Empire.
