= Roche Applied Science =

- Company type: Public
- Traded as: NYSE: PKI
- Industry: Health Sciences, Pharmacology, Biotechnology
- Headquarters: Penzberg, Upper Bavaria, Germany
- Products: Analytical instruments, Genetic Screening tools, Life & Analytical Science software and instruments
- Website: www.roche-applied-science.com

Roche Applied Science was a global business entity in the biotechnology sector that produces reagents and systems for life sciences research, with an emphasis on molecular genetics and cell biology research needs.

== Scope of business ==
Roche Applied Science produced reagents and systems for related to DNA sequencing, microarrays, gene expression, and cell analysis. Important fields of application of the company's products are the research and development areas of the biotechnology and pharmaceutical industries. The company also offers reagents and systems for the pharmaceuticals and diagnostics industries.

== Locations ==
The company's headquarters was in Penzberg in Upper Bavaria, Germany; other main sites are Mannheim, Germany, Rotkreuz in Switzerland, Madison, WI, Pleasanton, CA, and Branford, CT in the United States.

== History ==
Roche Applied Science was founded in 1859 as Boehringer Mannheim, a developer of rare chemicals and pharmaceuticals. In the 1950s, the bioreagents product line was developed according to the company’s own needs in diagnostics research. They were the first commercially important producer of restriction enzymes, they were the first supplier of Klenow enzyme for Sanger sequencing, and they are the only supplier of a system for the non-radioactive labeling of nucleic acid.

== Instrument development ==
As of 2011, Roche Applied Science's instrumentation products included genome sequencing platforms, an instrument to perform automated polymerase chain reactions (PCR) and product analyses, and a system for real-time, label-free cellular analysis for use in cell invasion/migration studies.

Roche has a history of both developing new technologies, and licensing them from other companies.

== Restructuring ==
In the second quarter of 2013, Roche announced plans to integrate the products of the Applied Science business area within the Molecular and Professional Diagnostics business areas. Genome sequencing, formerly a part of the Applied Science portfolio, was moved into Molecular Diagnostics division. In 2013 impairment charges for goodwill and intangible assets of 35 million Swiss francs and 12 million Swiss francs were incurred for the Applied Science restructuring.

== See also ==
- 454 Life Sciences
- Roche Diagnostics
