= Cady Pond =

- Location within Massachusetts
- Location: Middlesex County, Massachusetts
- Coordinates: 42.5977°N 71.5581°W
- Type: lake

Cady Pond is a lake in Middlesex County, in the U.S. state of Massachusetts.

Cady Pond was named after Nicholas Cady, a pioneer citizen.

Nicholas Cady [of Suffolk county England] and wife Judith Knapp Cady did resided near the pond in the last years of their lives. Died prior to 1712. There is no marker of their graves.
