= Joseph Caddy =

English footballer

Personal information
- Full name: Joseph Moyle Caddy
- Date of birth: 1885
- Place of birth: Wendron, England
- Date of death: 8 April 1946 (aged 60–61)
- Place of death: Plymouth, England
- Position: Outside left

Senior career*
Years	Team	Apps	(Gls)
–1910	Torpoint Athletic		
1910–1912	Plymouth Argyle	3	(0)
1912–	Torpoint Athletic		
- * Club domestic league appearances and goals

Joseph Moyle Caddy (1885 – 8 April 1946) was an English professional footballer who played for Plymouth Argyle in the Southern Football League as an outside-left.

== Personal life ==
Caddy served as a corporal in the Devonshire Regiment and the Worcestershire Regiment during the First World War. He suffered a gunshot wound to the head in May 1918.

== Career statistics ==
Appearances and goals by club, season and competition
Club	Season	League			FA Cup		Total	
Club	Season	Division	Apps	Goals	Apps	Goals	Apps	Goals
Plymouth Argyle	1909–10	Southern League First Division	2	0	0	0	2	0
Plymouth Argyle	1910–11	Southern League First Division	1	0	0	0	1	0
Career total			3	0	0	0	3	0
