= Mandy Candy =

Brazilian social media personality

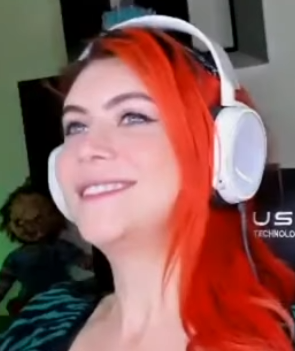
- Mandy Candy in 2020
- Born: Amanda Guimarães Borges; 16 June 1988 (age 38); Gravataí, Rio Grande do Sul
- Years active: 2015–present

YouTube information
- Channel: Mandy Candy
- Subscribers: 2.13 million
- Views: 260 million
- Last updated: 21 March 2026

Amanda Guimarães Borges, better known as Mandy Candy (born in Gravataí on 16 June 1988), is a Brazilian YouTuber. She is considered a representative of trans women on the platform and a pioneer in creating digital content about trans people in Brazil.

Mandy is the first Brazilian transgender YouTuber and has the highest number of subscribers among transgender YouTubers, as of August 2017.

== Biography ==
Amanda Guimarães Borges was born in Gravataí, in the state of Rio Grande do Sul, and has shown gender dysphoria since childhood. At 19, Amanda came out as a transgender woman to her mother. Her mother, siblings, and friends all showed their support for her coming out.

She worked in call centers, resold products online, and saved money to undergo gender affirmation surgery in Thailand in 2012 with Dr. Kamol.

Mandy claims she experiences transphobia daily.

== Career ==
Mandy Candy began her career as a digital influencer in 2014, when she lived in China. Her channel started with gameplay videos, but later evolved to focus on her life story. Since then, on her YouTube channel, Mandy talks about her daily life and also has a series of videos in which she explains issues related to gender transition. The videos respond to comments from followers on her other social media platforms. Her videos also cover fashion, travel, and pop culture.

In 2019, Mandy returned to Brazil and opened a beauty salon called Bem Garota in Porto Alegre. In 2021, in the context of the COVID-19 pandemic, she presented a virtual event at a LGBTQ parade. In 2024, she launched the podcast Hora do Date with her then-fiancé, Marcelo Soares.
