= Caddo Public Schools =

Caddo Public Schools can refer to:

- Caddo Public Schools (Oklahoma); see List of school districts in Oklahoma
- Caddo Public Schools (Louisiana)

== See also ==
- Caddo Mills Independent School District, Caddo Mills, Texas
