= Bertha Chapman Cady =

Entomologist and science educator

- Born: July 5, 1873
- Died: January 6, 1956 (aged 82)
- Education: Stanford University

Bertha Louise Chapman Cady (July 5, 1873 – January 6, 1956) was an American entomologist and educator born in Santa Barbara, California. Her parents were Truman Fletcher Chapman and Mary Elizabeth Furlong Chapman and she had one older sister named Elizabeth Corinne Chapman.

== Life ==
Born Bertha Louise Chapman, she received a Bachelor of Arts in 1895 and a Master of Arts in 1902 from Stanford University. She taught high school biology from 1900 to 1907. From 1907 to 1909, she was an assistant in nature study at the University of Chicago. She then became an instructor in biology at California State Teacher's College. From 1921 to 1923, Cady was a lecturer at Stanford University. In 1923, she earned a PhD in entomology from Stanford with her thesis entitled A Study of the Effects of Feeding Insect Infested Cereal Food Products to Animals. From 1924 to 1936, she worked for the Girl Scouts of the USA and in the mid-twenties held the title of Naturalist there. Also, from 1926 to 1929, she was president of the American Nature Study Society.

She married psychologist Vernon Mosher Cady; the couple wrote a book The Way Life Begins: An introduction to Sex Education (1917) which was published by the American Social Hygiene Association. The book sold well and went through several reprints.

Other publications by her include The Girl Scout Leader's Nature Guide (1929).

== Bibliography ==
- Kellogg, Vernon L.; Chapman, Bertha L. (1899). "Mallophaga from Birds of California". Occasional Papers of the California Academy of Sciences. Vol. 6. San Francisco: California Academy of Sciences. pp. 53–143.
- Cady, Bertha Chapman; Cady, Vernon Mosher (1917). The Way Life Begins: An Introduction to Sex Education. New York: American Social Hygiene Association.
- Cady, Bertha Chapman (1923). A Study of the Effects of Feeding Insect Infested Cereal Food Products to Animals (Thesis).
- Cady, Bertha Chapman (1928). "The American Nature Study Society". Science. 68 (1773): 614. doi:10.1126/science.68.1773.614.a. ISSN 0036-8075. JSTOR 1652978.
- Cady, Bertha Chapman (1929). The Girl Scout Leader's Nature Guide. New York: Girl Scouts. OCLC 79700350.
- Cady, Bertha Chapman (1936). "Winter Bouquets". The American Journal of Nursing. 36 (10): 1018–1020. doi:10.2307/3413576. ISSN 0002-936X. JSTOR 3413576.
