= Candace Introcaso =

American academic administrator (1953–2023)

Sister Candace Introcaso

7th President of La Roche University
- In office April 8, 2005 – May 22, 2023
- Preceded by: Monsignor William Kerr

Personal details
- Born: December 8, 1953
- Died: May 22, 2023 (aged 69)
- Education: Fordham University; Shippensburg University; Claremont Graduate University

Candace Mary Introcaso (December 8, 1953 – May 22, 2023) was an American academic administrator who was the President of La Roche University, a private Catholic education institution in Pittsburgh, Pennsylvania.

== Biography ==
Candace Mary Introcaso was born on December 8, 1953. She was elected the seventh President of La Roche University by the Board of Trustees in 2004. As a member of the Sisters of Divine Providence, Introcaso began her involvement in higher education in the late 1980s, serving on both the faculty and the administrative staff at La Roche from 1986–91.

Introcaso went on to serve as assistant vice president for academic affairs at Heritage College, located in the Yakama Indian Reservation in Toppenish, Washington, from 1997 until 1999. Her next position was vice president for planning and assessment at Barry University in Miami, Florida.

Introcaso received her Ph.D. in higher education administration from Claremont Graduate University, where she received the Hausam-Fisk Award for Excellence in Higher Education. Introcaso also held an MA in sociology from Fordham University and a BA in psychology from Shippensburg University.

Introcaso died on May 22, 2023, at the age of 69.
