= Chicago Humanities Festival =

American non-profit organization

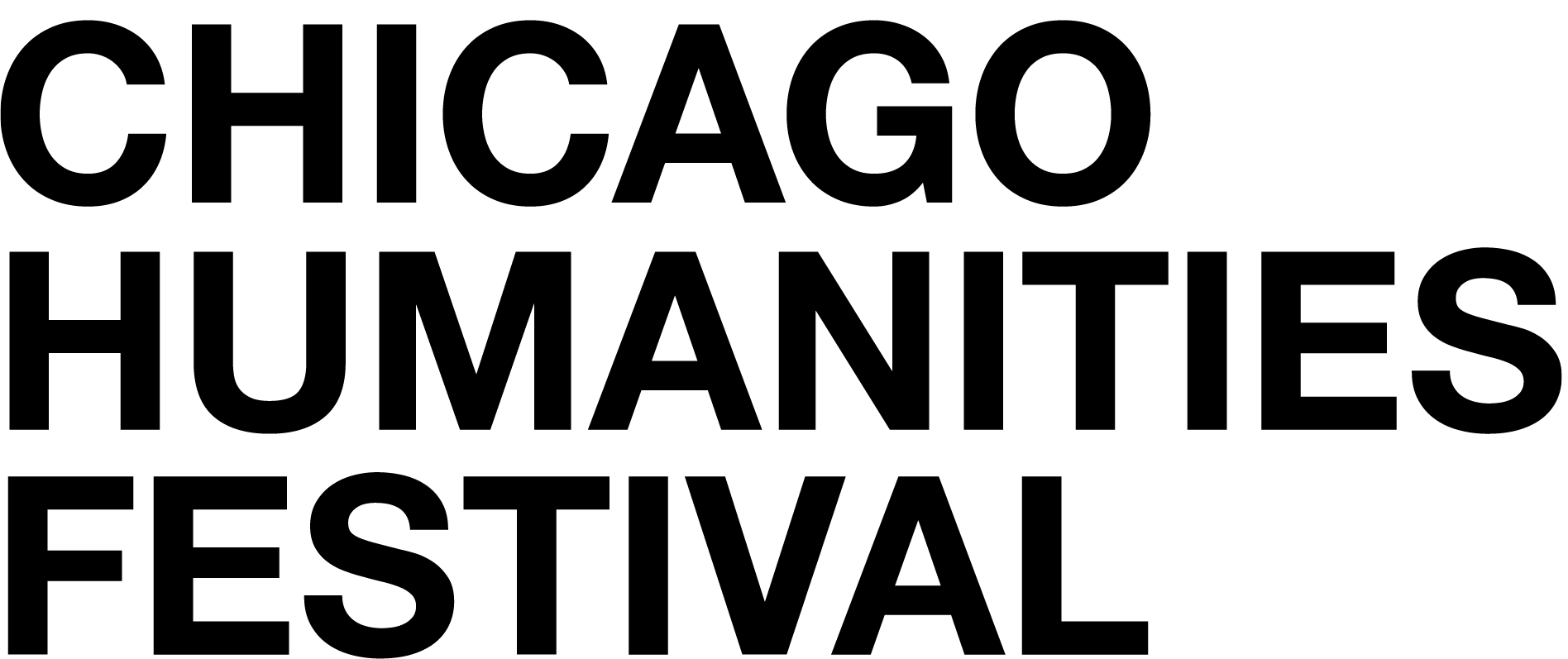
- Formation: 1989
- Headquarters: Chicago, Illinois, United States
- Website: https://www.chicagohumanities.org/

The Chicago Humanities Festival is a non-profit organization which hosts an annual series of lectures, concerts, and films in Chicago, Illinois, United States. There are two seasons each year, including a spring festival from April through May, and a longer fall festival from September through November. The festival was started in 1989 by the Illinois Humanities Council and became an independent organization in 1997. Each year of programming is connected to a broader theme and covers a wide variety of topics in the arts, politics and society, and science and technology.

== Mission ==
The Chicago Humanities Festival is designed to create opportunities for people to explore the humanities.

== History ==
Under the aegis of the Illinois Humanities Council and its then-chairman Richard J. Franke, the notion of a "humanities day" was proposed, and then expanded into a "festival". Eileen Mackevich created the first Chicago Humanities Festival, a one-day affair, held on November 11, 1990, at the Art Institute of Chicago and Orchestra Hall, before an audience of 3,500 people. Eight programs addressed the theme Expressions of Freedom, including a keynote address by playwright Arthur Miller. Founding co-sponsor institutions included the Art Institute of Chicago, the Chicago Symphony Orchestra, Lyric Opera of Chicago, and the University of Chicago.

In 1997, the Festival formally separated from the Illinois Humanities Council and established itself as an independent, nonprofit organization. Under Eileen Mackevich's leadership, by 2006, the independent Festival had expanded to nearly 150 programs over 16 days, in more than 30 venues, involving nearly 40 partner institutions and several hundred site volunteers, and attracting a combined audience of nearly 50,000.

A Children's Humanities Festival was introduced in 2000. In addition, a year-round slate of education programs is devoted to supporting classroom teachers and students. The Festival also expanded its presence year-round, offering public lectures, readings, concerts, and special events that anticipate and build interest in the November Festival.

In 2006, Lawrence Weschler was appointed as the first artistic director of CHF, and in 2007 Stuart Flack joined as executive director.

In January 2010, Matti Bunzl was appointed as associate artistic director. In the fall, after four years with the festival, Lawrence Weschler became emeritus artistic director and Matti Bunzl assumed the role of artistic director. Bunzl left in 2014 for Vienna's Wien Museum.

Alison Cuddy was the artistic director from 2017 to 2021. In 2022, Lauren M. Pacheco and Michael Green were hired as Co-Creative Directors.

== Stages, Sights & Sounds ==
In 2009, the Children's Humanities Festival was renamed to Stages, Sights & Sounds to better reflect the full breadth of the spring festival. Stages, Sights & Sounds is now in its third year. The spring festival's emphasis on performance provides contrast to the fall festival's adult-centered programming, which includes more lectures and discussions in exploration of a central theme that changes each year.

== Past festivals ==
CHF I: Expressions of Freedom (1990)
Notable Presenters: Arthur Miller, Ed Paschke, Philip Gossett

CHF II: Culture Contact (1991)
Notable Presenters: Toni Morrison, John Edgar Wideman, Michael Ondaatje, Sandra Cisneros

CHF III: From Freedom to Equality (1992)
Notable Presenters: John Updike, Czesław Miłosz

CHF IV: From Communication to Understanding (1993)
Notable Presenters: William Safire, David McCullough, Marlo Thomas

CHF V: Crime and Punishment (1994)
Notable Presenters: Tom Wolfe, Scott Turow, Sherman Alexie

CHF VI: Love and Marriage (1995)
Notable Presenters: Stephen Sondheim, Stevie Wonder, Diane Ackerman, Betty Friedan

CHF VII: Birth and Death (1996)
Notable Presenters: Edward Albee, Jane Urquhart, Stephen Ambrose

CHF VIII: Work & Play (1997)
Notable Presenters: Peter O'Toole, Amartya Sen, Michael Moore

CHF IX: He/She (1998)
Notable Presenters: Wendy Wasserstein, Edward Hirsch, Galway Kinnell

CHF X: New & Old (1999)
Notable Presenters: Yusef Komunyakaa, Mordecai Richler

CHF XI: NOW! (2000)
Notable Presenters: Alan Lightman, Harold Ramis, Alison Lurie

CHF XII: Words & Pictures (2001)
Notable Presenters: Leonard Nimoy, Jonathan Franzen, Witold Rybczynski, Junot Díaz, Art Spiegelman

CHF XIII: Brains & Beauty (2002)
Notable Presenters: Francis Fukuyama, Joyce Carol Oates, Jeffrey Eugenides, Francine Prose, Mira Nair

CHF XIV: Saving + Spending (2003)
Notable Presenters: Roberto Benigni, Oscar Hijuelos, Tom Wolfe

CHF XV: Time (2004)
Notable Presenters: August Wilson, Maxine Hong Kingston, Clive Barker

CHF XVI: Home and Away (2005)
Notable Presenters: Margaret Atwood, Salman Rushdie, Annie Proulx, Susan Orlean

CHF XVII: Peace and War (2006)
Notable Presenters: Paul Krugman, Azar Nafisi, Joel Meyerowitz, Frank McCourt, Joan Baez, Errol Morris, Wesley Clark, Garry Trudeau

CHF XVIII: The Climate of Concern (2007)
Notable presenters: Wangari Maathai, E.L. Doctorow, Philip Pullman, Majora Carter, Peter Singer, Roger Payne, Terry Tempest Williams, W.S. Merwin, Edward Burtynsky, Maya Lin, Dave Eggers, Colin Quinn, Cat Chow, Greil Marcus, Amartya Sen, and the head writers of The Onion

CHF XIX: Thinking Big! (2008)
Notable presenters: David McCullough, Jeffrey Sachs, Robert Darnton, Wendy Kopp, Erika Doss, Robert Irwin, Naomi Klein, Lawrence Lessig, Amitav Ghosh, Colonel Eileen Collins, Jonathan Alter, Ronald Mallett, and Laurence Tribe

CHF XX: Laughter (2009)
Notable presenters: Matt Groening, John Hodgman, Bob Sabiston, Lynda Barry, Jules Feiffer, Robert Mankoff, Barbara Ehrenreich, Paul Farmer, Claire McCaskill, Robert Reich, Billy Collins, Ronald K.L. Collins, Kay Ryan, Tim Reid, Tom Dreesen, Ian Frazier, John Adams (composer)

CHFXXI: The Body (2010)
Notable presenters: Kareem Abdul-Jabbar, Sam Shepard, Dan Savage, Sarah Jones (stage actress), Sherwin B. Nuland, Laura Kipnis, Frank Shorter, Alpana Singh

CHF XXII: tech•knowledgē (2011)
Notable presenters: Stephen Sondheim, Jonathan Franzen, Jeanne Gang, William Gibson, Michael Taussig, Cathy Davidson, Yuri Lane, Claudia Rankine, Jared Diamond

CHF XXIII: America (2012)
Notable presenters: Camille Paglia, Mark Helprin, Charles C. Mann, John Lewis Gaddis, Yves Béhar, Austan Goolsbee, Neil MacGregor, Nate Silver, Ian Frazier, Russ Feingold, David Brooks, Elie Wiesel, Richard Ford

CHF: Animal - What Makes Us Human (2013)
Notable presenters: David Axelrod, Rick Bayless, Jonathan Safran Foer, Kimberly Peirce, Martina Navratilova, Sherman Alexie

CHF: Journeys (2014)
Notable presenters: Anne Rice, Andrew Ross Sorkin, Cheryl Strayed, eighth blackbird

CHF: Citizens (2015)
Notable presenters: Ta-Nehisi Coates, Elvis Costello, Lawrence Lessig, Bob Mankoff

CHF: Speed (2016)
Notable presenters: Gloria Steinem, Trevor Noah, Thomas Friedman

CHF: Belief (2017)
Notable presenters: Al Gore, Reza Aslan, Samantha Power

CHF: Graphic (2018)

Notable presenters: Tom Hanks, Abbi Jacobson, Hanif Abdurraqib, Ron Chernow, Jill Lepore, Tim Wu, Phoebe Robinson, Doris Kearns Goodwin

CHF: Power (2019)

Notable presenters: Nikki Giovanni, Julia Louis-Dreyfus, Henry Louis Gates, Jr., David Brooks, Stacey Abrams, Raghuram Rajan

CHF: Vision (2020)

Notable presenters: Tori Amos, Abby McEnany, Margaret Atwood, David Axelrod, Maria Hinojosa, John Dickerson

CHF: Public (2022)
