= Cad (river) =

- Location within Romania

Location
- Country: Romania
- Counties: Harghita County

Physical characteristics
- Mouth: Olt
  - location: Downstream of Mădăraș
  - coordinates: 46.4742°N 25.7621°E
- Length: 13 km (8.1 mi)
- Basin size: 24 km^{2} (9.3 sq mi)

Basin features
- Progression: Olt→ Danube→ Black Sea

The Cad is a left tributary of the river Olt which flows through Romania. It merges into the Olt near Mădăraș. It is 13 km (8.1 mi) long and its river basin covers an area of 24 km^{2} (9.3 sq mi).
