= George Caddy =

Australian dancer and photographer

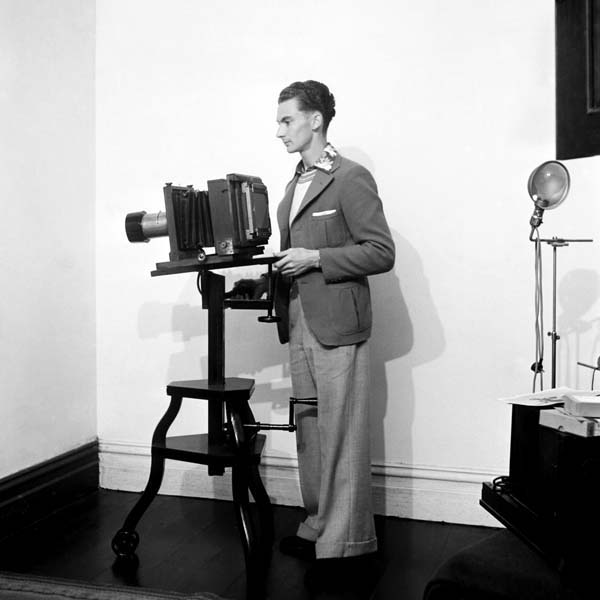
George Caddy, 1939

George Caddy (1914–1983) was an Australian dancer and photographer. Caddy emerged as a significant photographer of social activities on Bondi Beach in his day, only when hundreds of his photographs were re-discovered in 2007, among them the only existing documentation of an historic beach acrobatic club.

== Early life ==
Born in Melbourne, Victoria, Caddy moved with his family to Sydney in 1929 when he was 15. His father left the family when Caddy was 17 and the family was living in Bondi. The young Caddy found a job as a paper pattern cutter for the Australian Home Journal in 1936, taking up photography and competitive dancing in his spare time.

By the time he was 20 he had become a champion jitterbug dancer. Photographs in magazines from that period show him with Mavis Lang, the reigning Australian jitterbug champion at the time.

From 1936 until 1941 he spent most weekends down at the beach, photographing his friends who were members of a local gym and becoming known as a dancer with the nickname "The Bondi Jitterbug".

Both activities came to an end when he enlisted in the army.

== Photography ==
At 15 Caddy was entering the monthly Australian Photographic Review's photographic competitions and winning. In the senior division Max Dupain of Ashfield was 19 and coming third. Caddy's "sunbather" was taken in the same year as Dupain's iconic image with the difference that the image is a closeup of someone's feet standing on the subject's back.

A self-taught amateur, Caddy was well-known within camera club circles and like Dupain, his work was influenced heavily by the modernist style of the New York-based Popular Photography Magazine.

=== Equipment ===
A 1939 photograph shows Caddy posing with the camera he used, a Voigtländer Bergheil plate camera with a wire frame viewfinder, flashlight attachment and roll-film back, producing 6x6 centimetre negatives.

== Discovery ==
Following his death Caddy's photographs were lost for 24 more years when his son Paul took the cardboard box of 290 negatives back to Tasmania and forgot about them. On refinding the box, his son contacted photographer Jon Lewis who informed the State Library of New South Wales. The plates turned out to be a rare collection of high-grade work with a unique subject and the photographer, a contemporary of iconic Australian photographer, Max Dupain. Within a year an exhibition (November 2008 - February 2009) at the Library was organised by the curator of photography, Alan Davies.

Davies says that Caddy's photographs provide a unique body of work. Caddy was a people-oriented person which shows in his photographs compared with his contemporary, Dupain whose work focuses on the aesthetics of the scene.

=== Beachobatics ===
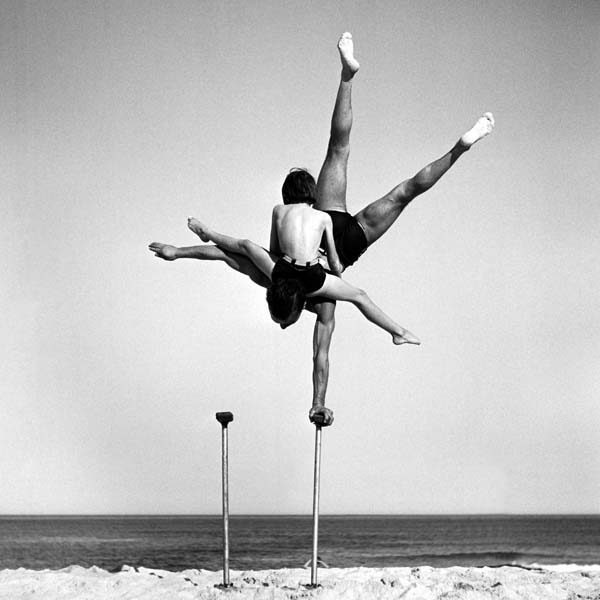
Beachobatics

Apart from documenting fashions and scenes, many of the photographs show the way people entertained themselves on Bondi Beach in the 1930s. The photographs cover the period from 1936 to 1941 and are the only known record of the Waverley Men's Gymnastic Club (formed 1921) when they took their "beachobatics" to Bondi where the group of both men and women constructed ground pyramids of up to 10 people.

Beachobatics died out after the Second World War and the Caddy photographs remain the chief resource for documents of the activities. The only surviving member of the club is Charlie Lusty.

== Exhibition 2009 ==
A presentation of photographs entitled Bondi Jitterbug: George Caddy And His Camera opened in January 2009, at the State Library of NSW.

== Later years and death ==
In the army, Caddy was stationed near Brisbane as a gunner in an anti-aircraft battery. He married Betty York in 1943 and his son Paul was born the following year. When he returned to civilian life in 1946, he packed away the negatives and did not resume his photographic or dancing activities.

Caddy died in Maroubra in 1983.

== See also ==
- Max Dupain
- Jitterbug
