= P. L. Cady =

American politician (1883–1959)

Member of the Nebraska Legislature from the 11th district
- In office January 5, 1937 – January 3, 1939
- Preceded by: Position created
- Succeeded by: Richard N. Johnson

Member of the Nebraska State Senate from the 8th district
- In office January 1, 1935 – January 5, 1937
- Preceded by: Hugo Srb
- Succeeded by: Position abolished

Personal details
- Born: August 1, 1883 Bellwood, Nebraska
- Died: September 18, 1959 (aged 76) Fremont, Nebraska
- Party: Democratic
- Spouse: Margaret Larson (m. 1910)
- Children: 3
- Education: Fremont Normal School; Kansas City Veterinary College
- Occupation: Veterinarian

Pearl Leroy Cady (August 1, 1883 – September 18, 1959) was a Democratic politician from Nebraska who served in the Nebraska State Senate from 1935 to 1937 and as a member of the Nebraska Legislature from the 11th district from 1937 to 1939.

Cady was born in Bellwood, Nebraska, in 1883, and graduated from Columbus High School. He later attended Fremont Normal School and graduated from the Kansas City Veterinary College. Cady practiced veterinary medicine in Arlington, Nebraska, and served as the village's mayor.

In 1934, when State Senator Hugo Srb ran for the U.S. House from the 3rd district, Cady ran to succeed him in the 8th district. He won the Democratic nomination and defeated Republican Robert McWhorter in the general election with 65 percent of the vote.

When the bicameral legislature was abolished and replaced with a unicameral legislature in 1936, Cady ran in the newly created 11th district. He defeated Thomas Fowler in the general election with 54 percent of the vote. Cady declined to seek re-election in 1938.

Cody died on September 18, 1959.
