= Combined Annotation Dependent Depletion =

Combined Annotation Dependent Depletion (CADD) is a tool that evaluates the deleteriousness of single nucleotide, insertion and deletion variants in the human genome. In contrast with other annotation tools that are restricted in scope, the CADD framework integrates multiple annotations into one metric. This is done by contrasting variants that survived natural selection with simulated mutations.
