= CADS =

CADS may stand for:

- Canadian Adaptive Snowsports, an organization based in Canada
- Canadian Association for Disabled Skiing, an organization assisting individuals with a disability to participate in recreational and competitive snow skiing and snowboarding
- Center for Advanced Defense Studies, a Washington D.C.–based non-governmental national security research group
- Corpus-assisted discourse studies, the study, investigation, and comparison of features of particular discourse types
- Christ's Amateur Dramatic Society, a student society of Christ's College, Cambridge
