= Justice Cady =

Justice Cady may refer to:

- Daniel Cady (1773–1859), ex officio judge of the New York Court of Appeals
- Mark Cady (1953–2019), chief justice of the Iowa Supreme Court
