= Chauncey G. Cady =

American politician (1803–1893)

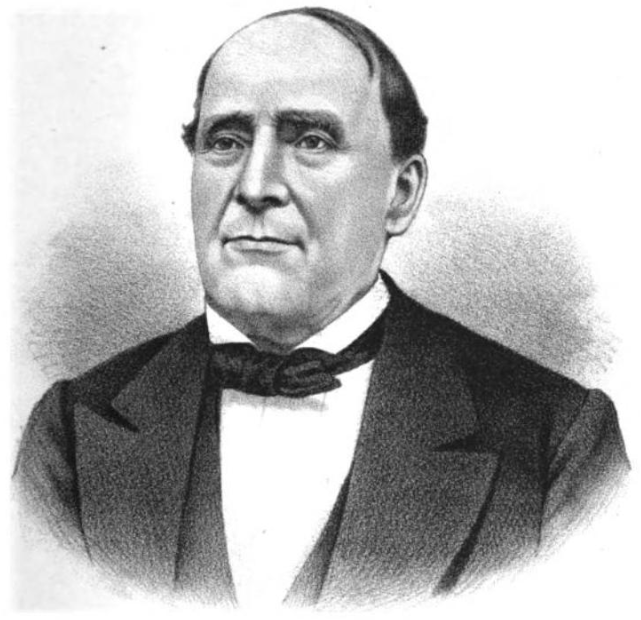
Chauncey G. Cady

Chauncey Goodrich Cady (August 20, 1803 – December 10, 1893) was an American farmer and politician.

Born in Otsego County, New York, Cady moved to Mt. Clemens, Michigan Territory and settled in what is now Cady, Michigan. He was a farmer and held various local offices. He served in the Michigan Territorial Militia in 1826-1829 as a paymaster with the rank of major. In 1845 and 1849, he served in the Michigan House of Representatives. He joined the Republican Party in 1854. He died in Detroit, Michigan. His brother was Horace H. Cady who also served in the Michigan Legislature.
