= Alison Cuddy =

Chicago-based cultural producer and former public-radio host

Alison Cuddy is a former host of Chicago Public Radio’s (WBEZ 91.5 FM) "Eight Forty-Eight" weekday news magazine show. She served as the artistic director for the Chicago Humanities Festival.

== Life and career ==
On Chicago Public Radio (WBEZ 91.5 FM), Cuddy became solo host of "Eight Forty-Eight" on August 1, 2010, and was replaced by Tony Sarabia in January 2012. She has been named among “the most powerful women in Chicago journalism” by local media journalist Robert Feder of Timeout Chicago magazine. Before becoming solo host for "Eight Forty-Eight", Cuddy was co-host with Richard Steele for two years.

Jason Marck directs "Eight Forty-Eight". Cuddy secured her first radio position in 2001 as assistant producer of "Odyssey", also a Chicago Public Radio program. She eventually produced "Odyssey" and "Chicago Matters", another WBEZ production.

Before radio, Cuddy worked in the immigration department for an IT firm (ThoughtWorks, Inc.) in Chicago. Cuddy also taught at DePaul University in Chicago and the University of Pittsburgh in Pittsburgh.

Since 2017, Cuddy was the artistic director of the Chicago Humanities Festival. She no longer works at the festival as of December 2021.

== Personal life ==
Her age is undisclosed. She stated “I’m sensitive about revealing everything to the audience...I want the way people relate to me to be on the basis of the job, which is not necessarily about who I am.”

== Education ==
Cuddy holds a B.F.A. in cinema studies from Concordia University in Montreal, Quebec, Canada. She has also earned an M.A. in English from the University of Pittsburgh.

== Residence ==
Cuddy hails from Winnipeg, Manitoba, Canada. She is a current resident of Chicago, Illinois, living in the Lake View neighborhood.

== Criticism ==
Criticism of her vocal quality started when she became the solo host of "Eight Forty-Eight".
