= Horace H. Cady =

American politician (1801–1887)

Member of the Michigan House of Representatives
- In office 1843, 1865, 1873–1874

Personal details
- Born: Horace Harvey Cady; February 21, 1801
- Died: October 29, 1887 (aged 86) Mount Clemens, Michigan, U.S.
- Relatives: Chauncey G. Cady (brother)
- Profession: Politician, farmer

Horace Harvey Cady (February 21, 1801 – October 29, 1887) was an American politician and farmer.

Cady settled in Mt. Clemens, Michigan Territory in 1821. There he settled on his farm. He served in local offices in Macomb County, Michigan. He served in the Michigan House of Representatives in 1843, 1865, and 1873–1874. He died in Mt. Clemens, Michigan. His brother, Chauncey G. Cady, also served in the Michigan House of Representatives.
