= Candace (given name) =

Candace is a royal title from the Bible, ultimately deriving from the term kandake, a title for a queen or queen mother in the ancient African Kingdom of Kush. In the United States, it was a popular name during the late 1970s, throughout the 1980s, and into the early 1990s.

== People with the given name ==
- Candace Allen (author) (born 1950), a Hollywood screenwriter
- Candace Allen (beauty queen) (21st century), Miss District of Columbia USA 2006
- Candace Bailey (born 1982), an American actress
- Candace Bouchard, American politician
- Candace Cameron Bure (born 1976), an American actress
- Candace Bushnell (born 1958), an American writer
- Candace Camp (born 1949), a best-selling American writer
- Candace Charles (born 1990), Miss Guyana 2007
- Candace Collins (born 1957), an American model and actress
- Candace Gingrich (born 1966), an LGBT rights activist
- Candace Glendenning (born 1953), an English actress
- Candace Glickman (21st century), Miss New Hampshire 2003
- Candace Hilligoss (born 1935), an American actress
- Candace Introcaso, the President of La Roche College
- Candace Jones (born 1955), a Canadian figure skater
- Candace Kita (21st century), an American actress
- Candace Kroslak (born 1978), an American actress
- Candace Newmaker (1989–2000), a victim of child abuse
- Candace O'Connor (born 1950), a freelance writer and editor
- Candace Otto (21st century), a Miss Pennsylvania 2003
- Candace Oviatt, American ecologist
- Candace Owens (born 1989), American commentator and political activist
- Candace Parker (born 1986), an American collegiate basketball player
- Candace Pert (1946–2013), an American neuroscientist
- Candace Robb (born 1950), an English historical novelist
- Candace Savage (born 1949), a Canadian writer
- Candace Lynn Starr (born 1975), American murder victim
- Candace Talmadge (21st century), a liberal newspaper columnist
- Candace Vogler (21st century), an American philosopher
- Candace Wheeler (1827–1923), one of America's first woman interior and textile designers
- H. Candace Gorman (21st century), an American attorney

== Fictional characters with the given name ==
- Candace Barkham, a fictional recurring character in the Australian soap opera Neighbours
- Candace "Caddy" Compson, a fictional character from The Sound and the Fury by William Faulkner
- Candace Flynn, Phineas' older sister and Ferb's stepsister from Phineas and Ferb.
- Candace Southern, a Marvel Comics supporting character
- Candace, a character in 2020 video game Genshin Impact

== See also ==
- Candace, other uses of the word.
- Candice, a rarer variant spelling
