= Candice Mwakalyelye =

TV and radio broadcaster

Candace Mwakalyelye
- Born: 8 August 1986
- Occupation: Media Practitioner

Candace Mwakalyelye is a TV and radio broadcaster and media practitioner.

== Early life ==
Mwakalyelye was born on 8 August 1986. Not much is known about her birthplace and parentage although other sources say she is half Tanzanian and half Zimbabwean.

== Career ==
Mwakalyelye, whose nickname is NdiCandice or Malkia, the Lion Queen, is a TV and radio broadcaster, media practitioner, MC and brand ambassador who is currently based in Zimbabwe. She has worked in Tanzania for broadcasting stations there as well as in the private sector.

She worked for ZiFM from 2012, a radio station in Zimbabwe and left in 2016 before returning in 2018. She is a winner of various awards including the Megafest National Business Awards - Media and Business Information Personality of the Year (2013), Zimbabwe International Women Awards- Media Professional of the Year (2015).

As an MC, she has hosted the prestigious Zimbabwe Achievers Awards which were held in London.
