= Central Ammunition Depot =

Central Ammunition Depot may refer to:

== India ==
- CAD, Pulgaon, Wardha district, Maharashtra

== United Kingdom ==
- CAD Bramley Camp, Hampshire
- CAD Kineton, Warwickshire
- CAD Longtown, Cumbria
- CAD Monkton Farleigh, Wiltshire, also known as CAD Corsham
- CAD Nesscliffe, Shropshire
