= Lina Stergiou =

Lina Stergiou is a Greek architect, researcher, writer and educator, who examines spatial politics and facets of avant-garde studies in multiple formats - exhibitions, design and writing.

== Early life and education ==
Lina Stergiou was born in Athens. Being from an early age absorbed in sketching and painting, experimenting with cardboard cards, and playing with friends Hide and Seek in small wooden structures they created with crates of fruits, at the age of eight she decided to become an architect, while gradually developing to an avid reader of books in the arts and humanities.

Stergiou received a Doctor of Philosophy in Cultural, Critical and Historical Studies from Kingston School of Art, a Post-professional Master's degree in Architecture and Urban Design from Pratt Institute School of Architecture, New York, and a Professional degree - Master of Science and Bachelor of Science - in Architecture from the School of Architecture, National Technical University of Athens. Based in Athens, has lived and worked in New York City, London, and Suzhou and Shanghai while an Associate Professor at Xi’an Jiaotong-Liverpool University until 2018, and until 2020 Honorary Associate Professor at the University of Liverpool.

== Career and research ==
Lina Stergiou is a scholar in critical, historical and avant-garde studies, theory, history, criticism of Architecture, and an active spatial research and design practitioner. Having started writing articles for periodicals, teaching design from the age of 25 and lecturing theory in Schools of Architecture of a dozen Universities in South and North America, South-East Asia, and Europe including four years at the University of Thessaly, in the academic year 2004-5, she has been a Princeton University Seeger Research Fellow for developing the research Athens: A Case of Symptomatic Ugliness. It was slightly modified and presented at the Conference of the Cultural Foundation of the Journalists’ Union of Daily Newspapers of Athens, and published in 2011. A reviewing expert in humanities for the Swiss National Science Foundation/SNSF in 2020, and in history, theory and criticism for the Association of Collegiate Schools of Architecture/ACSA in 2019-2020, and having presented and published 36 papers, her main scholarly work is Institution Architecture: Building the Avant-Garde. A Sociological Approach (2025).

Stergiou developed her research into the activist project of social ecology AAO: Ethics/Aesthetics, a two-year series of activities that included conferences, academic workshops, exhibitions, collective experiments and public actions that took place in Athens in 2011 and 2012. In collaboration with Benaki Museum, Hellenic Cosmos, Paris 8 University, Athens School of Fine Arts, National Technical University of Athens, Parsons School of Design and 45 participants - international artists, designers, architects, scholars, academics and activists (such as Rebar art and design studio, Futurefarmers, Public Architecture, Worldbike/Xtracycle, Cameron Sinclair, Laurie Lazer & Darryl Smith, Recetas Urbanas, Sarah Wigglesworth, Ole Bouman, Teddy Cruz among others) - it addressed the state of crisis in Greece, a social one affecting underrepresented and unprivileged population groups, an environmental one, but also the value system, and explored the potentialities that spatial design opens for the cityscape, the social fabric and the environment. For Lena Hourmouzi, the four sections of the large central exhibition Ethics/Aesthetics more or less summarized the entire activity of the project: Society and Aesthetics, Ethics of the Profession, Activism, and Action and Reaction. These were also the themes of the contemporary social problems that the project investigated through the prism of Architecture, as a broader spatial practice, of Art and Design. For Haido Skandila, it was requesting social change through Architecture, Art and Design, for Marios Kehagias it was "social architecture arriving in Athens", and for writer and literary critic Ilias Maglinis it meant “let's leave theory behind and let's start acting,” a call for interdisciplinary collective actions.

Its international academic workshops projected in open public spaces in downtown Athens aimed at creating places of social integration and of rediscovery of the nineteenth century city trace (pilot actions Athens Here and Now. They produced Social Collider in collaboration with transactional aesthetics H2H artist theoretician Maurice Benayoun and Art and Activism academic programs with artist Vicky Betsou, that have been part of Athens Art Week of the Hellenic Ministry of Culture, of Futur en Seine - Futur.e.s Paris, and of Athens Digital Arts Festival in Technopolis. AAO project series also included the social ecology installation environment Ecosmosis developed with Benayoun at the Hellenic Cosmos, an interactive aesthetic and socio-spatial environment. For Stergiou, the political ramification of this cultural activism can be approached as "Praxis: The Everyday Not as Usual." The AAO project is recorded to have been commented by articles in daily and Sunday newspapers, architectural magazines and magazines on culture, and interviews in radio stations.

Forwarding its catalogue AAO: Ethics/Aesthetics (Athens: Benaki Museum and Papasotiriou, 2011), the Minister of Culture and Tourism Pavlos Geroulanos noted that it "places architecture and design at the core of public debate", while the General Secretary of Regional Planning and Urban Development, of the Ministry of the Environment and Energy (Greece), Maria Kaltsa, wrote that it "reflects valid contemporary concerns... we are facing a period of great recession, which expresses itself as economic but is indeed a 'value system' crisis on all levels". For the Dean of the National Technical University of Athens, School of Architecture, Spyros Raftopoulos, it "is a well-timed effort to enhance sensitivity and concern, expressed though a range of activities...it has succeeded in creating a platform of dialogue...and, finally, to raise awareness among the general public...for the evolution of our urban environment", and for the Rector of the Athens School of Fine Arts, George Harvalias, "AAO project is pursuing its goals with the highest degree of competence and organization...an active creative 'plant' of sensitization, research and processing of proposals...indicating that any solutions cannot be unconnected to the unseen directions and dynamics of socio-political developments".

== Books ==
- Lina Stergiou, Institution Architecture: Building the Avant-Garde. A Sociological Approach (London: Routledge, 2025), 338 pages, 4 B/W illustrations, 9 tables. ISBN 9781032191270
- Lina Stergiou, ed., AAO Project: Ethics/Aesthetics (Athens: Benaki Museum and Papasotiriou, 2011), English/Greek, 432 pages. ISBN 9789604910267
- Lina Stergiou, ed., Revelation (Athens: Cultural Olympiad 2001–2004, 2003), English, 520 pages. ISBN 9607980492
