= LGBTQ rights in Greece =

- Location of Greece (dark green) – in Europe (light green & dark grey) – in the European Union (light green) – [Legend]
- Legal status: Male homosexuality legal since 1951 (female homosexuality always legal), equal age of consent since 2015
- Gender identity: Yes, since 2010 (sterilisation and sex reassignment surgery not required since 2017)
- Military: Yes, LGBT individuals may serve openly
- Discrimination protections: All anti-LGBT discrimination explicitly banned. Hate crimes laws covering sexual orientation, gender identity and sex characteristics (see below)

Family rights
- Recognition of relationships: Cohabitation agreement since 2015; Same-sex marriage since 2024
- Adoption: Full adoption rights since 2024

Lesbian, gay, bisexual, transgender, and queer (LGBTQ) rights in Greece are among the most advanced in Europe, with the country consistently placing in top positions on LGBT rights classifications. Public opinion on homosexuality in Greece is generally regarded as culturally liberal, with civil partnerships being legally recognised since 2015 and same-sex marriage since 16 February 2024.

Both male and female types of same-sex sexual activity have been legal in Greece since 1951, and anti-discrimination laws in employment were enacted in 2005. Since then, anti-discrimination laws have been extended to other spheres, including gender identity. Hate speech and hate crime legislation is one of the most rigid and comprehensive in Europe. In 2015, civil unions (Greek: σύμφωνο συμβίωσης; cohabitation agreements) were legalised for same-sex couples, making households headed by same-sex couples eligible for many of the legal protections and rights available to married opposite-sex couples. In 2017, transgender people were granted the right to have their gender identity recognized and to change their legal sex without having to undergo surgical alteration of their genitals in order to have key identity documents changed. In February 2018, a county court in Greece granted a non-binary person the right to a gender-neutral name. In May 2018, the Greek Parliament passed a law granting same-sex couples the right to foster care children. In February 2024, the Parliament made marriage and full adoption rights available to same-sex couples.

Gay culture is vibrant in the capital of Athens, particularly in the gay neighbourhood of Gazi, in Thessaloniki and some of the Greek islands. With Greece being one of Europe's most popular LGBT tourist destinations, many establishments catering for the LGBT community can be found in islands such as Mykonos, which is known worldwide for the gay and lesbian scene. There are four LGBT pride parades held annually, in Athens, Thessaloniki, Patras and Heraklion, the capital of the island of Crete. The largest of them, the Athens Pride, saw record participation in 2015, and the attendance of many public figures including the President of the Hellenic Parliament and the Mayor of Athens.

According to recent reports carried out by ILGA-Europe, which assesses LGBT rights in European countries, Greece achieved one of the highest improvements in the legal and policy situation of LGBT people in the last decade, with an overall score of 70%, while in 2025 Greece ranked 7th in Europe out of 49 countries in LGBT rights. In April 2025, Greece announced a new policy and introduced a bill to ban surrogacy contracts for gay men and single men. In May 2025, Greece's Supreme Court upheld same-sex marriage. The official publication of the ruling was published in March 2026.

== Legality of same-sex sexual activity ==
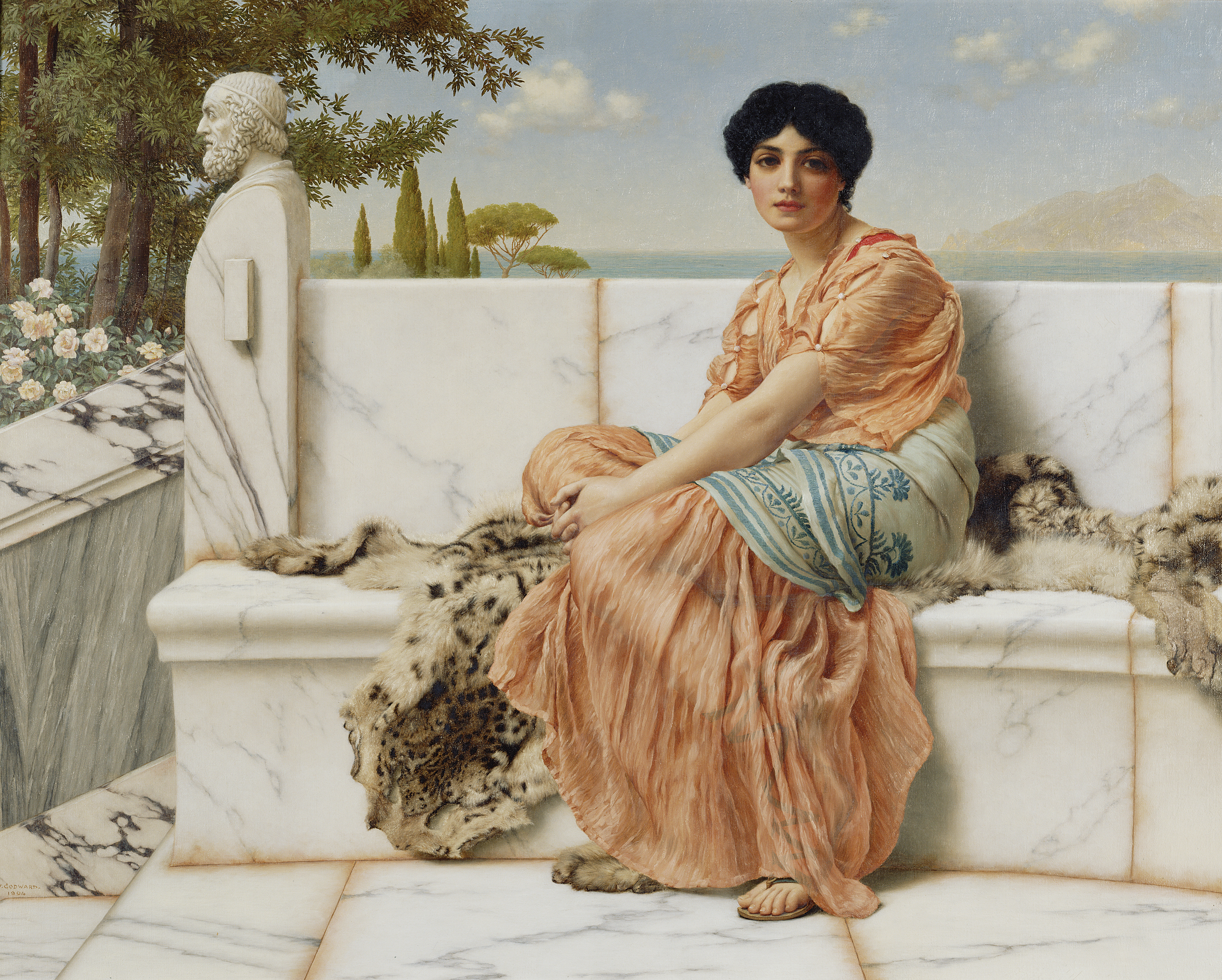
The word "lesbian" is derived from the name of the island of Lesbos, from which Greek poet Sappho (Aeolic Greek: Σαπφώ) hailed, whose namesake also derived another word: "sapphic". Sappho is here portrayed by John William Godward.

Following the country's independence from the Ottoman Empire, the penal code of 1834 stipulated that anyone guilty of sodomy shall be punished with at least one year imprisonment and police surveillance.

Male homosexual practice was decriminalized in 1951. Lesbians were not mentioned or acknowledged in the Greek Criminal Code. The Penal Code outlawed male prostitution and provided for a higher age of consent of 17 for male homosexual acts. However, this provision was abolished resulting in equalization of the age of consent and the legalization of male prostitution, subject to existing laws on the regulation of prostitution.

The age of consent in Greece is 15, In 2015, along with the legalization of same-sex civil unions, Article 347, which provided a further prohibition of seducing a male under 17 if the actor is a male adult, was repealed, therefore equalising the age of consent for homosexual acts.

== Recognition of same-sex relationships ==
The Greek Constitution provides no definition of marriage. However, it does stipulate that, like motherhood and childhood, it must be under the protection of the State. In June 2025, the Greek Council of State upheld the February 2024 legislation on both marriage and adoption for same-sex couples by a majority vote of 21-6.

The former New Democracy-led Government of Prime Minister Kostas Karamanlis was opposed to same-sex marriage. While it had introduced legislation that offered several rights to unmarried couples, this explicitly excluded same-sex couples.

The National Human Rights Committee proposed a registry that would cover both same-sex couples and unmarried opposite-sex ones and the Greek group OLKE announced its intention to sue Greek municipalities that refused to marry same-sex couples.

The Greek Government under George Papandreou, leader of Panhellenic Socialist Movement (PASOK), was preparing legislation for same-sex registered partnerships, which, however, never took place, as LGBT groups believed that they were going to be insufficient.

In November 2013, the European Court of Human Rights ruled in favour of the plaintiffs in the case Valianatos and Others vs. Greece and condemned the exclusion of same-sex couples from the option to contract cohabitation agreements, a non-marital relationship registration scheme established in 2008 for opposite-sex couples. The restriction of cohabitation agreements solely to opposite-sex couples was thus deemed non-convincing and the state was obliged to give a 5,000 euro compensation to each one of the plaintiffs.

Although there was no official recognition of same-sex couples at that time, a 1982 law that legalized civil marriage between "persons", without specifying gender, acted as a test-case for same-sex marriage. On 3 June 2008, the Mayor of Tilos, Anastasios Aliferis, married two same-sex couples, two lesbians and two gay men, citing the legal loophole. He was heavily criticized by clergymen of the Church of Greece, which in the past had also opposed the introduction of civil marriage. Justice Minister Sotirios Hatzigakis declared the Tilos marriages "invalid" and Supreme Court prosecutor Georgios Sanidas warned Mayor Aliferis of the legal repercussions of his "breach of duty", but he said he had "no intention of annulling the marriages". In May 2009, the marriage was officially annulled by the authorities.

Ιn December 2015, the Greek Parliament reintroduced a law draft that would expand cohabitation agreements to same-sex couples Many members of the Greek Church condemned the proposition. Most notably, Archbishop Ieronymos called homosexuality "a diversion from life", metropolitan Anthimos declared that "Not even animals have such dispositions", metropolitan Seraphim said "Pawns of the international Zionism! The masculofeminine is being created!" whereas metropolitan Amvrosios stated "Spit on them! They're disgraceful! They're nature's abominations!" The latter, paired with Amvrosios' initiative to have the bells of the churches in his metropolis ring mournfully, stirred up much controversy, the result of which was a kiss-in protest by two LGBT activists dressed up in clergy clothes in front of the building of the Athens metropolis.

Finally, on 23 December, the draft concerning the enriched and improved cohabitation agreement legislation was passed (193 to 56) with a significant absence of 51 MPs, making Greece the 26th European country to adopt same-sex recognition laws. The largest groups to oppose the cohabitation agreement bill were the Communist Party of Greece, Golden Dawn and the Greek Orthodox Church. Simultaneously, the anachronistic article 347, criminalizing acts of "unnatural lewdness" between men was abolished, equalizing the age of consent for sex between men (now standing at 15 years of age both for heterosexual and homosexual sexual intercourse). Furthermore, Greece's Prime Minister Alexis Tsipras, while debating the law in Greek Parliament, issued an apology to the LGBT community for the years of discrimination they had faced.

In December 2016, the Greek Parliament passed a bill expanding the rights of same-sex couples and ensuring equal protection in workplaces regardless of gender, religion or sexual orientation.

=== Same-sex marriage ===
Same-sex marriage has been legal in Greece since 15 February 2024.

In 2018, the European Court of Justice ruled that married same-sex couples have the same residency rights as married opposite-sex couples under EU law, even if same-sex marriage is not legal in that particular EU member state. The ruling affects all EU countries, which are obliged to abide by it, including Greece.

On 17 June 2022, SYRIZA and its leader, the former Greek Prime Minister Alexis Tsipras, submitted a historic draft bill promoting LGBT rights to the Greek Parliament. This draft bill legalises the same-sex marriages and the marriages may be both civil and religious, provided that the religion of the person permits it. It was rejected by the New Democracy majority.

In July 2023, the prime minister of Greece Kyriakos Mitsotakis, heading the recently re-elected New Democracy government, made an announcement to Greek media organisations that he "supports same-sex marriage and that Greek society is mature enough for same-sex marriage to be proposed by his government" and that "it will be implemented within this term of government".

On 15 February 2024, the New Democracy-led government proposed and passed a bill legalizing same-sex marriages with the backing of the opposition parties SYRIZA, PASOK, Course of Freedom and New Left despite opposition from the Greek Orthodox Church, thus, making Greece the first Orthodox Christian-majority country in the world to recognize same-sex marriages. Some of these opposition parties had proposed similar bills. Other non-parliamentary parties such as MeRA25 also supported the legalisation of same-sex marriages.

The first same-sex couples got married March 2024. The first overseas same-sex couple from Australia got married in Rhodes within the same month.

In May 2025, the Council of State ruled that civil marriage of same-sex couples and the right to adoption are in accordance with the Constitution, after rejecting relevant annulment applications.

== Child adoption and foster care ==
In April 2025, Greece announced a new policy and introduced a bill to ban surrogacy contracts for gay men and single men.

On 17 April 2018, a bill, titled the Child Adoption Law (Νόμος 4538/2018 - Μέτρα για την προώθηση των Θεσμών της Αναδοχής και Υιοθεσίας και άλλες διατάξεις), aimed at overhauling and simplifying the country's child adoption legislation, which has been criticized in the past as being overly bureaucratic and ineffective and for its extremely slow procedures, was submitted to the Greek Parliament. The bill, and specifically Article 8, also grants same-sex couples the right to foster children. In a debate at a parliamentary committee, the bill's Article 8 was supported by the vast majority of the country's agencies, organizations, and experts, with the exception of the conservative Orthodox Church of Greece, which voiced its opposition to it. The bill as a whole, including Article 8, was voted "on principle" by the committee on early May 2018, with the support of Syriza, the Independent Greeks and The River. New Democracy (ND), Democratic Alignment (DISI) and the Union of Centrists (EK) abstained, whereas Golden Dawn voted against it, It was due for final ratification by Parliament. MPs from every political party of the Greek political spectrum expressed their support for Article 8 of the law, which concerns foster care for same-sex couples, with ND and DISI softening their initial hardline position towards it and announcing that any of their MPs are free to support the bill once it arrives at the parliamentary session for final ratification.

Eventually, the bill, including its Article 8, was ratified by the Greek Parliament on 9 May 2018, with 161 MPs voting in support and 103 against, making Greece the newest EU country, after Portugal in 2016, to legalize foster care for same-sex couples and the first country in Southeastern Europe to do so.

The 17 June 2022 draft bill submitted to the Greek Parliament by SYRIZA and its leader, the former Greek Prime Minister Alexis Tsipras, grants recognition to both the Joint and stepchild adoption by same-sex couples, as well as the Altruistic surrogacy for all couples.

== Discrimination and hate speech ==
Since 2005, discrimination based on sexual orientation in the workplace has been prohibited.

While there has been considerable legal progress, conservative social mores still hold some influence and the Orthodox Church has often denounced homosexuality as a sin and "defect of human nature."

Greek law protects gender identity. According to Law 3896 of 2010 (Νόμος 3896/2010 - Εφαρμογή της αρχής των ίσων ευκαιριών και της ίσης μεταχείρισης ανδρών και γυναικών σε θέματα εργασίας και απασχόλησης), discrimination on the basis of gender identity is considered equal to discrimination on the basis of sex and thus all laws regarding the latter also cover the former.

In September 2014, the Law Against Racism and Xenophobia (Νόμος 4285/2014 - Καταπολέμηση ρατσισμού και ξενοφοβίας) was amended. The changes stipulated that hate speech and violence against LGBT individuals or groups would be punished with imprisonment for three months to three years and a fine of €5,000–20,000. If the actions have led to a crime, the penalty is increased by six months more imprisonment and an additional fine of 15,000 to 30,000 euros. If the final imprisonment exceeds one year, then the convict loses his/her political rights for one to five years. If the offender is a public worker, then they are punished with six months to three years imprisonment and a fine of 10,000 to 25,000 euros; if a crime is committed, they are punished with a fine of 25,000 to 50,000 euros. If the offender was committing the above representing an organisation or company, they are also fined. Entities in the public domain are, however, excluded from this last rule. This has led to criticism since the churches are also legal entities of the public domain, thereby excluding them from any consequences after the conviction of a priest of theirs. Furthermore, public prosecutors are given the freedom to move against the offenders even without a lawsuit from the victims, and if the victims file a lawsuit, they are allowed to do it free of charge, in contrast to the common practice.

Since 24 December 2015, Greece prohibits discrimination and hate crimes based on sex characteristics, which are among the strongest laws on the subject in Europe. On 2 December 2016, further anti-discrimination protections on the basis of sexual orientation, gender and religion in the workplace were passed by the Hellenic Parliament in a 201–21 vote with 5 abstaining and 73 absent. PinkNews described the law as one of the most rigid prohibitions of hate speech and hate crime in Europe.

== Gender identity and expression ==
From October 2017 to February 2024, to change one's legal gender in Greece, the legal requirements were a forced divorce (if married, due to the inability of performing same-sex marriage) and a court order.

In February 2024, the forced divorce requirement was lifted, as part of the bill legalising same-sex marriages that passed.

On 10 October 2017, the Greek Parliament passed, by a comfortable majority, the Legal Gender Recognition Law (Νόμος 4491/2017 - Νομική αναγνώριση της ταυτότητας φύλου), which grants transgender people in Greece the right to change their legal gender freely by abolishing any conditions and requirements, such as undergoing any medical interventions, sex reassignment surgeries or sterilisation procedures to have their gender legally recognized on their IDs. The bill grants this right to anyone aged 17 and older. However, even underaged children between the age of 15 and 17 have access to the legal gender recognition process, but under certain conditions, such as obtaining a certificate from a medical council. The bill was opposed by the Holy Synod of the Church of Greece, the Communist Party of Greece, Golden Dawn and New Democracy.

The Legal Gender Recognition Law followed a 20 July 2016 decision of the County Court of Athens, which ruled that a person who wants to change their legal gender is no longer obliged to already have undergone sex reassignment surgery. This decision was applied by the Court on a case-by-case basis.

In February 2018, the Marousi County Court ruled in favor of Jason-Antigone Dane's request to have their male birth name, Jason, changed on Registry Office files to a gender-neutral one by adding the female name Antigone next to it. However, while the court did rule in favor of the person's request for displaying a gender-neutral name on their ID, it decided against having their legal gender entry changed from male to third gender, citing the "lack of a relevant institutional framework for individuals not classified in a distinct case of a non-dual gender identity (third gender entry)" in Greece, although the 2017 Legal Gender Recognition Law does state that "the person [hence every person] has the right to the recognition of his or her gender identity as an element of his or her personality". The plaintiff's lawyer announced that they will appeal part of the ruling to a higher court (the part concerning the third gender marker on IDs).

In June 2018, a Greek court ruled that foreign transgender people, including refugees and immigrants, also have the right to the recognition of their gender identity, marking the first time that this right is extended beyond the definition of the 2017 Legal Gender Recognition Law, which restricted this right to Greek citizens only.

Since July 2022, Greece legally banned 'sex normalisation' surgery on intersex individuals under the age of 15 - unless a court order is approved or authorised.

== Conversion therapy ==
In May 2022, Greece legally banned conversion therapy on minors. This ban extends only to paid health professionals, thus exempting religious and other counsellors from the criminalization, a fact that has drawn criticism from Greek LGBTQ+ bodies such as Orlando LGBT+ and the Gay and Lesbian Community of Greece (OLKE). The bill has also been criticized for being too vague and brief in its definition of conversion practices, as well as overall, leading to doubts regarding its enforceability.

== Sex education in schools ==
On 23 December 2016, the Ministry of Education, Research and Religious Affairs announced that, starting from 2017, a thematic week would be taking place every second semester of the school year. The thematic week seeks to inform students and their parents about, among others, issues such as sex, sexual orientation, gender identity, homophobia and transphobia. The Ministry will also consider enhancement of the thematic week in the future. Although, none of the above has been reinforced, due to having faced multiple criticisms from the church and the public.

== Military service ==
Lesbian, gay, and bisexual individuals can serve openly in the Hellenic Armed Forces. However transgender individuals are not allowed to serve in the Armed Forces as being transgender is included in the conditions of medical ineligibility.

== Correctional Facilities ==
Since 4 December 2021, trans women detainees, upon their request, may be relocated to correctional facilities for women.

== Committee on drafting a national LGBTQI+ strategy ==
On 17 March 2021, by decision of the Prime Minister Kyriakos Mitsotakis, a committee was set up with the aim of drafting a National Strategy for the Equality of LGBTQI+ people in Greece. The Committee comes as a response to the European Commission's first ever strategy to protect the rights of LGBTIQ people in the European Union and its call to Member States to build on existing best practices and develop their own action plans on LGBTIQ equality on 12 November 2020. The Committee consists of academics, representatives of the civil society, representatives of the government and as a chairperson was appointed Linos-Alexandre Sicilianos, a former President of the European Court for Human Rights.

== Politics ==
In 1990, Paola Revenioti became the first Greek trans woman to run for political office, standing as a candidate for the Alternative Ecologists party. Later, she joined the left-wing MeRA25 party, led by Yanis Varoufakis. She stood as a candidate in the 2019 and 2023 Greek parliamentary elections, as well as in the 2024 European Parliament election.

Katerina Sakellaropoulou, who was elected as the first female President of Greece on 22 January 2020 by the Hellenic Parliament, is a supporter of LGBT rights. Alexis Patelis, the Prime Minister Kyriakos Mitsotakis's Chief Economic Adviser, came out in an interview, saying: "The Prime Minister has met my husband, I have met his wife", marking the first time that a high-ranking official came out publicly in Greece. Also, Nicholas Yatromanolakis is the first openly gay person to hold a ministerial rank in the Government of Greece, assuming office in the January 2021 government reshuffle, as Deputy Minister of Culture and Sports.

On 24 September 2023, Greek-American Stefanos Kasselakis, a former Goldman Sachs trader, unexpectedly won SYRIZA's leadership elections with a 56% of total votes, being the first member of the LGBT community and the Greek diaspora to ascend to the leadership of Greece's primary opposition party. Kasselakis is married to Tyler McBeth, an American nurse.

In April 2025, Electra Rome Dochtsi became chair of Volt Greece, making her the first trans woman to be elected chair of a Greek political party.

== Social conditions ==
=== Gay culture ===
Athens has a large number of LGBTQ associations and a developing gay village in the Gazi, Athens neighborhood. A pride parade event, the "Athens Pride" and an international Gay and Lesbian film festival, the "Outview", are held annually.

There is also a large gay scene in Thessaloniki with gay/lesbian bars/clubs and several friendly mixed venues, and several LGBT organisations. In June 2012, the city got its own annual pride event (Thessaloniki Pride). One of the most notable events in Thessaloniki, concerning LGBT rights, is the attempt to raise a 20m long banner, urging people to boycott the Sochi 2014 Winter Olympics, on the city's most famous landmark, the White Tower. The attempt was quickly stopped by the local police, but the event was advertised in online media.

In the beginning of the 20th century, Kaliarda emerged as an anti-language in the Greek LGBT community as a form of protection, especially in cruising spaces.

Greece is one of Europe's most popular LGBT tourist destinations, particularly its largest cities Athens and Thessalonica as well as several of its islands. The gay scene of Mykonos is well-known, with many establishments catering for the LGBT community. Lesbos also is famous internationally for its lesbian scene in Eressos.

=== Pride parades ===
The first attempt to organize a pride parade in Greece was made by AKOE (Greek: Απελευθερωτικό Κίνημα Ομοφυλόφιλων Ελλάδας; Liberation Movement of Homosexuals of Greece) on 28 June 1980 in Athens, defining it as a political event. It was repeated two years later at the Zappeion Mansion. Numerous similar events took place over the following years, and in different locations. In 1992, 1994 and 1995, the events were held at Strefi Hill, whereas in 1996 and 1998 they were organized at the Pedion tou Areos. In 1998, it took place in an enclosed area. In Thessaloniki, the first corresponding event was organized by OPOTH (Ομάδα Πρωτοβουλίας Ομοφυλόφιλων Θεσσαλονίκης; Gay Friendly Group of Thessaloniki) in the 1990s.

Since then, LGBT events have been held in other cities, including in Heraklion, Patras, Santorini, Corfu and Mykonos. Thessaloniki was selected in 2017 to host EuroPride 2020.

==== Athens Pride ====
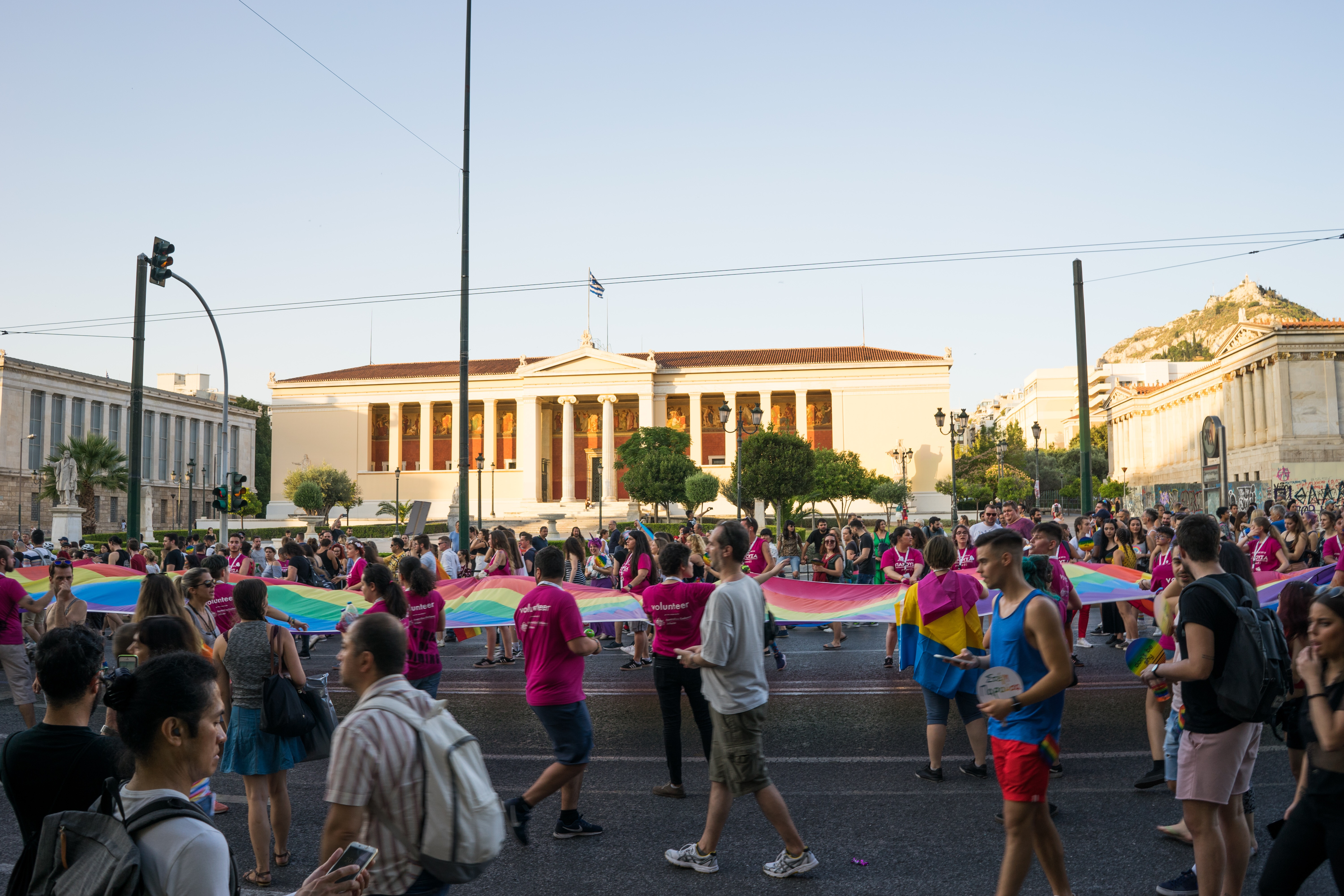
Athens Pride in 2018

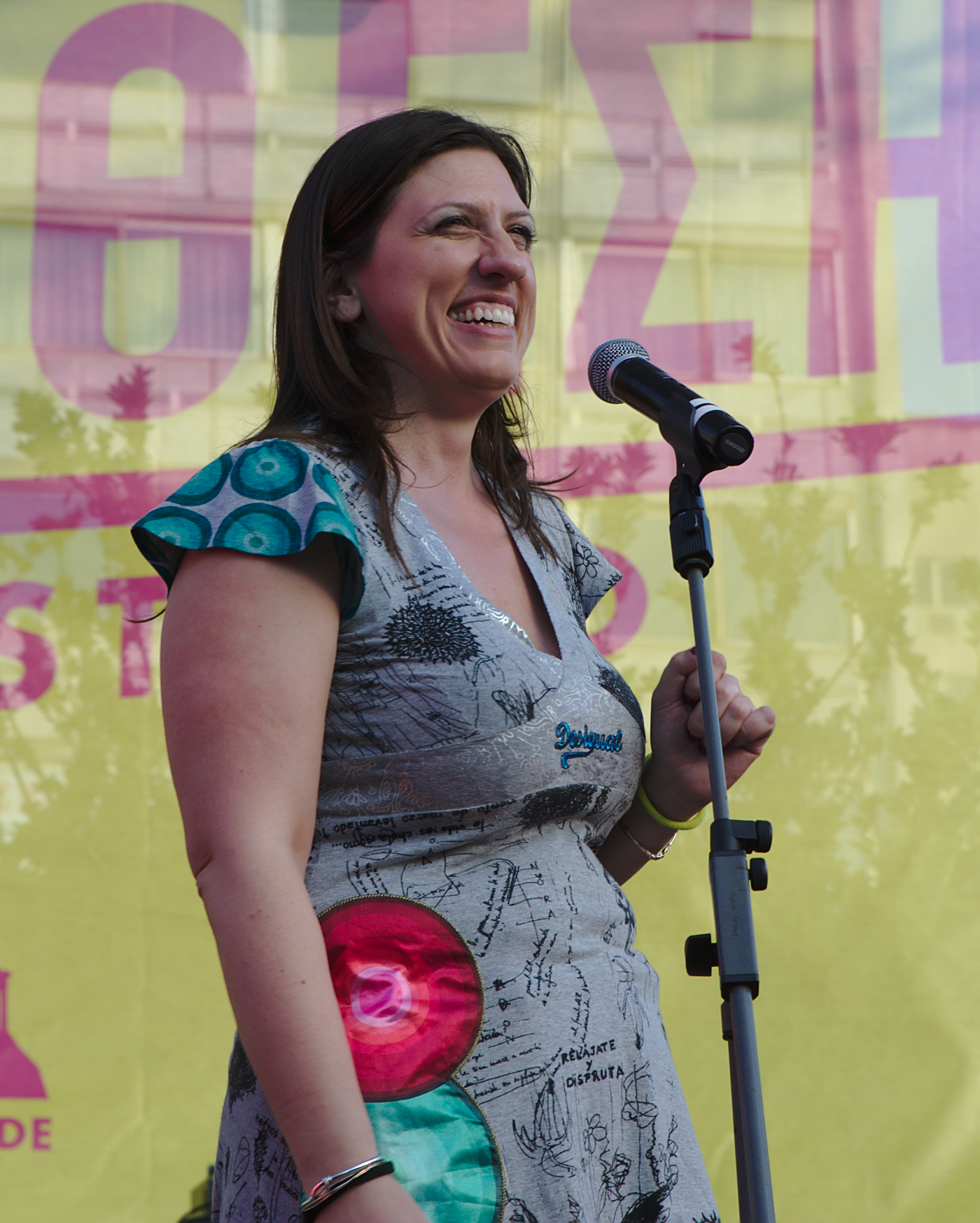
Then Speaker of Parliament Zoe Konstantopoulou at Athens Pride 2015

The Athens Pride is an annual LGBT pride parade and festival held every June in the centre of Athens. It has been held 14 times:

- 1st Athens Pride "Affection, Love and Life deserve respect" (25 June 2005)
- 2nd Athens Pride "Open, Loud, Proud" (24 June 2006)
- 3rd Athens Pride "Love doesn't discriminate, it differentiates" (23 June 2007)
- 4th Athens Pride "Our right" (7 June 2008)
- 5th Athens Pride "100% Equality" (13 June 2009)
- 6th Athens Pride "We are everywhere" (5 June 2010)
- 7th Athens Pride "Kiss me everywhere" (4 June 2011)
- 8th Athens Pride "Love me, it's free" (9 June 2012)
- 9th Athens Pride "ATHENS is ours" (8 June 2013)
- 10th Athens Pride "Family Matter" (14 June 2014)
- 11th Athens Pride "Choose a side" (13 June 2015)
- 12th Athens Pride "You are not born a woman/man, you become one" (11 June 2016)
- 13th Athens Pride "It's an Education Matter" (10 June 2017)
- 14th Athens Pride "What Pride means" (9 June 2018)

==== Thessaloniki Pride ====
Thessaloniki staged its annual pride event for the first time in 22–23 June 2012, following Mayor Boutaris's promise to back a public LGBT event in the city. The first Thessaloniki Pride festival enjoyed massive popular support from the city, its periphery and the region, which was a heavy blow for the city's metropolitan Anthimos, who had called believers to react.

One year later, in one of his announcements just a few days before the pride event of 2013, he stated that, the Holy Metropolis of Thessaloniki would once again have to tolerate the sad and unacceptable festival of the homosexuals who want to "celebrate their sickness in a carnival sort of way". He also asked parents to keep their children and themselves away from "such pointless and unnatural celebrations". However, many families were present and the two-day festival ended in a festive atmosphere with many parties, galleries and celebrations all around the city. The 2nd Thessaloniki Pride was dedicated to freedom of any kind, including the freedom of gender expression.

In 2014, Thessaloniki was the European Youth Capital and the 3rd Thessaloniki Pride was included to its official programme. Accordingly, it was dedicated to LGBT youth and their families. By general assessment the 2014 pride event was a major success, with the participation of 10,000 people in the parade, along with the Mayor Yiannis Boutaris and a block of diplomats. Some described it as best LGBT pride festival that Thessaloniki has ever had.

That year, vigil masses took place along with gatherings of believers, where priests made an outcry over the "desecration of holy Thessaloniki", the "imposition of Islam and homosexuality by the New World Order, the gay pride events which are part of a Western conspiracy, the "appointment of homosexual male and female bishops and protested over the victory of Conchita Wurst at the Eurovision Song Contest. Metropolitan Anthimos once again made similar comments about it in an interview, deeming it as "disgraceful", "challenging", "a perversion of the human existence", adding that the Church orders to "Not give what is holy to dogs". He also claimed that the use of the term "festival" for the event is erroneous.

The festival has been held ten times:

- 1st Thessaloniki Pride "One love, a thousand colors" (22–23 June 2012)
- 2nd Thessaloniki Pride "Free spirits, Free Bodies" (14–15 June 2013)
- 3rd Thessaloniki Pride "It's time for us" (20–21 June 2014)
- 4th Thessaloniki Pride "I Deserve, I Demand. Marriage, Name, Respect" (19–20 June 2015)
- 5th Thessaloniki Pride "Love each other" (New Commandment) (24–25 June 2016)
- 6th Thessaloniki Pride "Come as you are" (1-2 July 2017)
- 7th Thessaloniki Pride "It's a family thing" (20-23 June 2018)
- 8th Thessaloniki Pride "We are making history" (18-22 June 2019)
- 9th Thessaloniki Pride "Which Normality?" – EuroPride (20-25 September 2020)
- 10th Thessaloniki Pride "Acceptance Lesson" (20-26 June 2022)

==== Crete Pride ====
The first pride parade in Crete was held on 26–27 June 2015 in Heraklion, becoming the island's first "Festival for Gender and Sexuality Liberation Visibility".

- 1st LGBTQI+ Crete Pride 2015 (26-27 June 2015)
- 2nd LGBTQI+ Crete Pride 2016 (9-10 July 2016)
- 3rd LGBTQI+ Crete Pride 2017 (30 June–1 July 2017)

==== Patras Pride ====
The first pride parade in Patras, the third biggest city in Greece, was held in 2016.

- 1st LGBTQI+ Pride Πάτρας 2016 "See it differently" (17-18 June 2016)
- 2nd LGBTQI+ Pride Πάτρας 2017 "One body, many identities" (23-24 June 2017)

=== Homophobia ===
==== Discrimination by religious authorities ====
Responding to government proposals in 2008 to introduce legal rights for cohabiting couples, Archbishop Ieronymos of Athens, the leader of the autocephalous Orthodox Church of Greece, suggested that "There is a need to change with the time". It is unclear, however, whether this view applied to same-sex couples, particularly as the Church has previously opposed gay rights in general and civil union laws in particular.

Following government talks in November 2013 regarding the legalisation of civil unions for homosexual couples, the Metropolitan of Piraeus Seraphim voiced vehement opposition against it, threatening that he can and will excommunicate any MPs who should vote for it. Moreover, he added that the bill "legalises the corruption of the human existence and physiology and cements the psychopathological diversion that is homosexuality". Additionally, he mentioned that such movements constitute "significant offenses of public decency" by sending out messages of "perverted sexual behaviours" to young people that "torpedo the foundations of family and society".

In August 2014, during discussions about the long-awaited vote for an anti-racism bill, several Metropolitans voiced their opposition to it due to certain articles pertinent to the criminalization of hate speech against, among others, homosexuals, with increased penalties for civil servants (members of the clergy included) who engage in it during their duties. The Metropolitan of Piraeus Seraphim accused the Greek PM, Antonis Samaras, of "selling his soul for a few extra months in office", criticized the draft law for "the introduction of other sexual orientations and other gender identities", the fact that the "psychopathological aversion and the inelegant mimicking of the other sex" would be protected by Greek law and compared homosexuality with paedophilia and bestiality.

The Metropolitan of Gortyna Ieremias, citing Bible passages, called homosexuals "dogs", argued that under the new bill "several prophets and Saints would be regarded as racists", and characterized it as a "horrible and deplorable" law while adding a homophobic word play. At the same time, the Metropolitan of Konitsa Andreas rejected the bill under the claim that it aims to "cover the perversion that is homosexuality". The religious reaction eventually resulted in Antonis Samaras accepting the church's objections and not including articles relative to the protection of homosexuals in the bill. Moreover, the PM reassured the religious leaders who disapproved of the bill that, "as long as he is in office, there's no way the parliament will expand civil unions to same-sex couples".

In September 2014, provisions on the criminalization of hate speech towards LGBT individuals were approved. The criminalization of LGBT-oriented hate speech led to the furious reaction of Metropolitan Seraphim who called the law "an oppression of the Greek Justice system" and "the cancellation of the freedom of speech" as imposed by "the nationalistic system and the New World Order instructors".

==== Discrimination in education ====
According to a 2020 survey conducted by the group Colour Youth, titled "First Greek National School Climate Survey," LGBTQ+ students report hearing homophobic remarks and slurs at high rates, including from teachers. According to survey results, 1 in 3 report undergoing verbal harassment due to their identity, 1 in 7 report physical harassment and/or violence, and 1 in 3 report having ever experienced sexual harassment, including sexual comments and inappropriate touching. Over half (53,4%) of respondents report having ever experienced some form of violence or harassment due to their identifty overall.

===== Prominent incidents =====
In February 2022, a middle school teacher at the Ilion Music School insulted a male student because he showed up in class wearing a skirt, saying that they were "a disgrace for society." This prompted a strong backlash and condemnation, with the school's director and the Association of Parents condemning the incident and the Greek Ministry of Education opening an investigation against the teacher. The next day, the victim's male classmates showed up at the school wearing skirts and his female classmates in pants and ties, to protest against the teacher and express their support to the student.

==== Discrimination by media and public bodies ====
Several issues have been raised about the Greek media and their frequently discriminatory attitude towards LGBT individuals such as through the use of censorship, something partly attributed to the regulation authority, or Greek National Council for Radio and Television (NCRTV). Below is a list of some homophobic/transphobic incidents by the Greek media and other companies and bodies:

- In November 2003, NCRTV fined one of the largest TV networks in Greece, Mega, 100,000 euros, partly for having aired a kiss between two male characters of the popular TV show Klise ta Matia (Κλείσε τα Μάτια). In December 2006, Greece's Council of State, the country's Supreme Administrative Court, annulled this decision, ruling that NCRTV's fine was unconstitutional. According to the court, the TV scene reflected an "existing social reality, related to a social group, among many that make up an open and democratic society, whose sexual preferences are not to be condemned". Moreover, this was not the first time that a kiss between two male characters was aired in Greek television and the decision was heavily criticised by the Greek media as hypocritical and anachronistic.
- On 21 December 2004, the NCRTV fined 94 Epikoinonia FM (94 Eπικοινωνία FM), a municipal radio station in Athens, 5,000 euros, judging the content of the Athens Gay and Lesbian Radio Show as "degrading", resulting in the station cancelling the show.
- In September 2005, NCRTV formally enquired another one of Greece's largest TV networks, ANT1 (Antenna), for airing a publicity spot, by a popular chewing gum brand, depicting two women kissing.
- In March 2010, Greek channel Mega was fined for airing the Greek movie Straight Story, whose plot revolved around the story of a straight man in a fictional world in which homosexuality was the norm and heterosexuality was frowned upon.
- In April and May 2010, the Greek Star Channel was fined for two episodes of its show Fotis & Maria Live. In both episodes, there were transgender guests.
- In January 2011, MAD TV and MTV Greece blurred out two male kiss scenes from the video clips of Katy Perry's "Firework" and Pink's "Raise your Glass".
- Starting in 2012, the terms "gay", "lesbian" and "transvestite" were bleeped in episodes of ANT1's comedy series Konstantinou kai Elenis.
- On 15 October 2012, ERT aired the pilot episode of British television series Downton Abbey, cutting out a scene depicting two men kissing. The managing director of ERT, Costas Spyropoulos, cited timing of the programme (aired at 10pm local time) and parental guidelines as reasons for the episode not being aired in full. But after wide protest, the episode aired fully a few days later and at an even earlier hour (7pm). Spyroploylos was heavily criticised by media and the general director of state TV, who formally apologised for the censoring.
- In February 2013, the terms "gay" and "lesbian" appear in the form of dots in the subtitles of a foreign programme on MTV Greece, despite the fact that the programme was broadcast late at night.
- On 17 May 2013, one day after the second semi-final of the 2013 Eurovision contest where Krista Siegfrids, representing Finland, performed the song "Marry me" and symbolically kissed a female dancer as a way to push for same-sex marriage in her country, the Greek gossip TV show FThis TV of ANT1 channel blurred the kiss between the two women when showing footage from the contest.
- In June 2013, the NCRTV rejected the request of the 2013 Athens LGBT pride organisers to air the event's TV spot free of charge in all of the major Greek TV channels as it was not deemed a public service message. The NCRTV representatives claimed that their decision was taken on the grounds that the spot "cannot be described as a social message".
- In July 2013, the term "gay" was translated as "girly" in the subtitles of the comedy series Joey on Star Channel. At the same time, the channel was criticized for its conservatism and homophobia when it came to the translation of the series Gossip Girl; following the remarks of the NCRTV regarding the frequency of issues referring to homosexuality, sex and drugs in the show and the channel's unwillingness to move the series to a later hour, a middle solution was found that allowed it to keep the show at the same time but to be much stricter in the translation of words relevant to the aforementioned topics, with the result that terms such as "lesbian" were translated as "tomboy", "not-so-womanly" or "spinster".
- In September 2013, a scene from the popular series Glee showing a lesbian couple kissing on a bed without the portrayal of any nudity was censored by Alpha TV.
- The company running Athens Metro refused to placard posters of the upcoming pride event at metro stations in 2013. In 2014, it once again rejected the request of the Athens Pride organisers on the grounds of lack of space for the placement of advertisements.
- In September 2015, the NCRTV imposed a fine on Skai TV for broadcasting two shows relating to, among others, gay and lesbian sex. The channel responded by turning to the Council of State, which, however, declined the former's request to cancel the fine by adding that the shows "did not have the appropriate level required by the social mission of television".

==== Discrimination by politicians ====
- In August 2014, Nikolaos Nikolopoulos, a Greek MP, wrote an insulting tweet on his personal account, commenting on the engagement of Luxembourg's Prime Minister Xavier Bettel to his partner Gauthier Destenay. In it, he said "From Europe of nation countries, to Europe of ... faggots - the president of Luxembourg got engaged to his lover". The tweet outraged many Greeks, who asked for an intervention by Greek PM Antonis Samaras. Bettel himself replied to his tweet by saying that the relations between Luxembourg and Greece are "perfect" and will not be affected by an isolated politician. Nikolopoulos insisted by defending his point, saying that the PM should be ashamed.
- Anastasios Nerantzis, a New Democracy MP, also took part in the dispute over the inclusion of same-sex couples in the civil union law making similar comments with Nikolopoulos; after comparing homosexuality with bestiality and paedophilia, he added that civil unions for homosexuals "have no place in our country".

==== Homophobic violence ====
Colour Youth, a non-governmental organisation, reported 101 incidents of homophobic and transphobic violence from 2009 to 2015, with 75 of them in 2015. Five of the attacks caused serious bodily harm, while the majority concerned verbal attacks. According to the Athens-based Racist Violence Recording Network (RVRN), Greece saw a surge in racist and homophobic violence in 2023, with 61 attacks against LGBT people in that year alone. It has been noted that such numbers are likely underestimations of violence due to under-reporting of incidents to authorities.

According to the Fundamental Rights Agency's 2024 LGBTIQ survey on the EU, 13% of all LGBT respondents in Greece said they had been attacked in the five years before the survey, 5% said they had been attacked in the year before the survey, and 54% said they had been harassed, lining up with the EU average. According to the survey, only 9% reported incidents of violence or sexual assault to the police.

===== Political ties =====
The far-right neo-Nazi ultranationalist criminal organisation and former political party Golden Dawn has made a very infamous statement when addressing gay men and women, saying that "after the immigrants, you're next". There have been allegations that members of the Greek police force were cooperating with Golden Dawn members, which may explain why several transgender women have been arrested during Thessaloniki Pride for no reason by the police, brutally attacked and illegally detained on the grounds of "keeping the city clean".

== Public opinion ==
Support for same-sex marriage (2020)
1. For (56.0%)
2. Against (40.0%)
3. Don't know (4.00%)
Support for the LGBT people having equal rights as everyone else (2020 poll)
1. Against (10.0%)
2. For (90.0%)
Support for same-sex adoption (December 2021 poll)
1. Against (50.6%)
2. For (44.4%)
3. Don't know (5.00%)

A survey among Greek MPs, conducted in 2003 and presented by the Hellenic Homosexual Community (EOK), raised the issue of recognising taxation, inheritance and other legal rights to same-sex couples. The results of the survey showed that 41% of MPs surveyed favored granting such rights, while 55% were against it. Among PASOK MPs, 55% were favorable, compared to just 27% of New Democracy MPs. The party with the highest MP favorable responses was Synaspismos (67%), while the majority of Communist Party MPs abstained. MPs favorable responses were higher among women, younger and Athenian MPs.

A 2006 study among Greek students in Heraklion, Crete, surveyed their attitudes towards male homosexuality. Two scales were used and translated into Greek along with several questions that formed a self-completed questionnaire. The main findings showed that there were differences among the different schools in terms of homophobic expression and that "the main predictors influencing homophobia score were: willingness to defend and protect gay rights, conversations with gay individuals, religiosity, politicization and having gay friends".

A Eurobarometer survey published in December 2006 showed that 15% of Greeks surveyed supported same-sex marriage and 11% recognised same-sex couple's right to adopt. These figures were considerably below the 25-member European Union average of 44% and 32% respectively, and placed Greece in the lowest ranks of the European Union along with Romania, Latvia, Poland, Cyprus, Malta, Lithuania, Slovakia and Bulgaria.

A Eurobarometer survey published in January 2007 ("Discrimination in the European Union") showed that 77% of Greeks believed that being gay or lesbian in their country "tends to be a disadvantage", while the European Union average was 55%. 68% of Greeks agreed that discrimination on the basis of sexual orientation was "widespread" in Greece (EU: 50%), and 37% that it was more widespread in than five years before (EU: 31%). 84% of Greeks also reported not having any gay or lesbian friends or acquaintances (EU: 65%).

A Kapa Research (major Greek polling firm) survey on behalf of the Greek Institute of Psychological & Sexual Health, published in the Greek newspaper Ta Nea on 20 September 2010, showed that 64% of Greeks agreed with the legalization of same-sex partnerships and 24% disagreed; as for the legalization of same-sex marriage, 39% of Greeks agreed and 52% disagreed.

In June 2013, the Pew Research Center released data where they conducted surveys of respondents in some 40 countries on the question of whether the respondents believed their society should or should not accept homosexuality. Pew Research questioners scientifically asked respondents in Greece this question and found that amongst those asked, a majority 53% of those Greek respondents believed their society should accept homosexuality, while 40% of the respondents believed that society should not accept homosexuality. Amongst those Greeks surveyed between the ages of 18 and 29 years of age support for society accepting homosexuality was at a higher 66% than the overall 53%. For those respondents aged 30 to 49 support was too at a higher 62%, but a lower 40% for those respondents 50 years and older.

Answer	Ages 18–29	Ages 30–49	Ages 50 or higher	Men	Women	Total
Yes	66%	62%	40%	47%	59%	53%
No	n/a	n/a	n/a	n/a	n/a	40%

On 11 April 2015, the newspaper To Vima published a survey conducted by Kapa Research, which showed that 39% of respondents supported same-sex marriage and 51% were against it. In the same survey, 66% of respondents agreed with the statement that homosexuality should be accepted by society, while 28% believed that homosexuality should not be accepted by society.

On 12 May 2015, Greece had its first survey ever showing majority support for same-sex marriage at 56%, while 35% opposed it. The survey was based on 1,431 respondents and was conducted by Focus Bari. A very high percentage of respondents (76%) agreed that homosexuality should be accepted by society and 70% agreed that civil partnerships should be extended to same-sex couples. However, respondents remained sceptical about adoption by same-sex couples with only 30% supporting it, while 56% opposed it. Only 14% believed that homosexuality is a mental disorder and 54% stated that stricter laws should exist to punish homophobic crimes (hate speech in particular).

In December 2015, a poll, conducted by the University of Macedonia during the week before the civil unions bill became law, found that 56% of the public agreed with the law, while 29% strongly opposed it.

A survey by Pew found that the Greek respondents (having been polled in 2015–2016) gave the most cultural liberal responses regarding LGBT rights among Orthodox Christians from various countries, except for respondents from the United States, and the most liberal responses of all Orthodox-majority countries. Specifically, 50% of practicing Greek Orthodox Christian respondents said that homosexuality should be accepted by society, while 45% disagreed. Regarding legalizing same-sex marriage, 25% of practicing Greek Orthodox Christians were in favor and 72% were opposed.

A poll conducted by DiaNeosis in 2018 showed that 40,8% of Greeks supported same-sex marriage and 24% were in favor of adoption by same-sex couples. The poll found a large age gap with 58% of those aged 17–24 and 47% of those aged 25–39 being supporters of same-sex marriage, in contrast to only 29% of those aged over 65. Adoption by same-sex couples was supported by 49% among those aged 17–24, but only 11% of those over 65 shared the same view.

The 2019 Eurobarometer found that 39% of Greeks thought same-sex marriage should be allowed throughout Europe, 56% were against. The same poll found that 64% of respondents agreed with the statement: "Gay, lesbian and bisexual people should have the same rights as heterosexual people", whereas 32% disagreed. Those figures marked an increase of 6% and 2%, respectively, compared to the 2015 Eurobarometer survey.

A 2020 poll conducted by the Friedrich Naumann Foundation in cooperation with the KAPA Research, found that the concept of liberalism is becoming increasingly popular in Greece, with the majority of the Greeks viewing it positively. Also, 71% of the respondents believe that homosexuality should be accepted in the Greek society, and 90% of the respondents believe that the homosexual people should have equal rights as everyone else, marking a sharp increase compared to previous polls. Same-sex marriage is favoured by 56% of the respondents, while adoption by same-sex couples is supported by 40%.

A 2022 poll conducted by the Eteron Institute, shows that the youth in Greece is increasingly liberal, with 70% of the young Greeks aged 17–24 being in favor of joint adoptions by same-sex couples while only 37% of the elder Greeks aged above 65 are in favor, marking is a sharp increase compared to the 2018 DiaNeosis poll where adoption by same-sex couples was supported by the 49% of those aged 17–24, but only 11% of those over 65.

The 2023 Eurobarometer found that 57% of Greeks thought same-sex marriage should be allowed throughout Europe, and 57% agreed that "there is nothing wrong in a sexual relationship between two persons of the same sex". In 2024, opinion poll conducted by Proto Thema newspaper, found that nearly 55% of Greeks support gay marriage and 53% support adoption.

A poll conducted in late January 2024 by Metron Analysis showed that 62% of respondents supported same sex marriage, with 36% opposed. However, regarding adoption rights for same sex couples, only 30% expressed positive views, with 69% opposed. Acceptance rates were higher among those who identify as left-wing and center-left, while declining in the center and center-right.

== Summary table ==
Right	Status	Notes
Same-sex sexual activity
Same-sex sexual activity legal	Yes	Since 1951
Equal age of consent	Yes	Since 2015
Discrimination protections
Anti-discrimination laws in employment	Yes	Since 2005
Anti-discrimination laws in all other areas (incl. provision of goods and services, indirect discrimination, hate speech)	Yes	Since 2014
Anti-discrimination and hate speech laws covering gender identity in all areas	Yes	Since 2014
Hate crimes based on sexual orientation and gender identity prohibited	Yes	Since 2015
Military service
LGBT people allowed to serve openly in the military	Yes	Since 2002
Same-sex relationships
Same-sex civil unions	Yes	Since 2015
Civil same-sex marriage(s)	Yes	Since 2024
Religious same-sex marriage(s)	No	
Adoption and family planning
Adoption by single LGBT individuals	Yes	Since 1996
Foster care by same-sex couples	Yes	Since 2018
Stepchild adoption by same-sex couples	Yes	Since 2024
Joint adoption by same-sex couples	Yes	Since 2024
Automatic parenthood for children of same-sex couples	No	
Access to IVF for lesbian couples	No	
Altruistic surrogacy for gay couples	No	
Commercial surrogacy for gay couples	No	Banned regardless of sexual orientation
Transgender rights
Right to change legal gender	Yes	Since 2010
Sterilisation and Sex reassignment surgery not required for the change of legal gender	Yes	Since 2017
Third gender option	No	
Gender-neutral names on birth certificates	Yes	Since 2018
Correction of birth certificates for children of trans couples	No	
Intersex rights
Intersex minors protected from invasive surgical procedures	Yes	Since 2022
Other
MSMs allowed to donate blood	No	Blocked by the Council of State (Proposed)
Conversion therapy banned by law	Yes	Since 2022
Sex education in schools covers sexual orientation and gender identity	Yes	Since 2017
Homosexuality and Transsexuality declassified as illnesses	Yes	

== See also ==
- Human rights in Greece
- LGBT history in Greece
- LGBT rights in Europe
- LGBT rights in the European Union
- Same-sex union court cases
