= Urbanism =

Study of peoples interactions with their city's infrastructure

Urbanism is the scientific study of how inhabitants of urban areas, such as towns and cities, interact with the built environment. It is a direct component of disciplines such as Urban Design, urban planning &Urban Management, profession focusing on the design, planning and management of urban areas, and urban sociology, an academic field which studies urban life.

Many urbanists, designers, planners, geographers, architects and sociologists investigate the way people live in densely populated urban areas. There is a wide variety of different theories and approaches to the study of urbanism. However, in some contexts internationally, urbanism is synonymous with urban planning, and urbanist refers to an urban planner.

The term urbanism was coined in the late nineteenth century by the Spanish civil engineer Ildefons Cerdà, whose intent was to create an autonomous activity focused on the spatial organization of the city. Urbanism's emergence in the early 20th century was associated with the rise of centralized manufacturing, mixed-use neighborhoods, social organizations and networks, and what has been described as "the convergence between political, social, and economic citizenship".

Urbanism can be understood as placemaking and the creation of place identity at a citywide level, however as early as 1938 Louis Wirth wrote that it is necessary to stop 'identify[ing] urbanism with the physical entity of the city', go 'beyond an arbitrary boundary line' and consider how 'technological developments in transportation and communication have enormously extended the urban mode of living beyond the confines of the city itself.'

== Concepts ==
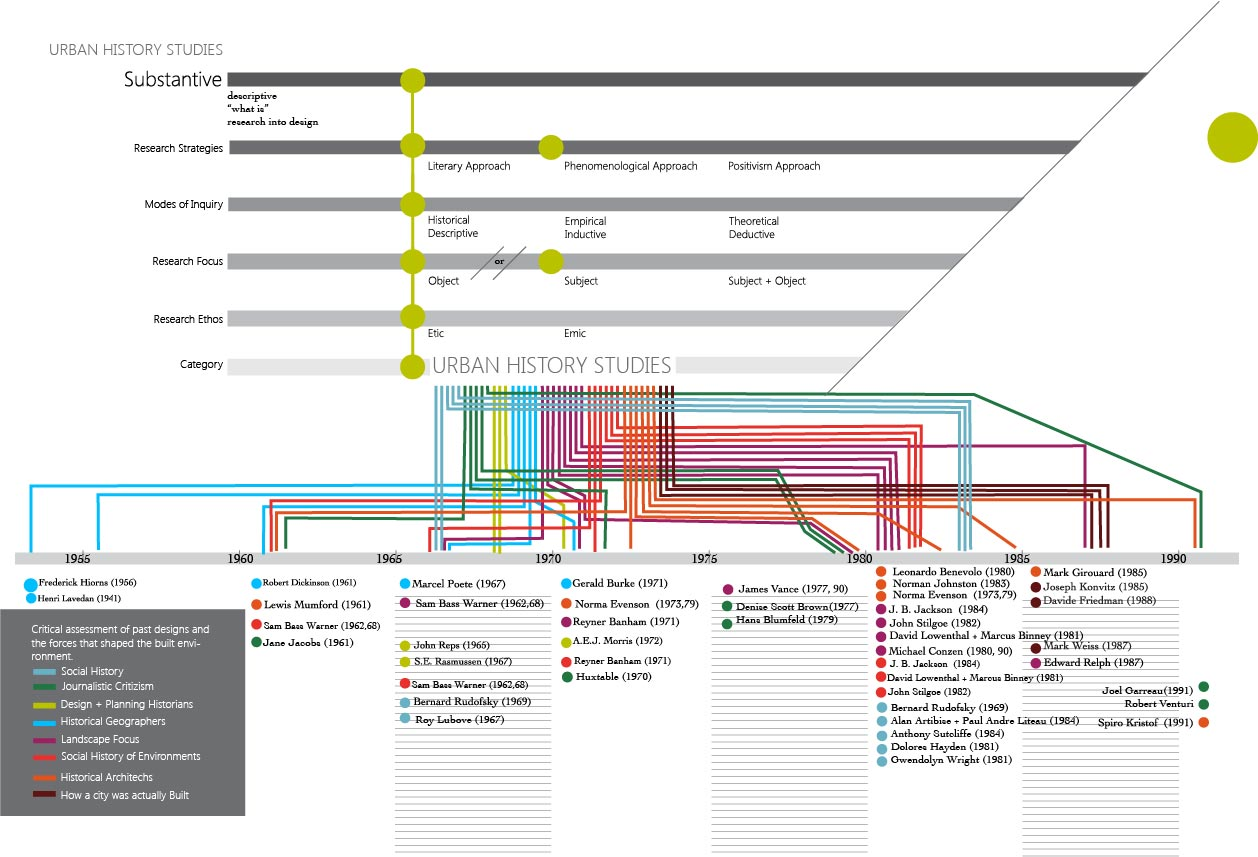
Urbanism theory writers of the late 20th century

=== Network-based theories ===
Gabriel Dupuy applied network theory to the field of urbanism and suggested that the single dominant characteristic of modern urbanism is its networked character, as opposed to segregated conceptions of space (i.e. zones, boundaries and edges).

Stephen Graham and Simon Marvin argue that we are witnessing a post-urban environment where decentralized, loosely connected neighborhoods and zones of activity assume the former organizing role played by urban spaces. Their theory of splintering urbanism involves the "fragmentation of the social and material fabric of cities" into "cellular clusters of globally connected high-service enclaves and network ghettos" driven by electronic networks that segregate as much as they connect. Dominique Lorrain argues that the process of splintering urbanism began towards the end of the 20th century with the emergence of the gigacity, a new form of a networked city characterised by three-dimensional size, network density and the blurring of city boundaries.

Manuel Castells suggested that within a network society, "premium" infrastructure networks (high-speed telecommunications, "smart" highways, global airline networks) selectively connect together the most favored users and places and bypass the less favored. Graham and Marvin argue that attention to infrastructure networks is responsive to crises or collapse, rather than sustained and systematic, because of a failure to understand the links between urban life and urban infrastructure networks.

=== Other modern theorists ===
Douglas Kelbaugh identifies three paradigms within urbanism: New Urbanism, Everyday Urbanism, and Post-Urbanism.

Paul L. Knox refers to one of many trends in contemporary urbanism as the "aestheticization of everyday life".

Alex Krieger states that urban design is less a technical discipline than a mind-set based on a commitment to cities.

Mohammad Habib Reza — architect and urban theorist who introduced New Contextualism, an urban and architectural philosophy that grounds design in layered contexts such as cultural, ecological, historical, and social, while promoting equity, belonging, and sustainability.

Other contemporary urbanists such as Edward Soja and Liz Ogbu focus on urbanism as a field for applying principles of community building and spatial justice.

== See also ==
- New urbanism
- Ecological urbanism extends on concepts of Landscape urbanism
- Feminist urbanism
- Green urbanism
- Landscape urbanism, an urbanism where cities are seen though the lens of landscape architecture and ecology
- Latino urbanism
- Principles of Intelligent Urbanism
- Sustainable urbanism
- Tactical urbanism
- Unitary urbanism, a critique of urbanism as a technology of power by the situationists
- Urban economics, the application of economic models and tools to analyse the urban issues such as crime, house and public transit
- Urban geography
- Urbanate, a living environment envisioned by the Technocracy movement
- Urban vitality
- World Urbanism Day
