= Takis Tsoukalas =

Greek television personality (born 1958)

- Born: Panagiotis Tsoukalas; 22 March 1958 (age 68); Spata, Attica, Greece
- Occupation: Television personality
- Years active: 1999–present
- Known for: Fan of Olympiacos

Panagiotis (Takis) Tsoukalas (Greek: Παναγιώτης (Τάκης) Τσουκαλάς, born 22 March 1958) is a Greek presenter of fan TV shows.

== Early life ==
He was born and raised in Spata and then moved to Kaminia in Piraeus, where he still lives today. He was a football player of Aittitos Spata.

He is an organized fan of Olympiacos. The show entitled "GOODBYE" (Greek: ΑΝΤΕ ΓΕΙΑ) that it presents, has as its main theme the commentary on various sports in which Olympiacos competes, with an emphasis on football. Initially, the show premiered in 1999 under the name "Gate 7". His co-presenter is his best man Akis Vardalakis, also an organized fan of Olympiacos.

After his TV show on June 16, 2015, he was attacked by unknown men with iron fists outside his home in Kaminia. Accordingly, in April 2017, he was attacked with a hammer by a 36-year-old man, as a result of which he was hospitalized.

== Criticism and litigation ==
In November 2018, he commented with expressions that were characterized as racist by the Greek and foreign media through his broadcast against Thanasis Antetokounmpo whom he called, among other things, a "monkey". The statements caused strong reactions from the Greek National Council for Radio and Television. Also, a lawsuit was filed by Panagiotis Dimitras, on behalf of the Hellenic Observatory of the Helsinki Agreements, in the context of the control of racist crimes.
