= LGBTQ history in Greece =

This article is about the history of lesbian, gay, bisexual and transgender (LGBT) people in Greece.

== 2nd millennium AD ==
- In 1858, the Ottoman Empire decriminalizes homosexual relationships.
- Homosexual practice was decriminalized in 1951.

== 3rd millennium AD ==
- In November 2003, NCRTV fined one of the TV networks in Greece, Mega, with 100,000 Euros, partly for having aired a kiss between two male characters of the popular TV show 'Klise ta Matia' (Greek: Κλείσε τα Μάτια). In December 2006, Greece's Council of State, the country's Supreme administrative court, annulled this decision though, ruling that NCRTV's fine was unconstitutional.
- In 2015, civil unions were legalized for same-sex couples
- In 2017, the Legal Gender Recognition Law is passed
- On May 6, 2018, same-sex couples in civil partnerships Greece gained the right to foster children, although adoption remained illegal.
- Since 16 February 2024, same-sex marriage has been legal in this country after the passage of the legislation in the Parliament, making it the 21st country in Europe and the 36th in the world to allow same-sex couples to marry.

== See also ==
- History of LGBT
- Intersex people in ancient Greece
- Lesbianism in ancient Greece
- LGBT rights in Greece
