= Sheffield School of Architecture =

Architecture school of the University of Sheffield

The Sheffield School of Architecture is an architecture school in Sheffield, England, and part of the University of Sheffield. It is located on the top six floors of the Arts Tower. The Times and Sunday Times Good University Guide 2015 placed SSoA among the top two schools of architecture in the UK (up from 3rd in the Times 2014 Guide). The school was rated 2nd by architectural practices in the Architects' Journal, AJ100 2014 list of the best schools of architecture in the UK. It has a strong social and political agenda.

It is one of the longest established architecture schools in the UK, having opened in 1908. It has courses accredited by the Architects Registration Board (ARB) and the Royal Institute of British Architects (RIBA). In the Research Excellence Framework (REF) 2014 SSoA ranked 4th in the UK. In 2020, both The Complete University Guide and Guardian ranked the school among top three in UK for architecture.

It also has an active student society (SUAS).

== Notable people ==
- Prof Peter Blundell Jones – architect, historian, academic and critic
- Prof Flora Samuel – Head of the Sheffield School of Architecture 2010–2013
- Prof Sarah Wigglesworth – architect
- Prof Jeremy Till – Head of the Sheffield School of Architecture 1999–2002
- Prof Doina Petrescu – Professor of architecture and design activism 2001–2025
