= Patricia Cadavid =

Colombian sound artist (born 1990)

Patricia Cadavid (born 1990) is a Colombian digital media and sound artist known for her works that explore themes of decoloniality, memory and technology. Since 2013 her works have appeared in international events and locations such as Ars Electronica Festival, Fowler Museum at UCLA, ADAF, NIME and SEAMUS conferences.

== Education ==
She holds a BFA degree from the University of Castilla–La Mancha in Spain, and an MA degree from the Technical University of Valencia also in Spain. She has also studied at the Interface Cultures Master Programme at the University of Art and Design Linz in Linz, Austria.

== Notable work ==
=== Electronic_Khipu_ ===
Its physical design is based on the Andean and Incan Khipu. Made of conductive rubber string sensors, the Electronic_Khiphu_ processes real-time knotting as MIDI information sent to Ableton Live to produce sound. This performance is meant to place the artist as a khipukamayuq (khipu knotter) as they revive ancestral practices.

=== #12OCT ===
12OCT critically examines Spain's colonial legacy and the colonization of the Americas, specifically referencing October 12. The installation incorporates social media and technology, featuring a Spanish ship floating in mapped waters. Hashtags such as #ladiadelaraza and #DiaDeLaResistenciaIndigena are tracked in real-time, influencing the movement of water streams that direct the ship toward, away from, or within the Americas.

Cadavid's work has been reviewed in ISEA Barcelona Catalogue, 2023; Ars Electronica Festival, 2019 and 2016; Lerchenfeld Magazine, University of Fine Arts of Hamburg, 2013; and featured in the MIT Press Computer Music Journal in 2021.
