= Liz Ogbu =

American architect, designer and urbanist

- Born: Oakland, California
- Education: Wellesley College MIT Harvard Graduate School of Design
- Occupation: Architect
- Awards: Global Innovation Prize, Holcim Foundation for Sustainable Construction, 2009 Titan Award, International Interior Design Association, 2019 Argon Award for Excellence in Sustainability, Southface Institute, 2020 Rubinger Community Fellowship, Local Initiatives Support Corporation, 2021
- Practice: Studio O
- Website: lizogbu.com

Liz Ogbu is an American architect, designer and urbanist whose work focuses on issues related to community building and spatial justice. She is the founder and principal of the design consulting firm Studio O.

== Early life and education ==
Ogbu was raised in Oakland, California, by parents who had both immigrated from Nigeria. Her first architecture project was designing a second home for her family in her father's village in Nigeria when she was in high school.

Ogbu earned her B.A. at Wellesley College, where she studied urban economics and sociology, while also taking architecture courses at MIT. She then studied architecture at the Harvard Graduate School of Design, where she earned a master's degree.

== Career ==
Ogbu is the principal of the design consulting firm Studio O, which she founded in 2012. Prior to launching her firm, Ogbu served as design director at Public Architecture, Innovator-in-Residence at the nonprofit wing of the design firm IDEO, and Senior Fellow of the Design Futures Council. She also taught courses in design at Stanford University, the University of California at Berkeley, and California College of the Arts.

One prominent component of Liz Ogbu's career is her study of spatial justice, which refers to "physical and emotional space to feel safe, heard, and in control of one's surroundings." According to Ogbu, spatial justice means that justice has a geography and that the equitable distribution of access, services, and outcomes is a basic human right: "A lack of spatial justice isn’t just about the deprivation of physical resources like housing or parks, but also the wide range of devastating interrelated social, economic, and health repercussions."

Ogbu has published research papers on various topics, one of which is "Reframing Practice: Identifying a Framework for Social Impact Design."

Ogbu is the 2009 recipient of the Global Innovation Prize from the Holcim Foundation for Sustainable Construction, a 2013 member of Public Interest Design's Top 100, and a 2014 Aspen Ideas Scholar. In 2016 she was the Droga Architect in Residence at the Australian Institute of Architects. She is the 2019 recipient of the International Interior Design Association's Titan Award for "service to the interior design profession," and the 2020 recipient of the Southface Institute's Argon Award for Excellence in Sustainability. In 2021 she received a Michael Rubinger Community Fellowship award from the Local Initiatives Support Corporation for her work advancing "the development of the Social Impact Protocol for affordable housing, a tool for evaluating and setting up accountability for the social impacts of housing redevelopment."

According to John Cary, author of Design for Good, "Liz Ogbu uniquely and bravely uses design to do the hard work of community healing, by acknowledging buried pain and trauma that is too often overlooked."

=== NOW Hunter's Point ===
One of Studio O's projects is a partnership with the San Francisco community of Bayview-Hunter's Point –– titled NOW Hunter's Point –– which aims to improve community infrastructure on a 34-acre plot of land vacated by the Pacific Gas and Electric Company while avoiding the negative impacts of gentrification.

In order to garner input from the community, Ogbu worked with StoryCorps to create a "listening station" where local people could record their stories. According to Harvard University's African American Design Nexus, "Residents, who understood the inevitability of redevelopment, sought to preserve the richly layered history of the site, and to tell stories which had previously had few outlets for sharing."

Since 2013, the site has been used as a venue for public art and performance, for providing community services, and as space for recreation. Events staged at the site based on suggestions from the community have included an annual circus, yoga classes, job training workshops, a harvest festival, outdoor film screenings, and health and wellness fairs.

At each event, Studio O has gathered feedback from attendees which it has used to inform further planning. According to Joann Gonchar of Architectural Record, "The collected data informed the nearly 2,000-foot-long shoreline park that they subsequently designed."

=== "Don't be a Dick" ===
In 2015, working in collaboration with illustrator Ping Zhu and co-authors in the community-engaged design group Equity Collective, Ogbu published a visual primer titled "Dick and Rick". In it, the character Rick is depicted taking cues from the community he seeks to serve, and as a result his design meets the needs of that community and is widely used. Dick, on the other hand, though well intentioned, fails to adequately incorporate community knowledge and agency into his design process, and as a result his design ends up underutilized. The moral of the story is summed up in the humorous slogan, "Don't be a Dick".

Both Dick and Rick are portrayed as white males, while most of the people in the community they serve are people of color. This was an intentional choice by the creators to reflect the reality of what a typical social impact design project looks like. According to Danya Sherman of Next City, "rather than call out specific individuals for being Dicks, the collective created the booklet as a reminder to themselves and all colleagues in the field to constantly ask themselves ... 'How can I be less of a Dick and more of a Rick?'"

== Design philosophy ==
According to Elizabeth Greenspan of Architect Magazine, Ogbu's practice is defined by a unique approach to design challenges in which she continually returns to the question: "How do you engage people who don’t have a seat at the table and think about them as co-designers in the process?"

Ogbu has been quoted as saying: "When people feel stuck and are feeling pain from generations of neglect, it’s not enough to have good intentions. Power needs to be shared to make space for people to share their stories. If we start with incomplete stories –– when we don’t do the work of reaching community voices –– no one can find complete solutions."

Eli Meixler of Fortune Magazine states that "Few people are more committed to the importance of cooperating with communities affected by design than Liz Ogbu."
