= Spatial politics =

Political science theory

Spatial politics is an interdisciplinary field that analyses the ways in which space and geographic location influence political processes, power relations, and social dynamics. It examines how spatial arrangements, urban planning, and territorial boundaries impact societal structures and the distribution of resources, privileges, and disadvantages among different groups.

Spatial politics analyses how the use of space in society is political, positing that spatial configurations are a reflection of and reinforcement of political decisions. It studies how the control and organisation of space exercises power and influence over people and resources. This can manifest in the design of cities, zoning laws, and the strategic placement of infrastructure, all of which can serve to maintain or challenge existing power structures.

== Background and common debates ==
=== The origins of spatial politics ===
The origins of spatial politics are diverse and multidisciplinary, reflecting the interplay between power dynamics, social relations, political processes and physical spaces. The origins of spatial politics can be traced back to various historical, geographical, theoretical and philosophical developments from several disciplines, including:

Urban studies - Urban studies is based on the study of the urban development of cities and regions. It helps with the understanding of human values, development, and the interactions they have with their physical environment. This includes understanding the spatial organisation of societies and the spatial aspects of cities and urban life, historically and in the present.

Marxist theory - Several marxist theorists have analysed the spatial dimensions of capitalism, emphasising how economic processes shape and are shaped by the spatial organisation of society. This includes exploring concepts like uneven development of capitalism, the concentration of capital in urban centres, and the spatial segregation of social classes.

Critical space theory and feminist geography - Critical theorists such as Henri Lefebvre have looked to understand how power relations are inscribed in space, and how spatial arrangements can produce, reproduce and challenge social inequalities. Feminist geography has critiqued and extended traditional approaches to space and place, highlighting the gendered and intersectional dimensions of spatial organisation and inequalities.

Environmental justice - Environmental justice movements have highlighted the intersection of spatial injustice and environmental degradation, by drawing attention to the spatial distribution of environmental hazards and unequal exposure of marginalised communities to environmental risk.

=== Key debates within spatial politics ===
Within spatial politics, several debates shape academic inquiry and public discourse. These include:

Right to the city - The right to the city is a concept originating in urban studies, and is particularly associated with philosopher and sociologist Henri Lefebvre. It is argued that urban space should be shaped and governed by the citizens that live in it, rather than solely be controlled by market forces such as capitalism and commodification.

In the context of spatial politics, the concept brings into discussion debates about equitable access to essential resources, urban governance, participatory planning, gentrification and spatial justice. It draws attention to the debate of who has the right to produce space, and spatial production practices in private, public and common spaces.

Spatial inequality and justice - Spatial inequality refers to social, economic and environmental inequalities that create disparities in access to resources, opportunities, and services across different spatial areas and scales. Spatial justice refers to addressing spatial inequalities and the fair and equitable distribution of resources, opportunities, and environmental benefits across different spatial areas and scales.

In the context of spatial politics, these debates centre on the unequal distribution of resources, infrastructure, opportunities and environmental risks, across spatial areas and scales. Spatial inequalities emphasise the importance of recognising the spatial dimensions of different inequalities, while spatial justice is a concept to guide efforts to address these inequalities.

The city as a growth machine - The concept of the city as a growth machine originated from urban sociologist Harvey Molotch. The analogy explores the idea of powerful interest groups driving economic growth in urban areas and consequently shaping urban policies and governance.

In the context of spatial politics, this concept draws attention to the need to study political influence including organisation, lobbying and structuring carried out by power interest groups when understanding spatial production. It also invites debate about the role of growth in urban processes. In response to the city as a growth machine, a degrowth spatial politics agenda has emerged.

Urbanisation - Cities or features of cities are increasingly positioned as the epicentre of prosperity and the solution for sustainability. For example, urban sprawl is seen as unsustainable, while denser and more compact cities are seen as sustainable. This creates a divide or a dichotomy with the role of rural areas. However, the concept of planetary urbanisation suggests that rural areas are also mobilised in the pursuit of economic growth, as they undergo changes that serve the city.

Urbanisation is a key debate within spatial politics due to its impact on social, economic, and environmental dynamics within urban spaces. Within this key debate are important discussions including gentrification and displacement, the role of technology, economic development, democracy and governance, and sustainability.

== Spatial analysis ==
=== Space ===
Space refers to the physical dimensions, the state of ownership, the juridical understanding, the spatial, economic, and social relations of a place, and about the possibility and dynamics of the production of that place. Space is about spatial practices, such as the home and property.

In her famous work ‘For Space’: Doreen Massey defines space by three propositions:

- Space as the product of interrelations - Massey poses space as constituted through our interactions, ‘from the immensity of the global to the intimately tiny.’
- Space as the sphere of possibility - If space is the product of interrelations, then it must be predicated upon the existence of plurality, where different trajectories exist. She poses multiplicity and space as co-constitutive.
- Space as a process - Space is always under construction because space is a product of relations-between, relations which have to be carried out, and therefore always are in the process of being made. It is never finished. Massey proposes we could imagine space as a simultaneity of stories-so-far.

In "The Production of Space." Henri Lefebvre views space as a dynamic and socially constructed phenomenon. Space is produced by societies and is deeply influenced by social relations. He gives three dimensions of space:

- Spatial Practice (Perceived Space) - This refers to the physical and material dimensions of space that people experience in their daily lives. It encompasses the routines, activities, and interactions that occur in physical settings.
- Representations of Space (Conceived Space) - This dimension involves the mental and conceptual representations of space, often created by planners, architects, and scientists. It includes maps, plans, and designs that reflect the formal and organized ways societies envision and structure space.
- Spaces of Representation (Lived Space) - This is the space of symbolism, meaning, and lived experience. It includes the ways in which individuals and groups perceive and inhabit spaces, imbuing them with personal and cultural significance. Lived space is where imagination, memories, and emotions play a crucial role.

=== Place ===
Place refers to the actual locus, to the history and memory, and the spatial, cultural, historical relations of this locus. It involves locations that are imbued with personal, cultural, or communal significance, that highlight its identity and the social values we attribute to it. Place is a portion of space, seen as the outcome of the production of space through spatial politics. Places have meaning and are shaped by human experiences and interactions (Duarte, 2017).

=== Territory ===
Territory refers to the imposed qualities on a space. Territory is a concept associated with control, power, and political boundaries. It involves spaces that are claimed, governed, and regulated by individuals, groups, or institutions. An important characteristic of territory, therefore, is that it is constituted provided there is a system of values shared by those occupying that portion of space. The most institutionalised form of territory lies in the idea of the state. Territory, particularly in the modern world, is a conceptual device and an instrument designed for managing a portion of space, and the objects, people, and actions within it. Territory tends to have boundaries, which are governed internally and externally. (Duarte, 2017).

=== Maps ===
Space is reduced in various ways by creating maps. The representation of any object or phenomenon necessarily involves deciding which features to select and which features to leave out. Maps create new spatial understandings of the world, and also serve as social and political tools, such as the navigational maps used during the golden age of European navigation. (Duarte, 2017) Within spatial politics, a key understanding is that there is no right representation of space in maps. The decision of how you portray a certain space is always political.

== Urban analysis ==
=== Touristification ===
Touristification refers to the process in which urban residential spaces are transformed to serve the needs of tourists and the mass-tourism sector. This transformation usually alters the social, spatial, cultural, and economic landscape of the area, which has led many to criticise the impacts of mass-tourism. Indeed, studies have shown that touristification can, among other things, cause prices on essentials such as housing and food to rise; erase the cultural heritage and traditions of the local area; harm the local environment due to high levels of wasted created.

This phenomenon has garnered increasing academic and political attention as it has become a major global industry, surpassing the automobile, oil export, and food products industries. Within this industry, urban tourism is by far the fastest growing sector. This reflects the reality that, according to UN findings, “54% of the world's population lived in urban areas and, by 2030, this share is expected to reach 60%”. As such, many post-industrial cities, especially in Europe, have pivoted to focus on tourism as the main strategy for stimulating economic growth.

Urban transformation has largely taken place in the historical centres of these cities, which were “(re)developed” in order to attract and manage more tourists. The effects of such redevelopment have been contradictory, as despite being extremely lucrative spaces for a city, touristified historical centres lose some of their history and cultural heritage, which lessens their appeal to tourists.

There have been debates around whether touristification is a form of gentrification or a unique phenomenon. Some point to the fact that touristification, like gentrification results in the expulsion of locals to make space for an affluent population. On the other hand, others have stated that tourists do not settle down in the area they visit, making touristification a distinct process from gentrification.

=== Rural-urban divide ===
Spatial politics calls for a new analysis of how space is produced, particularly in studying the urban and the rural. In the traditional view, informed by an analysis of 19th century metropolises, space is split in two between the urban centre and rural periphery. The two spaces are clearly delineated, with rural spaces supplying urban poles with resources.

Spatial politics analysis, however, says that current space production has blurred the lines between the urban and the rural. The urban, according to spatial politics, should be analysed as a process, not a fixed thing in itself. Indeed, this analysis speaks of extended urbanisation, which refers to the transformation of rural and peri-urban spaces to integrate them into broad urban networks. For example, according to spatial politics, “rural” spaces used solely for agricultural products sent to a city are part of the urban network of the city.

Furthermore, spatial politics analysis points to the fact that urbanisation is no longer limited to specific, recognisable urban centres. Instead, it extends across entire regions and even globally, influencing and transforming rural, suburban, and peri-urban areas. Cities are also increasingly interconnected through global networks of economic, social, and cultural flows. This interconnectedness means that urbanisation processes in one part of the world can have significant impacts on urban areas elsewhere.

=== Real subsumption of nature ===
The real subsumption of nature refers to the process by which capitalism extends its control over nature, transforming natural resources and processes into commodities for capitalist production and accumulation. The idea draws an analogy with the real subsumption of labour, originally outlined in Karl Marx's Capital: A critique of political economy. This real subsumption of nature is a foundational concept for understanding common debates within spatial politics such as urbanisation processes, the rural-urban relationship and spatial inequalities.
