= Tatjana Schneider =

Architect and academic

Tatjana Schneider is an architect and academic. She is currently head of the Institute for History and Theory of Architecture and the City (GTAS) at the Technical University Braunschweig in Germany. Before this, she was a Senior Lecturer in the School of Architecture, University of Sheffield, England and, in 2014/15, Professor for History and Theory of the City at HafenCity University Hamburg, Germany. She has a Ph.D. from the University of Strathclyde (2006), her thesis title being "Mechanisms of the themed environment".

The British Council's "Creative Economy" website states that:

Her work addresses the mechanisms behind the production of space with particular focus on spatial praxis. This focus is manifested through visual and word-based critiques against normative intellectual and pedagogical tendencies and through direct spatial interventions, which sometimes take activist dimensions.

Schneider was a founder member of the architectural co-operative Glasgow Letters on Architecture and Space (GLAS, 2000-2007), and also the Sheffield-based AGENCY – Transformative Research into Architectural Practice and Education in 2007 and the Radical Architectures Network in 2013.

== Selected publications ==
- Schneider, Tatjana; Till, Jeremy (2007). Flexible Housing. Elsevier/Architectural. ISBN 9780750682022.
- Awan, Nishat; Schneider, Tatjana; Till, Jeremy (2011). Spatial agency : other ways of doing architecture. Routledge. ISBN 9780415571920.
- Florian Kossak, Doina Petrescu, Tatjana Schneider, Renata Tyszczuk, Stephen Walker (editors) (2009). Agency: Working With Uncertain Architectures. Routledge. ISBN 9781135281908
- Schneider, Tatjana (2008). This building should have some sort of distinctive shape : the story of the Arts Tower in Sheffield. PAR - Praxis for Architectural Research. ISBN 9780955666902.
