= Jeremy Till =

British architect, educator and writer (born 1957)

Professor Jeremy Till (born 5 April 1957) is a British architect, educator and writer. He is an Emeritus Professor of Architecture at Central Saint Martins, University of the Arts London. He was Head of Central Saint Martins and Pro Vice-Chancellor of the University of the Arts London from 2012 to 2022.

== Education ==
Till was educated at Eton College (1970–75), Cambridge University (MA, 1979), Polytechnic of Central London (Dip Arch 1983) and Middlesex University (MA Modern European Philosophy, 1999).

== Architectural Career ==
Till worked for relatively low-key architectural practices, Alex Gordon Partnership and Peter Currie Architects, before joining his partner, Sarah Wigglesworth, to design and build their well-known house and office, 9 Stock Orchard Street, which was featured on the first series of the TV Programme Grand Designs; subsequently the presenter Kevin McCloud named the project as one of his favourite projects. The building, made from straw bales and other unconventional materials, was awarded Civic Trust Award (2002), RIBA National Award (2004) and RIBA Sustainability Prize (2004). It has been published extensively worldwide, with the journal World Architecture saying: "It is destined to become an icon, the subject of dissertations and copycat projects. Unlike the established canon of exemplary houses, this house/office is a deep, dense and determined essay on the question: what is architecture today?" He left Sarah Wigglesworth Architects in 2002 to concentrate on an academic career. Till curated the British Pavilion at the 2006 Venice Architecture Biennale. The exhibition, entitled Echo City received very mixed reviews, with severe criticism from the London architectural press, but praise from international reviewers. He chaired the RIBA Awards Panel from 2004 to 2006, the only academic to have held this position. In 2013 he co-curated the UK Pavilion at the Shenzhen Biennale with a team from Central Saint Martins, for which they were awarded the Biennale's Academic Committee Prize.

== Academic career ==
Till started his teaching career at what was then Kingston Polytechnic in 1986. He moved to the Bartlett School of Architecture, University College London in 1990, soon after the appointment of Peter Cook as the School's Head. While at the Bartlett, Till was undergraduate course director, Diploma studio teacher and sub-Dean of the Faculty. In 1999, he was appointed as Head of the School of Architecture and Professor of Architecture at the University of Sheffield. Under his direction, the School gained a reputation for the social and political basis of its teaching and research. In 2008 he was appointed Dean of Architecture and the Built Environment at the University of Westminster. He was appointed as Head of Central Saint Martins and Pro Vice-Chancellor of the University of the Arts London in 2012, and held that position until September 2022. He was appointed the University Lead on Climate Emergency in 2018. An interview with Till about his time as Head of Central Saint Martins was published on the UAL Oral History archive. He is now an Emeritus Professor of Architecture at the University of the Arts London. He has sat on a range of national committees including as a panel member for the 2008 Research Assessment Exercise and the 2014 Research Excellence Framework. He was a member of the RIBA Education and Research Committees in the 2000s.

== Research and writing ==
Till's research and writing has concentrated on the social and political aspects of architecture and the built environment. Stephen Moss writes in the Guardian that, "the appeal of Till's thinking is that he starts with people rather than structures, and asks us not to venerate buildings but to occupy them." His best known book is Architecture Depends, which was widely reviewed, and praised by the Times Higher as "a brave, enjoyable, affirming and important book." Other books include Flexible Housing (written with Tatjana Schneider) and Spatial Agency (written with Nishat Awan and Tatjana Schneider) All three of these books were awarded the RIBA President's Award for Outstanding University-based research, making Till the only person to have received this international honour three times. In addition to these books, Till has written numerous articles, which are collected together on his own website. From 2010 to 2013 he ran a large research project on issues of scarcity and creativity in the built environment, funded by HERA (Humanities in the European Research Area). From 2021 he led, again with Tatjana Schneider, a research project funded by AHRC and DFG entitled 'Architecture after Architecture: spatial practice in the face of the climate emergency. For this project, he is part of the research collective MOULD Their book Architecture is Climate and website come out of this project and have been positively reviewed.

== Politics ==
It has been commented that his privileged Eton and Cambridge background is at odds with his later left-wing political views. In 2025, Till was arrested as part of the Defend Our Juries' protest against the proscription of Palestine Action. From 2024, Till started to express his views on Substack, including trenchant critiques of environmental issues and ethics in architectural practice.

== Personal life ==
Till is the son of the educator and former cleric Barry Till and the long-term partner of the architect Sarah Wigglesworth, a pair called by the Evening Standard "a glamorous power couple." His interests are listed in Who's Who as 'growing, cooking and eating food'. He lives in London. He served as a trustee of the New Economics Foundation from 2015 to 2021 and Chair of the Steering Group of Architects Climate Action Network from 2024-26.
