= Jason-Antigone Dane =

Greek activist (born 1985)

Jason-Antigone Dane (Dhousis) (Greek: Ιάσων-Αντιγόνη Δούσης) is a Greek LGBT rights activist.

== Early years ==
Dane was born in Athens, Greece on 13 August 1985 and raised in the neighborhood of Kolonaki. Dane graduated from Athens College, then joined the 2nd experimental Lyceum of Athens, and went on to graduate from the Department of Theatre Studies at the University of Patras with honours. Dane continued studies in theatre, joining the drama school of Roula Pateraki, graduating with honours, and later moved to London, working in famous gay clubs and becoming more interested and active in human and animal rights and veganism. Later, Dane returned to Greece to study human rights at the University of Athens.

== Activism ==
=== Nude activism ===
After returning to Greece, Dane created tension in the gay community with naked protests that included slogans written on their naked body. Dane changed names by adding the name Antigone (from the mythic heroine) next to the baptismal first name Jason.

=== ID trail ===
In November 2017, Dane took legal steps to ask to legally be referred as gender neutral, with gender erased from Dane's ID. That came one month after a bill was passed from the Parliament to allow people to change the gender on their identity cards. However, Dane wanted gender to be erased entirely. Dane, who is genderqueer, was the first person to ask for official recognition as a non-binary person. During the hearing, Dane was accompanied by Grigoris Valianatos.

In February 2018, the court ruled in favour of allowing Dane to identify as a non-binary person on identity cards, but not to totally erase gender from the cards.

=== Bill on LGBT adoption ===
Dane was under the spotlight of mass media when attending the House of the Hellenic Parliament for LGBT adoption on May 9, 2018. During the hearing, MP Kostas Katsikis stated that homosexuality was a crime equal to pedophilia. Dane left the house as a sign of disapproval.

=== Politics ===
Dane was a candidate councillor in Athens in the 2019 Greek local elections. They ran with Rena Dourou, who was affiliated with the Coalition of the Radical Left (Syriza).

Dane has stated that they are an admirer of Alexis Tsipras.
