= Public Architecture =

Public Architecture is a national 501(c)(3) charitable organization based in San Francisco, CA. The organization mobilizes designers to transform communities by putting design in the service of the public good The organization is the leading advocate and facilitator of pro bono practice in the design field through The 1% program. Public Architecture also takes on its own projects that expand the social relevance of design, including a prototypical station for day laborers, open space strategies, and advocacy around the issue of material reuse. The organization has partnered with and worked for a number of renowned nonprofits, including KIPP Schools, International Planned Parenthood, United Way and Habitat for Humanity. The organization's work has been featured in the New York Times, the Boston Globe, the Huffington Post, GOOD, Dwell, Architect, Metropolis, and many others. Public Architecture was founded in 2002 by architect John Peterson of Peterson Architects.

== The 1% program of Public Architecture ==
The 1% program is a call to action for professionals of the built environment to pledge a minimum of 1% of their time to pro bono service. Through The 1% website, firms can identity and locate nonprofits across the country in need of design services. Conversely, nonprofits enrolled in the program can find designers in their area willing to give of their time. As the program grows, it aims to connect design firms, nonprofits, manufacturers, and funders to collaborate and improve the infrastructure of America's nonprofits. In March 2011, the program had over 900 participating firms, donating $28million in design services annually. The firms range from sole practitioners to some of the largest firms in the country, including Gensler, HoK, and Perkins+Will.

In October 2010, Public Architecture released The Power of Pro Bono: 40 Stories of Design for the Public Good by Architects and Their Clients through Metropolis Books. Edited by longtime, former executive director, John Cary and Public Architecture, the book presents 40 pro bono design projects across the country. The clients include grassroots community organizations like the Homeless Prenatal Program of San Francisco, as well as national and international nonprofits, among them Goodwill, Habitat for Humanity, and KIPP Schools. These public-interest projects were designed by a range of award-winning practices, from SHoP Architects in New York and Studio Gang in Chicago, to young studios including Stephen Dalton Architects in Southern California and Hathorne Architects in Detroit, to some of the nation's largest firms. Scores of private donors, local community foundations and companies, and material and service donations made these projects possible. So have some of the most progressive funders in the country, ranging from Brad Pitt's Make It Right Foundation in New Orleans to the Robin Hood Foundation in New York. Taken as a whole, the selected works represent six general categories: Arts, Civic, Community, Education, Health and Housing.

== Advocacy & Design Demonstration Projects ==
=== Day Labor Station ===
The Day Labor Station is a prototypical structure, which will be used to house day laborers as they wait for employers to provide them with temporary work. The Station is a flexible structure that is designed to be deployed at informal day labor locations. The structure utilizes green building materials and strategies and will exist primarily off-the-grid. The design is based on findings from a series of interviews with day laborers conducted by Public Architecture, and is meant to respond to the needs and desires of the day laborers as clients. The structure is designed to be flexible enough to serve various uses, including as an employment center, meeting space, and classroom, and become a prototype for similar conditions (i.e. 1-1 Day Labor Station-installation at AAO Benaki Museum curated by Lina Stergiou). A portion of the first prototype of the Day Labor Station is on display at the “Design for the Other 90%” exhibition at the Cooper-Hewitt, National Design Museum in New York from May 4 through September 23, 2007.

=== Sidewalk Plazas ===
The Sidewalk Plazas project is Public Architecture's proposal to create parking-space sized open spaces, increasing the amount of open and green space in San Francisco's former-light-industrial-turned-mixed-use South of Market Area and related urban areas across the country. This plan has earned support from the San Francisco Planning Department, Redevelopment Agency, and Transportation Authority, and funds are being sought to implement a series of Sidewalk Plazas along Folsom Street in SoMa.

=== ScrapHouse ===
ScrapHouse was temporary demonstration house, constructed and displayed in front of San Francisco City Hall as a part of World Environment Day in 2005. It was constructed completely from salvage materials donated by local businesses, and was built in six weeks by a volunteer work-force. Emmy Award-winning documentarian Anna Fitch conceived of the project, and filmed the entire process for a documentary film that aired on the National Geographic Channel in September 2006.
