= Gazi, Athens =

Gazi Γκάζι
- Neighborhood
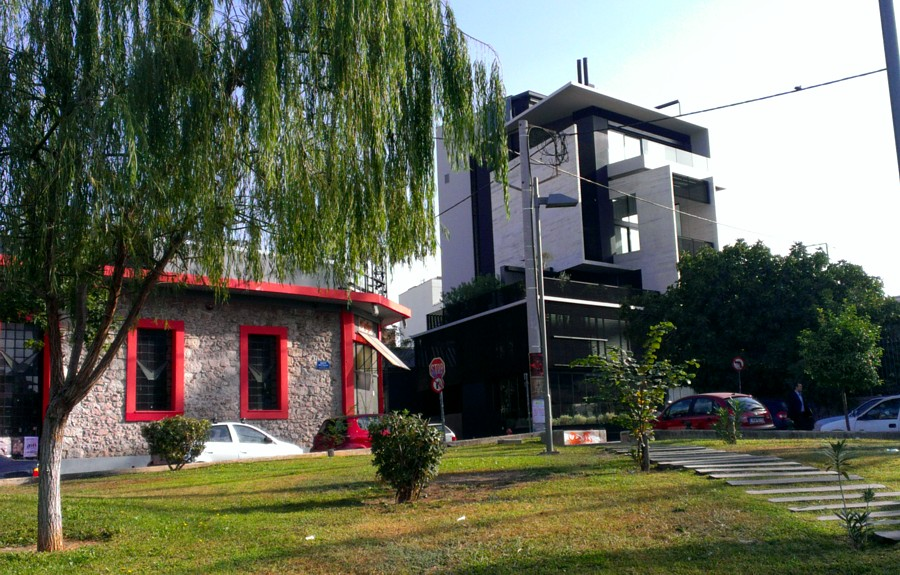
- Gazi neighborhood's architecture

- Location in Athens
- Coordinates: 37°58′41″N 23°42′52″E
- Country: Greece
- Region: Attica
- City: Athens
- Postal code: 118 54
- Area code: 210

Gazi (Greek: Γκάζι, pronounced [ˈga.zi]; formerly Γκαζοχώρι Gazochori or Φωταέριο Fotaerio) is a neighborhood of Athens, Greece. It surrounds the old Athens gasworks, which is the industrial museum and exhibition space "Technopolis", widely known as Gazi, next to Keramikos and close to the Acropolis.

== History ==
The old gasworks was founded in 1857. Around 1910, several brothels were set up in the area, a fact which led to brothels in general being referred to as 'Gazi'.

During the mid-20th century, small dwellings with few rooms and large gardens began to spring up around the gasworks. These were generally home to large, poor families from Athens. Gazi was a deprived area but despite this, there was no associated high crime rate. The area was mainly inhabited by crate makers.

In 1967, due to difficult socio-economic conditions in northern Greece, many Muslim families established a presence in the area, working at the gasworks.

Over the years, numerous garages, paint shops, tinsmiths and spare parts shops opened up in the area.

=== Climate ===
In Gazi, one of main weather stations of the National Observatory of Athens is hosted. The area has a Mediterranean climate. Annual precipitation averages 460mm. August has been a very hot and dry month in the last decade. December averages around 80mm. Winter is a cool and wet period, while summer is a very hot and dry season.

Climate data for Athens Gazi
Month	Jan	Feb	Mar	Apr	May	Jun	Jul	Aug	Sep	Oct	Nov	Dec	Year
Mean daily maximum °C (°F)	13.3 (55.9)	14.3 (57.7)	16.7 (62.1)	21 (70)	26.5 (79.7)	31.5 (88.7)	34.3 (93.7)	34.3 (93.7)	29.5 (85.1)	24.3 (75.7)	18.9 (66.0)	14.4 (57.9)	23.2 (73.9)
Mean daily minimum °C (°F)	7.0 (44.6)	7.3 (45.1)	9.0 (48.2)	12.2 (54.0)	17.0 (62.6)	21.6 (70.9)	24.2 (75.6)	24.4 (75.9)	20.4 (68.7)	16.1 (61.0)	12.2 (54.0)	8.7 (47.7)	15.0 (59.0)
Average precipitation mm (inches)	63.3 (2.49)	61.8 (2.43)	44.0 (1.73)	25.8 (1.02)	24.2 (0.95)	22.6 (0.89)	8.4 (0.33)	2.7 (0.11)	23.8 (0.94)	40.6 (1.60)	62.9 (2.48)	79.5 (3.13)	459.6 (18.1)
Source: (2009-2021)

== Modern era ==
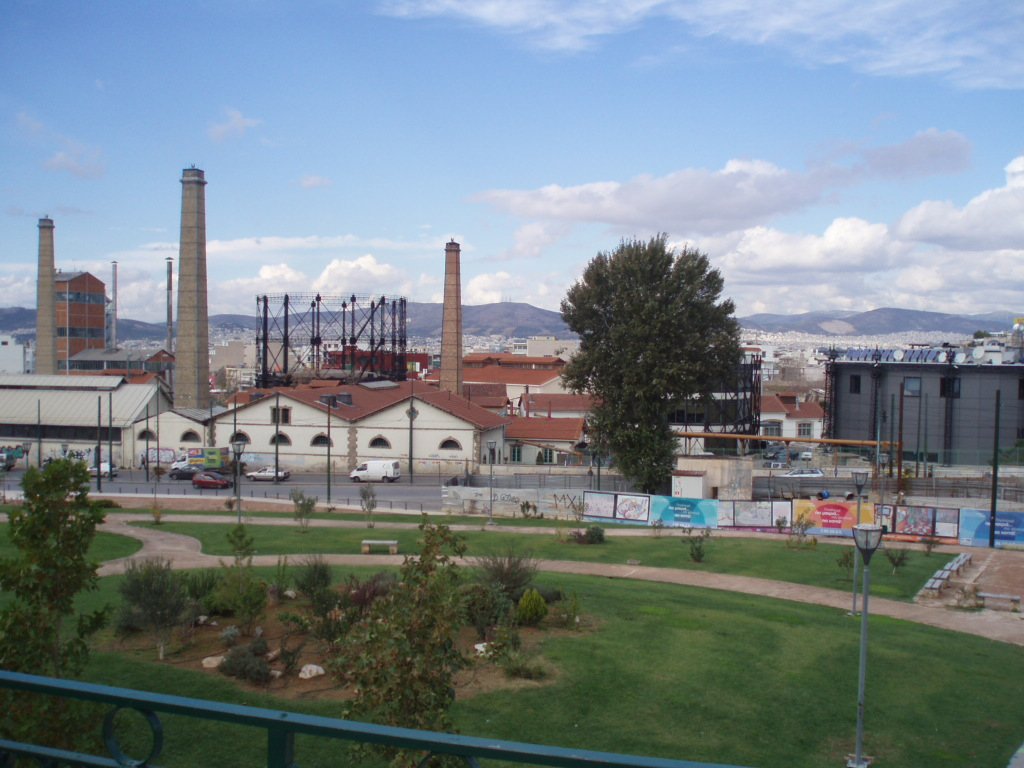
The Technopolis, Gazi.

To this day, there is a heavy Muslim presence in the area. A 'multicultural' school exists in the area, the 87th Elementary School of Athens, with a student body comprising 70% Muslim, 20% Greek Orthodox and 10% Albanian and Romanians.

Gazi is home to the Technopolis of Athens, that spreads in an area of about 30,000 m2, an industrial museum of modern architecture which today operates as a multipurpose cultural center.

In July 1986 the ministry of culture and Sports, Melina Merkouri, characterized the factory building as listed building and a year later on September 30, 1987, it turned into a focal point in the cultural identity of Athens with the contribution of the Municipality of Athens.

Since the start of the 21st century, Gazi has experienced urban refinement and features active nightlife and night clubs, cafeterias, restaurants, gay and lesbian bars and several gay-friendly shops, establishing itself as an entertainment district. A branch of the Benaki Museum has also been installed in the area.

Gazi has been connected with Thissio through the footpaths of Ermou, the construction of parks and free spaces, while the station of Kerameikos metro station was the station of its development.

Kerameikos metro station on Line 3 of the Athens Metro is adjacent to the Technopolis of Gazi.
