= Sarah Wigglesworth =

British architect and academic

Sarah Wigglesworth MBE RDI
- Born: 1957 (age 68–69); London, UK
- Education: University of Cambridge
- Occupation: Architect
- Partner: Jeremy Till
- Awards: Fulbright Arts Fellowship, Royal Designer for Industry
- Practice: Sarah Wigglesworth Architects (1994–2024)
- Buildings: Strawbale House, Highbury Roundhouse, Cremorne Rierside Centre, Sandal Magna Primary School
- Website: swarch.co.uk

Sarah Wigglesworth (born 16 May 1957, London) is a British architect. She was also a professor of architecture at the University of Sheffield until 2016.

== Career ==
Wigglesworth founded her own architectural practice in 1994. Her practice has a reputation for sustainable architecture using alternative, low energy materials. The practice designed the Straw Bale House in Islington, London, as a home for Wigglesworth and her partner, Jeremy Till, as well as an office for Sarah Wigglesworth Architects. Constructed of straw bales, cement-filled sandbags, silicon-faced fibreglass cloth and gabions filled with recycled concrete, she described it as not "like a traditional green building." Her stated aim was "to bring green architecture into the mainstream by making it more urban and urbane." The house featured in the first series of Grand Designs (1999) and Lina Stergiou's AAO exhibition at the Benaki Museum.

She was Professor of Architecture at the University of Sheffield from 1999 to 2016 where she founded the PhD BY Design in 2002. Her academic work often blended with her 'live' projects and she describes her research focus as "revealing the workings of practice." She led the Designing for Wellbeing in Environments for Later Life research project at the University of Sheffield, looking into the design of houses and neighbourhoods for older people.

In 1991, Wigglesworth and Till were the first architects to be awarded the Fulbright Arts Fellowship. Wigglesworth was appointed MBE in 2004 and in 2012 became the first woman to receive the Royal Designer for Industry award for architecture.

Alongside the Straw Bale House, Wigglesworth's Sandal Magna School has been described as an exemplar of passive, sustainable design. Wigglesworth also places an emphasis on user involvement in the design of buildings. Her Mellor Primary School incorporates spaces for natural habitats and is designed to aid the school's curriculum and help pupils interact with the building.

Sarah Wigglesworth is an advocate for the role of women in architecture. In 1995, she initiated of Desiring Practices: Architecture, Gender and the Interdisciplinary, an exhibition, symposium, catalogue and book that explored gender differences in architectural practice. She has criticised the architectural profession for failing properly to support female architecture students and practitioners.

== Notable works ==
- Straw Bale House and office, London (2001) – RIBA Award and RIBA Sustainability Prize
- Classroom of the Future, Sheffield (2005) – RIBA Award
- Siobhan Davies Dance Studios, London (2006) – RIBA Award
- Cremorne Riverside Centre, London (2008) – RIBA Award
- Heathfield Children's Centre, London (2008)
- Sandal Magna Community Primary School, Wakefield (2010) – RIBA Award
- Mellor Primary School, Stockport (2015) – RIBA Award
- Deborah House Artist Studios (2015)

== Personal life ==
Wigglesworth grew up in north London, attending Camden School for Girls. She studied architecture at the University of Cambridge from 1976 to 1983, graduating with distinction.

Her long-term partner, Jeremy Till, is Head of Central Saint Martins and Pro Vice Chancellor of the University of the Arts London.
