= Hellenic Cosmos =

- Ελληνικός Κόσμος
- Established: 1998
- Location: Athens
- Type: Cultural Centre and Museum
- Website: http://www.hellenic-cosmos.gr/

Hellenic Cosmos (Ελληνικός Κόσμος) is a modern Cultural Centre and Museum in Athens, Greece which attempts to unravel the complex issues of Hellenism.

Many current cultural events take place in the centre, including the annual Plisskën music festival.
