= Athens Digital Arts Festival =

Annual international festival held in Athens, Greece

ADAF logo

Athens Digital Arts Festival (ADAF) (Greek: Διεθνές Φεστιβάλ Ψηφιακών Τεχνών της Ελλάδας) is an international festival that takes place every May in Athens, Greece.

The festival was established in 2005 under the title Athens Video Art Festival by the non-profit organization Multitrab Productions to create a platform for video art, installations and live performances. Since then, it has added interactive installations, web art, workshops, animation and digital images. In January 2015, the festival changed its name to the current one.

== History ==
The Athens Video Art Festival was founded in 2005 with the intention to "offer a platform for video art, installations and live performances". Over the next 10 years, the festival began to include more types of art, such as web art, interactive installations, animation, digital art, applications and workshops, while exploring the creative aspects of technology and digital culture. In 2012, the Festival introduced the subtitle "International Festival of Digital Arts & New Media", and in January 2015 it was renamed Athens Digital Arts Festival. In 2016, the category ADAF Kids was launched as a program for both kids and their parents.

ADAF has maintained active partnerships with 46 collaborating festivals. The festival is also a partner of AVnode, an "international network of artists and professionals organizing festivals and/or working in the fields of audiovisual live performances".

== Past festivals ==
=== 2005-2019 ===
2005

The first edition of the Athens Video Art Festival took place in April 2005 at the cultural multi-space Thira Texnis. Apart from video art and installations, the festival presented an exhibition of digital images and constructions.

2006

The second edition of the festival took place in April 2006 at the cultural multi-space theater Aggelon Vima. This year, the festival presented numerous additional festivals from abroad, including Transmediale from Germany, Vaia from Spain, Electronic Language International Festival from Brazil, Loop from Spain and Con Can from Japan.

2007

The third edition of the festival took place in April 2007 at the Technopolis of Athens. Apart from the categories of Video Art, Video Installations, Installation Art and Performance Art, the festival presented even more festivals from abroad.

2008

The fourth edition of the festival took place in April 2008 at the Technopolis of Athens. More than 1,350 artists from Greece and abroad submitted their artworks, and more than 12,000 visitors attended. Apart from the works submitted for this festival in the categories of video art, video installations, installation art and performance art, this festival presented the works of some international festivals as well.

2009

The fifth edition of the festival took place in April 2009 at the Technopolis of Athens. More than 1,400 artists from Greece and abroad submitted their artworks, and more than 14,000 visitors attended. Athens Video Art Festival celebrated its 5th edition by inviting in exclusive Greek guests and representatives of Greek academic institutions that presented on the modern history of video art and new media. This edition of the festival was notable for its tribute to Nam June Paik, a Korean artist who is considered the "founder of video art" and who died in 2006.

2010

The sixth edition of the festival took place in May 2010 at the Technopolis of Athens and the Greek Film Museum. More than 2,700 artists from Greece and abroad submitted their artworks and more than 13,000 visitors attended.

2011

The seventh edition of the festival took place in May 2011 at the Technopolis of Athens.

2012

The eighth edition of the festival took place in May 2012 at the Technopolis of Athens. More than 340 artworks from 58 different countries were shown and more than 15,000 visitors attended. By following a route from the Kourtaki Arcade (Kolokotroni 57) to the Aghia Eirini square, visitors had the opportunity to visit "Booze Cooperativa", a block of flats on Kolokotroni Street, whose basements held an exhibit on modern culture.

2013

The ninth edition of the festival took place in June 2013 under the title "Living Athens". More than 18,000 visitors attended the festival which was held in cooperation with multiple venues, including CAMP!, Estia Emporon of Samourka Foundation, Booze Cooperativa and Bios.

2014

The tenth edition of the festival took place in October 2024 at the Technopolis of Athens. 350 artists from 58 different countries were exhibited.

2015

The eleventh edition of the festival took place in May 2015 in collaboration with the E.B.E - Diplareios Sxoli as well as other parallel venues of the historical center of Athens including the Squares of Monastiraki, Aghia Irini and the Theater Square. The theme of the Festival revolved around the notion of "public space" and its different ways of interpretation. Places like Squares, parks, streets and the Internet are all potential public spaces that are activated through participation and engagement in order to acquire meaning.

2016

During 19 to 22 May 2016 the Festival celebrated its 12th edition with a theme devoted to "Pop- culture" and the use of the internet that creates a kind of ephemeral culture that is constantly undergoing changes. The main venue where it took place was the Building Complex Gate Ermou 117 – 121 as well as the collaborating Parallel Venue of six d.o.g.s. It presented works from 450 artists from all over the world, and was attended by more than 10.000 people.

2017

The 13th edition of Athens Digital Arts Festiva with the title "#PostFuture" revolved around the notion of what follows up after the digital revolution is over, based on the late Negroponte's prediction. As the modern age seems to have purely incorporated the merge of "digital" and "reality" this edition explored the ways that technological advancements influence art and the everyday life. It was held on 18 – 21 May on its main Venue Mitropoleos 23 in the Historic Center of Athens as well as other parallel venues like the Athens International Airport, "Eleftherios Venizelos", Syntagma Square, Monastiraki Square and Kolokotroni 61. The 13th edition of the Festival hosted works by 250 artists and was attended by more than 17.000 people.

2018

The 14th Athens Digital Arts Festival explored the unknown future of the upcoming Technological Apocalypse through art, science and technology under the theme "SINGULARITY NOW". Singularity can be interpreted under different concepts. In technology, it is a scenario where artificial intelligence surpasses humanity, the technological boom becomes infinite and the outcome is unpredictable. Therefore, the 14th edition presented works and achievements which outline, comment, foresee, or determine the upcoming singularity, the human as well as the technological role in this new era. It was held May 24–27, 2018 in the Megaron/ Athens Concert Hall and presented works by 350 artists while it was visited by more than 20.000 people.

2019

This year ADAF is celebrating its 15th anniversary from 9–12 May. Under the theme "The World is a Hologram", revolves around the holographic theory, taking a closer look at the notions of inter-connectivity and an alternative perception of the 3- dimensional perception of the world we live in. The 15th edition will be even more interactive as two new categories have been added to the program, those of Games and Virtual Reality. As for now, there have been more than 3.500 submissions by artists from all over the world.

== Parallel projects ==
=== ADAF | Athens International Airport "Eleftherios Venizelos" ===
Continuing its cooperation with the Athens International Airport "Eleftherios Venizelos", since 5 March 2019, ADAF presents a series of "contemporary digital art installations" along the corridor Underground Link, which connects the Main Terminal Building with the Satellite Building.

=== LPM 2015 > 2018 ===
AVnode | LPM 2015 > 2018 is a Large Scale Cooperation Project co-funded by the Creative Europe Culture Programme of the European Union which aim is to promote and develop live video culture to both European and worldwide audiences. LPM 2015 > 2018 project foresees the production of 36 festivals, 3 Meetings, 3 Audience Development Conferences and 200 satellite events in 3 years.

=== SNF RUN: 2019 First Run | Finish Line Digital Canvas ===
Εspecially for the "SNF RUN 2019 FIRST RUN" 4k race organized by the Stavros Niarchos Foundation and took place a few minutes after we welcomed the New Year of 2019, Athens Digital Arts Festival (ADAF) created a unique interactive and participatory installation under the name "Finish Line Digital Canvas", in which runners were displayed as they cross the finish line in real time, forming a mosaic of human bodies that was imprinted on a digital canvas which united individual efforts into a collective body.

=== Christmas Lights at Stavros Niarchos Park ===
During the Christmas period of 2018, Athens Digital Arts Festival (ADAF), undertook the art direction and curated the luminous interactive installations at Stavros Niarchos Park, which were designed so visitors could walk past or through the "light frames", immersing themselves in a unique holiday festival of lights.

=== ADAF AR ===
On 26 November 2018, ADAF launched its new "Augmented Reality application", which gave life to artworks, murals, posters, flyers, vinyls, books and much more. The app is available for free on Google Play and Apple Store.

=== Six Augmented Murals Unveiled During European Heritage Days 2018 in Greece ===
Mid-November 2018 saw the completion of a magnificent European Heritage Days project by the Directorate of Archeological Museums, Exhibitions and Educational Programs of the Hellenic Ministry of Culture and Sports. A series of "augmented murals" were unveiled on the streets of Athens, Thessaloniki, and Ioannina, opening the dialogue between cultural heritage and urban life.

=== The 8 th Day | Human Created Machine ===
With the aim to explore both Utopian and Dystopian views on the future of art, technology and science, "Multitrab Productions", in the framework of the 14th Athens Digital Arts Festival, organised a two-day event with screenings with free entrance on 1 and 2 February 2018. The program of the film tribute included premieres of renown films, documentaries and video art.

=== REC: Interactive Installation // #PostFuture Mural ===
REC: Interactive Installation // #PostFuture Mural was an interactive installation by REC of Elektro Moon group which revolved around the modern issue of "surveillance" and "data mining". The same event also hosted the mural #PostFuture of the visual artist Nikolaos A. Tsounakas, which was a realistic incarnation of the digital-physical contradiction inspired by ADAF's 2017 theme #PostFuture.

=== #PostFuture Dialogues | Greece – China Year ===
Aiming to create a "cultural dialogue" between Greece and China, ADAF held an event in 2017 which focused on how Greece and Chinese artists experience the transcendence of the digital culture, under the theme of the ADAF 2017 #PostFuture. It included installations, indoor and outdoor screenings as well as a tribute to Microwave International New Media Arts Festival (HK).

=== European Heritage Days ===
Under the theme "Seeking a new home: old and recent stories of people on the move"" the Hellenic Ministry of Culture and Sports organised, an event in the context of the European Heritage Days in 2016. During this event, ADAF pointed out the ancient and later cultural heritage through the realisation of cultural actions and modern creation by curating a series of actions including murals, installations and screenings.

== EFFE ==
Athens Digital Arts Festival is selected as one of the 26 EFFE Laureates by the EFFE International Jury. The Laureates are chosen from amongst the 715 Label recipients by EFFE – Europe for Festivals, Festivals for Europefor their exemplary work and commitment to festivals' role in the arts and societies. The EFFE Award Ceremony will take place on 18 September during the Arts Festivals Salon in Brussels, hosted by the Centre for Fine Arts, Brussels – BOZAR.

Athens Digital Arts Festival is the first Greek Laureate to represent the local cultural scene to the European Festivals Association (EFA).

== Awards ==
Over the years, ADAF has won four awards for the annual Festival. Three of those were won at the Greek "Event Awards" held by Boussias Communication in Athens every year as a tribute to the various Festivals held in Greece, with 10 categories that can be awarded . The first award ADAF won at the Greek Even Awards was the gold prize, in the category "Best in Marketing & Communication" and the SILVER for the category "Thematical Events." In 2019, ADAF got the "Silver Award" for the "Thematical Events | Cultural Organisation" as well as for the category "5 Senses Star."

Apart from the event awards, Athens Digital Arts Festival also won the gold prize for "Cultural Tourism," under the category Specialty Travel at the Tourism Awards 2018.
