= Spatial justice =

Linking social justice to geographic space

Spatial justice is a concept that links the principles of social justice to the spatial organisation of society. It examines how power, resources, rights, and opportunities are distributed across space, and how these spatial arrangements reflect, reproduce, or challenge structural inequalities. While the idea has deep roots in political philosophy and planning thought, it gained conceptual traction in the 1970s through the work of critical geographers, particularly David Harvey and Edward W. Soja.

Harvey (1973) argued that urban space is both shaped by and productive of social relations, particularly under capitalism, where processes of uneven development and spatial segregation reflect broader patterns of economic and social injustice. Soja (2010) later expanded this framework, proposing spatial justice as a distinctive analytical category, emphasising that space is not merely a backdrop for social processes but an active medium through which justice is negotiated, contested, and potentially realised.

More recently, spatial justice has been developed as a multi-dimensional framework encompassing distributive, procedural, and recognitional dimensions. The distributive dimension concerns the fair allocation of spatial resources—such as housing, transport, and green space—while the procedural dimension focuses on the inclusiveness and transparency of decision-making processes that shape space. The recognitional dimension, drawing on the work of Nancy Fraser and Iris Marion Young, addresses the visibility, dignity, and representation of marginalised identities in spatial governance.

Spatial justice is a core concern of the academic tradition known as critical geography, which interrogates the spatial manifestations of power and inequality. It also plays an increasingly prominent role in fields such as spatial planning, regional development, environmental justice, and housing policy. In practice, spatial justice frameworks are used to assess and guide policy and interventions that seek to make cities and regions more equitable, inclusive, and democratic.

== Redistributive, procedural and recognitional dimensions of spatial justice ==
Building on the work of several influential theorists of justice, notably John Rawls (1971), Nancy Fraser (1999, 2000, 2010) and Iris Marion Young (1990, 2000), contemporary understandings of spatial justice integrate three mutually-constitutive dimensions: redistributive, procedural and recognitional.

The redistributive dimension concerns the equitable spatial distribution of material benefits and burdens—such as housing, transport, green spaces, and public services—within cities and communities. It involves assessing the geography of access to essential resources that support the reproduction of social life and wellbeing. This perspective emphasises how spatial arrangements can perpetuate or mitigate socio-economic inequalities.

The procedural dimension focuses on the fairness of decision-making processes that shape spatial outcomes. This includes questions such as: who participates in planning and policy-making? Whose voices are heard or silenced? These concerns have been strongly influenced by the work of Nancy Fraser, particularly her theory of participatory parity, which argues that justice requires institutional arrangements that enable all social actors to interact as peers in decision-making processes.

By combining both dimensions, spatial justice offers a framework that addresses not only the outcomes of urban development, but also the democratic legitimacy of the processes that produce them.

Nancy Fraser has further expanded the understanding of spatial justice by incorporating a third dimension: recognitional justice. According to Fraser, participatory parity—the condition in which all individuals can interact as peers in social life—requires more than equitable distribution and fair procedures. It also demands the recognition of diverse identities, histories, and lived experiences that have been structurally devalued or rendered invisible in dominant planning and governance frameworks.

From this perspective, redistribution without recognition can reinforce cultural hierarchies by ignoring the specific ways in which injustice is experienced. Conversely, recognition without redistribution risks reducing justice to symbolic gestures or identity affirmation, without addressing the material inequalities that underlie exclusion. Therefore, Fraser argues for an integrated approach that links economic, cultural, and political dimensions of justice.

=== Distributive Dimensions of Spatial Justice ===
A first approach to spatial justice focuses on the distribution of resources, services, and environmental conditions across space. This distributive perspective evaluates justice by examining how material and immaterial goods—such as housing, employment opportunities, clean air, green space, and healthcare—are unevenly distributed across urban and regional geographies. These spatial patterns often reflect deeper social and economic inequalities, shaped by historical processes of segregation, disinvestment, and exclusion.

Distributive spatial injustices are particularly acute in contexts where marginalised groups lack the means to relocate or influence spatial decision-making, due to poverty, systemic discrimination, or political coercion. For example, under South Africa's apartheid regime, pass laws were used to enforce spatial segregation and restrict the mobility of Black populations. However, spatial injustices are not confined to authoritarian regimes. In democratic societies, structural barriers can also limit access to urban resources and public spaces.

Geographer Don Mitchell has shown how the privatisation of once-public urban land—such as parks, plazas, and sidewalks—can result in the exclusion of unhoused people and other vulnerable populations, effectively removing their right to the city.

At the urban scale, issues such as accessibility, walkability, and transport equity are increasingly recognised as matters of spatial justice. The ability to move freely, access essential services, and participate in social life depends not only on the physical layout of the city but also on the underlying social and economic structures that determine who benefits from urban development and who is excluded.

=== Procedural Dimensions of Spatial Justice ===
Another key dimension of spatial justice focuses on the decision-making processes that shape urban and regional space. This procedural approach examines how spatial decisions are made, who participates in them, and how power circulates through institutions, governance structures, and design practices. Procedural spatial justice calls for inclusive, transparent, and accountable planning processes that enable all affected communities—particularly those historically marginalised—to meaningfully participate in shaping their environments.

This perspective also raises questions about the representation of space, as well as the role of territorial and cultural identities in shaping spatial practices and claims. Analysing how minority groups experience, contest, or are excluded from spatial governance can reveal structural injustices that a universalist or technocratic approach might otherwise obscure.

Architect and urbanist Liz Ogbu has argued that spatial justice requires planners and designers to “engage people who don’t have a seat at the table and think about them as co-designers in the process.” This view aligns with urban scholar Faranak Miraftab's distinction between invited and invented spaces of participation. While the former refers to formal opportunities structured by institutions, the latter emerges from grassroots struggles to reclaim agency and voice in spatial decision-making.

=== Recognitional Dimensions of Spatial Justice ===
A third key dimension of spatial justice concerns the politics of recognition. While distributive justice focuses on the allocation of material goods and procedural justice on participatory processes, recognitional spatial justice examines how social identities, cultural practices, and group-based experiences are acknowledged—or misrecognised—within spatial planning and governance frameworks.

Philosopher Nancy Fraser has argued that full justice requires more than economic redistribution or procedural inclusion; it also demands cultural recognition, especially of those whose identities have been historically devalued or stigmatised in public institutions. In Fraser’s framework, misrecognition is not simply a psychological injury, but a form of institutionalised subordination that can impede one’s ability to participate as a peer in social life—a concept she calls participatory parity.

In the spatial domain, misrecognition manifests when the lived experiences, spatial practices, or territorial claims of minoritised groups—such as Indigenous peoples, informal settlement dwellers, or racialised communities—are rendered invisible, stereotyped, or pathologised in planning processes and urban policy. This can occur through cultural erasure, displacement, or the imposition of spatial norms that privilege dominant social groups.

Political theorist Iris Marion Young similarly argued that justice requires attending to the specificity of group-based oppression and to the ways in which spatial relations are implicated in the reproduction of domination. From this perspective, a purely universalist model of spatial planning—one that treats all subjects as formally equal without regard for historical injustice or cultural specificity—can perpetuate spatial injustice by failing to account for the differentiated needs, voices, and rights of affected groups.

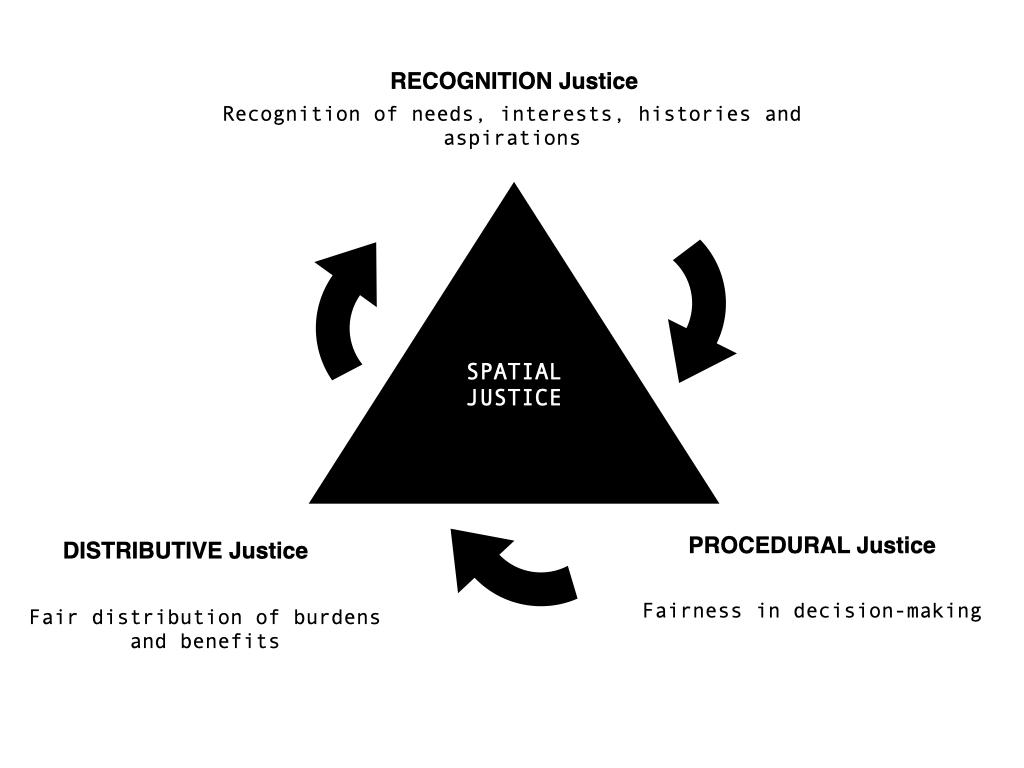
A tripartite model of spatial justice developed at the Delft University of Technology integrates three core dimensions: distributive, procedural, and recognitional justice. Influenced by the work of Nancy Fraser, Iris Marion Young, and Edward Soja, the model conceptualises spatial justice as emerging from the dynamic interaction of these dimensions. It has been applied in planning theory, participatory research, and pedagogy (Rocco, 2020, Routledge).

Recognitional spatial justice thus calls for an ethic of pluralism, historical awareness, and spatial sensitivity. This involves designing policies and spaces that acknowledge the presence and dignity of diverse groups, engage with their epistemologies and practices, and redress symbolic and material exclusions. In this view, recognition is not merely a matter of respect or inclusion, but a political act that reshapes the spatial ordering of society in more just and democratic ways.

== See also ==
- Hermann Knoflacher
- Transport Justice

== Bibliography ==
=== Key Articles and Journals ===
- Brawley, Lisa (2009). « The Practice of Spatial Justice in Crisis », Justice Spatiale - Spatial Justice, n°01, September.
- Bret, Bernard (2009). « Rawlsian Universalism Confronted with the Diversity of Reality », Justice Spatiale - Spatial Justice, n°01, September.
- Coll. (2007). "Spatial Justice", Critical Planning, Vol. 14, Summer.
- Coll. (2009). « Justice spatiale », Annales de Géographie, n°665–666, Jan–April.
- Dikeç, Mustafa (2009). « Space, Politics and (In)justice », Justice Spatiale - Spatial Justice, n°01, September.
- Fainstein, Susan S. (2009). « Spatial Justice and Planning », Justice Spatiale - Spatial Justice, n°01, September.
- Fiedler, Johannes; Humann, Melanie; & Kölke, Manuela (2012). "Radical Standard for the Implementation of Spatial Justice in Urban Planning and Design". Centre for Gender Studies, TU Braunschweig.
- Marcuse, Peter (2009). « Spatial Justice: Derivative but Causal of Social Injustice », Justice Spatiale - Spatial Justice, n°01, September.
- Soja, Edward W. (2009). « The City and Spatial Justice », Justice Spatiale - Spatial Justice, n°01, September.

=== Foundational and Theoretical Works ===
- Fraser, N. (1990). Rethinking the Public Sphere: A Contribution to the Critique of Actually Existing Democracy. Social Text 25-26(1): 56-80.
- Fraser, Nancy (2000). Rethinking Recognition. In Osborne, Peter (Ed.), Recognition and Power: Axel Honneth and the Tradition of Critical Social Theory, Routledge, pp. 107–120.
- Fraser, Nancy (2003). Social Justice in the Age of Identity Politics: Redistribution, Recognition, and Participation. In Fraser, N. & Honneth, A. (Eds.), Redistribution or Recognition? London: Verso.
- Fraser, N. (2010). Scales of Justice: Reimagining Political Space in a Globalizing World, Columbia University Press.
- Harvey, David (1973). Social Justice and the City. London: Edward Arnold.
- Harvey, David (1992). "Social Justice, Postmodernism and the City". International Journal of Urban and Regional Research, 16(4), pp. 588–601.
- Lefebvre, Henri (1968). Le Droit à la ville. Paris: Anthropos.
- Lefebvre, Henri (1972). Espace et politique. Paris: Anthropos.
- Miraftab, Faranak (2009). "Insurgent Planning: Situating Radical Planning in the Global South". Planning Theory, 8(1), pp. 32–50. https://doi.org/10.1177/1473095208099297
- Mitchell, Don (2003). The Right to the City: Social Justice and the Fight for Public Space. New York: Guilford Press.
- Pirie, Gordon (1983). "On Spatial Justice". Environment and Planning A, 15, pp. 465–473.
- Rawls, John (1971). A Theory of Justice. Cambridge: Harvard University Press.
- Reynaud, Alain (1981). Société, espace et justice. Paris: PUF.
- Rocco, Roberto (2026). Spatial Justice: The Basics. London: Routledge.
- Smith, D. M. (1994). Geography and Social Justice. Oxford: Blackwell.
- Soja, Edward W. (2000). Postmetropolis: Critical Studies of Cities and Regions. Oxford: Blackwell.
- Soja, Edward W. (2010). Seeking Spatial Justice. Minneapolis: University of Minnesota Press.
- Young, Iris Marion (1990). Justice and the Politics of Difference. Princeton: Princeton University Press.
- Young, Iris Marion (2000). Inclusion and Democracy. Oxford: Oxford University Press.
- Ogbu, Liz (2018). "Social Impact Design as a New Practice". In Bell, Susan & Wakeford, Ralph (Eds.), Listening to the City, Routledge, pp. 65–78.
