= Greek National Council for Radio and Television =

Greek broadcasting regulator

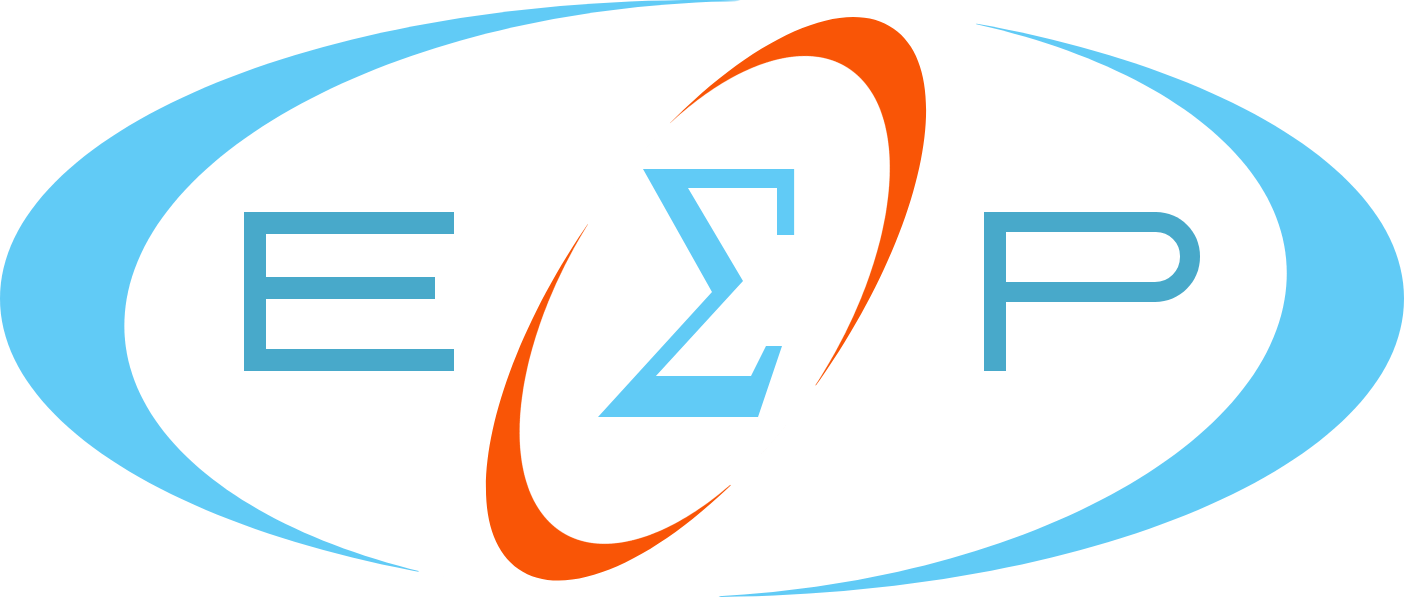
- Formation: 1989

The Greek National Council for Radio and Television (NCRTV) (Greek: Εθνικό Συμβούλιο Ραδιοτηλεόρασης, Ethnikó Simvúlio Radhiotileórasis, ESR) is an independent supervisory and regulatory administrative authority of the radio and television market. It was founded in 1989.

It consists of seven members – a President, a Vice President and five members, which are all appointed by the Greek Parliament.

The NCRTV is the main regulator for private and public broadcast media, established by the Law 1866/1989 as an independent authority whose action is only subordinated to the courts. It grants licenses to private radios and TV, and ensures the respect of the law by license-holders. It can impose penalties, up to suspending or cancelling licenses.

== Homophobia claims ==
The NCRTV has repeatedly been accused of homophobia.
