= Technopolis (Gazi) =

Coordinates: 37°58′41.3″N 23°42′50.8″E

Technopolis of Athens
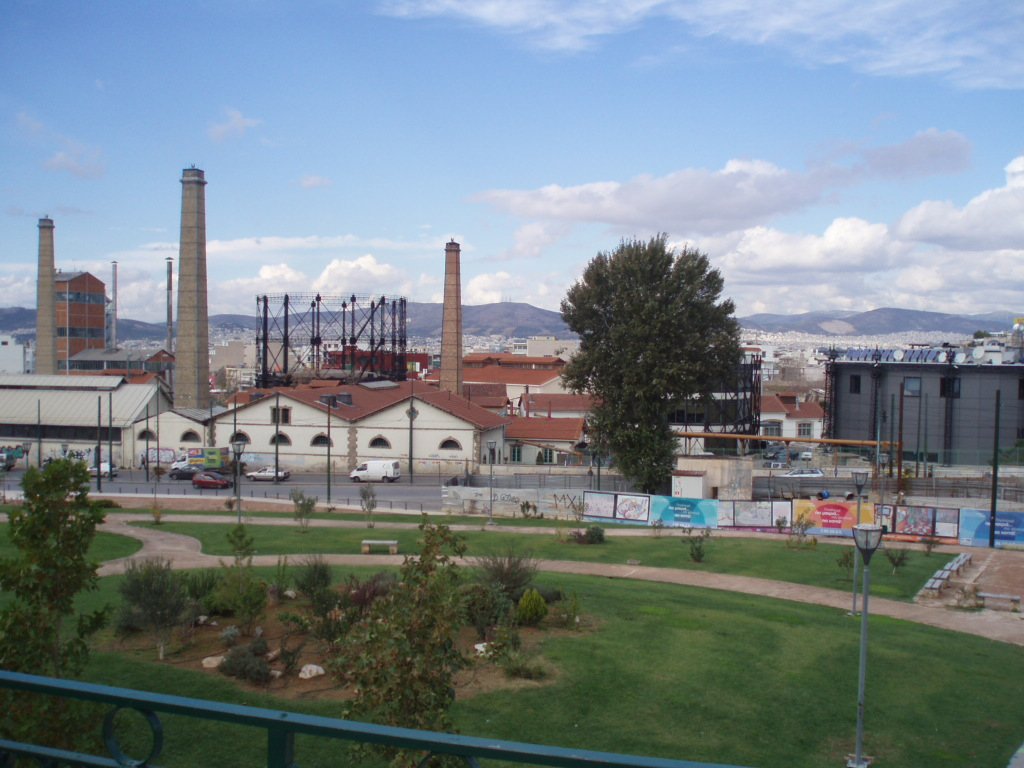
- Established: 1999
- Location: Athens, Greece
- Type: Industrial museum & cultural venue
- Public transit access: Kerameikos station Thiseio station

Technopolis (Gazi) is an industrial museum and a major cultural venue of the City of Athens, Greece, in the neighborhood of Gazi, next to Keramikos and very close to the Acropolis. It is dedicated to the memory of the great Greek composer Manos Hatzidakis, which is why it is also known as "Gazi Technopolis Manos Hatzidakis". It has been in operation since 1999 and is situated in the city's former gasworks which were founded in 1857, occupying an area of about 30.000 m2. Numerous exhibitions, seminars, music concerts and other cultural activities take place in the grounds. Eight of the buildings of the compound bear the names of famous Greek poets: Andreas Embirikos, Angelos Sikelianos, Yannis Ritsos, Kostis Palamas, Takis Papatsonis, Constantine Cavafis and Kostas Varnalis. On the second floor of the Angelos Sikelianos building is a museum dedicated to the renowned opera singer Maria Callas.

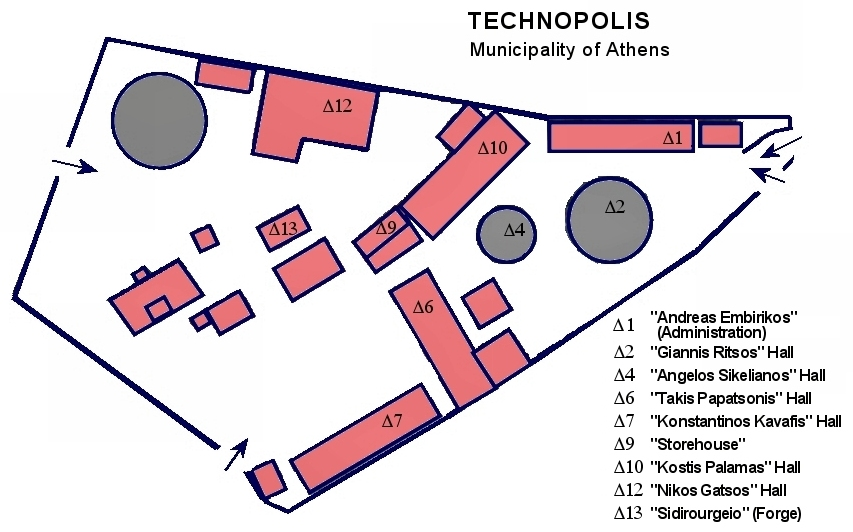
